= Jon Marshall =

British industrial designer (born 1970)

Jon Marshall (born 1970) is a British industrial designer based in London. He is a partner at design studio Pentagram.

== Biography ==
Marshall studied product design at Ravensbourne College of Design and Communication and industrial design at the Royal College of Art. He began his professional career working for Ross Lovegrove before moving to Pentagram, where he worked for Daniel Weil. In 2003 he joined Barber Osgerby as Studio Director and worked on some of the studio's furniture and product designs, including the 2012 London Olympic Torch.

In 2012 he co-founded the industrial design consultancy Map Project Office, which he led until 2018 when he became a partner at Pentagram.

During his career Marshall has won design awards and was listed as one of Creative Review’s top 50 creative leaders.

== Career ==
=== Map Project Office ===
Between 2012 and 2018, Marshall led the industrial design consultancy Map Project Office where he created products and user experiences for global brands like Virgin Atlantic and Honda as well as start-ups like BleepBleeps and Sam Labs. The studio's work for Sam Labs won best in show at the Design Week 2015 Awards.

One of Map's first projects was to create a DIY computer kit for Kano. The kit originally launched on Kickstarter and at the time was the highest funded educational project on the platform. The design received multiple awards including a Red Dot award and a Golden Lion at the Cannes Lions International Festival of Creativity, one of only two Cannes Lions awards for UK design agencies in 2014.

Under Marshall's leadership, Map was named Creative Review's 2016 Agency of the Year and listed in 2016 by Fast Company as one of the most innovative companies in design.

=== Pentagram ===
In 2018 Marshall became a partner in Pentagram’s London office. His work at Pentagram fuses product design with environments, packaging and digital experiences, often working with emerging technologies like artificial intelligence and cryptocurrency. Notable projects include the design of an immersive exhibition for Uniqlo LifeWear Day, generative hardware design for semiconductor company Graphcore and letterbox-friendly packaging for brain health brand Heights.

His design for Yoto Player, an interactive speaker for children, was listed as one of Time Magazine's best inventions of 2020 and awarded best consumer product by Design Week. In 2024, the 3rd generation Yoto Player design won an International Design Excellence Awards gold, Red Dot Award, D&AD Graphite Pencil and a Good Design Award.

In 2021 he was commissioned by UEFA to design the trophy for its new European club football competition, the Europa Conference League. His design features 32 hexagonal spines, which represent the 32 teams in the original group stage, curving upwards in a manner intended to resemble a football curling through the air towards the goal.

In 2023 he worked with Pentagram partner Harry Pearce on the 50th anniversary box set to commemorate Pink Floyd's album The Dark Side of the Moon.

In 2023 Marshall designed a DIY Flashlight to teach children STEM skills for Ambessa Play, which won Product Design of the Year at the 2024 Dezeen Awards. Filmmaker Andrés Fraga filmed Marshall and his team visiting the factories that manufacture the DIY Flashlight for a documentary called Three Days in China.
