= Willer (surname) =

Willer is a surname. Notable people with the surname include:

- Anne Walsh Willer (1923–2017), American politician
- Emil Willer (born 1932), German boxer
- Luise Willer (1888–1970), German operatic contralto
- Marina Willer, Brazilian graphic designer and filmmaker
- Robb Willer (born 1977), American sociologist and social psychologist
- Shirley Willer (1922–1999), American feminist and activist

== See also ==
- Willer (given name)
- Willer (disambiguation)
