= Kim Na =

South Korean artist (born 1986)

- Born: 1986; Seoul, South Korea
- Occupation: Artist
- Years active: 2015–present

Kim Na (Korean: 김나; born 1986) is a South Korean-born United States illustrator, graphic designer, and former child actor. Based in Brooklyn, New York, she is the art director of The Paris Review.

== Early life and education ==
Through high school, Kim moved between South Korea and New Jersey. She obtained a degree in illustration at the Maryland Institute College of Art, with a minor in art history.

== Career ==
After college, she did freelance illustration work for The New York Times and worked as a bartender. Later, she interned at Bloomsbury Publishing.

In 2015, she joined Farrar, Straus and Giroux as a senior book designer. For the nine years of her tenure at FSG, her work was included on The New York Times’ annual list of best book covers. She created covers for Sheila Heti, Raven Leilani, Jeffrey Eugenides, Mike Roberts and more.

In 2021, Kim became the art director of The Paris Review. With designer Matt Willey, Kim redesigned the magazine’s visual identity.

In 2023, Kim had her debut painting exhibition at White Columns.
