= David Hillman (designer) =

British graphic designer (born 1943)

David Hillman RDI
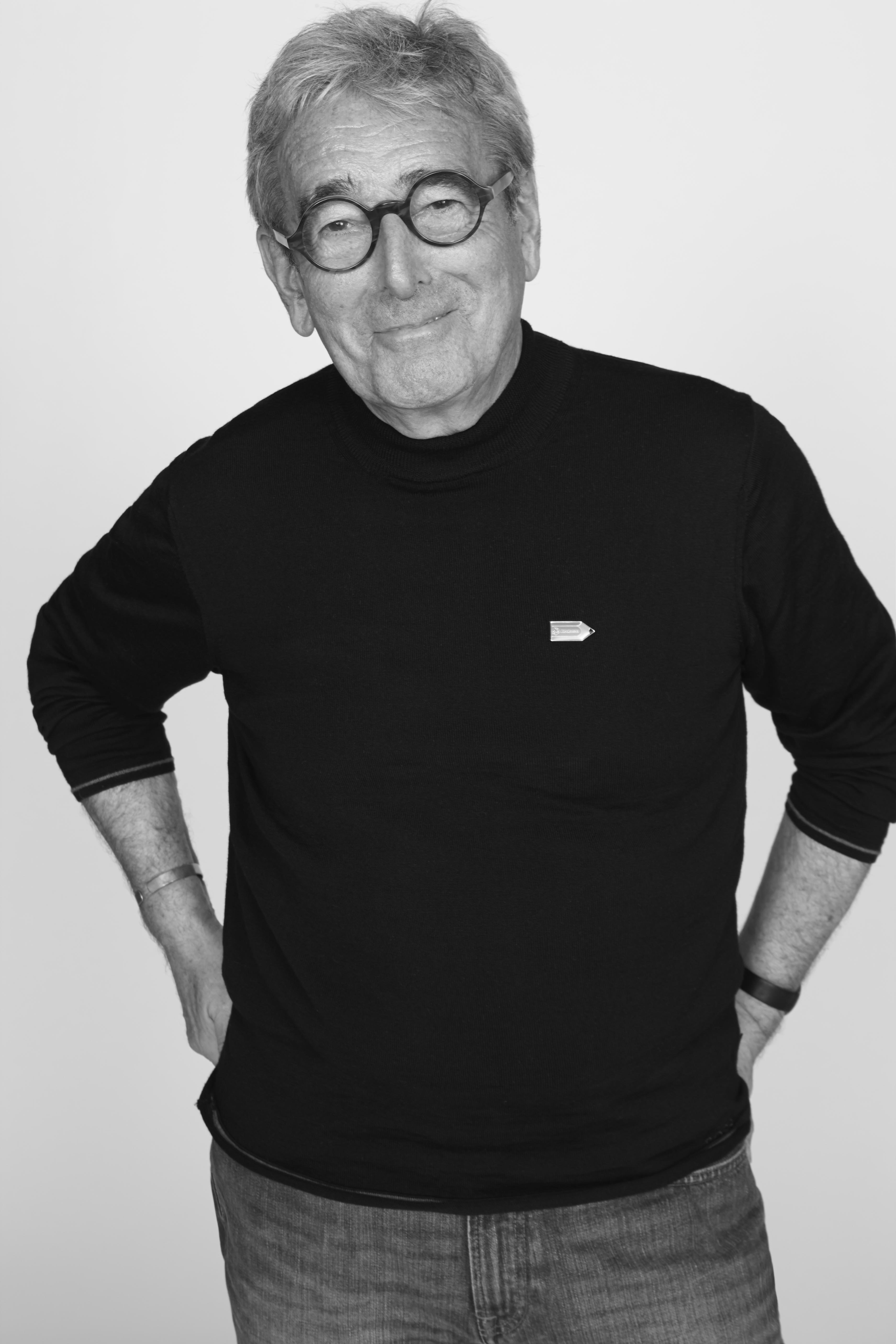
- Born: 12 February 1943 (age 83); Oxford, England
- Citizenship: British
- Education: London School of Printing and Graphic Arts
- Occupation: Graphic designer
- Known for: Guardian Newspaper 1988 re-design; Nova magazine; Phaidon identity; Tate identity
- Spouse: Jennie Hillman (m. 1983)

David Hillman RDI (born 12 February 1943) is a British graphic designer. He was a partner at design firm Pentagram between 1978 and 2006.

== Early life ==
Hillman was born 12 February 1943 in Oxford, England. His father worked at Pathé News and supplied newsreels to cinemas. Hillman attended Aristotle Central School in London. He later moved to The London School of Printing and Graphic Arts and studied from 1959 to 1962 under Tom Eckersley.

== Career ==
David Hillman began his career in graphic design at the age of 19, shortly after completing his education at the LSP. His first professional role was with the newly established The Sunday Times Magazine under editor Mark Boxer. Alongside the daily work at the magazine, Mark and David also worked together with David Bailey to produce David Bailey's box of pin-ups. In 1965 he left to join the editorial team at London Life as art editor. He later returned to The Sunday Times, where he contributed to the design direction of both the newspaper as well as its magazine supplement.

Hillman moved onto Nova magazine in 1968, overseeing art direction while also serving as deputy editor. Following the closure of Nova in 1975, he launched an independent studio, where one of his notable commissions was an overhaul of the French daily Le Matin de Paris, the first computerised daily newspaper.

During this period Hillman was elected to the Alliance Graphique Internationale (1977). An organisation of which he would later take on two leadership roles – serving as its UK President from 1996 to 2000 and as International President between 2000 and 2003.

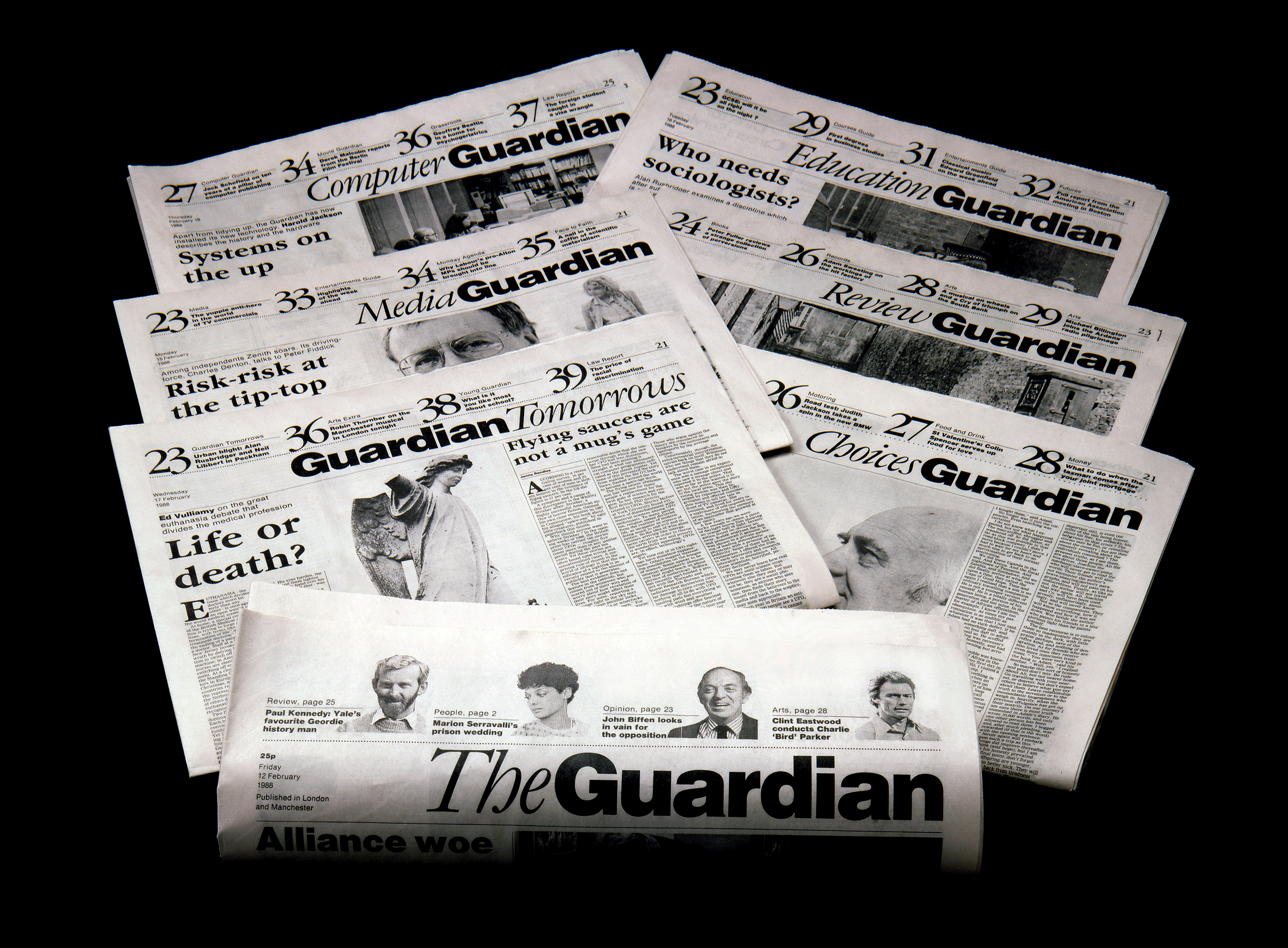
Covers of The Guardian following Hillman's 1988 redesign. The masthead appears in Helvetica Bold, with supporting typography in Garamond Italic.

Hillman became a partner at Pentagram Design in 1978 and remained with the firm until 2006. As a Pentagram partner – along jobs including the Phaidon identity, Tate Identity and Il Sole 24 Ore redesign – he undertook "one of the most influential redesigns of a national newspaper in the modern era" – The Guardian.

During his time at Pentagram Design, Hillman also authored several books on visual puzzles, starting with Puzzlegrams in 1989.

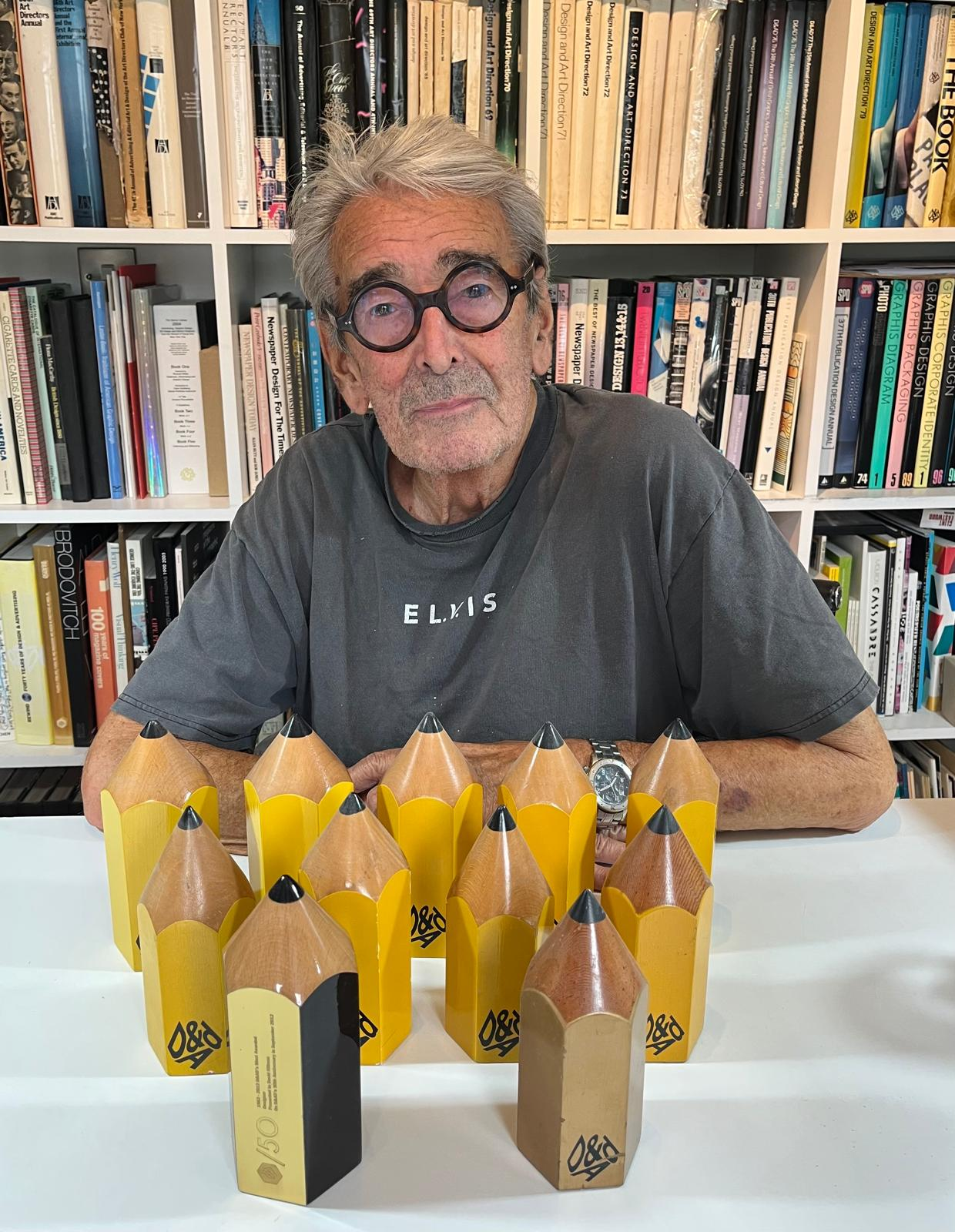
David Hillman photographed with several of his D&AD awards, 2025.

Hillman established his own studio, Studio David Hillman, after leaving the design consultancy. Over the course of his career, he has received several honours: in 1997, he was appointed a Royal Designer for Industry, and in 2004, he was named a Senior Fellow of the Royal College of Art. In 2012, he was recognised by D&AD as its Most Awarded Designer.

== Work ==
=== Editorial designs ===
==== Newspapers ====
- The Guardian
- Il Sole 24 Ore
- De Volkskrant 1993
- Le Matin de Paris
- Sunday Express Colour Magazine

==== Magazines ====
- Nova (magazine)
- IRM
- Building
- Design (Design Council) 1990
- Big Paper (Design Council)
- People (magazine)
- Times Higher Education
- Classic FM Magazine
- New Statesman
- National Trust
- Nursing Times
- Business
- City Limits (London magazine) 1989

==== Books ====
- David Bailey Box of Pin-Ups
- Terence Donovan The Photographs
- Terence Donovan Fashion
- Terence Donovan Portraits
- Terence Donovan 100 Fashion Photos
- Terence Donovan 100 Faces
- Nova 1965–1975
- The English Sunrise
- Century Makers
- Puzzlegrams
- Puzzlegrams Too!
- Pentagames
- Phantasmagrams
- Pentamagic
- Yes Logo
- A Visual Feast
- Tables, Boxes, Screens, Cabinets... - Adrian Quan
- Wonders of the Stereoscope
- Paris en 3D
- Pentagram Compendium
- Taking His Time
- The State Hermitage
- The Splendour of Iran
- Essays on Design
- The Health and Beauty Book
- The Sixties
- Play the Game
- Hand & Machine
- The Salvation Army
- D&AD Annual 1974 with John McConnell
- Stanley Spencer, The Complete Catalogue of Painting
- European Photography 81
- European Photography Eighty Two, Eighty Three

=== Brand identity designs ===
- Royal College of Nursing
- Ideal Standard
- Editorial Intelligence
- Bocconi, Milan
- IDI
- World Advertising Research Centre (WARC)
- Sekonda
- The Wing, Hong Kong
- Liverpool Biennial, 2006
- Skandia

==== Marks and logotypes ====
- Arup
- Building
- Marja Kurki
- Dragonfly Tea
- Dragonfly Cloud Tea
- Wave
- Obongo
- Mark Borkowski
- Ez'ech
- Trevi
- World Advertising Research Centre (WARC)
- Sekonda
- Spaghetti Records
- Cedric Lisney Associates
- Royal College of Nursing
- Golden Grove
- Scottish Trade Centre
- Stratos
- Viscom
- The Guardian
- Sunday Times Magazine
- Phaidon

=== Packaging ===
- Ideal-Standard
- Dragonfly Tea
- Tick Tock

=== Calendars ===
- Ideal-Standard
- Wakefield Fortune

=== Signage ===
- Canary Wharf, London
- Stockley Park, Middlesex
- National Maritime Museum, London
- Bull Ring, Birmingham
- Chiswick Park, London
- Tate Modern
- Tate Milbank
- Tate Liverpool
- Tate St. Ives
- Liverpool Biennial 2006
- Angel Building, London
- Selfridges, Manchester

=== Exhibition designs ===
- The Colorado International Invitation Poster Exhibition 1983

==== Exhibition graphics ====
- Modernism, V&A
- Liverpool Biennial 2006

==== One man shows ====
- Hillman in Print. The Hub, Sleaford, 2009

=== Posters ===
- The Turner Prize 1991, The Tate Gallery
- One Classic Ground 1990, The Tate Gallery
- Modernism V&A
- Kenneth Grange V&A
- Design Magazine
- IDI
- Liverpool Biennial
- Fondazione Napoli Novantanove

=== Stamps ===
- The Royal Diamond Jubilee Wedding
- Freedom Stamp
- Millennium 2000 (48)

=== Retail ===
- Wakefield Fortune Travel

== Honours ==
- 1972 D&AD Silver Editorial Design
- 1972 D&AD Silver Art direction
- 1973 D&AD Gold Most outstanding piece of Design
- 1973 D&AD Silver Book Design
- 1973 D&AD Silver Editorial Design
- 1975 D&AD Silver Editorial Design
- 1983 D&AD Silver Retail Design
- 1984 D&AD Silver Editorial Design
- 1988 D&AD Silver Newspaper Design
- 1993 D&AD Silver Poster Design
- 2000 D&AD Silver Stamp Design
- 1997 Royal Designer to Industry
- 2004 Senior Fellow Royal College of Art
- 1989 New York Art Directs club Silver Book design
- 2012 D&AD Most Awarded designer
- The Art Director's 6th International Exhibition Silver Award for Book Design, USA
- 1989 Society of Newspaper Designers – The Guardian Re-design Silver Award, USA
- 1999 Sign Design Awards Grandprix for the Most Outstanding Entry

== Gallery ==
Selected works designed by David Hillman
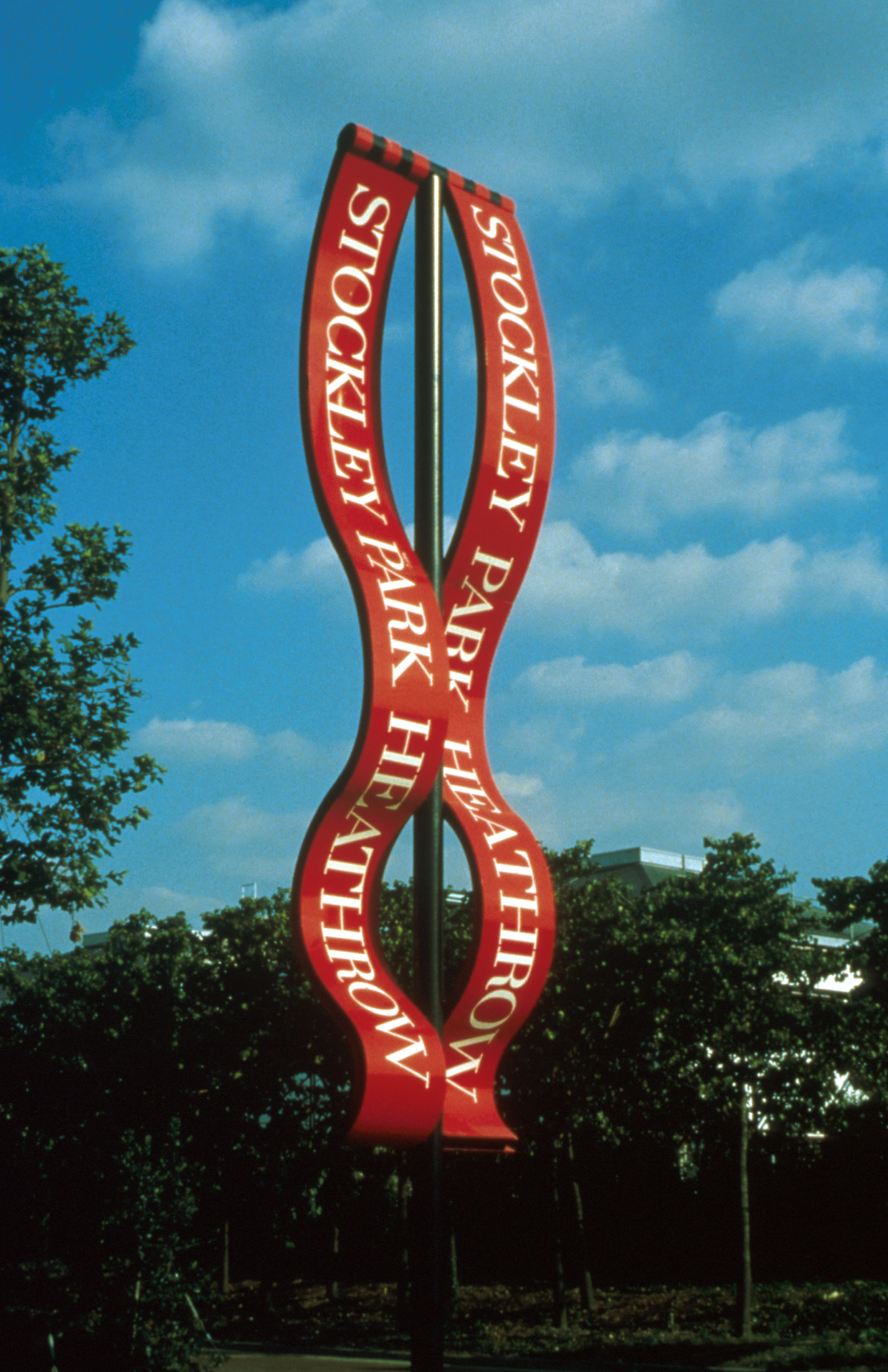
Signage for Stockley Park Heathrow

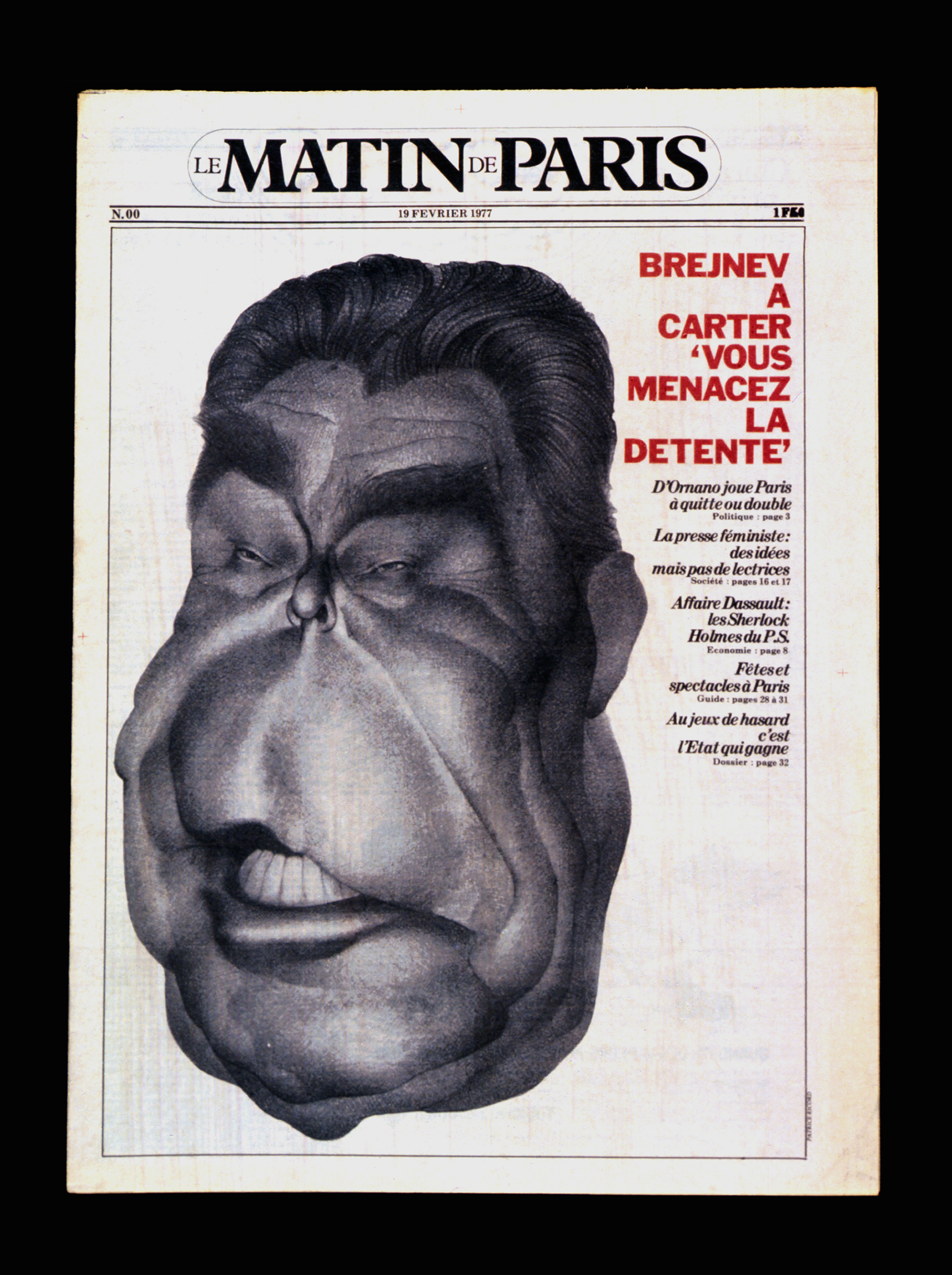
Issue of Le Matin de Paris

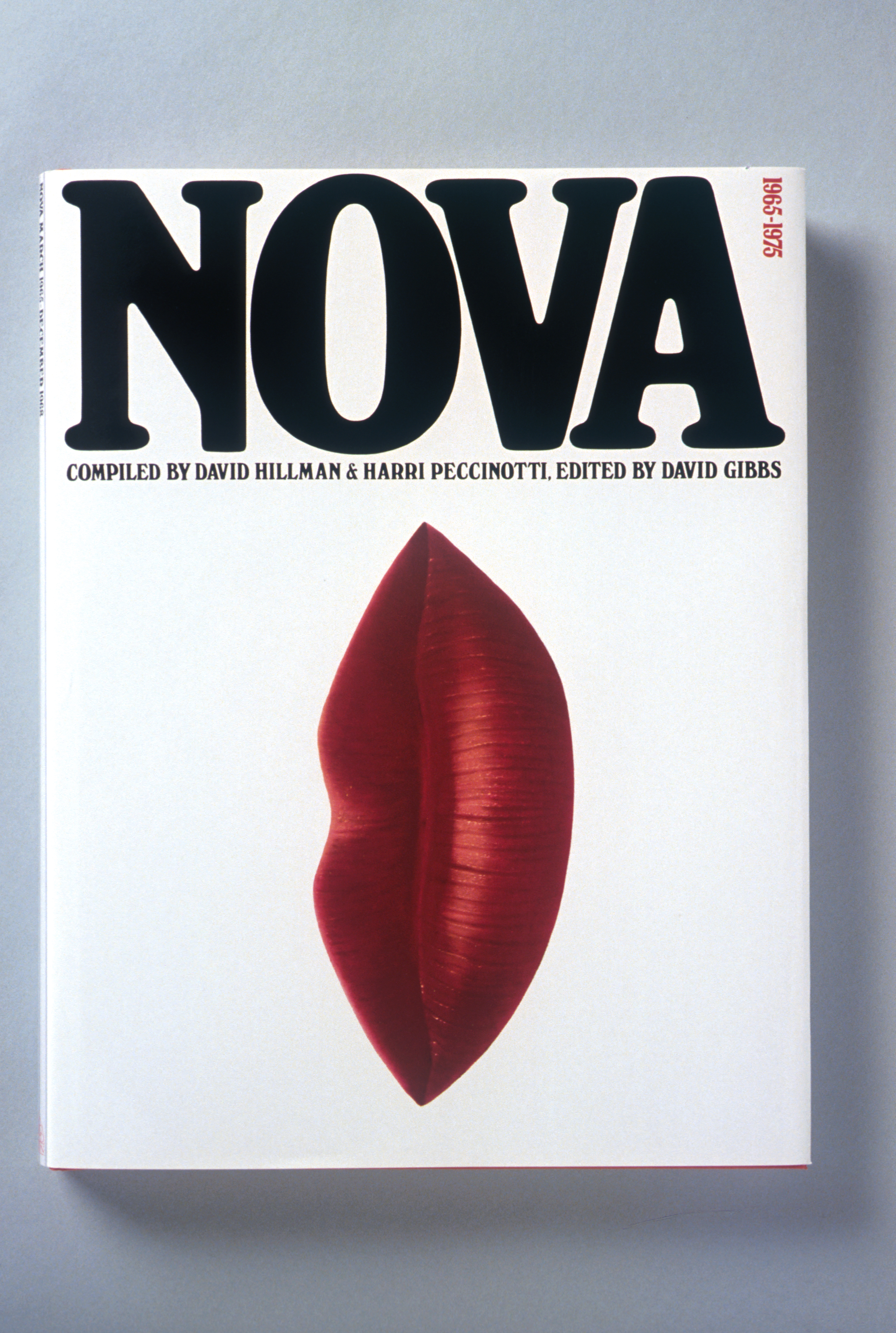
Nova 1965–1975 by David Hillman and Harry Peccinotti

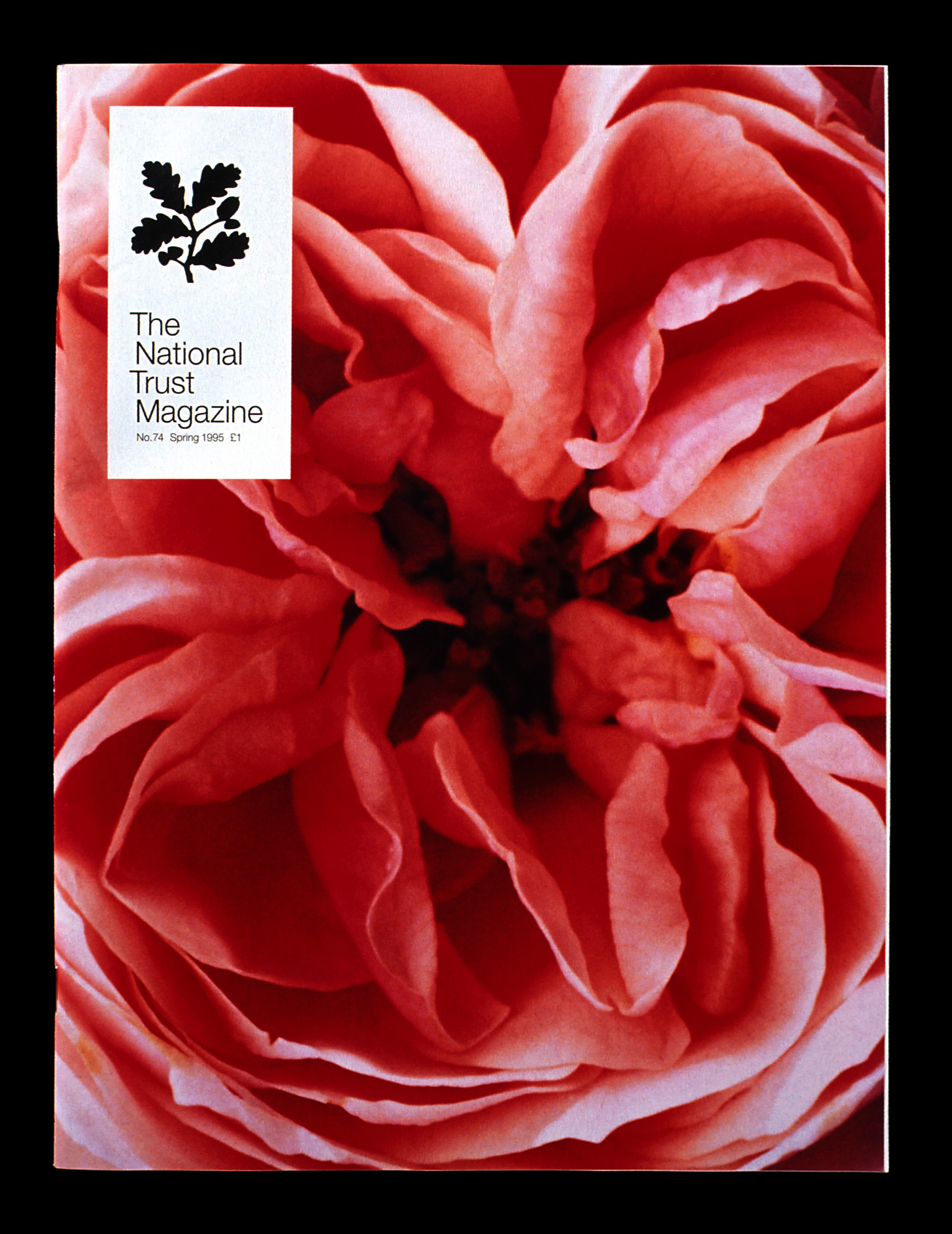
Front cover of issue of National Trust

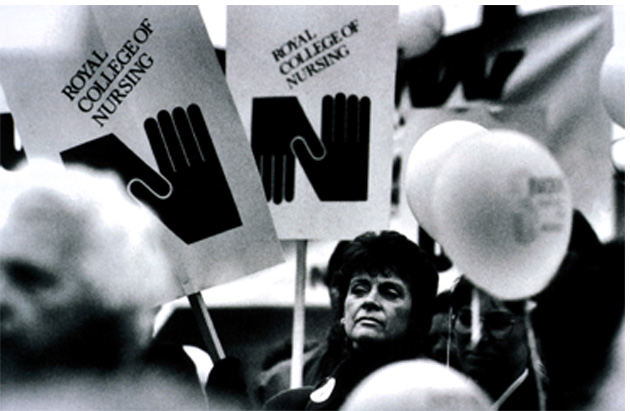
Assembly of nurses, carrying placards with the Royal College of Nursing identity, designed by David Hillman

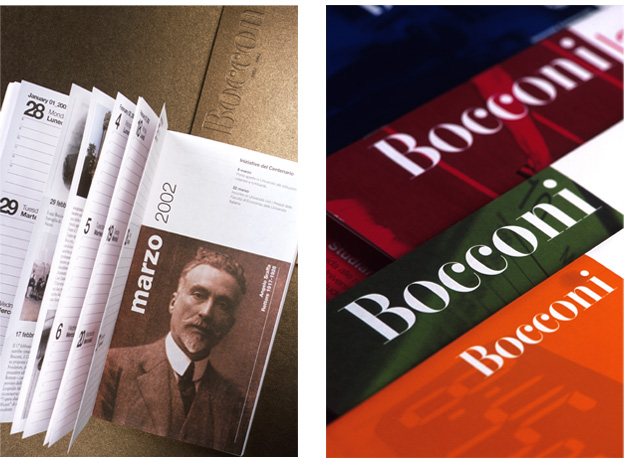
Bocconi books and calendar

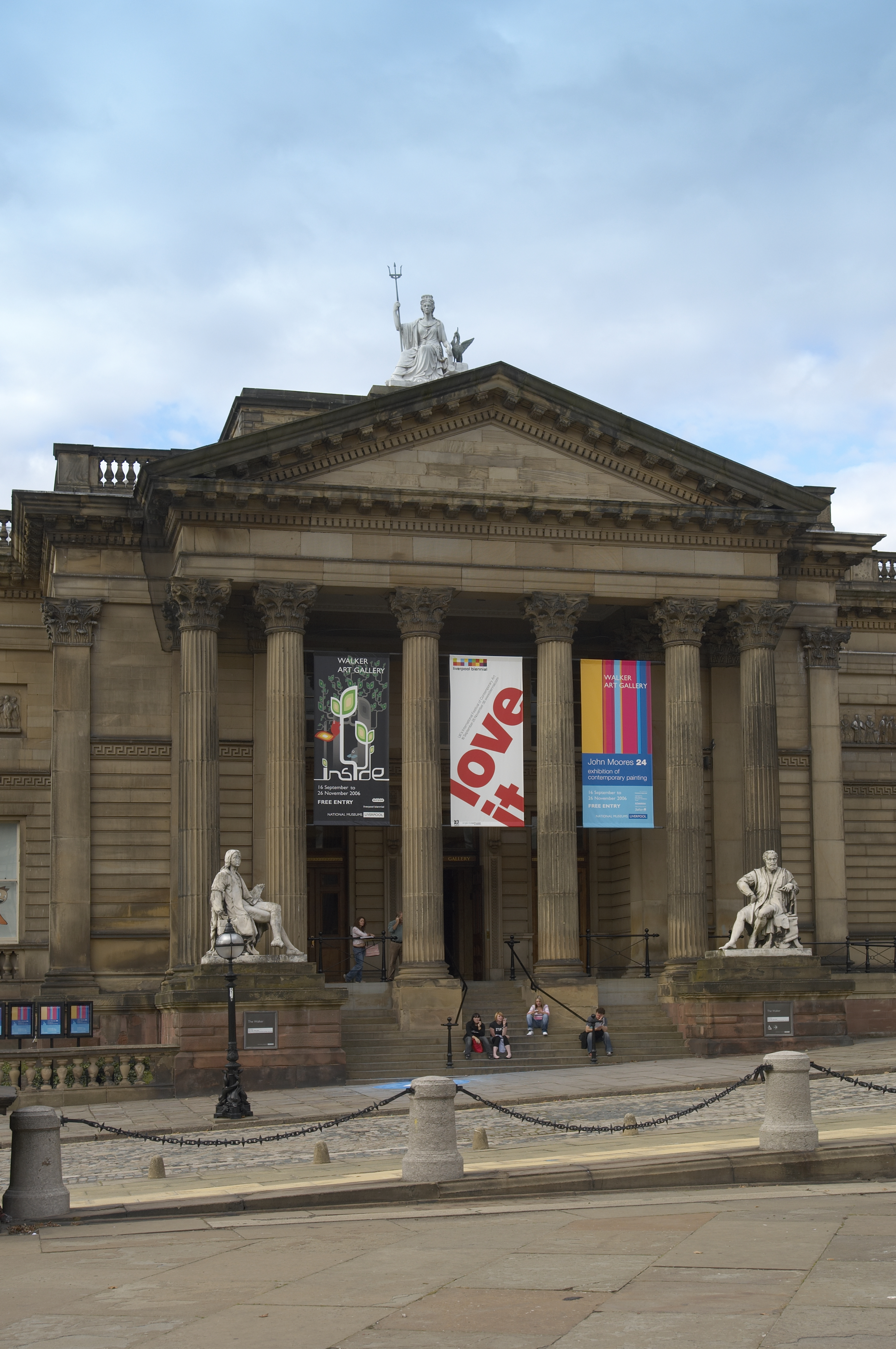
Liverpool Bienniel posters
