= Lorenzo Apicella =

Italian architect

Lorenzo Apicella is an Italian architect.

Born in Ravello, Apicella studied architecture at the University of Nottingham, Canterbury College of Art and the Royal College of Art in London. On graduating top of his year in 1981 he joined Skidmore, Owings & Merrill as assistant designer for the 70-storey Allied Bank Plaza Building in Houston, Texas (now Wells Fargo Plaza). He subsequently worked with Piers Gough at CZWG architects on alternatives to Ludwig Mies van der Rohe's Mansion House Square, London, and on international architecture, design and exhibition projects for communications agency Imagination.

In 1989 he established Apicella Associates, his own practice in London. In 1998, after completing projects ranging from buildings and interiors, to exhibitions, events environments, and mobile structures, he merged his studio with Pentagram, becoming a partner/owner in the London office and subsequently in Pentagram San Francisco. In 2017 he founded Apicella Studio in San Francisco, an architecture and design consultancy specializing in the design of buildings, interiors, exhibitions, event environments, and brand installations.

His published projects include the Research and Design Centre for Adshel; ongoing projects worldwide for Citibank; a comprehensive interior design programme for Virgin Atlantic Upper, Premium and Economy Class cabins for the entire Virgin fleet (including award-winning redesign of Virgin’s Upper Class aircraft cabins); a country-wide branch interiors program for Rabobank, Holland’s second largest high street bank; three buildings in London for Clear Channel International; 'World Architecture Award' winning showrooms on 5th Avenue New York for shoe store Jimlar; Exhibitor Magazine’s ‘Best of 30 Years’ award-winning exhibition environment in Denver for architectural audio company Sonance; eight new buildings for M&T Bank, including a new regional flagship branch in Buffalo, New York, the AIA award-winning central branch building in Brooklyn, New York and Entrance Pavilion at M&T Bank’s Landmark Headquarters in Buffalo; and the ‘Mad Men’ monument for AMC Television in Time Life Plaza, New York.

Apicella has chaired Royal Institute of British Architects awards, UK Civic Trust awards and design competitions juries, including the AIA awards for Southern California in San Diego, the World Architecture Festival Awards, and the Inside Festival Awards in Barcelona. He has acted as an External Examiner for the Department of Architecture, Oxford Brookes University and the School of Design at UCE Birmingham, and a Course Validator at the Royal College of Art in the UK.

== Affiliations ==
Apicella is a member of both the Royal Institute of British Architects and the American Institute of Architects and is a fellow of the Royal Society of Arts.
