= Woody Pirtle =

American graphic designer (1944–2025)

- Born: Woodrow Tyler Pirtle, Jr. 1944; Corsicana, Texas
- Died: January 7, 2025 (aged 80–81); Hudson, New York
- Occupation: Graphic designer

Woody Pirtle (1944–2025) was an American artist, graphic designer, founder and head of Pirtle Design and a former partner at design firm Pentagram. He was commissioned by Amnesty International to design a series of posters focusing on 12 of the individual articles of the Universal Declaration of Human Rights.

== Biography ==
Pirtle established Pirtle Design in Dallas, Texas in 1978. Between 1978 and 1988, the firm created identity programs and marketing materials for Baylor University Medical Center, Dallas Museum of Art, T.G.I. Friday's, Dallas Opera, Diamond Shamrock, National Gypsum, Centex (now PulteGroup), Hines Interests Limited Partnership, Simpson Paper Company and NCR Corporation.

In 1988, Woody Pirtle merged Pirtle Design with Pentagram, an international design consultancy founded in London in 1972, becoming a partner at their New York offices for the next 18 years while continuing to work with some of the firm's most prestigious clients. Between 1988 and 2005, Pirtle and the office of Pentagram produced work for Brown-Forman, Bacardi Global Brands, Flying Fish Brewing Company, Watch City Brewing Company, Murray’s Cheese, Really Cool Foods, IBM, Champion International Corporation, Fine Line Features, The Rockefeller Foundation, Nine West, Northern Telecom, Knoll International, Wellesley College, Princeton University, Brooklyn Law School, and Amnesty International. In 2005, Pirtle left Pentagram to re-establish Pirtle Design.

According to Pirtle's website, "Woody’s work has been exhibited worldwide and is in the permanent collections of the Museum of Modern Art and Cooper-Hewitt Museum in New York City, the Victoria & Albert Museum in London, the Neue Sammlung Museum in Munich, and the Zurich Poster Museum. He taught at the School of Visual Arts, lectured extensively, was a member of the Alliance Graphique Internationale, and served on the board of HOW magazine, Sustainable Hudson Valley, and the American Institute of Graphic Arts ("AIGA").

In October 2003, he was awarded the prestigious AIGA Medal for his career contribution to the design profession. In 2015, Pirtle was awarded the Rome Prize in Design from the American Academy in Rome where he lived and worked until early March 2016.

Pirtle died in January 2025, at the age of 81.
