= Sam Labs =

SAM Labs
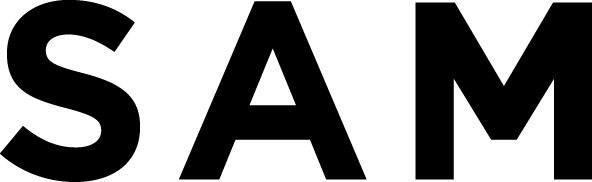

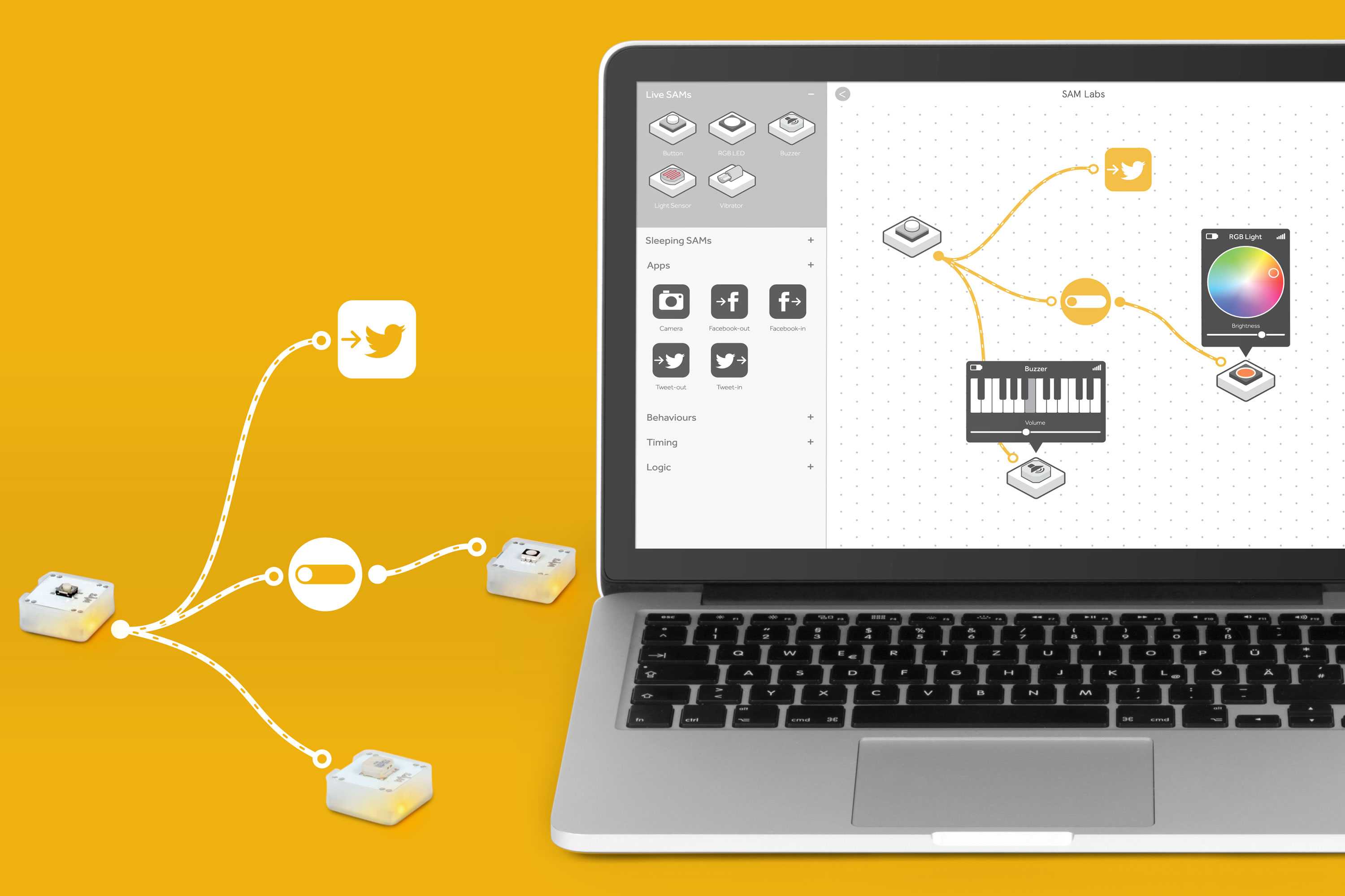
- Founded: April 2014
- Founder: Joachim Horn
- Headquarters: East London, United Kingdom
- Products: Educational Robots, Prototyping Kits, Apps, Games, STEM & STEAM Toys
- Website: samlabs.com

SAM Labs is a startup that makes app-enabled construction kits, designed for people of all ages to learn STEM, play, and create with technology and the Internet of Things. The company has been featured in WIRED and The Telegraph. Founded by Belgian born CEO Joachim Horn, the company works out of their headquarters in East London.

A month-long Kickstarter campaign initiated in October 2014 raised over $160,000, and helped launch the mass production of the kits. Backers included Jawbone co-founder Alexander Asseily, who pre-ordered the kit.

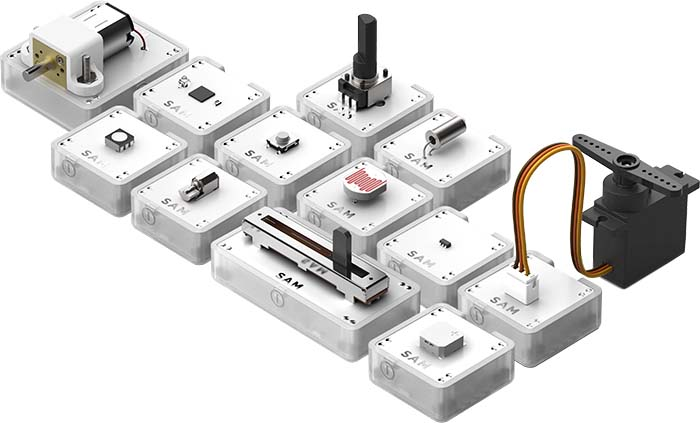
Hardware blocks from the SAMily.

== Kickstarter campaign ==
On 29 September 2014, SAM Labs launched a month-long Kickstarter campaign to crowdfund the mass manufacture of the SAM kits for the spring of 2015, primarily through pre-orders of the kits. At the conclusion of the campaign on 29 October, SAM Labs had raised over $160,000 from 817 backers.

== Products ==
SAM Labs produces app-enabled construction toys, with sales both to both schools and other customers.

The SAM Science Museum Inventor Kit was produced in collaboration with the London Science Museum. Using the SAM Blocks and the free SAM Space app inside of the kit, kids can build projects, games, inventions and hacks.

The company's hero kit, SAM's Curious Cars, launched in October 2016. Available now at Barnes & Noble across the United States and John Lewis (department store) in the United Kingdom, the Curious Cars kit allows kids to build and program their own cars and games. Winning an IFA Markit Innovation Award, Consumer Electronics Show Award, and a KAPi award, the triple-award-winning kit also comes with its own app: Curious Cars.

In 2024, SAM Labs acquired the Root educational robot product line from IRobot. The product line was then partially rebranded, with the mobile app being named SAM Root.

== Partnerships ==
SAM Labs has created a habit of working with local design talent. SAM Labs first partnered with MAP Project Office, the London-based creative consultancy that specialises in industrial design, to deliver the Kickstarter campaign. Map also featured SAM Labs in a video collaboration with Honda, where SAM led modules were featured in this promotional video, covering "Technology for Exploration." The second design partnership was with Pentagram Design Studio, to collaborate around the SAM Labs branding "that never stands still". Most recently, SAM collaborated with Hato Press and the London Science Museum to create the SAM Labs Science Museum "Inventor Kit".

== Awards ==
The SAM Labs kits have received two Design Week Awards: the Best of Show Award and the Interactive Design Award, the judges said: “A really cohesive design; from the elegant packaging, to the use of the product itself. An amazing use of code and education. This really steps above and beyond expected design and opens up hundreds of possibilities.” Additionally, the SAM Labs kit have received four Maker Faire awards by MAKE magazine: three "Editor's Choice Awards" and one "Best in Class Award". SAM Labs was a winner at the November 2014 Pitch@Palace UK Royal competition, which saw SAM being presented at the World Economic Forum in January 2015. In partnership with the Map Project Office, SAM Labs was awarded "Best Interactive Design" in the Design Week Awards 2015. SAM Labs also became a member of the Disrupt 100 most innovative companies for educational toys. Winner of a gold medal for the best Educational Gaming Toy in the 2016 Independent Toy Awards, SAM Labs swept up four more awards throughout Q4: a silver place for the UK Business awards for Disruptive Business model, an IFA Markit Innovation Award for Apps, Platforms & Ecosystems, Best Educational Toy in the Toy Testers awards, and a CES Innovation award in the Tech For a Better World category. After winning the Alphr + ITPro award for Best Startup of 2016, the company has landed a finalist position in the GESS Education Awards for 2017.
