= Alan Fletcher (graphic designer) =

British graphic designer (1931–2006)

Alan Fletcher RDI
- Born: 27 September 1931; Nairobi, Kenya
- Died: 21 September 2006 (aged 74); East Sussex, England
- Occupation: Graphic designer

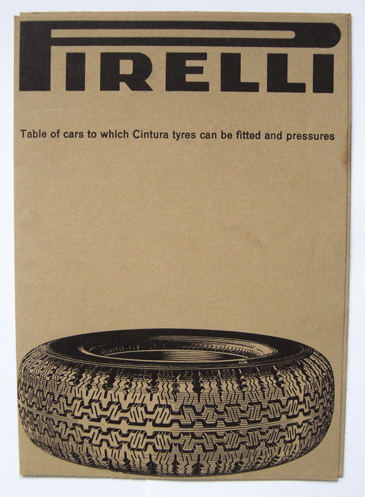
Pirelli brochure designed by Fletcher/Forbes/Gill

Alan Gerard Fletcher (27 September 1931 – 21 September 2006) was a British graphic designer and one of the founders of the design studio Pentagram. In his obituary, he was described by The Daily Telegraph as "the most highly regarded graphic designer of his generation, and probably one of the most prolific". Fletcher was noted for use of bold colors and a humorous graphic approach to advertising and branding.

Born in Nairobi, Kenya, Fletcher moved to England at age five, and studied at four art schools: Hammersmith School of Art, Central School of Art, Royal College of Art (1953–1956) and lastly Yale School of Art and Architecture at Yale University in 1956.

== Early life ==
Fletcher was born in Nairobi, where his father was a civil servant, on September 27, 1931. When his father was terminally ill, he returned to England at the age of five with the rest of his family. After his father's death, he lived with his grandparents in Shepherd's Bush in West London, before being evacuated in 1939 to Christ's Hospital in Horsham.

He was a student at the Hammersmith School of Art from 1949, then at the Central School of Art, where he studied under typographer Anthony Froshaug and befriended Colin Forbes, Terence Conran, David Hicks, Peter Firmin, Theo Crosby, Derek Birdsall and Ken Garland. After a year teaching English at Berlitz Language School in Barcelona, he returned to London to study at the Royal College of Art from 1953 to 1956, where he met Peter Blake, Joe Tilson, Len Deighton, Denis Bailey, David Gentleman and Dick Smith.

He married Paola Biagi, an Italian national, in 1956 (they met with a heated discussion about if orange and pink were a good or bad colour pair). He then took up a scholarship to study at the Yale School of Art and Architecture at Yale University, under Alvin Eisenman, Norman Ives, Herbert Matter, Bradbury Thompson, Josef Albers and Paul Rand. During his time in the United States, Fletcher visited Robert Brownjohn, Ivan Chermayeff and Tom Geismar in New York, became friends with Bob Gill, and was commissioned by Leo Lionni to design a cover for Fortune magazine in 1958. After a visit to Venezuela, he returned to London in 1959, having worked briefly for Saul Bass in Los Angeles and Pirelli in Milan.

== Professional career ==
Fletcher founded a design firm called 'Fletcher/Forbes/Gill' with Colin Forbes and Bob Gill in 1962. Their early work was the 1963 book Graphic Design: A Visual Comparison published in John Lewis's Studio Paperbacks series. Their clients included Pirelli, Cunard, Penguin Books and Olivetti. In 1962, they co-founded British Design & Art Direction, along with David Bailey and Terence Donovan, which was later renamed Designers and Art Directors Association (D&AD).

Gill left the partnership in 1965 and was replaced by Theo Crosby, so the firm became Crosby/Fletcher/Forbes. Two new partners joined, and the partnership evolved into Pentagram in 1972, with Forbes, Crosby, Kenneth Grange and Mervyn Kurlansky, with clients including Lloyd's of London and Daimler Benz.

Much of his work is still in use: a logo for Reuters made up of 84 dots, which he created in 1965, was retired in 1996, but his 1989 "V&A" logo for Victoria and Albert Museum, and his "IoD" logo for the Institute of Directors remain in use. In last years he designed the logo for the Italian School of Architecture "Facolta' di Architettura di Alghero" (University of Sassari).

"Design is not a thing you do. It’s a way of life.” – Alan Fletcher

Fletcher left Pentagram in 1992, and worked from the home in Notting Hill that he had occupied since the early 1960s, where he was assisted by his daughter Raffaella Fletcher, Leah Klein and Sarah Copplestone, and worked for new clients, such as Novartis. Much of his later work was as art director for the publisher Phaidon Press, which he joined in 1993. For him, life and work were inseparable: "Design is not a thing you do. It's a way of life." He would continue working until his death, even on holiday, drawing on a notepad with a pencil.

A book of his designs, Beware Wet Paint, was published by Jeremy Myerson in 1994. Fletcher also wrote several books about graphic design and visual thinking, most notably The Art of Looking Sideways (2001), which had taken him 18 years to finish.

An exhibition of his life's work was displayed at the Design Museum in London between 11 November 2006 until 18 February 2007, alongside the posthumous publication of a book, Picturing and Poeting. The exhibition went on tour in 2008. It was installed at the Ginza Graphic Gallery in Tokyo between 9 and 31 May 2008, and was installed at the Pitzhanger Manor Gallery in Ealing, West London, between 14 November 2008 and 3 January 2009.

Fletcher won the 1993 Prince Philip Designers Prize given by the Design Council, was President of the D&AD (Designers and Art Directors Association) in 1973 and International President of the Alliance Graphique Internationale from 1982 to 1985. He was elected to the Hall of Fame of the New York Art Directors Club in 1994, was a senior fellow of the Royal College of Art in 1989 and became an honorary fellow of the London Institute in 2000.

The December 2006 limited-edition cover of Wallpaper magazine featured one of his last works omitting his calligraphic signature in the compliments slip accompanying his completed work for he was too frail by then.

== Death ==
Fletcher died September 21, 2006, aged 74, of cancer, at his daughter's home in East Sussex, England. Multiple obituaries reported that he wore a t-shirt with a graphic that read "I don’t know where I’m going, but I’m on my way’' at the time of his death.
