= Kenneth Grange =

British industrial designer (1929–2024)

Sir Kenneth Grange CBE RDI
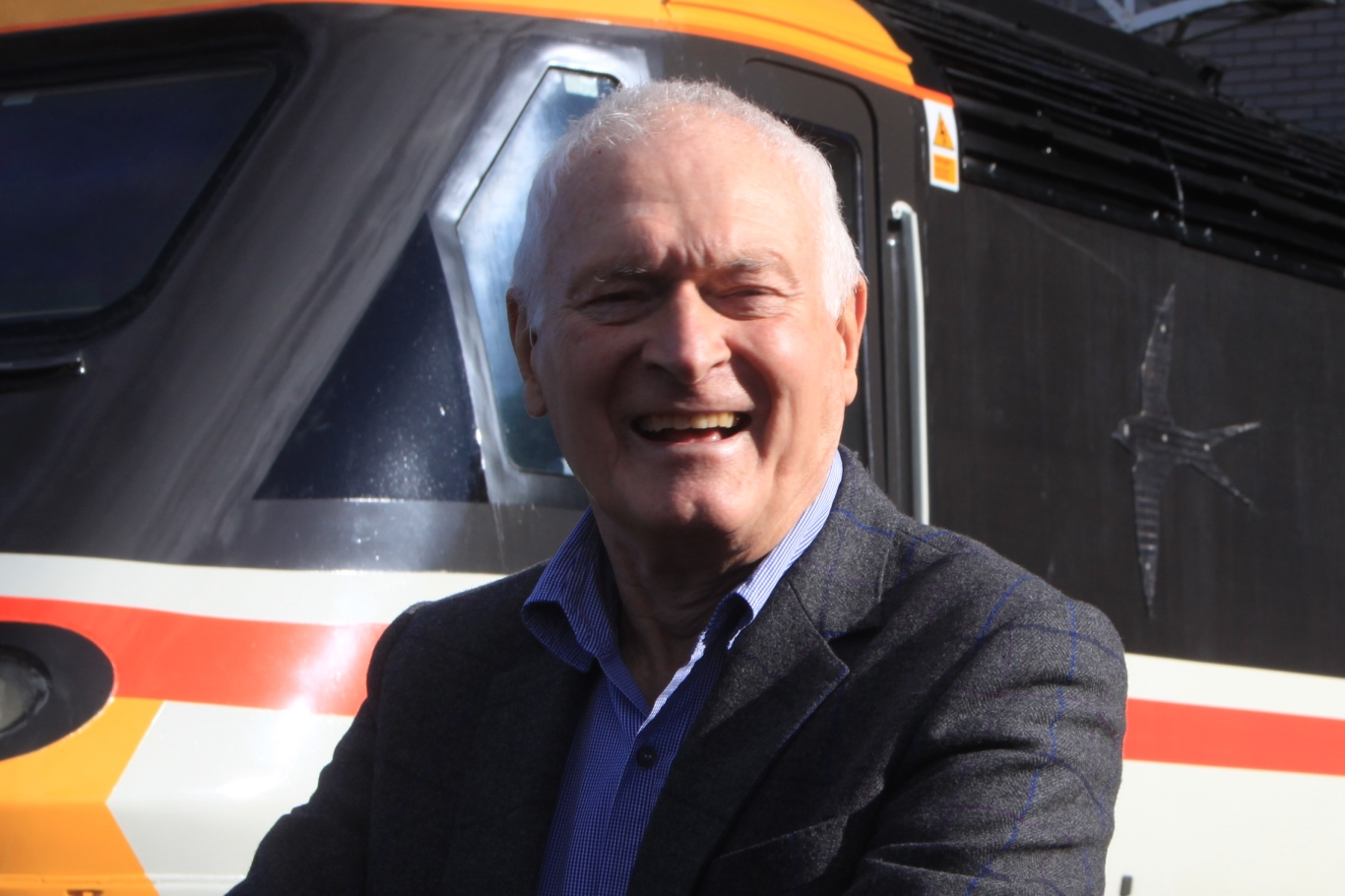
- Born: 17 July 1929; London, United Kingdom
- Died: 21 July 2024 (aged 95); London, United Kingdom
- Citizenship: British
- Education: Willesden College of Technology
- Occupation: Product designer
- Known for: Intercity 125; TX1 taxi; Anglepoise lamp type 3 (2002); Venner parking meter; Adshel bench; Kenwood mini mixer; Rural pillar box (1996); Kenwood Chef food mixer
- Spouses: Assunta Santella (m. 1952; div. 1971) Philippa Algeo (m. 1971; div. 1984) Apryl Swift (m. 1984)
- Parent(s): Hilda (nee Long); Harry Grange

Sir Kenneth Henry Grange CBE RDI (17 July 1929 – 21 July 2024) was a British industrial designer, renowned for a wide range of designs for familiar, everyday objects. He was also a co-founder of Pentagram design in 1972.

== Early life ==
Kenneth Henry Grange was born on 17 July 1929, in east London. His mother, Hilda (née Long), was a machinist and his father, Harry, a policeman. The family moved to Wembley, north London at the outbreak of the second world war, where his father was a bomb disposal officer. Following the move, Grange changed schools from a fee-paying school (where he had a scholarship) in the City of London offering a classical education, to one where "making and creativity" were prioritised. In 1944 he was awarded a scholarship to study commercial art at the Willesden School of Art and Crafts.

After a brief job as a scene painter with the BBC at their Alexandra Palace TV studios, Grange was called up for National Service and between 1948 and 1949 was posted in the Royal Engineers as a technical illustrator making drawings for military equipment instruction manuals. He later recorded that this work was his introduction to engineering and a fascination with the way machines work.

== Career ==
Grange's design career began in the early 1950s, working as a drafting assistant to a series of architects: Arcon, Bronek Katz and R Vaughan, Gordon and Ursula Bowyer and, from 1952, with the architect and industrial designer Jack Howe. In 1951, Grange took part in the Festival of Britain, while working for Gordon and Ursula Bowyer on the Sports Pavilion for the South Bank exhibition.

In 1956, Grange set up his own design consultancy, with many of his early commissions coming from the Council of Industrial Design, such as, in 1958, a design for Britain’s first parking meter, the Venner. Then in 1972, Grange, along with Alan Fletcher, Colin Forbes, Theo Crosby and Mervyn Kurlansky, was a founding partner in Pentagram, an interdisciplinary design consultancy.

Grange's career spanned more than half a century, and many of his designs became familiar items in the household or on the street. These designs included kettles and food mixers for Kenwood, razors for Wilkinson Sword, cameras for Kodak, typewriters for Imperial, clothes irons for Morphy Richards, cigarette lighters for Ronson, washing machines for Bendix, pens for Parker, Adshel bus shelters, Reuters computers, and regional Royal Mail postboxes.

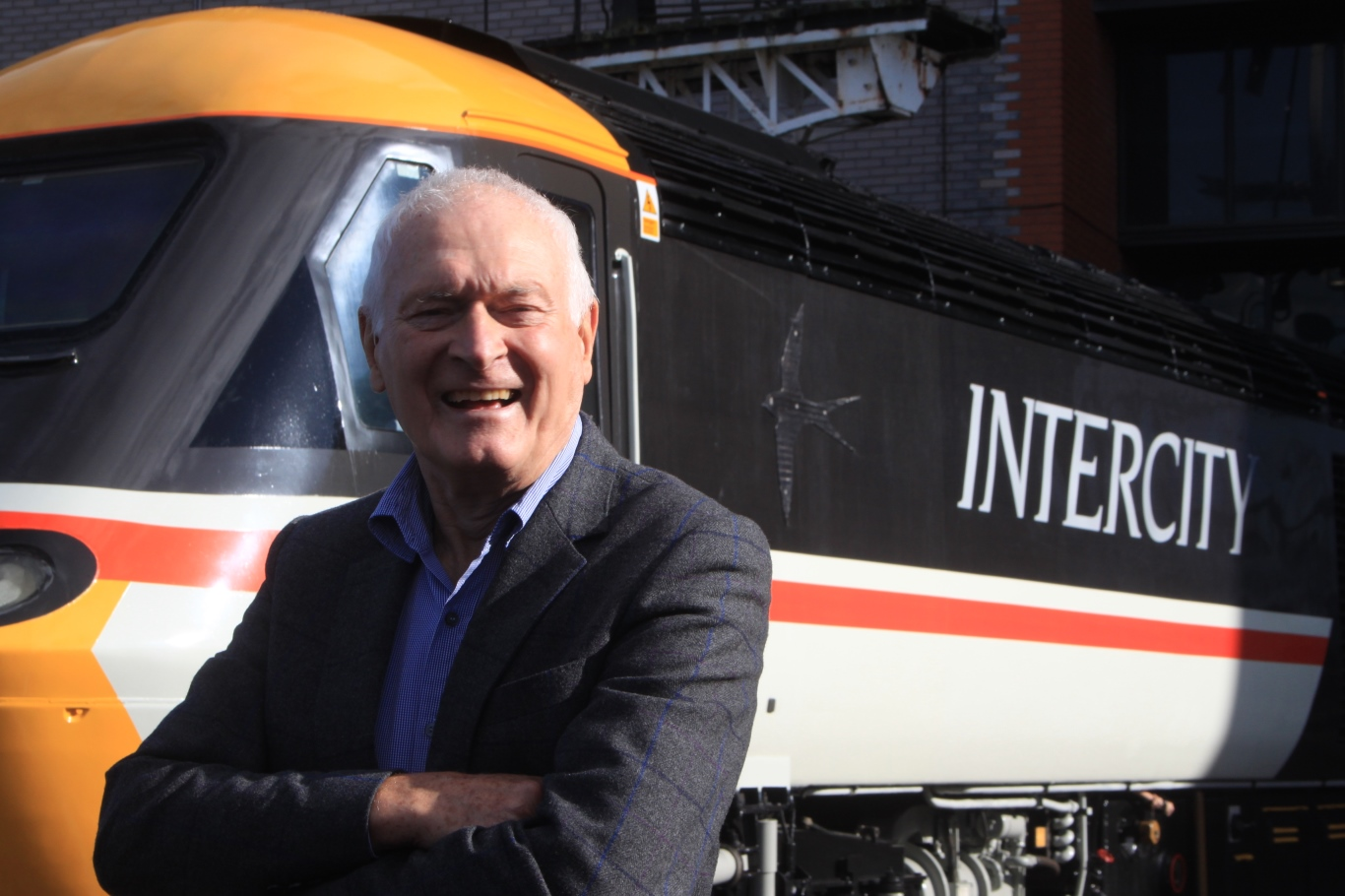
Kenneth Grange in October 2016 with an InterCity 125 power car 43185 at National Railway Museum in York, the nose cone for which he designed in the 1970s.

In 1968, Grange was responsible for the interior layout and exterior shaping of the cab and nose cone of British Rail's new High Speed Train (HST), the InterCity 125. Having initially only been commissioned to restyle the paintwork of the original engine design, he researched the aerodynamics and engineering details and offered the revised version to the British Rail board, who accepted the more efficient design which, following further development and production, was launched in 1976.

40 years later, on the anniversary of the first passenger services of the Intercity 125, the first production HST power car, number 43002, was repainted by Great Western Railway in the original British Rail Inter-City livery and named the 'Sir Kenneth Grange' in honour of Grange. The train was revealed, by Grange, on 2 May 2016 at St Philip's Marsh GWR HST depot in Bristol. Grange later visited York in October 2016, and 'signed' power car 43185 using spray paint.

Grange was also involved in the design of the 1997 LTI TX1 version of the famous London taxicab. He carried out many commissions for Japanese companies, including another radical 're-styling' of a sewing machine designed for the Maruzen Sewing Machine Co in Osaka, to be marketed in Europe.

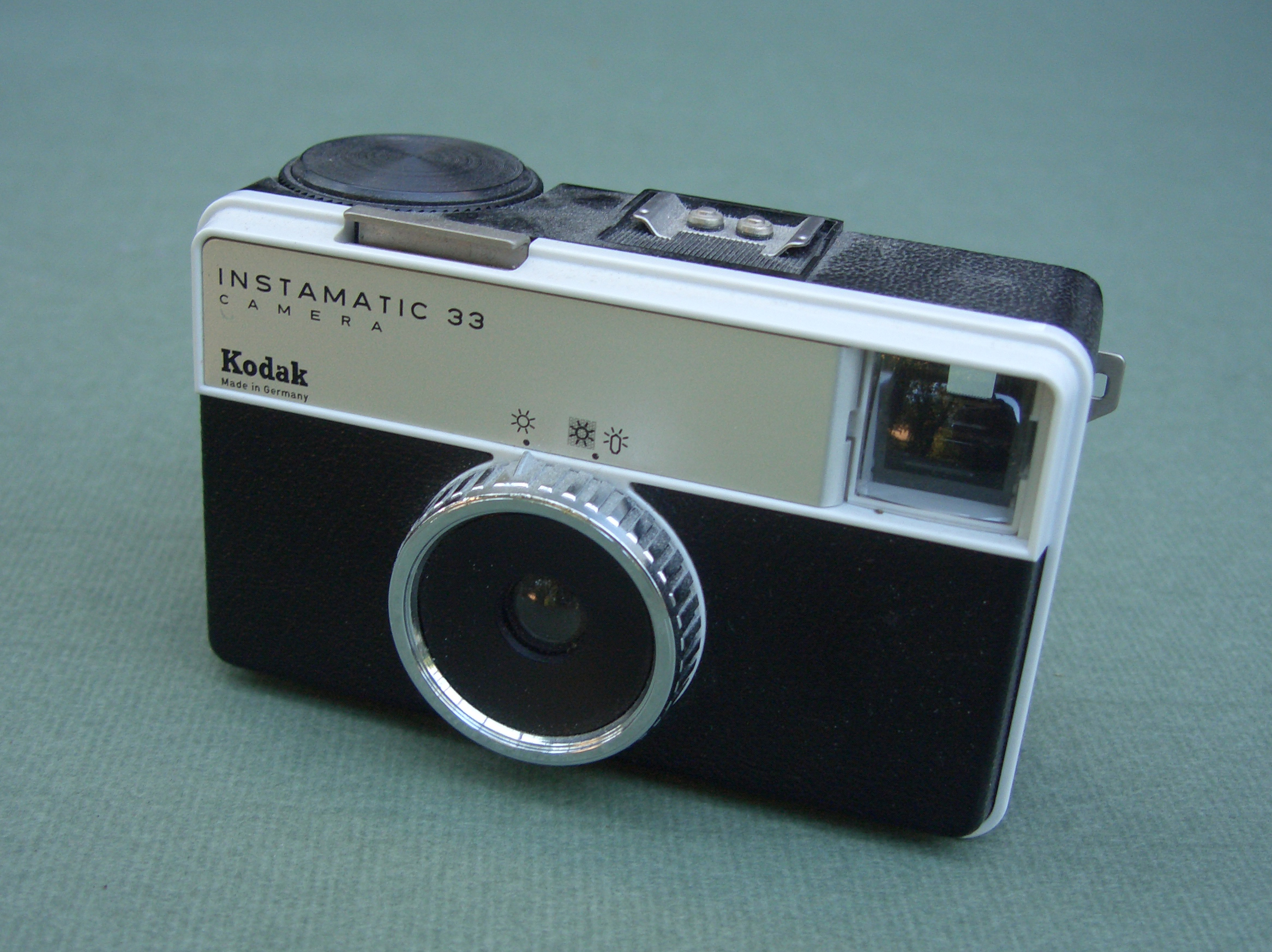
Kenneth Grange's Kodak Instamatic camera (c. 1963)

After retiring from Pentagram in 1997, Grange continued to work independently. This work included door handles for izé, desk and floor lamps for Anglepoise, and a chair for the elderly for Hitch Mylius.

From 2005, Grange was a visiting professor at the Royal College of Art.

The Design Museum in London held a major retrospective exhibition of Grange's work, July–October 2011.

A consistent quality of much of Grange's design work was that it was not based on just the styling of a product. His design concepts arose from a fundamental reassessment of the purpose, function and use of the product. He also said that his attitude to designing any product was that he wanted it to be "a pleasure to use".

He was critical of Apple when their designs didn't meet his "pleasure to use" criterion, saying in a 2014 interview, "I’ve got two Apple computers. Both of them are bloody difficult to find the switch for on and off. It’s a conceit that they assume that you’re part of their world, that you’ve been such an ardent admirer that you’ve been allowed through the door of knowing where the button is. If you’re smart enough and your fingers are delicate enough, just around that corner is something that you won’t even know you’ve moved, but just around that corner, you know you’ve been successful because the light comes on." He made broader criticisms in another interview, stating: "I've got a certain cynicism of Apple and their motives. It's a bit of a monster."

== Personal life ==
Grange married Assunta Santella in 1952 and Philippa Algeo in 1971. Both marriages ended in divorce. In 1984, Grange married Apryl Swift in London.

Grange bought his home in Hampstead, north London in 1969, previously living in Highgate. In 1997, after retirement from Pentagram, he bought and spent the next five years renovating a stone-built barn in Coryton, Devon into a home. He shared his time between Devon and London, commuting weekly.

In an interview with The Times in 2020, Grange was asked what his most curious design was. He answered: "My coffin. When my mother died, we had to choose from a photo album of coffins. I couldn't leave Apryl to bury me in one of them, so I made my own. And that's what we've got standing in the hall in Devon, serving as a bookcase until I go."

== Death and legacy ==
Grange died on 21 July 2024, at the age of 95. He was survived by his wife, Apryl.

A number of tributes were paid to him, including from Pentagram design, his former employer Anglepoise, the 125 group and from across the design industry.

A new book on his life and work, entitled ‘Kenneth Grange: Designing the Modern World’ authored by Lucy Johnston, was published in 2024 by Thames & Hudson. Sir Jonathan Ive provided the foreword, stating that his favourite design was the Inter-City 125 train: "I remember taking a day return from London to Bath solely to ride on his train. I love its complete rejection of arbitrary form, or space-age design aspirations without function." “...For his services to humility, for his love of making and his enormous impact on the visual culture, Sir Kenneth Grange is a hero of mine and of British design."

Grange has left his archive to the V&A museum with it being hosted in V&A East Storehouse

== Honours ==
Grange was appointed Commander of the Order of the British Empire (CBE) in the 1984 New Year Honours and knighted for services to design in the 2013 New Year Honours. Grange's designs won ten Design Council Awards, the Prince Philip Designers Prize in 1963 and again in 2001 – an award honouring a lifetime achievement. He won the Gold Medal of the Chartered Society of Designers, and in 1986 was made a member of the Royal Society of Arts' élite Faculty of 'Royal Designers for Industry'. Grange was awarded honorary Doctorates by the Royal College of Art, De Montfort University, Plymouth University, Heriot-Watt University, Staffordshire University and the Open University.

Grange was the Honorary President of the 125 Group which aims to preserve operational examples of the subsequent production HST vehicles. The very first HST, number 43002, was renamed as "Sir Kenneth Grange" in 2016 and was subsequently given to the National Railway Museum Collection in York, in September 2019 after withdrawal from service and went on permanent display in the Great Hall.

== In media ==
In April 2022 Grange was featured in the BBC Two series Secrets of the (Victoria and Albert) Museum.

He co-wrote two books, Living by Design and The Compendium and wrote the foreword to 125 – The Enduring Icon, Kenwood: The Ultimate Guide To Kitchen Tech: Part One: 1947–1976 and The Industrial Resolution: New thinking on closed loop product design and manufacturing.

Talking to Kirsty Young on BBC's Desert Island Discs, on 1 January 2017, he chose his luxury item to be a trombone, and his book to be Bauhaus by Hans Maria Wingler.

The Royal Society of Arts has an audio recording of Grange in a discussion of his work.

Following his death in July 2024, an obituary of Grange was featured on BBC Radio 4 programme Last Word.

== Gallery ==
Selected products designed by Kenneth Grange
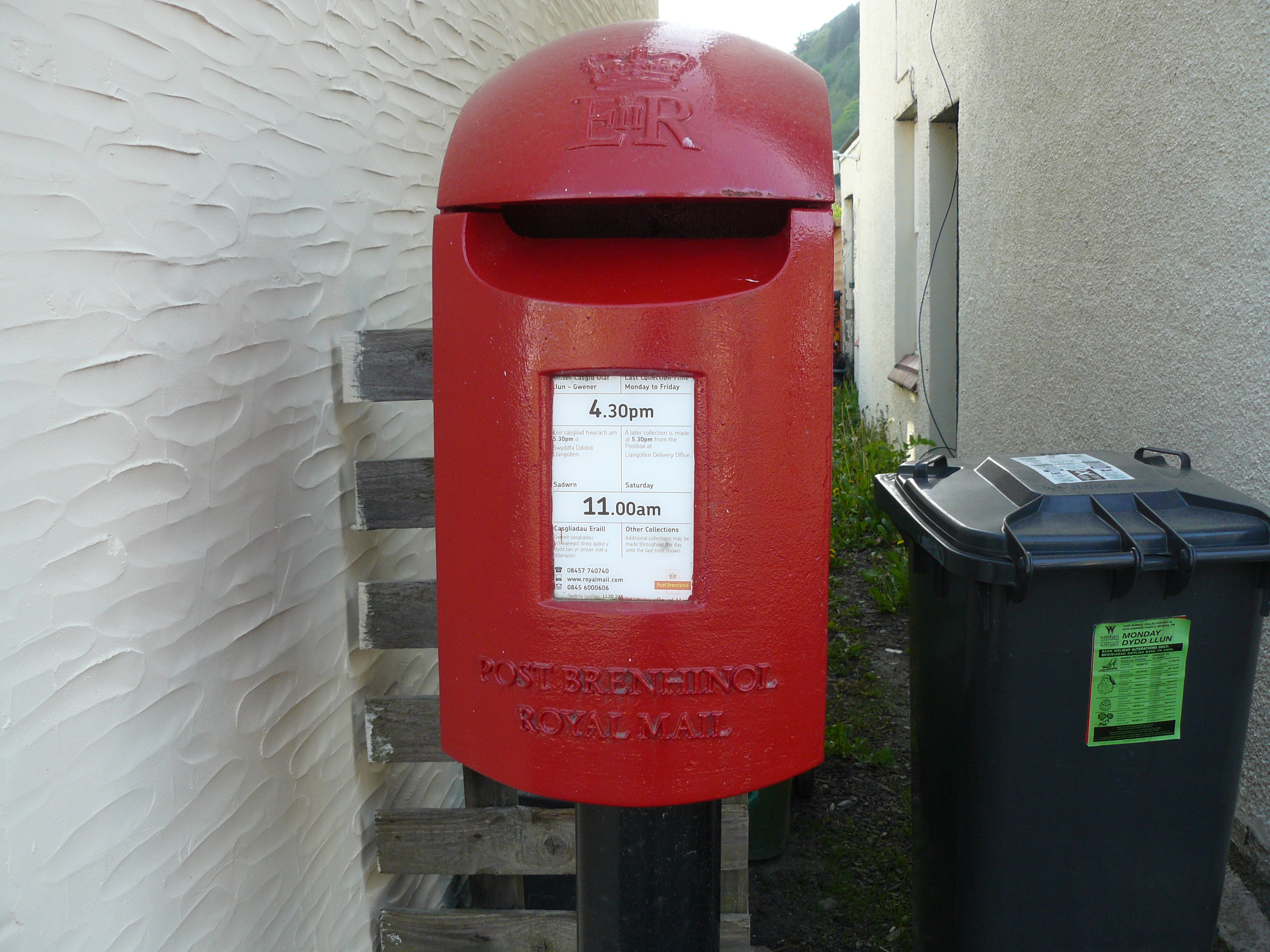
Bantam Post Box, 1999.

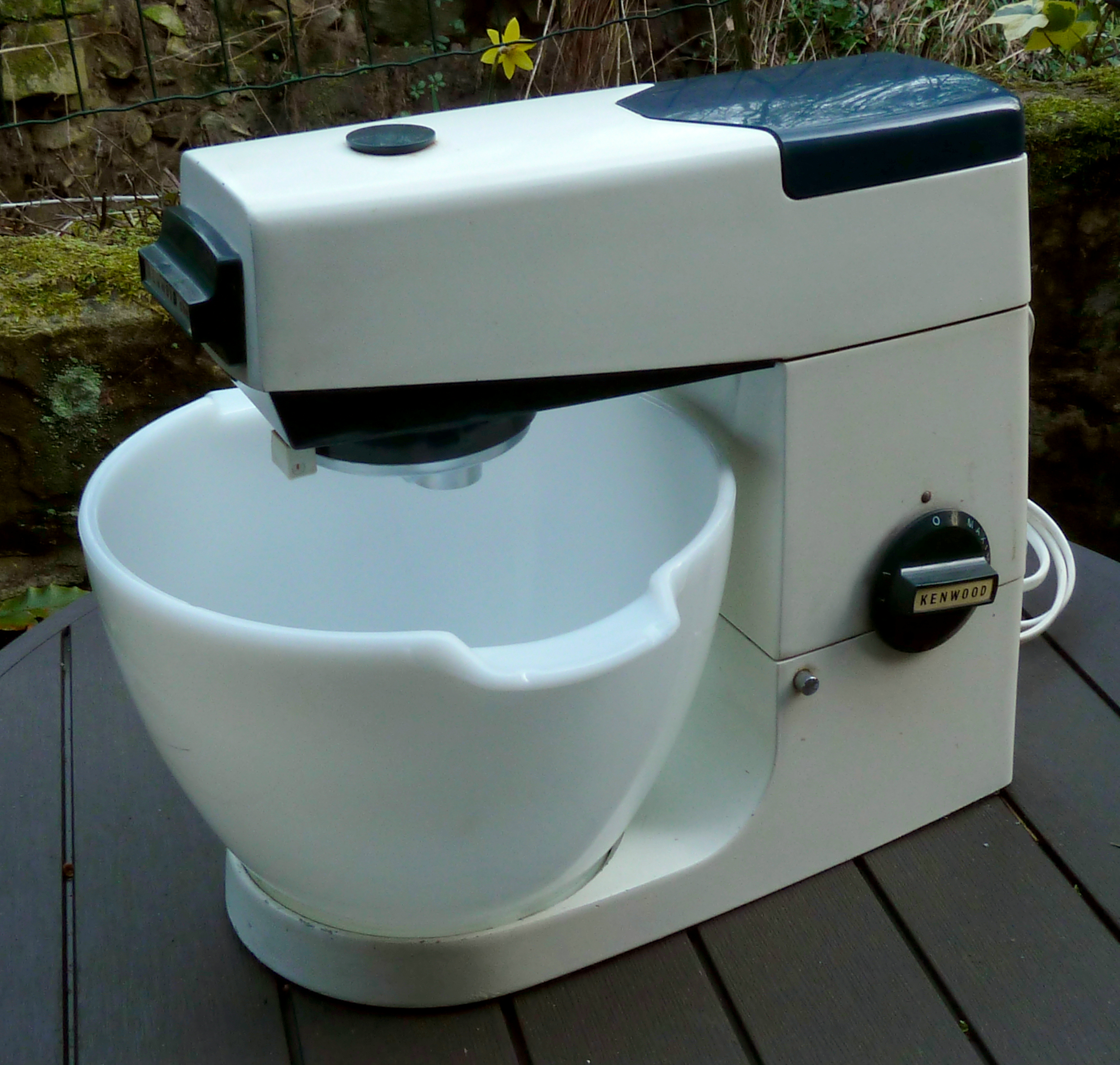
Kenwood Chef model A701a, 1960. This version from 1981.

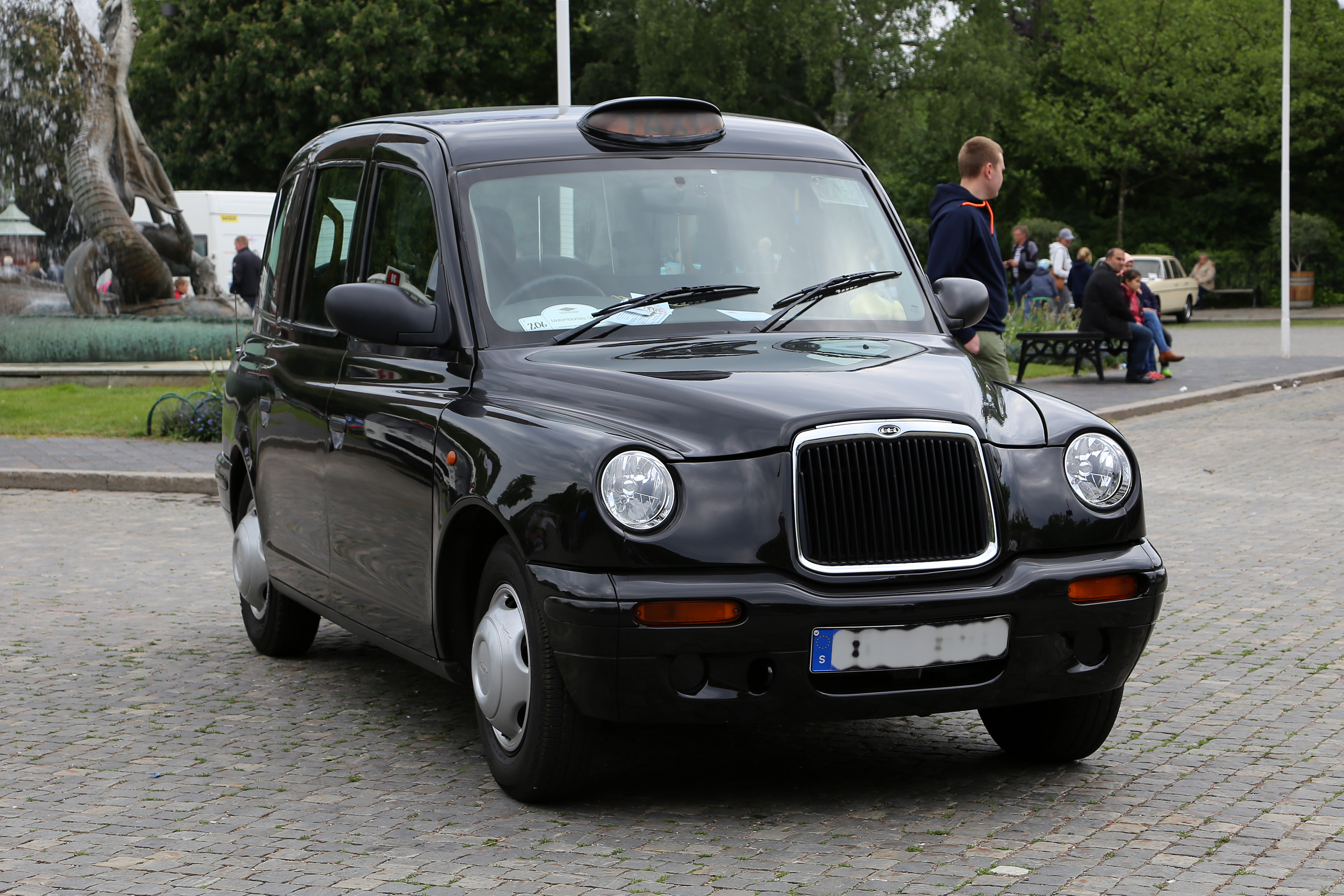
The London-Taxi LTI TX4, built in 2007.

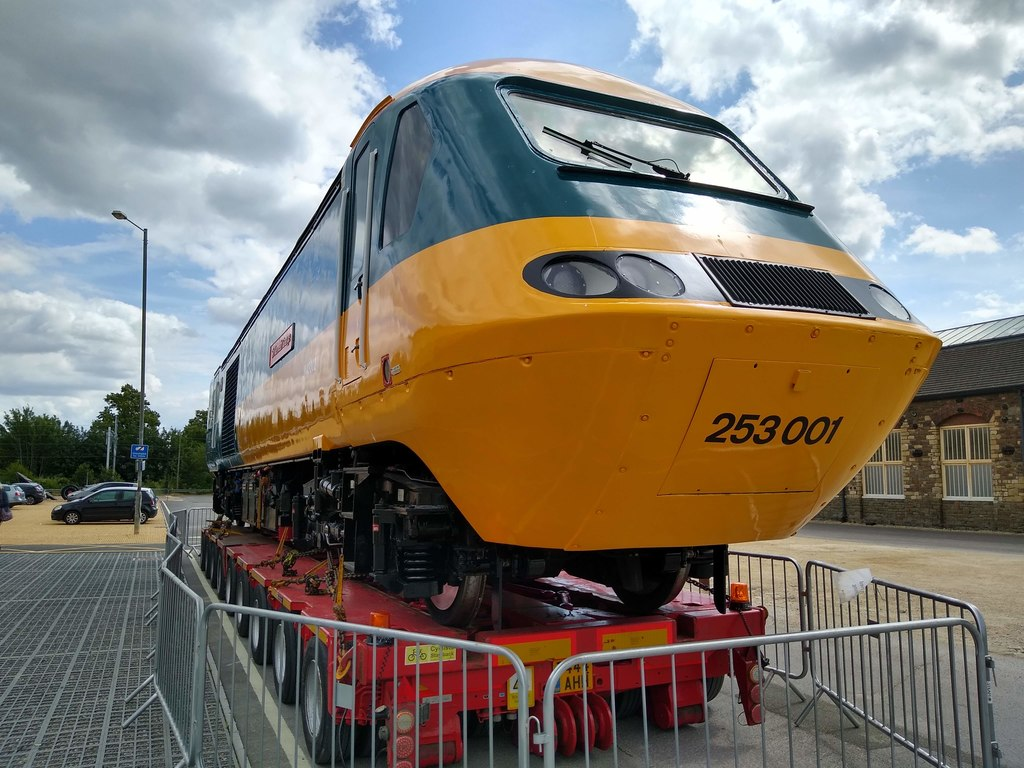
High Speed Train 125 (HST 125) power car 43002 Sir Kenneth Grange, 'Steam' museum, Swindon.

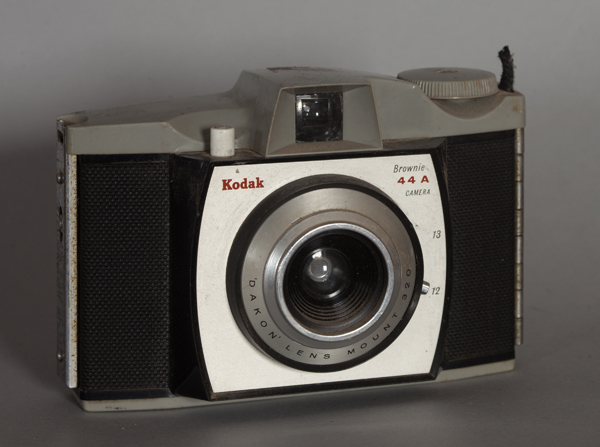
Photo camera. Kodak, Brownie 44A.
