= Trinity High School (River Forest, Illinois) =

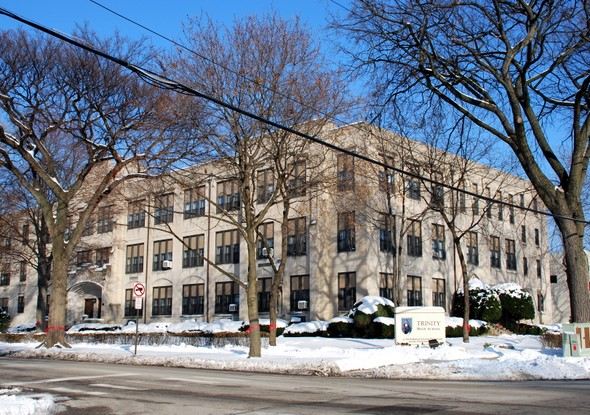
- Trinity High School main campus

Location
- 7574 West Division Street; River Forest, Illinois 60305; United States; 41°54′7″N 87°48′52″W

Information
- Type: private
- Motto: Captain Blazer
- Denomination: Roman Catholic
- Established: 1918
- Oversight: Archdiocese of Chicago
- President: Mrs. Laura Curley
- Principal: n/a
- Staff: 40+
- Faculty: 35.5 FTE
- Teaching staff: > 50
- Grades: 9–12
- Gender: all-female
- Enrollment: 500 (2017-2018)
- Average class size: 15 students
- Student to teacher ratio: 12:1
- Campus: urban
- Campus size: small
- Campus type: small
- Colors: Navy Blue and White
- Slogan: Be a Blazer Be Bold, Be Brave, Be Brilliant
- Fight song: B, B - L - A - A- A- A, B-L-A-Z-E-R-S, BLAZERS BLAZERS ARE THE BEST
- Athletics conference: Girls Catholic Athletic (GCAC), Metropolitan Catholic Aquatics Conference (MCAC)
- Sports: basketball, bowling, cross country, golf, soccer, lacrosse, softball, swimming, tennis, track & field, and volleyball
- Mascot: Captain Blazer
- Team name: Blazers
- Accreditation: North Central Association of Colleges and Schools
- Newspaper: Blaze
- Yearbook: Wyndword
- School fees: 650 entrance fee
- Tuition: 14,500
- Affiliation: Sinsinawa Dominican
- Website: www.trinityhs.org

Trinity High School is a Roman Catholic college preparatory high school for girls located in River Forest, a suburb of Chicago, Illinois. Located in the Roman Catholic Archdiocese of Chicago, it was founded in 1918 by members of the Sinsinawa Dominican Sisters. Originally the school was built on the grounds of Rosary College, which is now Dominican University, but in 1926 the campus was relocated a few blocks away from the original site. Today, Trinity High School has an enrollment of 500 young women divided among four grade levels. Trinity students come from 45 zip codes and 144 different grade schools.

== Academics ==
Trinity offers two types of curricula - college preparatory classes and International Baccalaureate classes. Trinity is officially affiliated with the International Baccalaureate Organization in Geneva, Switzerland. On average, 50% of the student body take IB courses. All classes are taught on the block scheduling scheme. The IB classes offered at Trinity include English (higher level); a history class including 20th century history of European conflicts and world dictators, as well as American and Canadian history (higher level); biology (higher level); art and design (higher or standard level); mathematical methods (standard level); mathematical studies (standard level); Spanish language (standard level); French language (standard level); Italian language (standard level); information technology in a global society (standard level); and film studies (standard level). Students may opt to go for certification in one or more subjects of their choice (IB Certificate Programme), or enter into the IB Diploma Programme. In each graduating class, approximately fifteen to twenty students complete the IB Diploma Programme, which involves taking six IB subjects, completing 150 hours of service in two years, writing a 4,000 word research paper on a subject of the student's choice, and completing a philosophy course known as "Theory of Knowledge." All students are required to take speech, health, keyboarding, computer applications, business, fine arts, and theology classes before graduating. Trinity has a fine arts curriculum, including classes in singing, acting, drawing, painting, and other styles of artistic expression.

Trinity students have the potential to graduate with 5.5 credits in math and 6.25 credits in science. Trinity students graduate with 32 credits. 100% of 2017 Trinity graduates were accepted into a college or university.

== Student life ==
=== Athletics ===
All Trinity students are required to enroll in two years of physical education classes. In addition, the school offers eleven sports, each with a varsity and a junior varsity level, to its young women. These sports include basketball, bowling, cross country, golf, soccer, lacrosse, softball, swimming, tennis, track, volleyball, and ice hockey.

Trinity ice hockey players play under the Fenwick name. The team is combined with players who attend Guerin College Preparatory High School, Fenwick High School, York High School, OPRF High School, Taft High School, and Lane Tech.

Trinity's athletics are high acclaimed throughout Chicago. Many student-athletes who attended Trinity High School have continued their education and athletic careers at D1, D2, and D3 universities.

=== Activities ===
Trinity High School offers over thirty extracurricular activities and clubs, ranging from academic clubs such as Math Team to service clubs such as the Environment Club and Youth Ending Hunger to fine arts clubs such as the Art Club, La Trinita Choir, ACapella Choir, Gospel Choir, and Le Regazze Choir. Trinity's monthly newspaper is called The Blaze, its yearbook is called The Wyndword, and its Media Club produces television broadcasts on WTHS.

Eligible Trinity students can be inducted into the National Honor Society, Science National Honor Society, Spanish National Honor Society, French National Honor Society, Italian National Honor Society, Quill and Scroll, and the International Thespian Society, typically in their junior year.

99% of Trinity's student body participates in a sport, club, or other co-curricular activity.

== Notable alumnae ==
- Anne Walsh Willer, Illinois state representative
