= Willer (given name) =

Willer is a given name. Notable people with the given name include:

- Willer Bordon (1949–2015), Italian, academic, businessman and former politician
- Willer Souza Oliveira (born 1979), Brazilian professional football player

== See also ==
- Willer (surname)
- Willer (disambiguation)
