= Bob Gill (artist) =

American artist (1931–2021)

- Born: Robert Charles Gill; January 17, 1931; Brooklyn, New York, U.S.
- Died: November 9, 2021 (aged 90); Brooklyn, New York, U.S.
- Education: Philadelphia Museum School of Art; Pennsylvania Academy of Fine Arts; City College of New York
- Occupations: Graphic designer, illustrator
- Spouse: Sara Fishko
- Children: Two

Robert Charles Gill (January 17, 1931 – November 9, 2021) was an American illustrator, graphic designer and author. Prolific and influential creative, Gill was notable for his concept-driven designs that blended graphic design and illustration, and popularized the use of visual puns and short, direct copy.

Together with Alan Fletcher and Colin Forbes, Gill co-founded British design company Fletcher/Forbes/Gill that after his departure grew into the international consultancy Pentagram. They also founded D&AD, a long-standing British educational organization in design and art direction.

Gill was known for his work as design educator and as author and designer of many widely referenced books on graphic design, advertising and visual culture. He also co-created 1977 Broadway musical Beatlemania, illustrated multiple children's books, and designed film titles for films and TV.

== Early life and education ==
Robert Charles Gill was born on January 17, 1931, in the Crown Heights neighborhood in Brooklyn, New York. He was raised by a single mother, Frieda Gill (née Gotthelf), who struggled to earn a living as a piano teacher. Gill learned to play piano from his mother, and was in a jazz band by age 10. He played the piano at summer resorts in the Catskill Mountains, New York, to pay his school tuition.

He attended the Philadelphia Museum School of Art (1948–1951), Pennsylvania Academy of Fine Arts (1951), City College of New York (1952, 1955). After serving in the U.S. Army in Washington D.C. from 1952 until 1954, he moved back to New York City.

== Career ==
=== Early career ===
After returning to New York in 1954, Gill established himself as freelance graphic artist and illustrator. His early work included film and TV title graphics, and illustrations for children’s books and magazines like Glamour, Esquire, Fortune, Seventeen, and The Nation. Early in his career, he was awarded Art Directors Club Gold Medal for the design of title card of Private Secretary, a CBS sitcom. Gill also acted as a film title designer, referred to as a production designer, for several films of Ray Harryhausen.

In 1960, after an interview in a New York hotel room for a job in London, he moved to the UK to work for an advertising agency Charles Hobson.

=== Fletcher/Forbes/Gill ===
On April Fools' Day 1962, Gill, Alan Fletcher and Colin Forbes established Fletcher/Forbes/Gill design studio, the forerunner of Pentagram. It was one of the first designer-led agencies in London. In addition to the three founding partners, Fletcher/Forbes/Gill (commonly abbreviated as F/F/G) initially only employed two assistants and one secretary, and worked out of a former mews house near Baker Street in London. Their early clients included Penguin, Pirelli and Time Life. F/F/G soon outgrew their small studio and moved into a huge Victorian former gun factory on a canal. Discussing the company’s founding in 1999 Gill told the Eye magazine:

I met Forbes through Fletcher – they were working in Forbes's apartment as freelancers sharing expenses. This was after becoming disenchanted with the agency. It was a strange situation because if I had told Nicholas Kaye (the owner of the agency, who liked to think of me as his son) I was going to quit, as kind as he was and as generous as he was, he could have had me assassinated.

And then I had an inspiration. I went to him after Fletcher, Forbes and I decided to get together and I said: “Nicholas – let’s quit” and he said: “What are you talking about?” I said “Let’s get out of here and start a design office.”

Well, he was so moved by the fact I wanted to take him with me so he said: “No, you go. I’ll finance it and I’ll feed work to it from the agency – packaging and so forth, and I’ll be a silent partner – I don’t want my name on it."

In 1962, Gill, Fletcher and Forbes also started the British Design and Art Direction, a long-standing educational organization now known as the Designers and Art Directors Association, abbreviated as D&AD.

Graphic design: Visual Comparisons, a 1963 book co-authored by the three partners of F/F/G, sold more than 100,000 copies.

Gill would go on to influence 1960s music by telling his then assistant, Charlie Watts that he was better drummer than a designer and urging him to join a then-unknown band The Rolling Stones.

In 1967, Gill, reluctant to grow the company, left the partnership and assumed independent freelancing again, including teaching, filmmaking and writing children's books. He later said that he considered leaving Fletcher/Forbes/Gill the biggest mistake he ever made.

=== Freelance ===
He returned to New York in 1975 to write and design Beatlemania, the largest multimedia musical up to that time on Broadway, on which he worked with Robert Rabinowitz. He also proposed a peace monument for Times Square, for which Gill wanted to collect military junk from all over the world, pile it 40 feet high, spray it matte black, and mount it on a block of white marble. The New York City Fine Arts Commission rejected the project.

Gill designed for Apple Corps records, Rainbow Theatre, Pirelli, Nestlé, Universal Pictures, Joseph Losey, Queen (now Harpers & Queen), High Times magazines and the United Nations.

== Influence and legacy ==
Gill's works are notable for blurring the lines between graphic design and illustration. An early proponent of concept-driven advertising and graphic design, Gill advocated for original graphic solutions determined not by popular styles, but by the problem posed in the creative brief and the context of the assignment. He popularized the use of visual puns and clear, direct messaging in advertising.

Gill is an author of more than 20 widely referenced books on graphic design, advertising and visual culture. He was elected to the New York Art Directors Club Hall of Fame in 1991 and received a Lifetime Achievement Award from the Designers and Art Directors Association of London.

His book Forget All the Rules You Ever Learned About Graphic Design—Including the Ones in This Book was first published in 1981 and according to Steven Heller of Print magazine, "it vividly represented Gill’s irrepressible, rebellious wit". The Branvetica said it "...encapsulated his philosophy that design should be about solving problems creatively rather than adhering to established norms."

== Personal life ==
He lived in New York with his wife, New York Public Radio's Sara Fishko. They had a son, Jack Gill, and a daughter, Kate Gill. Gill died on November 9, 2021, in Brooklyn, aged 90.

== Teaching ==
- 1955–1960, School of Visual Arts (SVA), Manhattan
- 1959, Pratt Institute, Brooklyn
- 1967–1969, Central School of Art and Design, London
- 1969, Chelsea School of Art (now Chelsea College of Art and Design), London
- 1970–1975, Royal College of Art (RCA), London
- 1972–1974, Hornsey School of Art, London
- 1981–1983, Parsons School of Design (now Parsons The New School for Design), Manhattan
- 1992–1994, School of Visual Arts (SVA), Manhattan
- 2003–2011, Graduate Communications Department, Pratt Institute, Manhattan

== Awards ==
- 1955, Gold Medal, New York Art Directors Club, for title card design of CBS's Private Secretary, US
- 1999, President's Award, D&AD (British Design & Art Direction), UK

== Books written ==
- What Colour Is Your World?, Anthony Blond Limited, 1962 (republished by Phaidon, 2008)
- Graphic design: visual comparisons, New York: Reinhold, 1964
- Bob Gill's Portfolio, Amsterdam: Wim Crouwel / Stedelijk Museum, 1967
- Bob Gill’s Portfolio, London: Lund Humphries, 1968
- I Keep Changing, New York: Scroll Press, 1971 | ISBN 0-87592-025-X
- Bob Gill's New York, London: Kynoch Press, 1971
- Ups & Downs, Reading, Massachusetts: Addison-Wesley, 1974
- Forget All the Rules You Ever Learned About Graphic Design, Including the Ones in this Book, New York: Watson-Guptill, 1981 | ISBN 0-8230-1863-6
- Graphic Design Made Difficult, New York: Van Nostrand Reinhold, 1992 | ISBN 0-442-01098-2
- Unspecial Effects for Graphic Designers, New York: Graphis, 2001 | ISBN 1-931241-00-7
- Graphic Design as a Second Language, Victoria: Images Publishing Group, 2003 | ISBN 1-920744-39-8
- Illustration, Victoria: Images Publishing Group, 2004 | ISBN 1-920744-73-8
- LogoMania, Gloucester: Rockport Publishers, 2006 | ISBN 1-59253-252-7
- Words into Pictures, Victoria: Images Publishing Group, 2009 | ISBN 1-86470-326-1
- Bob Gill, so far., London: Laurence King Publishing, 2011 | ISBN 1-85669-819-X
