= Pentagram (design firm) =

International design studio

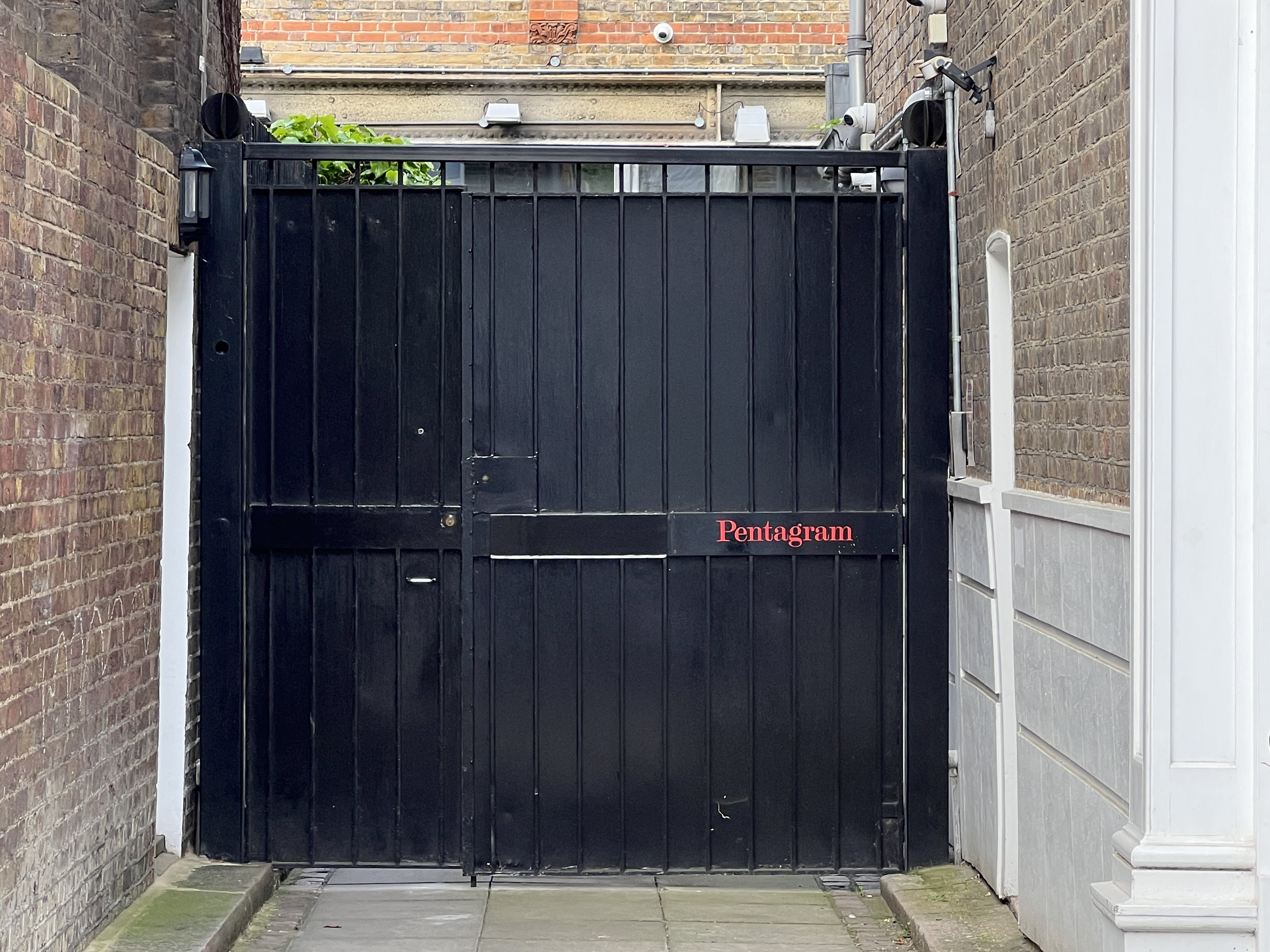
- Industry: Design
- Founded: 12 June 1972 in Notting Hill, London, United Kingdom
- Founders: Alan Fletcher; Theo Crosby; Colin Forbes; Kenneth Grange; Mervyn Kurlansky
- Headquarters: United Kingdom
- Products: Design consultancy, graphic design, corporate identity, architecture, interiors and products
- Website: pentagram.com

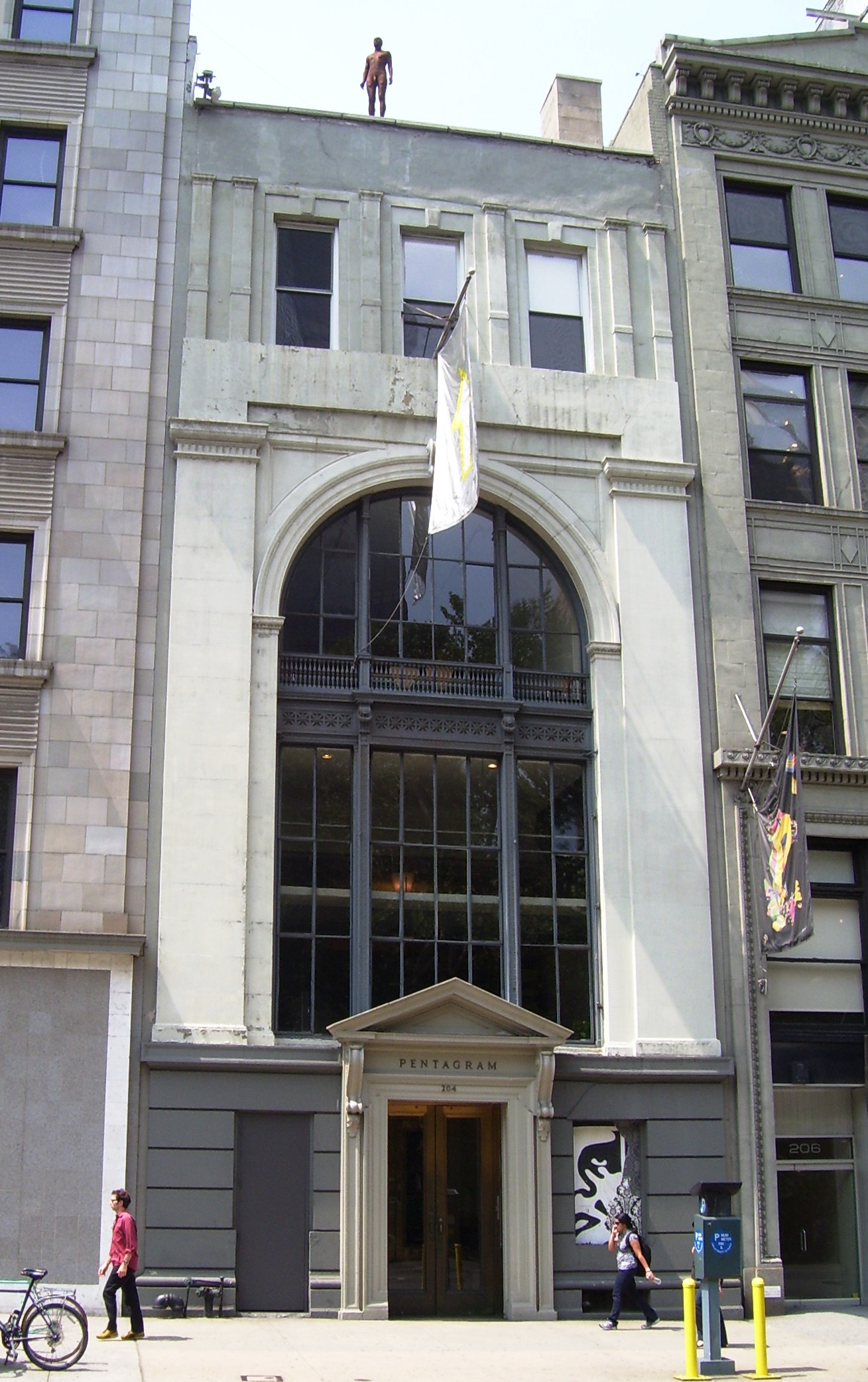
The former Pentagram building in Manhattan, at 204 Fifth Avenue, was designed by C.P.H. Gilbert. On top of the building at the time this image was taken (2010) is a statue by Antony Gormley, part of his Event Horizon installation on buildings around Madison Square.

Pentagram is a design firm founded in 1972 by Alan Fletcher, Theo Crosby, Colin Forbes, Kenneth Grange and Mervyn Kurlansky in Notting Hill, London. The company has offices in London, New York City, Berlin and Austin, Texas.

In addition to its influential body of work, the firm is known for its unusual structure in the design industry, in which a hierarchically flat group of partners own and manage the firm. It restricts ownership to only designers, each of whom are responsible for their team and the clients they manage, while sharing some resources and central staff.

== History ==
Alan Fletcher, Colin Forbes, and Bob Gill announced the opening of design studio Fletcher/Forbes/Gill on 1 April 1962. Gill left the firm in 1965, and Fletcher and Forbes were joined by architect Theo Crosby, forming Crosby/Fletcher/Forbes that year.

=== This Is Tomorrow ===
The inspiration behind establishing a partner-based model for the firm came about when Theo Crosby created and was part of working group one at the "This is Tomorrow" exhibition, hosted at the Whitechapel Gallery from 9 August to 9 September 1956. The exhibition was formed by an independent group of British writers, artists, and critics who would meet regularly at the Institute of Contemporary Arts. As Britain had come out of the Second World War (with rationing still in place until 1954), modernism as a design movement would be seen to "transcend individual differences in taste" and be "envisaged as a unifying force, helping to create a fairer, socially just world, and producing timeless objects unaffected by the vagaries of fashion."

Crosby attended many of the independent groups' meetings, and was impressed by the debate and discussion around mass communication, design, art and culture. At his own request to then-Whitechapel Gallery director Bryan Robertson, the exhibition would "discuss a modern urban art drawing on advertising, comic strips, movies, science fiction – an art that was to be named Pop Art by the critic Lawrence Alloway." It would bring together 38 people in 12 groups, who would produce a single piece of art. The same groups would also produce six pages that would form a catalogue designed by Edward Wright, and would design and print a poster to promote the show. Crosby would also design the poster for the 1956 exhibition, employing red, white, and black.

A contemporary review of the exhibition by Art News and Review said: "We must also praise without reservation the intention to extract from life, and to replunge into life, a new category of forms. That these forms will appear arbitrary to those who measure life with the yardsticks of kitchen sinks and espresso bars is only to be expected. Any attempt to rejuvenate the impact of new forms on our daily experiences is bound to be a struggle on the double front of conventional "realism" and equally conventional "modernism." The exhibition at the Whitechapel Art Gallery tries to fight this double battle."

Crosby worked in group one with designers Germano Facetti and Edward Wright, and sculptor William Turnbull, in what he referred to as his "first experience with a loose, horizontal organization of equals. We made it a kind of practical and efficient reality at Pentagram."

The firm was successful and grew in size; in the early 1970s, they discussed formalizing a new partnership together with one of their associate designers, Mervyn Kurlansky, and product designer Kenneth Grange.

=== Pentagram ===
In 1972, the by now five partners - Fletcher, Crosby, Forbes, Grange and Kurlansky - established a new business structure and changed the name of the Crosby/Fletcher/Forbes firm to Pentagram. The name was inspired by the number of establishing partners, which was the same as the number of points on a pentagram. In 1982, the partners moved from an office at the rear of the Paddington railway station to a new space on Needham Road in the Notting Hill area of West London. A former dairy, the space was designed by Crosby and remains as Pentagram's London office.

In her book Kenneth Grange: Designing The Modern World, Lucy Johnston explains that Pentagram was unique as Grange referred to it as "stepping into a brave new world." The firm was "open and democratic, considered an association of equals with each partner continuing to retain his own clients and run his own projects. The new factors were that administrative costs were pooled, each partner would receive the same income, and profits were shared, regardless of the value of projects that each partner brought in. By way of comparison, for similar income Grange’s projects had substantially longer timescales and were heavier on resources than other partners’ graphic design projects with shorter turnaround times. Regular partner meetings were held at which potential new clients and projects were discussed, and the benefit—or lack of—mutually agreed."

In his essay on Pentagram's formation, entitled "Transition", Forbes wrote that "During these early years, the one of us who worried first about cash flow, the need for more studio space or what might happen in five years, got the job of planning the progress of the firm permanently. That happened to be me. We were fundamentally a "round table" organization, but I was the one who led efforts to develop the shareholder agreements and the constitution with lawyers, to refine the financial reporting with the accountants, and to map out a five-year plan."

In the same essay, Forbes highlighted four attributes he looked for in selecting a new partner:

1. "A partner must be able to generate business. Other partners do not want to become salesmen. Help is available on a collaborative basis and the advantages include an expanded depth of work to draw from, the knowledge and expertise of other partners, and shared central support, but there should be no doubt as to where the ultimate responsibility lies.
2. A partner must have a national reputation as an outstanding professional in the chosen discipline. This is a subjective decision, but the partners have a sense of their standing in the field and the quality of work with which they wish to be associated. It is too easy to “water the wine.”
3. A partner must be able to control projects and contribute to the profits of the firm. There is considerable generosity about difference of earning because of different contributions in other areas. However, one cannot share income with a person who does not have similar potential and, probably more important, a similar attitude towards desired income. Nor can one share with a person who cannot manage a project or a team.
4. The last, and certainly not the least, is that a partner must be a pro-active member of the group and care about Pentagram and the partners. We spend our working lives together; we should like each other. "

=== Approach to business ===
In 1993, regarding Pentagram's decision to remain a private company, Pentagram partner John McConnell told Eye magazine: "Why give up control to a bunch of people who probably have no interest in design? Shareholders measure success in terms of financial dividends and corporate growth. Designers tend to look for improved quality of work. And as many design companies have demonstrated, growing by acquisition, by bolting on parts, can produce some uncontrollable monsters."

=== Catering ===
Unlike other design companies, Grange saw catering as an opportunity to attract new clients and, as part of the collective ethos, established shared mealtimes with a new cook each year, a set menu which was enjoyed by all staff.

In 1978, Forbes moved from London to the United States to form Pentagram's New York office, eventually adding graphic designers Peter Harrison and Woody Pirtle as partners. In 1990 and 1991, graphic designers Michael Bierut and Paula Scher and architect James Biber joined the New York office. They eventually moved to a building at 204 Fifth Avenue, a building designed by C. P. H. Gilbert, where the office resided until 2017. The New York office is now located in a building at 250 Park Avenue South.

== Scope and clientele ==
Pentagram is best known for its work in graphic design and corporate identity. As partners have joined and left, the firm has also worked in architecture, interiors, wayfinding and environmental design, packaging, product and industrial design and sound design.

Among others, they have developed or updated identities for Oppo, Citibank, Sam Labs, Saks Fifth Avenue, United Airlines, the Big Ten Conference, and The Co-operative brand. In addition to graphic design work, the firm has partners working on architectural projects such as the Harley-Davidson Museum, the Alexander McQueen shops, Citibank interiors, the Adshel and Clear Channel buildings in London, a host of private residences, the London club Matter, along with a range of other interior, retail, restaurant and exhibition projects. Pentagram were hired to redesign set and onscreen graphics of the American cable television programme The Daily Show in 2005. Pentagram were commissioned to design the packaging for the 2016 Pink Floyd box set The Early Years 1965–1972. In 2019, Pentagram were commissioned to rebrand the entirety of American film studio Warner Bros. Pictures. In 2022, Pentagram were commissioned to create a new logo for season 48 of Saturday Night Live.

Beyond work for commercial clients, Pentagram also works with cultural institutions and does pro bono work for non-profit organisations. On 12 February 2008, the President's Council on Service and Civic Participation awarded Pentagram the "DNA" award for incorporating pro bono services into their business culture. Recently, Pentagram has done work for the One Laptop per Child, the High Line, New York's Public Theater, and the National Gallery of Art.

== Partners ==
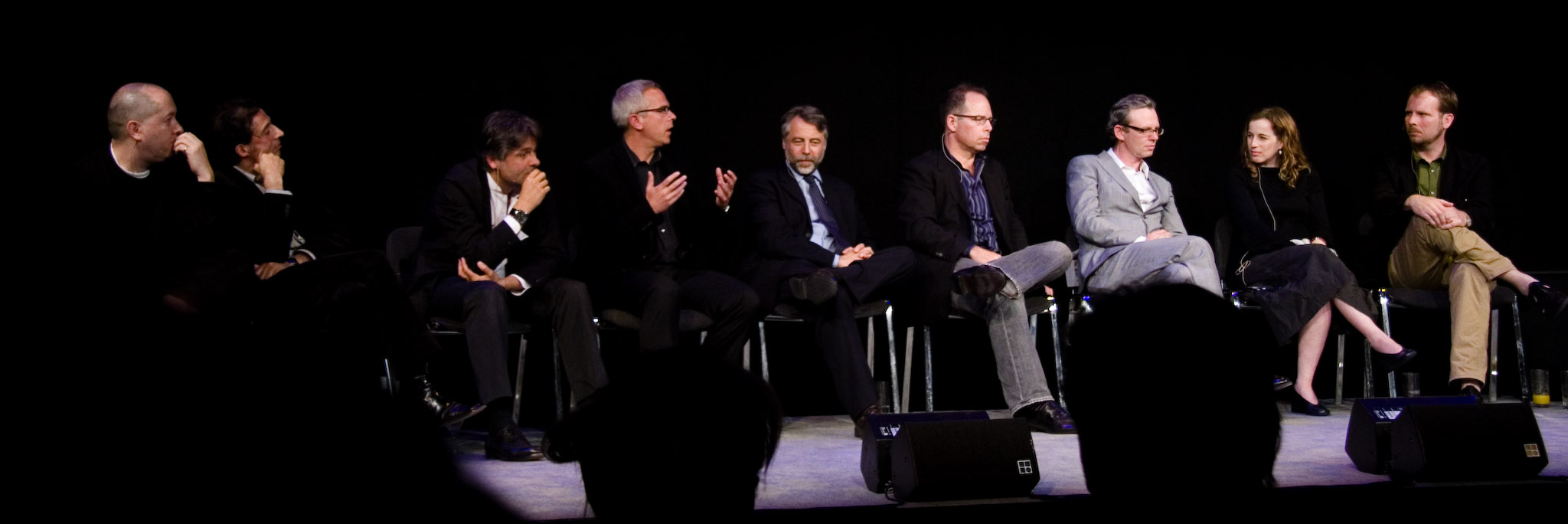
Pentagram partners at an event in London in 2007. Left to right: Domenic Lippa, Lorenzo Apicella, Justus Oehler, DJ Stout, Daniel Weil, Michael Bierut, William Russell, Lisa Strausfeld and Abbott Miller

Pentagram was founded on the premise of collaborative interdisciplinary partners working together in an independently owned firm of equals, both financially and creatively. Theo Crosby claimed the structure was suggested to him by his experience of working on the 1956 This Is Tomorrow exhibition: "it was my first experience at a loose, horizontal organisation of equals. We have brought it... to a kind of practical and efficient reality at Pentagram".

The firm comprises 24 partner-designers, each managing a team of designers and sharing in common overhead and staff resources. The partners in each office share incomes equally and all the partners own an equal portion of the total firm. This equality, along with the tradition of periodically inviting new members to join, renews the firm while giving even the newest members an equal footing with the partners of long standing. This "flat" organisation (there are no executive officers, CEO, CFO or board, other than the entire group of partners), along with the self-capitalised finances of the business, allows equal participation and control of the group's destiny by each member.

Eddie Opara became a partner in 2010. Born in London to Nigerian parents, Opara studied at the London College of Printing and Yale University. He writes about the importance of his cultural background in the afterword to the book The Black Experience in Design. His brand identity for Re used innovative typographic adaptation to echo the mission of the brand re―inc, the lifestyle brand co-founded by world champion US women's national soccer team members Tobin Heath, Christen Press, and Megan Rapinoe, and former member Meghan Klingenberg.

=== Partners ===
- Michael Bierut, New York
- Michael Gericke, New York
- Luke Hayman, New York
- Jody Hudson-Powell, London
- Angus Hyland, London
- Natasha Jen, New York
- Domenic Lippa, London
- Giorgia Lupi, New York
- Samar Maakaroun, London
- Jon Marshall, London
- Abbott Miller, New York
- Hugh Miller, London
- Emily Oberman, New York
- Justus Oehler, Berlin
- Eddie Opara, New York
- Harry Pearce, London
- Luke Powell, London
- John Rushworth, London
- Paula Scher, New York
- DJ Stout, Austin
- Andrea Trabucco-Campos, New York
- Marina Willer, London
- Matt Willey, New York
- Piotr Woronkowicz, New York

=== Past partners ===
- Theo Crosby (partner from 1972–1994)
- Alan Fletcher (partner from 1972–1991)
- Colin Forbes (partner from 1972–1993)
- Kenneth Grange (partner from 1972–1998)
- Mervyn Kurlansky (partner from 1972–1993)
- John McConnell (partner from 1974–2006)
- Ron Herron (partner from 1977–1981)
- Peter Harrison (partner from 1978–1996)
- David Hillman (partner from 1978–2007)
- David Pelham (partner from 1981–1986)
- Kit Hinrichs (partner from 1986–2010)
- Linda Hinrichs (partner from 1986–1991)
- Neil Shakery (partner from 1986–1994)
- Howard Brown (partner from 1987–1988)
- Etan Manasse (partner from 1987–1990)
- Woody Pirtle (partner from 1988–2005)
- Peter Saville (partner from 1990–1992)
- James Biber (partner from 1991–2010)
- Daniel Weil (partner from 1991–2020)
- David Pocknell (partner from 1991–1995)
- Lowell Williams (partner from 1994–2007)
- Robert Brunner (partner from 1996–2007)
- Lorenzo Apicella (partner from 1998–2017)
- April Greiman (partner from 2000–2001)
- Fernando Gutiérrez (partner from 2000–2006)
- Lisa Strausfield (partner from 2002–2011)
- William Russell (partner from 2005–2017)
- Astrid Stavro (partner from 2018–2021)
- Naresh Ramchandani (partner from 2010–2021)
- Sascha Lobe, London (partner from 2018–2024)
- Yuri Suzuki(partner from 2018–2024)
