= Willer =

Willer may refer to:

- Willer (surname)
- Willer (given name)
- Willer (footballer) (born 1979), Brazilian footballer
- Willer, Haut-Rhin, a commune in France
- Willer-sur-Thur, a commune in France
- Willer Group, transport company in Japan which owns Willer Express
