= Matt Willey =

British graphic designer (born 1974)

- Education: Central Saint Martins
- Occupation: Graphic designer
- Style: Graphic design

Matt Willey (born 1974) is a British graphic designer based in Brooklyn.

== Design career ==
Willey was educated at Central Saint Martins in London, graduating in 1997. He was art director at The New York Times Magazine from 2015 to 2020. In December 2019 Willey became a partner at design firm Pentagram in New York City.

=== Killing Eve title graphics ===
He designed the title graphics for British television series Killing Eve. His title graphics were nominated for a BAFTA Award and received a Royal Television Society Craft Award.
