= Anne Walsh Willer =

American politician

Member of the Illinois House of Representatives from the 6th district
- In office 1975–1981

Personal details
- Born: December 14, 1923 Chicago, Illinois, US
- Died: November 11, 2017 (aged 93) Portland, Oregon, US
- Resting place: Willamette National Cemetery
- Party: Democratic
- Spouse: Leonard Willer (m. 1945)
- Children: 5
- Education: DePaul University

Anne Walsh Willer (December 14, 1923 – November 11, 2017) was an American Democratic politician, active in Illinois from the 1940s until she moved to Oregon in 1986.

== Early life ==
Willer was born in Chicago, Illinois in 1923, the daughter of Leo Emmett Walsh and Stella (Catellier) Walsh. She grew up in Brookfield, Illinois and graduated from Trinity High School in River Forest, Illinois. Willer then went to the DePaul University Secretarial School. Willer worked as a secretary for a few years.

== Political career ==
Willer became active in the Maywood Human Relations Committee and the Proviso League of Women Voters. She served as a delegate in the Illinois Constitutional Convention of 1969–1970. Willer served on the Illinois Judicial Inquiry Board from 1971 to 1973. Willer served in the Illinois House of Representatives from 1975 to 1981 as a member of the Democratic Party, championing Equal Rights legislation. She represented the 6th District, including Hillside, Brookfield and La Grange. She was voted the “Best Legislator of the Year” in 1976 by the Independent Voters of Illinois.

== Marriage and children ==
She married Leonard Willer (1920–2010) in Laredo, Texas, where he had been stationed in the army, in 1945: the couple lived in Maywood, Illinois and later in Hillside, Illinois.

They had five children: daughters Noreen, Barbara and Peggy, and sons Chuck and Steve.

Anne and Leonard moved to Portland, Oregon in 1986. She died in a hospital in Portland, Oregon, after breaking her hip. She is buried with her husband in Willamette National Cemetery, Portland.
