= Daniel Weil =

Argentine architect and industrial designer

- Born: September 8, 1953 (age 73); Buenos Aires, Argentina
- Spouse: Sarah Fleminger (m. 1982)
- Children: 3

Daniel Weil (born September 8, 1953) is an Argentine-born British architect and industrial designer. He was a partner at the London office of design firm Pentagram between 1992–2020.

== Early life ==
Weil was born in Buenos Aires to parents Alfredo Weil and Mina Rosenbaum. His mother is of Italian descent and because of anti-Semitic laws by Mussolini, she immigrated to Buenos Aires along with her sister, who also married Alfredo's brother. Weil grew up with three brothers; the eldest Ruben; and two younger brothers Gabriel and Miguel. He is of German descent.

Weil studied architecture at the University of Buenos Aires, graduating in 1977. Following qualifying as an architect, Weil moved to London to attend the Royal College of Art, obtaining an MA in 1981. Weil was a unit master for the Architectural Association and a professor of Industrial Design at the Royal College of Art.

== Career ==
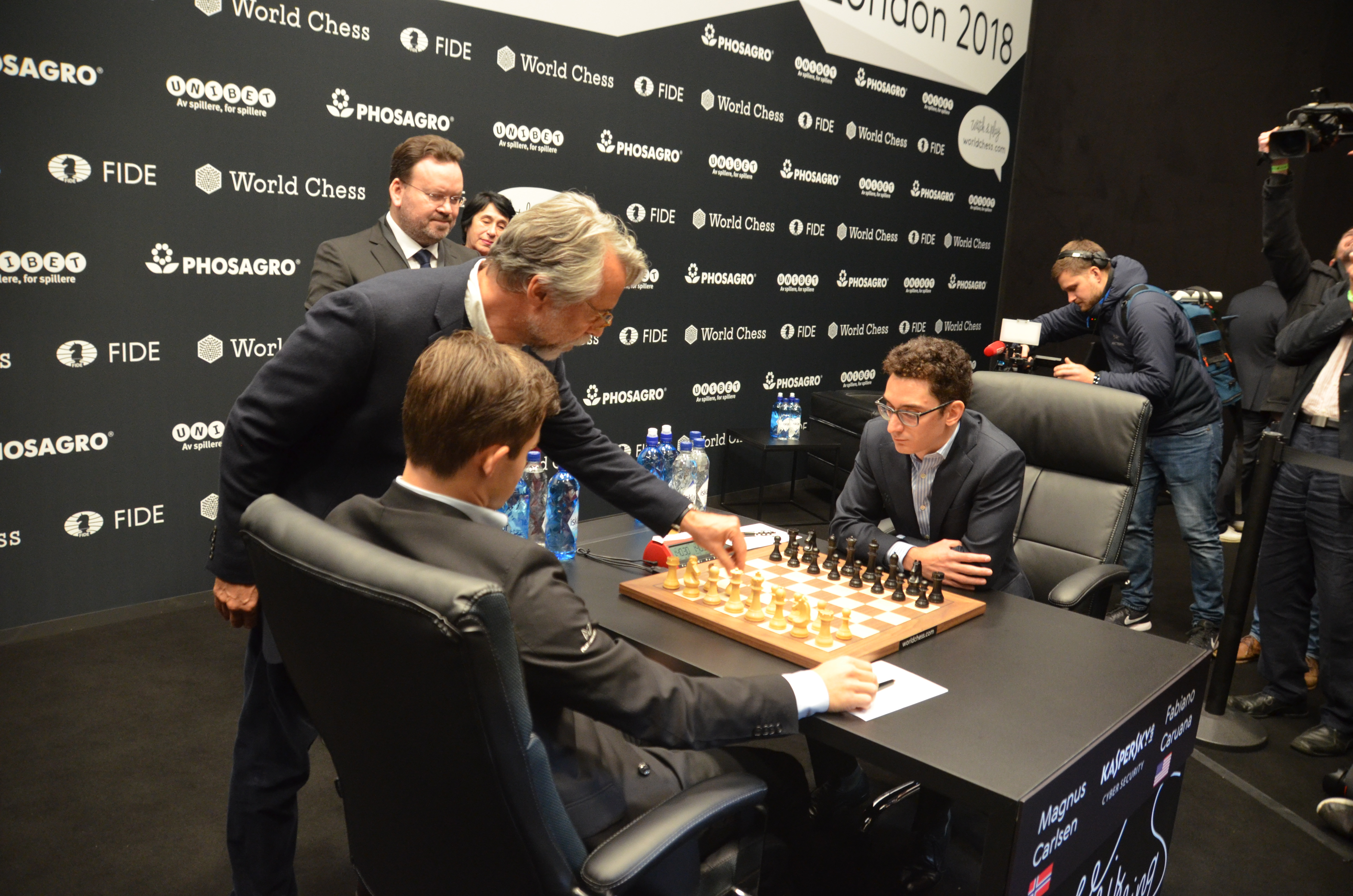
Daniel Weil performing the honor kick-off in the World Chess Championship 2018 between Magnus Carlsen and Fabiano Caruana.

Upon leaving the RCA, Weil started designing his own products. In 1981 Weil designed the Radio Bag, a radio taken apart and put into a transparent bag. The 1983 edition of the Radio Bag is part of the permanent collection in the MOMA and the V&A. In 1985 Weil co-authored the paperback Light Box, which was published by the Architectural Association

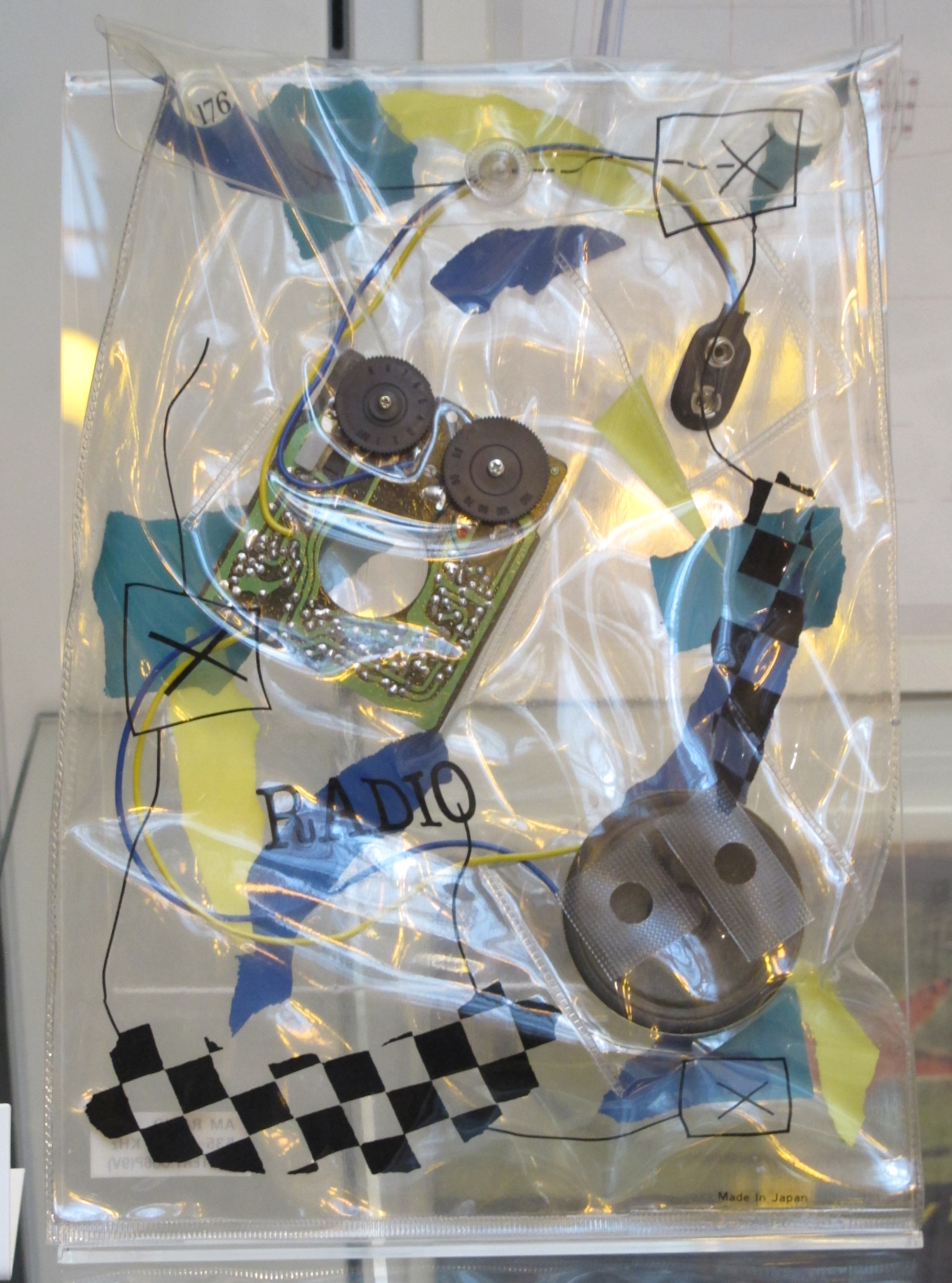
Weil's Radio Bag

Weil joined Pentagram's London office in 1992. He has worked extensively with the ALDO Group, designing three pop-up shops and retail spaces for the brand, including one for Madonna's Truth or Dare shoe range and two for ALDO rise. Weil's clients also include United Airlines, where he designed cabin interiors, tableware, seating, amenities, staff uniforms and the lounges for First, Business and Economy classes.

In 2002, the Royal College of Art awarded Weil a Senior Fellowship.

For London 2012 Olympic Games, Weil designed a self-contained exhibition, called the Chronoscope which showcases the development of the Lower Lea Valley and what the area will look life after the Games.

He has also worked with Grupo Assa and worked on the rebranding of World Chess. Former clients include Swatch, Mont Blanc, Lego, Coca-Cola, Boots and The Dorchester in London.

Weil left Pentagram in 2020 to pursue a variety of other projects and interests.

=== Clocks ===
For over 20 years Weil has been making clocks. In 2012, Sotheby's London exhibited "Making Time", including work from Weil's clock series made 17 years apart. His most recent collection, "A Matter of Time" consists of "Clock for an Architect", "Clock for an Acrobat", "Clock for an Astronomer", "Clock for a Card Player" and "Clock for a Filmmaker". In July 2012, his "Clock for a Filmmaker", the fifth and final clock in his series was unveiled at KATARA in Doha. In 2014, the Design Museum exhibited Weil's clocks and other work in the critically acclaimed show "Time Machines: Daniel Weil and the Art of Design".

== Personal life ==
Weil and resides in London. He married British solicitor Sarah Fleming on June 24, 1982. They have three children together.
