= Marina Willer =

Brazilian-born British graphic designer and filmmaker

- Occupations: Graphic designer, creative director, filmmaker
- Employer: Pentagram

Marina Willer RDI is a Brazilian-born graphic designer and filmmaker based in the United Kingdom. She is a partner at the London office of design firm Pentagram.

== Biography ==
Willer grew up in Brazil, and developed a passion for design, largely due to the influence of her artist parents. She went on to study graphic design at the Royal College of Art in London. After gaining her MA, she was approached by brand agency Wolff Olins. Despite being more interested in filmmaking at the time, she accepted their offer and worked with the agency for over a decade. The firm recognized her talent for design, and she gained the title of creative director. Following her work with Wolff Olins, she joined the Pentagram team as their first female partner. Her work continues to be grounded in experimentation and fluidity. In addition to her work with Wolff Olins and Pentagram, She has been a D&AD judge, an external examiner at the Royal College of Art and is a member of the Alliance Graphique Internationale. She was named one of Creative Review's Creative Leaders 2017 and was inducted into Design Week's Hall of Fame in 2018. In 2021 Marina was made a Royal Designer for Industry (RDI) by the Royal Society of Arts in London.

== Career ==
=== Graphic Design ===
Sight and Sound logo by Willer (2021)

During the course of her career, Willer has led the design of major identities schemes for Amnesty International, Tate, Southbank Centre, Serpentine Galleries, Nesta, Oxfam, Macmillan Cancer Support, Natural History Museum and Rogers Stirk Harbour + Partners. She led the rebrand of Battersea and designed Ferrari: Under the Skin and Stanley Kubrick: The Exhibition for the Design Museum as well as Mangasia: Wonderlands of Asian Comics for the Barbican Centre.

=== Film ===
Willer's first feature film, Red Trees, premiered at the 2017 Cannes Film Festival and was released worldwide by Netflix in 2018. Willer has made several films for British architect Richard Rogers, including Exposed – a film to introduce Rogers' exhibition at the Pompidou Centre – and Ethos, which was screened at the Royal Academy of Arts.
