= Colin Forbes (graphic designer) =

British graphic designer (1928–2022)

- Born: March 6, 1928; London, England
- Died: May 22, 2022 (aged 94); Westfield, North Carolina
- Occupation: Graphic designer

Colin Forbes (6 March 1928 – 22 May 2022) was a British graphic designer. He was notable as a head of the graphic design programme at the Central School of Arts and Crafts in London, and as one of the founders of the Pentagram design studio. He is best known for creating iconic logos and helping brands to develop visual identities.

== Biography ==
Colin Forbes was born in London in 1928 to John (a public relations manager for ICI) and Kathleen (nee Ames) Forbes. From 1945 to 1949, he was enlisted in the British Army and thought he would go into aircraft engineering after enlistment. Instead, he studied at the Central School of Arts and Crafts in London, taking advantage of a veteran grant program, and worked briefly under graphic designer and journalist Herbert Spencer. After graduating, Forbes returned to become Head of Graphic Design at the Central School at the age of 28.

By 1960 Forbes had left teaching for private practice and in 1962 formed Fletcher/Forbes/Gill with Alan Fletcher and Bob Gill. (Gill left the partnership in 1965 and was replaced by Theo Crosby and the firm became Crosby/Fletcher/Forbes). In 1972 Forbes and Fletcher were two of the five founders of Pentagram design studio, which would grow into a well known design studio, with locations in New York, Austin, San Francisco, and Berlin, in addition to London. In 1978 Forbes established a New York office for Pentagram.

Forbes also co-founded Design and Art Direction (D&AD), British educational organization that promotes excellence in design and advertising, and annually awards D&AD Pencils, one of the most prestigious industry awards.

With his partners at Fletcher/Forbes/Gill and later with partners at Pentagram, Forbes is the co-author of several books on design. He has also written under his sole name. Forbes was a 1991 recipient of the AIGA medal.

Forbes died at his home in Westfield, North Carolina on May 22, 2022, at the age of 94.

== Pentagram ==
Forbes was one of the five founders of the creative Pentagram studio. The structure of Pentagram can be mostly credited to Forbes, as he wanted partners to work both independently and collaboratively. Forbes also set out a guideline for selecting partners with four main criteria points: they must be able to generate business, must have a national reputation, have to generate a profit, and overall be a caring individual. When he expanded Pentagram to New York in 1978, he ensured these guidelines would continue to be met when selecting new partners and businesses.

== Books by Forbes ==
- Graphic Design: Visual Comparisons (with Alan Fletcher and Bob Gill), Reinhold Publishing, 1964.
- Pentagram: The Work of Five Designers (with Pentagram partners), Lund Humphries, 1972.
- Living by Design (with Pentagram partners), Lund Humphries, 1978.
- Seeing is Believing: Identity Design in the 20th Century, Booth-Clibborn Editions, 1995. (ISBN 978-1873968239)
- Better Documents: Pentagram's Guide to Choosing Typefaces and Creating Better Correspondence and Documents, Graphis Press, 2000. (ISBN 978-1888001945)
