= Map Project Office =

British industrial design firm

- Industry: Product Design, Industrial Design, Packaging design, Design strategy
- Founded: 2012
- Headquarters: Farringdon, London =, United Kingdom
- Key people: Richard Stevens
- Services: Strategy, Research, Design

Map Project Office is an industrial design studio based in Central London, working with both major brands and start-ups in the consumer technology space. The studio works with abstract technologies in the artificial intelligence, augmented reality and the IoT sectors, creating accessible experiences for the end user.

== History ==
Map was originally formed as a team within furniture design studio Barber & Osgerby to accommodate its growing portfolio of design work for major technology brands including Google, IBM and Sony. Founded by Edward Barber and Jay Osgerby, it was spun off into its own business in 2012, and has since received over 40 awards including Creative Review’s Creative Agency of the Year 2016. In 2018 Map Project Office and its sister company Universal Design Studio became part of WPP and work in partnership with AKQA.

== Work and awards ==
Map originally started with four people and has since grown to a team of 12 designers. Their three main strands of work are designed for start-ups, global technology brands and, increasingly, exhibition and installation development for leading creative and advertising agencies.

For their work with start-up clients, the studio works in an end-to-end design process, from strategy, design and fundraising to production, sourcing and manufacturing and often across disciplines including engineering, science, digital and business.

One of Map's first projects was with Kano to create a DIY computer kit that promotes STEAM and STEM learning for children. The kit originally launched on Kickstarter and has gone on to receive multiple awards. Further work with startups include BleepBleeps and the Beeline Smart Compass, which was awarded Best Consumer Product by Design Week in 2017.

The studio also works with technology brands conducting concept work, and working with the client's in-house design teams to develop strategic products that will shape the future of technology. In many cases where the final output will end up being released 4 or 5 years later.

Working on collaborative exhibition and spatial design projects Map received awards for the Google Chrome Web Lab, the Science Museum Entrance Desk and IBM Watson IoT Headquarters in Munich.

In 2016, the studio was the recipient of the acclaimed Creative Agency of the Year by Creative Review and was also listed by Fast Co as one of the Top 10 Most Innovative Companies in Design.

For collaborations with Honda, BleepBleeps and Beeline they were also featured extensively in Icon Magazine, FastCoDesign, The Drive, Wired and Dezeen.

The studio was highlighted within The Design Economy as a case study. The report released by the Design Council addressed the skills and economic contribution the industry provides to the UK.

Map Project Office collaborated with Universal Design Studio to design the world's first integrated quantum computing system for IBM. In 2019 IBM launched the IBM Q System One at the Consumer Electronics Show in Las Vegas. Map and Universal defined the vision for the system, where the hardware, spaces and interface were considered as a single coherent experience.
