= Sam Haskins =

British photographer (1926–2009)

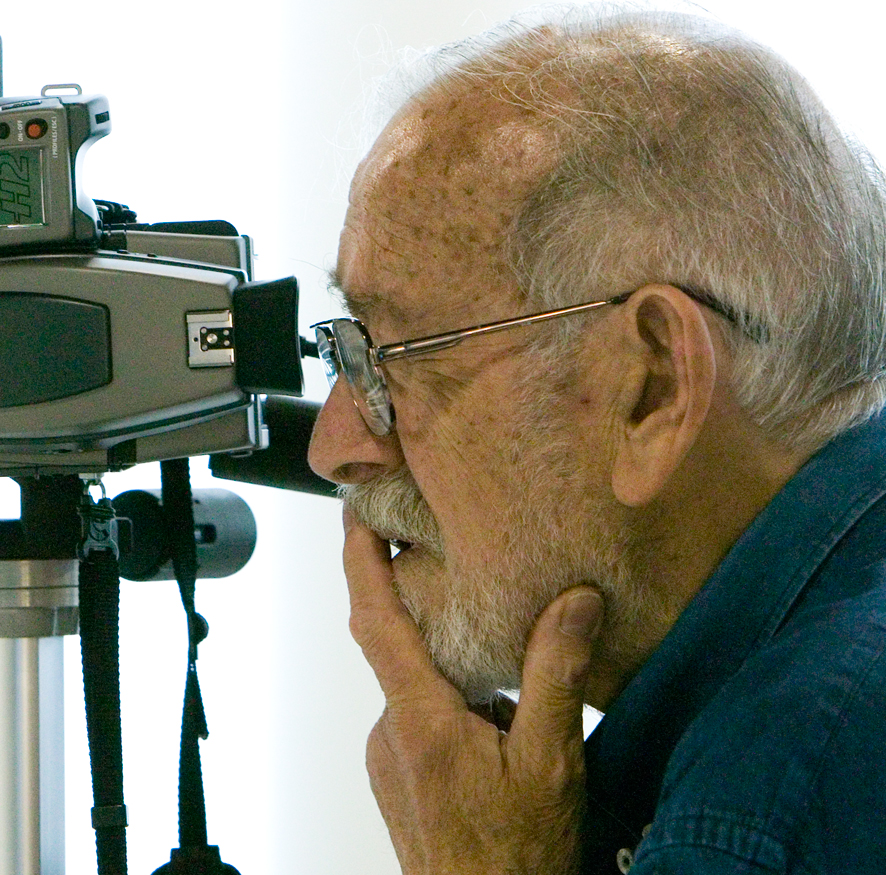
- Haskins in 2006
- Born: 11 November 1929; Kroonstad, South Africa
- Died: 26 November 2009 (aged 83); Bowral, Australia
- Education: London College of Communication, London
- Occupations: photographer, photo-graphic illustrator.
- Spouse: Alida Haskins
- Children: Ludwig Haskins, Konrad Haskins, Heidi Haskins
- Awards: Prix Nadar in 1964; International Art Book Competition, Israel in 1969; One Show Gold Medal, NY in 1974; Biennale des Arts Graphiques, Silver Medal in 1978; Kodak book of the Year in 1980

Samuel Joseph Haskins (11 November 1926 – 26 November 2009), was a British photographer, born and raised in South Africa. He started his career in Johannesburg and moved to London in 1968. Haskins is best known for his contribution to in-camera image montage, Haskins Posters (1973) and the 1960s figure photography trilogy Five Girls (book) (1962), Cowboy Kate & Other Stories (1964) and November Girl (book) (1967), plus an ode to sub-saharan tribal Africa African Image (book) (1967).

He suffered a stroke on 19 September 2009 the opening day of his exhibition to launch Fashion Etcetera at Milk Gallery in New York, and died at home in Bowral, Australia, nine weeks later.

== Youth ==
Haskins was born in Kroonstad in the province of the Orange Free State of South Africa. His father Ben was a goods inspector on South African Railways. Early creative influences were fueled by an interest in magic tricks, kite making, drawing and the circus. A talented athlete, as a teenager he excelled at hurdling and trained with a circus, resulting in a job offer as a trapeze catcher.

== Education ==
Haskins' formal higher education was at the Johannesburg Technical College 1945–1948, where he did a general arts course followed by a part-time photographic module. Between 1949 and 1951, he studied at the London School of Printing and Graphic Arts in Bolt Court, later renamed the London College of Printing, and now the London College of Communication.

== Marriage and children ==
Haskins married Alida Elzabe van Heerden in 1952 and they had two sons; Ludwig (4 August 1955) and Konrad (27 January 1963). They adopted a daughter, Heidi in 1960, but she died in infancy. Alida gave up a career in fashion soon after their marriage to become Haskins' business partner. She played a key role in the launch of his career by acting as a publishing agent for Five Girls when he was still an unknown photographer. She continued to negotiate worldwide publication of his books, apart from Fashion Etcetera, his last project, a book and exhibition in New York, managed by Ludwig. Alida died on 5 December 2012. Haskins' artistic estate is now owned and managed by his son Ludwig. Konrad Haskins, Ludwig's younger brother and only sibling died on 23 March 2014.

== Career summary ==
Haskins started his career as an advertising photographer in Johannesburg in 1953. He ran what was probably the first modern freelance advertising studio in Africa. He produced commercial work across a very broad spectrum of photography from still life to industrial, fashion and aerial. His first formal creative output was a one-man show at the popular Johannesburg department store John Orrs in 1960. This featured black-and-white photography of models in the studio and included some photographs of dolls made by the young Elisabeth Langsch, who went on to become Switzerland's leading ceramist.

His international reputation and his signature photographic passions were established by four key books published in the 1960s. Five Girls (1962) explored a fresh approach to photographing the nude female figure and contained important first explorations with black-and-white printing, cropping and book design, which were a key feature of his subsequent books. Alexey Brodovitch's Ballet of 1945 had pioneered the expressive exaggeration of grain through radical enlargement, 'pushed' film development and treatment with ferricyanide, and through his teaching of her influenced Diane Arbus' gritty early 35mm work of the 1950s, Cowboy Kate & Other Stories (1964) further popularised black-and-white photographic grain in image design. It was highly influential at the time, sold roughly a million copies worldwide and won the Prix Nadar in France in 1964. It continues to influence contemporary photographers, film makers, fashion designers and make-up artists. Cowboy Kate & Other Stories or 'Kate' as the book is often referred to, had its place in photographic history cemented in 2005 when the International Center of Photography in New York included the book in their exhibition The Open Book: A History of the Photographic Book from 1878 to the Present.

November Girl (1967) contained key image collages which formed the basis of many graphic and surrealist experiments in the 1970s and 1980s. African Image (1967) was a visual homage to the indigenous people, culture, landscape and wildlife of sub-Saharan Africa. The images represent a lifelong interest in photographing graphically stimulating environments and formally document his passion for indigenous craft. He broke bones on river rapids and wrote off two Volvo saloon cars on African dirt roads while shooting the book. Despite its international award, this meticulously constructed book, celebrating a love for sub-Saharan Africa, is probably the least known of his major creative projects, but it is coveted by serious collectors of African art and photography.

In 1968, Haskins moved to London and ran a studio in Glebe Place just off the King's Road. He worked as an advertising photographer for international consumer brands Asahi Pentax, Bacardi, Cutty Sark whisky, Honda, BMW, Haig whisky, DeBeers, British Airways, Unilever and Zanders, and specialised in the art direction and shooting of calendars, especially for Asahi Pentax in Japan. Although he endorsed Hasselblad for a short period in the late 1960s and early 1970s, his loyalty to the medium format 6x7 camera and lenses from Asahi resulted in a rare long-term association between a camera manufacturer and photographer. From 1970 to 2000, Asahi Optical (later Pentax) produced 30 calendars, of which Haskins shot and art-directed 15 editions including the millennium calendar. No other photographer was invited to contribute more than once. He was involved with the Pentax Forum Gallery in Tokyo, which hosted his exhibitions. His first contact came in 1967, when Asahi Optical presented him with a 35 mm camera after hearing that he had shot African Image with various competitors' products.

In 1972, he produced his first colour book, Haskins Posters. The large-format publication contained pages printed on one side using a thick stiff paper and a soft glue perfect binding allowing the pages to be removed and used as posters. Haskins and Alida successfully published the book internationally through their own company, Haskins Press. The book won a gold award at the New York One Show. At the time the best-known image from Haskins Posters, a girl's face superimposed on an apple with a bee near the stem, appeared on the cover or in editorials of almost every major photographic magazine around the world. This image was part of a well-publicised visual and graphic experimentation with the apple theme in the 1970s that for a while resulted in photographic journalists nicknaming him 'Sam the Apple man'.

The images in Haskins Posters traversed different creative themes that all became signature passions for Haskins' image-making over the next three decades; graphically strong compositions of nudes characterised by a natural essence in the models, while the image-making explored themes of graphic experimentation, humour and sensual eroticism. Haskins had a recurring theme (rooted in his training as a painter) of creating tension in the surface of his photographs between flat graphic elements and 3D chiaroscuro. Those results were often achieved with sophisticated lighting and/or double exposures. A highly creative and design driven approach to lighting almost always played a key role in Haskins' work, both in the studio and on location. He often developed complex lighting designs for a single specific shot that were never repeated, a late example being a fashion shoot for New York magazine's 75th anniversary issue shot in New York's Pier 57 studios in August 2006.

Haskins also often sculpted and painted graphic elements for his photographs and drew inspiration from a combination of surrealism, illustration, film and modern graphic designers.

The graphic experiments first seen in Haskins Posters and related exhibitions at London's Photographer's Gallery and National Theatre, resulted in a book called Photo Graphics (1980). The title of the book coined a new term in photography that has since become widely used.

Haskins' next book, Sam Haskins á Bologna (1984), resulted from an invitation by the mayor of Bologna to photograph the city. The publication was accompanied by an exhibition in the city. This project led to two more homages to visually rich locations shot over a series of visits; Barcelona (1991) and Kashmir (between 1992 and 1994).

From 2000 to 2005, he focused on fashion photography for Vogue, Harper's Bazaar, Allure and New York. A shortage of copies of the original edition of Cowboy Kate & Other Stories (1964), which was selling to collectors for up to US$3,000, led Haskins to bring out a digitally remastered 'director's cut' version in October 2006, published by Rizzoli in New York. Apart from image editing and layout revisions, the new version had 16 pages of new images.

In 2002, Haskins and Alida moved to the Southern Highlands of New South Wales, Australia, and built the third house-studio of their partnership. The move away from London resulted in a renaissance in Haskins' fashion photography. While he had always had a passion for fashion from the start of his career, and Cowboy Kate influenced fashion designers, who credited Haskins, he had not been courted by the mainstream fashion world and did not court them. A shoot for Yves Saint Laurent in Paris in 2002 resulted in a 'rediscovery' that led to a stream of assignments in London, New York, Paris, Tokyo and Sydney, working for fashion houses and magazines.

In December 2006, a month after his 80th birthday, the first retrospective exhibition of his work (with a portraiture bias) opened at the National Portrait Gallery in Canberra (Australia). That was also his first exhibition at a national museum/gallery. The show ran for four and a half months to 22 April 2007.

The exhibition contained several portraits of other artists never seen before, including one of the late Jean-Michel Folon, a graphic artist much admired by Haskins. Although one or two of the images from that personal portrait project had previously been published, the majority remained part of a quiet collection built up over decades of meeting and befriending other artists.

In 2009, Haskins published, under the family imprint The Haskins Press, his first book in 24 years. Fashion Etcetera is a thematic slice through his archive that explores a lifelong passion for fashion, style and design. The book was produced over three years working in close collaboration with his son Ludwig and his grandson Oren, and is dedicated to Ludwig and Oren. In 2009, the last year of Haskins' life, his "Fashion Etcetera" book and exhibition received widespread global publicity, and in the process, turned images of Gill from 'Five Girls' (1962) into one of the new-found icons of the 1960s. Following the death of Haskins' wife, Alida Haskins, on 5 December 2012, the Haskins estate is now 100% owned and managed by Ludwig, who continues to publish and exhibit his father's work and negotiate image rights.

== Slide show ==
Haskins developed a medium format slide show comprising up to 500 images, each displayed for seven seconds, synchronised to music. They were shown with a traditional manual projector operated by Haskins using a darkroom timer. First shown in Brighton at an international photo conference in 1970, the show was hugely popular, filling theatres, cinemas and convention halls at photo conferences and public performances in over 50 cities around the world.

The initial format of the slides was 6cmx6cm, because all Haskins' medium format images at that point had been shot using Hasselblad and Rolleiflex cameras. Haskins took delivery of his first Pentax 6x7 in 1970 in Tokyo but it took several years to build up a body of 6x7 slides. The conversion of the slides to 6x7 format took place in 1975 and it was at that point that the show gained a much higher profile internationally.

== Teaching and assessing ==
Haskins ran one-week photographic training workshops in Italy, Sweden and South Africa in the 1970s. He returned to his alma mater, The London College of Printing, in 1975 as outside assessor on the photographic diploma course, a position he maintained until 1982.

Between 1980 and 1985, he ran one-week workshops for writers, cinematographers, directors and set designers at Norwegian Television's training school in Oslo.

The rest of his teaching was usually at one-day workshops at photo conferences and to groups visiting his studio. Haskins maintained close links with Syracuse University in the US, hosting groups of visiting students at his studio in London every summer from 1975 to 1988.

== Bibliography ==
=== Books by Haskins ===
Five Girls	
Concept, Photography & Design	Haskins
Format	144 p, 350x270mm, Cased, Offset
Library of Congress catalogue No.	62-20049
Introduction by	Aaron Sussman
Hardcover published 1962
Crown Publishing Inc.	New York
Bodley Head	London
Europäische Bücherei Hieronimi	Bonn
Paperback
Bantam Books	New York
Corgi	London

Cowboy Kate	
Concept, Photography & Design	Haskins
Format	160p, 350x270mm, Cased, Gravure
Library of Congress catalogue No.	67-112870
Introduction by	Norman Hall
Text by	Desmond Skirrow
Hardcover published 1964
Crown Publishing Inc.	New York
Bodley Head	London
Edition Prisma	Paris
Europäische Bücherei Hiernonimi	Bonn
Besige Bij	Amsterdam
Paperback
Bantam Books	New York
Corgi	London
Europäische Bücherei	Bonn
Signed Limited Edition 1975
Haskins Press	London

November Girl
Concept, Photography & Design	Haskins
Format	129 p, 350x270mm, Cased, Gravure
Library of Congress catalogue No.	71-385000
Text by	Desmond Skirrow
Hardcover published 1967
Grosset & Dunlap	New York
The Bodley Head	London
Edition Prisma	Paris
Europäische Bücherei Hiernonimi	Bonn
Paperback
Bantam Books	New York
Corgi	London

African Image	
Concept, Photography & Design	Haskins
Format	160p, 350x270mm, Cased, Gravure
Library of Congress catalogue No.	67-105792
Foreword by	L. Fritz Gruber
Hardcover published 1967
Thomas Crowell	New York
Bodley Head	London

Haskins Posters	
Concept, Photography & Design	Haskins
Format	32 p, 480x350mm, Soft Cover, removable pages
Library of Congress catalogue No.	73-176000
Foreword by	Haskins
Softback (main edition) published 1972
Haskins Press	London
Thomas Crowell	New York
Fitzhenry	Toronto
Westside Ltd	Toronto
KKK	Tokyo
Europäische Bücherei Hiernonimi	Bonn
Limited edition hardback published 1972

Photo Graphics	
Concept, Photography & Design	Haskins
Format	100 p, 310x245mm, Cased, Offset
Library of Congress catalogue No.	82-126090
Hardcover published 1980
Rotovision S.A.	London
Rotovision S.A.	Geneva
Colucci Edizione	Milan
Nippon Geijutsu Shp.	Tokyo

Sam Haskins a Bologna	
Concept, Photography & Design	Haskins
Format	88p, 280x240mm, Soft Cover, Offset
Library of Congress catalogue No.	(no number available)
Introduction by	Profs. Carlo Gentile & Renzo Renzi
Hardcover published 1984
Graphis Edizione	Bologna

Cowboy Kate (Director's Cut)*	
Concept, Photography & Design	Haskins
Format	194p, 350x270mm, Cased, Offset
Library of Congress catalogue No.	2006923016
Foreword by	Philippe Garner
Introduction by	Norman Hall
Text by	Desmond Skirrow
Hardcover published 2006
Rizzoli	New York

- 'Cowboy Kate and other stories — Director's Cut' published in 2006 is entirely digitally remastered by the author with edits to the original story and 16 additional pages of images.

Printed in offset litho as opposed to the original which was photo gravure printed in Switzerland.

Fashion Etcetera by Haskins	Author's Edition
Concept, Photography & Design	Haskins
Format	316p, 359x271mm, Cased, Offset
Library of Congress catalogue No.	2009924427
Foreword by	Tommy Hilfiger
Introduction by	Michael Arts
7 Chapter Introductions by	Haskins
Haskins Biography by	Ludwig Haskins
Hardcover published 2009
The Haskins Press	Bowral, Australia

Fashion Etcetera by Haskins	Special Edition
Concept, Photography & Design	Haskins
Format	316p, 359x271mm, Cased, Offset
Library of Congress catalogue No.	Not Applicable -
Sold Exclusively in	Tommy Hilfiger stores
Foreword by	Tommy Hilfiger
Introduction by	Michael Arts
7 Chapter Introductions by	Haskins
Haskins Biography by	Ludwig Haskins
Hardcover published 2009
Tommy Hilfiger	New York

- The two editions of Fashion Etcetera are technically identical apart from the covers.

=== Books with images by Haskins ===
Year	City	Title	Editor/Author
1964	Tokyo	Photography of the World	Heibonsha Ltd
1966	Cape Town	Silver Images	Dr A Bensusan
1966	London	British Journal of Photography Annual	Arthur James Dalladay
1966, 1968, 1971–1975, 1977–1982, 1984	Zurich	Photographis	Walter Herdeg
1968	London	British Journal of Photography Annual	Arthur James Dalladay
1970	Geneva	Art Director's Index to Photographers_{1}	Rotovision
1970, 1971, 1973, 1975, 1977	Tokyo	Pentax Forum	Pentax
1970	Munich	4 Meister der erotischen Fotografie	photokina 1970
1970	Cologne	Photokina Bilder und Texte	photokina 1970
1971	London/New York	Views on Nudes	Bill Jay
1972	London	The Century - 100 Years of Posters	Bevis Hillier
1974	Zurich	Graphis Inc. Posters	Walter Herdeg
1974	New York	The One Show	New York Art Director's Club
1974	Zurich	Graphis Inc.	Walter Herdeg
1975	Fribourg	Friburg International Trienalle	Friburg Museum of Art
1976	London	Graphis Glamour Calendar Art	Michael Colmer
1977	London	Photography 35mm Camera	R H Mason
1977	Tokyo	Asahi Pentax Annual	Pentax
1977	Cologne	Geschichte der Fotografie im 20 Jh.	Peter Tausk
1977	London	Masterpieces of Erotic Photography	Aurum Press
1978	Fribourg	Friburg International Triennale	Friburg Museum of Art
1978	Brno	Brno Biennale '78	8th Graphic Art
1978	Cologne	Dumont Foto 1 (Fotokunst und Fotodesign international)	Fotokunst Int.
1978	London	The Visual Dictionary of Sex	Macmillan
1978	London	Modern Publicity 47	Felix Gluck
1979	London	Modern Publicity 48	Felix Gluck
1979	London	The Erotic Arts	Peter Webb
1980	Zurich	Graphis Inc., Photographics	William B McDonald
1981	Milan	Women in the Magic Mirror	Bert Hartkamp
1982	London/New York	The Dictionary of Visual Language	Philip Thompson & Peter Davenport
1983	Cambridge	The Autograph Book	
1984	Hamburg	Die Schönen Geschöpfe - Tierfotos	Stern Bibliothek
1984	Hamburg	Der Erotische Augenblick	Stern Bibliothek
1985	Munich	Das Aktfoto	Munich Stadtmuseum
1985	London	Photographers Encyclopedia International 1893 to the Present	Michele Auer & Michel Auer
1986	Schaffhausen	Ansichten vom Körper	Michael Kohler
1987	London	The Naked and the Nude	Jorge Lewinsky
1987 to 1997 inclusive	Tokyo	Pentax Annual	Pentax
1989	Rochester, New York	Professional Photographic Illustration	LoSapio
1990	New York	Angels - An Endangered Species	Malcolm Godwin
1990	North Abbot	The Tree	Peter Wood
1995	Munich	Twen, Revision einer Legende	Michael Koetzle
1995	London	Contemporary Photographers 3rd Edition	Martin Evans
1997	Paris	Love in the 20th Century	F. Montreynaud
1997	Munich	Willy Fleckhaus	Michael Koetzle & Carsten M Wolf
2000	New York	Cross	Kelly Klein
2000	U.S.	Emerging Bodies / Polaroid	Barbara Hitchcock
2004	Piermont, New Hampshire	Mary McFadden, High Priestess of High Fashion, A Life in Haute Couture	Mary McFadden & Ruta Saliklis
2004	Paris	Belles en Vogue	Florence Müller
2006	Paris	Nus : Les plus grands photographes du monde	Anthony LaSala
2007	London	Nudes : The World's Top Photographers series	Anthony LaSala
2007	Paris	Livres de nus	Alessandro Bertolotti
2008	Sydney	10 Years of Fashion Photography	Harper's Bazaar
2008	New York	Horse	Rizzoli
2008	Milan	photo20esimo (maestri della fotografia del XX secolo exhibition)	Silvana Editoriale
2009	Munich	Nude Visions (Münchner Stadtmuseum exhibition)	Kehrer Verlag
2010	Buriton	25 Years of colouring in (Paul Martin Design Company)	Grantchester Editions
2012	New York	Mary McFadden by Mary McFadden	RCS MediaGroup (under Rizzoli imprint)
2012	Cologne	The New Erotic Photography 2 by Dian Hanson	Taschen

(1) The Art Director's Index is a paid entry publication but on this occasion the publishers requested editorial material from Sam.

=== Haskins - Art history and criticism ===
Year	City	Book Title	Author	Publisher
1976	Paris	La Photo	Chenz & Jeanloup Sieff	Denoël
1980	London	Photography in the 20th Century	Petr Tausk	Focal Press
1983	London	How Famous Photographers Work	Jack Schofield	Watson-Guptil
1985	Prague	Creative Colour Photography	Petr Tausk	Focal Press
1986	Frankfurt	Modern Colour Photography '36-'86		
1987	London	Masters of Photography	D. Mrazkova	Hamlyn
1996	New York	Art Fundamentals - Theory & Practice	Otto Ocvirk	McGraw Hill
1997	Oxford	The Story of Photography	Michael Langford	Focal Press
1998	Munich	Nude Photography - masterpieces from the past 150 years	Peter-Cornel Richter	Prestel
2001	New York	Masters of the 20th Century_{(1)}	Mervyn Kurlansky	Graphis Inc.
2004	Gothenburg	The Open Book - A history of the photographic book from 1878	Andrew Roth	Hasselblad Center
2005	Switzerland	The World's Top Photographers - Nudes	Anthony la Sala	Rotovision

(1) Masters of the 20th Century is a book featuring graphic designers and typographers with the work of only two photographers, viewed in this context as photographic illustrators; Haskins and Rankin Waddell.

== Awards ==
Year	City	Award	Presented for;	Award Organisation
1964	Paris	Prix Nadar	Cowboy Kate and other stories	Prix Nadar
1969	Jerusalem	Silver Medal	African Image	International Art Book Competition
1974	New York	Gold Award	Haskins Posters	The One Show
1980	New York	Book of the Year	Photo Graphics	Kodak

== Solo exhibitions ==
Year	City	Exhibition	Location
1960	Johannesburg	Photographic Illustration	Orrco Theatre
1970	Tokyo	Sam Haskins	Pentax Gallery
1970	Tokyo	Sam Haskins '70	Isetan Gallery
1972	London	Haskins Posters	Photogephers Gallery
1973	Paris	Haskins Posters	FNAC Gallery
1973	Tokyo	Haskins Posters	Isetan Gallery
1974	Amsterdam	Haskins Posters	Canon Gallery
1974	London	Pentax Calendar 1975	Pentax Gallery
1976	Tokyo	Scandinavian Landscapes	Isetan Gallery
1976	London	Calendar 1977	Pentax Gallery
1979	London	New Work	Pentax Gallery
1980	London	Photo Graphics	National Theatre
1980	London	Photo Graphics	Kodak Gallery
1980	Norwich	Photo Graphics	Sainsbury Centre
1980	Bath	Photo Graphics	RPS Gallery
1981	Glasgow	Photo Graphics	Hillhead Gallery
1981	Rotterdam	Photo Graphics	Pentax Gallery
1981	Zurich	Photo Graphics	Pentax Gallery
1981	Tokyo	Photo Graphics	Pentax Forum
1981	New York	Photo Graphics	Neikrug Gallery
1984	Bologna	Sam Haskins a Bologna	Galleria d'Accursio
1985	Tokyo	The Best of Sam Haskins	Pentax Forum
1986	Osaka	The Best of Sam Haskins	Printemps
1987	London	Graphic Work	Saatchi & Saatchi
1987	Tokyo	Calendar 1988	Pentax Forum
1990	Tokyo	The Image Factor	Pentax Forum
1990	Osaka	The Image Factor	Pentax Forum
1991	Auckland	The Image Factor	Conference Centre
1991	Sydney	The Image Factor	Conference Centre
1991	Hong Kong	The Image Factor	Conference Centre
1992	Tokyo	Remember Barcelona	Pentax Forum
1992	Osaka	Remember Barcelona	Pentax Gallery
1992	Glasgow	Now & Then	MNS Photocolor
1993	Tokyo	Hearts	Pentax Forum
1993	Osaka	Hearts	Pentax Gallery
1996	Tokyo	Sam Haskins - Monochrome	Pentax Forum
1996	Osaka	Sam Haskins - Monochrome	Pentax Gallery
1999	London	Innovations & other stories	Focus Gallery
2000	Berlin	Image²	Gallery Argus Fotokunst
2003	New York	Sam Haskins	Michael Gallagher Gallery
2004	Paris	Sam Haskins	Marlat
2004	Amsterdam	Sam Haskins	Gallery Wouter van Leeuwen
2006-2007 (8 December - 22 April)	Canberra	Sam Haskins - Portraits & Other stories	National Portrait Gallery
2009 (19 September - 26 October)	New York	Sam Haskins - Fashion Etcetera	Milk Gallery
2010 (9 July - 21 August)	Paris	Sam Haskins - Calendars & other stories	Ofr. Bookshop & Gallery
2019 (19 September - 16 November)	London	Cowboy Kate & Other Stories	Atlas Gallery

== Group exhibitions ==
Year	City	Exhibition	Gallery
2005	New York	The Open Book: A History of the Photographic Book from 1878 to the Present	International Center of Photography
2007	London	Fashion	Michael Hoppen Gallery
2008	Lugano	maestri della fotografia del XX secolo	Museo d’Arte
2017	New York	Haskins, Giacobetti, Shinoyama: Three Masters of Erotic Photography	Steven Kasher Gallery
2020	Geneva	Sieff + Haskins	Grob Gallery

== Works in public collections ==
- Victoria and Albert Museum, London
- National Portrait Gallery, London
- National Portrait Gallery, Canberra
- City of Bologna, Italy
- Munich City Museum, Germany
- Museum of Art, Lugano, Switzerland

== Documentaries ==
Year	City	Title	Production company
1973	London	Sam Haskins	William Webb
1987	Locarno	Grandii Fotografi	Polyvideo SA
1990	London	Sam Haskins - Pentax 67	Luke Jeans
2002	London	Oral History of British Photography	British Library Sound Archive
