= Graphis Inc. =

International awards and publishing company in the United States

- Traded as: Graphis
- Founded: 1944
- Founder: Walter Herdeg and Walter Amstutz
- Country of origin: United States
- Headquarters location: New York City
- Distribution: Innovative Logistics
- Key people: Bjarne Martin Pedersen
- Publication types: Books
- Nonfiction topics: Competition, design competition, publishing, graphic design, advertising, photography, poster design, branding, typeface design, logo design, illustration, packaging
- Owner: Bjarne Martin Pedersen
- Official website: graphis.com

Graphis Inc. is an international publisher of books and awards for the visual communications industry. Based in New York City.

Graphis Magazine ended at issue No. 355, and a new Graphis Journal magazine, starting with Issue No. 356, was introduced in 2018.

== History ==
Graphis was founded in 1944 by Walter Herdeg and Dr. Walter Amstutz in Zurich, Switzerland. The magazine was started with the September/October 1944 issue. It was published six times a year and contained text in French, German, and English.

In 1986, B. Martin Pedersen purchased the company from Mr. Herdeg and later moved the headquarters to New York City. The Annuals were redefined, and new books were added to the roster, including New Talent (student work), Typography, Branding, Logo & Letterhead, among others.

== Graphis Masters ==
Design

- Anderson, Charles Spencer
- ARSONAL
- Bankov, Peter
- Bass, Saul
- Bundi, Stephan
- Castelletti, Andrea
- Chung, Hoon-Dong
- Cold Open
- Collins, Brian
- Colrat, Pascal
- Cronan, Michael
- Cross, James A.
- Cummings & Good
- Danne, Richard
- Fraile, Eduardo del
- Doret, Michael
- Duffy, Joe
- Emery, Garry
- Fili, Louise
- Fleckhaus, Willy
- Fletcher, Alan
- Frost, Vince
- Gee, Earl
- Gericke, Michael
- Glaser, Milton
- Gottschalk+Ash Int'l
- Gran, Martin
- Gravdahl, John
- Haller, Carmit
- He, Jianping
- Hickmann, Fons
- Hillman, David
- Hinrichs, Kit
- Hofmann, Matthias
- Huerta, Gerard
- Hvass&Hannibal
- Ide, Toshiaki
- Igarashi, Takenobu
- Imboden, Melchior
- Jeker, Werner
- Kamekura, Yusaku
- Katsui, Mitsuo
- KMS TEAM GmbH
- Ljubicic, Boris
- Lloyd, Doug
- Loesch, Uwe
- Loiri, Pekka
- Lorenc, Jan
- Lubalin, Herb
- Machado, João
- Matsuda, Jisuke
- Matsunaga, Shin
- Matthies, Holger
- McCandliss and Campbell
- Minini, Marcos
- Miyake, Issey
- Morla, Jennifer
- Müller-Brockman, Josef
- Nygaard, Finn
- Osborne, Michael
- PepsiCo Design & Innovation
- Pérez, Álvaro
- Peteet, Rex
- Piippo, Kari
- Pirtle, Woody
- Porsche, F.A.
- Poulin, Richard
- Pulfer, Adrian
- Rambow, Gunter
- Rand, Paul
- Reisinger, Dan
- Rhubarb
- Rodriguez, Robert
- Sagmeister, Stefan
- Sagmeister & Walsh
- Saito, Makoto
- Sandstrom, Steve
- Satoh, Taku
- Throndsen, Morten
- Scher, Paula
- Schmidt, Anders
- Schwab, Michael
- Simmons, Art
- Stavro, Astrid (Atlas)
- Skolos Wedell
- Smith, Marlena Buczek
- Sottsass, Ettore
- Stout, DJ
- Stranger & Stranger
- Studio Eduardo Aires
- Sych, Paul
- Taft, Ron
- Tanaka, Ikko
- Throndsen, Morten
- Troxler, Miklaus
- Turner Duckworth
- Vanderbyl, Michael
- Vignelli, Lella
- Vignelli, Massimo
- Wilker, Karlsson
- Woodward, Fred
- Tagi, Tamotsu
- Zhang, Li

Photography

- Almas, Erik
- Azevedo, Athena
- Balog, James
- Buckley, Dana
- Colrat, Pascal
- Cutler, Craig
- DeBoer, Bruce
- Cumptich, Ricardo de Vidq de
- Diodato, Bill
- Faulkner, Colin
- Fellman, Sandi
- Flach, Tim
- Frankel, Laurie
- Furman, Michael
- Greenfield-Sanders, Timothy
- Gudnason, Torkil
- Terry Heffernan
- Iooss, Walter
- joSon
- JUCO
- Knight, Nick
- Knopf, Caroline
- Knowles, Jonathan
- Kohanim, Parish
- Kretschmer, Hugh
- Laita, Mark
- Leutwyler, Henry
- Madere, John
- Marco, Phil
- McCandliss and Campbell
- Mendlowitz, Benjamin M.
- RJ Muna
- Musilek, Stan
- Newell, Lennette
- Norberg, Marc
- O'Brien, Michael
- Olson, Rosanne
- Poon, Kah
- Robert, Francois
- Saraceno, Joseph
- Schatz, Howard
- Schoenfeld, Michael
- Seliger, Mark
- Shoan, Tatijana
- Stirton, Brent
- Tardio, Robert
- Turner, Pete
- Vasquez, Rafael
- Voorhes, Adam
- Wartenberg, Frank P.
- Watson, Albert
- Weitz, Allan
- Wilson, Christopher
- Zuckerman, Andrew

Advertising

- Bailey Lauerman
- BBDO
- Carmichael Lynch
- Corcoran, Colin
- daDá, david chandi
- DeVito, Sal
- DM9 DDB
- Fallon, Pat
- Gargano, Amil
- Goodby Silverstein & Partner
- Krone, Helmut
- Lewis Communications
- Lloyd, Doug
- Ogilvy, David
- Robert Talarczyk
- Wieden + Kennedy
- Zulu Alpha Kilo

Art/Illustration

- Billout, Guy
- Blackshear, Thomas
- Braldt, Bralds
- Cosgrove, Dan
- Deas, Michael
- Fasolino, Teresa
- Flagg, James M.
- Forbes, Bart
- Foster, Jeff
- Staudinger + Franke
- Frazier, Craig
- Glenwood, Michael
- Hess, Richard
- Hess, Mark
- Hvass&Hannibal
- Johnson, Doug
- Kraemer, Peter
- Larsson, Carl
- Mottos, John
- O'Brien, Tim
- Pantuso, Michael
- Parrish, Maxfield
- Pelavin, Daniel
- Rockwell, Norman
- Rodriguez, Robert
- Stahl, Nancy
- Summers, Mark
- Talarczyk, Robert
- Unruh, Jack
- Vasarely, Victor
- Wyeth, N.C.

Education

- Anselmo, Frank
- Bartlett, Brad
- Bekker, Phil
- DeVito, Sal
- Seung-Min Han & Dong-Joo Park
- Goldberg, Carin
- Mariucci, Jack
- Pulfer, Adrian
- Richardson, Hank
- Smith, Mark T.
- Sommese, Lanny
- Sommese, Kristin
- White, Mel
