= Wolfram Siebeck =

German television presenter, journalist and author

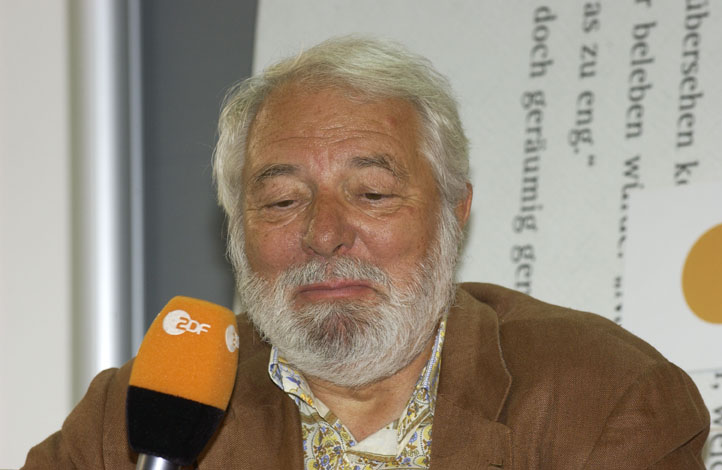
- Wolfram Siebeck in 2004
- Born: 19 September 1928; Duisburg
- Died: 7 July 2016 (aged 87); Lahr
- Occupations: journalist, author, food critic
- Years active: 1948–2016

Wolfram Siebeck (19 September 1928 – 7 July 2016) was a German journalist, author and food critic. With his satirical style of writing he used to criticise fast food, TV dinners, subsidised agriculture and intensive animal farming.

== Biography ==
Wolfram Siebeck was born in Duisburg to administrative clerk and later landlord Walter Siebeck. He grew up in Essen and Bochum. Siebeck witnessed the end of World War II serving as a Luftwaffenhelfer in northern Germany where he was also taken prisoner of war by allied forces. The British Army interned him on Fehmarn island for a few months.

During the first post-war years, Siebeck earned his living by painting advertising signs. When the Westdeutsche Allgemeine Zeitung was founded in 1948, Siebeck was hired to work as an illustrator. Later, he worked together with his friend Roland Topor.

Due to an inheritance, Siebeck was able to study at a fine arts school in Wuppertal from 1950. This was also the time of his first journey to France. When Willy Fleckhaus founded Twen magazine in Cologne, Siebeck got to write a culinary column for the magazine. For many years, he was also a regular writer with a monthly column in Stern, Die Zeit, and Der Feinschmecker. Moreover, published books as a food critic. Starting in 2011, his contributions to Die Zeit became fewer. Instead, Siebeck wrote a blog until 2015 called Wo isst Siebeck – Ein Reisetagebuch ['Where does Siebeck eat? – An itinerary'].

Wolfram Siebeck died on 7 July 2016 in Lahr, Germany.

=== Personal life ===
From 1959 to 1969, Siebeck was married to his first wife Erika. He married Barbara McBride, née Wilke, in 1969. She had three sons (Shawn, Robin and Brian McBride) from her previous marriage with the American photographer Will McBride.

Siebeck and his family moved to Widdersberg at Lake Ammersee in 1969. From this place, Wolfram and Barbara Siebeck began to start their first 'culinary travels' which were mostly bound to France. In the early 1980s, they moved to Schondorf.

From the end of the 1980s on, Siebeck and his wife Barbara used to live in a castle in Mahlberg near Lahr, Baden-Württemberg but spent the summer seasons in Puy-Saint-Martin, France.

== Work ==
According to Siebeck, his journalistic columns as well as his books were written to achieve a certain goal: his readership should be sensitised to the idea that food and drink should always be of the highest possible quality. In his publications, Siebeck wrote against fast food, TV dinners, discount store food, subsidised farming and intensive animal production, but also criticised a lack of table manners and the German cuisine which he considered bad. His style was satirical and sarcastic, and often deliberately insulting.

In the 1980s, the Südwestfunk broadcasting corporation produced and aired a 12-episodes television show that was initiated by Swiss documentary filmer Roman Brodmann who was also a gourmet. For each episode, Siebeck would invite top chefs to his home and cook a menu for them. His guests included Marc Haeberlin, Emile Jung, Hans Stucki and Heinz Winkler. The chefs would then rate Siebeck's cooking and presentation of the menu. The series was cancelled when Brodmann died in 1990.

== Reception ==
In 1981, Neue Deutsche Welle band Foyer des Arts dedicated a song to him called "Siebeck hat recht!" [Siebeck is right].

=== Portrayal in television documentaries ===
Wolfram Siebeck's work and life was repeatedly portrayed in television documentaries and programmes.

- 1997: "Vorkoster der Nation" [lit. "The national taster"]. Produced by Spiegel TV and shot in Siebecks house in France.
- 2004: "Lebenslinien: Weltbürger und Grenzgänger – der Küchenpapst Wolfram Siebeck" [lit. "A cosmopolitan who pushes the edge – the kitchen Pope Wolfram Siebeck]. Produced by Bayerischer Rundfunk, shot in Mahlberg and France.
- 2006: "Gero von Boehm begegnet Wolfram Siebeck" [Gero von Boehm meets Wolfram Siebeck], 30 minutes interview. Produced by Interscience Film, 3sat.

=== Awards and honours ===
- Knight of the Order of Agricultural Merit, France, 1991
- Officer's Cross of the Order of Merit of the Federal Republic of Germany, 2003
- Golden Decoration for Merits to the Federal State of Vienna, Austria, 2008

== Selected works ==
- Wolfram Siebecks Kochschule für Anspruchsvolle. Munich: Nymphenburger. 1976. ISBN 3-485-00264-X.
- Sonntag in deutschen Töpfen. Munich: Nymphenburger. 1982. ISBN 3-485-00424-3.
- Die schönsten und besten Bistros von Paris. Vol. 1–2. Munich: Heyne. 1988. ISBN 3-453-04361-8.
- Das Haar in der Suppe hab' ich nicht bestellt. Frankfurt am Main: Eichborn. 1992. ISBN 3-8218-1296-6.
- Die Deutschen und ihre Küche. Berlin: Rowohlt. 2007. ISBN 978-3-87134-583-8.
- Alle meine Rezepte. Bubenreuth: Calle-Arco. 2018. ISBN 978-3-00012-133-3.
