= Instant Stories =

Photo book by Wim Wenders

- Author: Wim Wenders
- Language: English
- Genre: Photography book
- Published: 2017
- Publisher: Thames & Hudson
- Publication place: United Kingdom
- Pages: 320

Instant Stories is a photography book by German filmmaker and photographer Wim Wenders, published in 2017. The book is a collection of more than 400 polaroid photographs taken from 1968 to 2017, mostly in the 1970s and 1980s. The book and the related exhibition where received with high critical acclaim.

== Content ==
The book documents a large quantity of polaroid's taken by Wenders under the most diverse circumstances, presenting places, with street and landscape photographs, and events during his film career, specially in the 1970s, including his first travels to the United States, portraits of friends and actors, a travel to Japan to meet Yasujiro Ozu, and film theaters in Germany. Wenders himself wrote the explanatory texts, short stories and haikus of the book. Wenders explained that his purpose back then, more than creating art, was to document life: "It was just part of my life. I would photograph things to do with movies I was making, or when I travelled. It was useful and fun - which I think is what Polaroids were for most people."

== Exhibition ==
The book was accompanied by the exhibition "Instant Stories/Wim Wenders' Polaroids", which took place at The Photographers' Gallery, in London, from 20 October 2017 to 11 February 2018.

== Reception ==
The British Journal of Photography praised the book and described it as a "love letter to the Polaroid". Charlotte Irwin, at Financial Times, also praised the book, considering that "Whether it's an intimate glimpse of actor Dennis Hopper or an empty Western landscape, the pictures act as an authentic, unedited documentation of Wenders's life and work, and show the beauty of photography before the filtered age."
