= Skirrow =

Skirrow is an English name, thought possibly to derive from the village of Sharrow in Yorkshire. Many Yorkshire words beginning with the letters sk are the result of Viking influence, though this does not necessarily mean that Skirrow's are of Viking origin. Though the name is now found worldwide, almost all Skirrow's can trace their ancestors to Yorkshire, and in particular to the towns of Baildon and Otley in the nineteenth century .

There is a row of houses in Baildon that were referred to in the census as 'Skirrow houses' which were occupied in the nineteenth century by a line of Skirrow's working in the wollen mills making worsted cloth, but it is not known whether the houses were owned by a mill owner named Skirrow. There is a street in Bradford called Skirrow street.

Skirrow Street is in Bingley, Bradford, BD16, England, (origin not known). It can be seen on Google Local Maps (just enter the name and click search maps) .

== Notable Skirrows ==
- Desmond Skirrow (1923–1976), British novelist
- John Skirrow Wright (1822-1880) was one of the prominent pioneers and social improvers of the 19th century. He also invented the postal order.
- Harry Skirrow made and raced midget speedway cars which are now collector's items.
- Noah Skirrow (born 1998), Canadian baseball player
