= Guillermo Mordillo =

Argentine cartoonist (1932–2019)

Mordillo
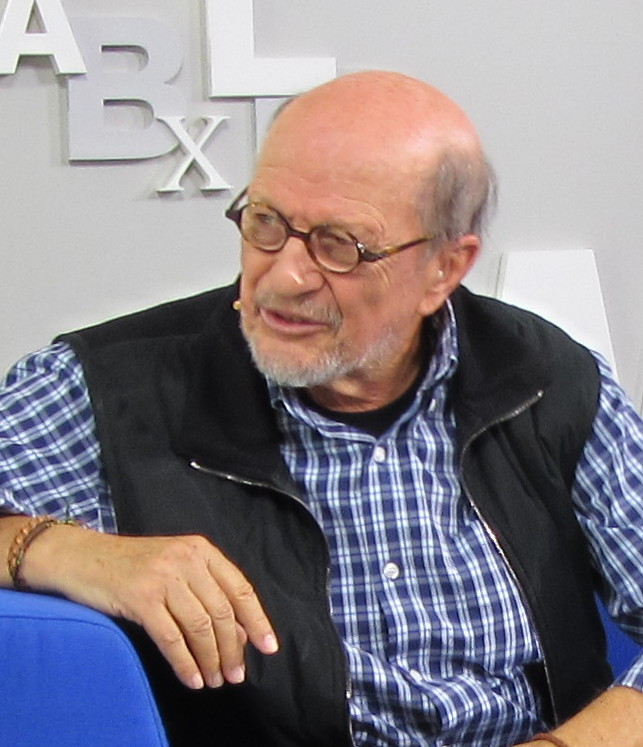
- Born: 4 August 1932 Buenos Aires, Argentina
- Died: 29 June 2019 (aged 86) Palma de Mallorca, Spain
- Notable works: Crazy Cowboy; Crazy Crazy; Les Girafes
- Awards: full list

Guillermo Mordillo (4 August 1932 – 29 June 2019), known simply as Mordillo, was an Argentine creator of cartoons and animations and was one of the most widely published cartoonists of the 1970s. He is most famous for his humorous, colorful, surreal and wordless depictions of love, sports (in particular soccer and golf), and long-necked animals.

From 1976 to 1981, Mordillo's cartoons were used by Slovenian artist Miki Muster to create Mordillo, a series of 400 short animations (300 min) that were later presented at Cannes and bought by television studios from 30 countries.

== Biography ==
The son of Spanish parents, Mordillo spent his childhood in Villa Pueyrredón in Buenos Aires, where he had an early interest in drawing. In 1948 he obtained the certificate of Illustrator from the School of Journalism. Two years later, while continuing to study, as part of the animation team Burone Bruch he illustrated children's stories (Tales of Perrault Tales of Schmid, The Musicians of Bremen and The Three Little Pigs) edited by Codex. In 1952 he co-founded Galas Studios, dedicated to the production of animations. Meanwhile, he continued to develop his career as an illustrator and published some strips in local magazines.

On 7 November 1955, he moved to Lima, Peru, where he worked as a freelance designer for the advertising company McCann Erickson. In 1958 Aesop's Fables illustrated and Samaniego for Editorial Iberia Lima.

After having done greeting-card illustrations for the Kansas City-based Hallmark Cards, he left for the United States in 1960. When there he was employed by Paramount Pictures Studios in New York. Part of the performance of the film in two globally significant characters: Popeye and Little Lulu and creates two characters for the short film Trick for tree.

Three years later, on 20 August his life changed direction again. This time he travelled to Europe, arriving in Paris on 19 September. There, he worked at first humorous letters to Mic-Max Edition. In July 1966 he began to collaborate with the magazine Le Pelerin and shortly after doing the same in Paris Match. Two years later, his work started being printed in publications from other parts of the world, most notably Germany's Stern. In Paris he met his wife Amparo Camarasa, marrying in 1969. They have two children: Sebastian Jerome (1970) and Cecile Isabelle (1972).

In 1980 he moved to Mallorca, Spain, and was named President of the International Association of Authors of Comics and Cartoons (CFIA) based in Geneva, Switzerland. After 18 years in Spain, he returned to France in 1998. The following year he participated in the Creative Workshop Zermatt, Switzerland.

In 2007 he experimented with new materials: acrylics, pastels and crayons. The following year he performed with Art Petrus a series of reproductions of pictures in high definition. Also that year he sold a numbered and autographed internet publication, Mordillo Collection.

He resided in Monaco.

== Bibliography ==
- The Damp and Daffy Doings of a Daring Pirate Ship, 1971, Harlin Quist Inc., New York, USA.
  - Also published as Le Galion, 1970, Harlin Quist, Paris, France; All' Arrembaggio!, 1971, Emme Edizione, Milano, Italy;
- Das Piratenschiff, 1971, Insel Verlag, Frankfurt, Germany; Soroverskibet, Host et Son, Copenhagen, Denmark; O Barco Dos Piratas, Publicacoes Dom Quixote, Lisboa.
- The Collected Cartoons of Mordillo, (with foreword by John Bailey), 1971, Crown Publishers, New York, USA.
  - Also published as Der Grosse Mordillo, 1974, foreword by Manfred Schmidt, Verlag Gerhard Stalling AG, Oldenburg and Hamburg, Germany, ISBN 3-7979-1646-9.
- Crazy Cowboy, 1972, Harlin Quist Inc., New York, USA.
  - Also published under the same title by Harlin Quist, Paris; Insel Verlag, Frankfurt, Germany, ISBN 3-458-33704-0 and Emme Edizioni, Milano.
- Das Giraffenbuch, 1973, Insel Verlag, Frankfurt, Germany, ISBN 3-458-31737-6.
  - Also published as: Toutes Les Giraffes, 1983, all-color hardcover, Editions Glénat, Grenoble, France.
- Das Giraffenbuch II, 1974, Insel Verlag, Frankfurt, Germany, ISBN 3-458-31771-6.
- Crazy Crazy Das Dschungelbuch, 1974, Insel Verlag, Frankfurt, Germany.
- Grosse Pläne kleine Steine, 1975, Friedrich W.Heye Verlag, München, Germany.
- Mordillo's Träumereien - und andere wunderliche Geschichten, 1975, Insel Verlag, Frankfurt, Germany, ISBN 3-458-31808-9.
- Der kleine Mordillo, 1976, Verlag Gerhard Stalling AG, Oldenburg and Hamburg, Germany, ISBN 3-7979-1656-6.
- Opus I, 1976, Friedrich W.Heye Verlag GmbH, München, Germany, 88-page softcover, Weltbild Verlag, printed in Italy, ISBN 3-88141-013-9.
- Opus I, 1976, Friedrich W.Heye Verlag GmbH, München, Germany, 88-page hardcover, Oli Verlag N.V. Verlag, printed in Germany, ISBN 3-88141-000-7.
- carton No 5 (Mordillo) - Les Cahiers du Dessin D'Humour, 1976, Edition Glenat, France.
- Mordillo: Cartoons zum Verlieben, 1977, Deutscher Taschenbuch Verlag GmbH & Co. KG, München, Germany, unter Lizenz von Verlag Gerhard Stalling AG, Oldenburg and Hamburg, Germany ISBN 3-7979-1646-9.
- Opus II, 1978, (with foreword by Marcel Marceau). Friedrich W.Heye Verlag, München, Germany, 88-page softcover, Weltbild Verlag, printed in Italy, ISBN 3-88141-018-X.
- Opus II, 1978, (with foreword by Marcel Marceau). Friedrich W.Heye Verlag, München, Germany, 88-page hardcover, Weltbild Verlag, printed in Italy.
- Opus III, 1978, Friedrich W.Heye Verlag, München, Germany (44-page hardcover French edition 1980, Editions Glénat, Grenoble, France; 88-page softcover Italian edition 1983, Weltbild Verlag, printed in Italy), ISBN 3-88141-557-2.
- Opus III, 1983, Friedrich W.Heye Verlag, München/Hamburg, Germany 88-page hardcover, ISBN 3-88141-017-1.
- Opus IV, 1978, Friedrich W.Heye Verlag GmbH, Hamburg - München, Germany (44-page hardcover French edition 1982, Editions Glénat, Grenoble, France ISBN 2-7234-0282-7).
- Wie eine Jungfrau entsteht, 1978, Friedrich W.Heye Verlag GmbH, München and Hamburg, Germany, ISBN 3-88141-500-9.
- La Coppia, 1979, Arnoldo Mondadori Editore, Milano, Italy.
- Mordillo Giraffenparade, 1980, Friedrich W.Heye Verlag GmbH, München and Hamburg, Germany, ISBN 3-88141-019-8.
- Variationen über das menschliche Wesen Cartoons, 1980, Friedrich W.Heye Verlag GmbH, Hamburg, Germany, ISBN 3-88141-000-7.
- Mordillo Football, 1981, (with foreword by Pelé). Century Hutchinson, London, Great Britain. French edition 1981, Editions Glénat, Grenoble, France.
  - Also published as: Mordillo Football, 1981, (with foreword by Pelé). Wilhelm Heye Verlag, München and Hamburg, Germany, ISBN 3-88141-012-0.
- Neue Variationen über das menschliche Wesen Cartoons, 1981, Friedrich W.Heye Verlag GmbH, Hamburg, Germany, ISBN 3-88141-001-5.
- Mordillo: Giraffenparade Cartoons, 1982, Deutscher Taschenbuch Verlag GmbH & Co. KG, München, Germany, ISBN 3-88141-005-8.
- Opus V, 1983, Friedrich W.Heye Verlag GmbH, Hamburg - München, Germany (88-page hardcover French edition 1984, Editions Glénat, Grenoble, France).
- Mordillo Football Cartoons, 1984, (with foreword by Pelé). Wilhelm Heye Verlag, München and Hamburg, Germany, ISBN 3-88141-012-0.
- Eckbälle und Zwischenfälle, 1985, Eulenspiegel Verlag, Berlin.
- Mordillo Lovestory, 1985, (with foreword by Jane Birkin). Editions Glénat, Grenoble, France.
  - Also published as: Mordillo Lovestory,1987, Wilhelm Heyne Verlag, München, Germany, ISBN 3-453-02555-5.
- Mordillo Blick zurück nach vorn, 1985, Wilhelm Heye Verlag, München and Hamburg, Germany, ISBN 3-88141-027-9.
- Mordillo Golf, 1987, (with foreword by Roberto De Vicenzo). Century Hutchinson, London, Great Britain, printed in Italy by Arnoldo Mondadori Editore, Milano, Italy.
  - Also published as: Mordillo Golf,1987, (with foreword by Roberto De Vicenzo). Wilhelm Heyne Verlag, München, Germany, ISBN 978-0091734787.
- Mordillo Golf,1987, Wilhelm Heyne Verlag, München, Germany, ISBN 3-453-04845-8.
- Mordillo Safari, 1990, Wilhelm Heyne Verlag, München, Germany, ISBN 3-453-06394-5.
  - Also published as: Mordillo Safari, French edition 1990, Editions Glénat, Grenoble, France.
- Mordillo Deine Sterne Das grosse Geburtstagsbuch, 1992, Wilhelm Heye Verlag, München and Hamburg Germany, ISBN 3-89400-469-X
- Mordillo Cartoons, 1992, (with foreword by Gerhard Kaufmann). Wilhelm Heye Verlag, München and Hamburg, Germany, ISBN 3-89400-614-5.
- Mordillo Amore Amore, 1994, (with foreword by Giovanni Mariotti). Arnoldo Mondadori Editore, Milano, Italy.
  - Also published as Amore Amore, 1994, (with foreword by Giovanni Mariotti). Lappan Verlag GmbH, Oldenburg, Germany, ISBN 3-89082-498-6.
- Mordillo Para Deportistas (For Sportsmen), 1997, Editions Glénat, Arnoldo Mondadori Editore, Milano, Italy.
  - Also published as Mordillo für Sportler, 1995, Lappan Verlag GmbH, Oldenburg, Germany, ISBN 3-89082-575-3.
- Mordillo Para Enamorados (For Lovers), 1997, Editions Glénat, Arnoldo Mondadori Editore, Milano, Italy.
  - Also published as Mordillo für Verliebte, 1995, Lappan Verlag GmbH, Oldenburg, Germany, ISBN 3-89082-758-6.
- Mordillo Para Matrimonios (For Marriages), 1997, Editions Glénat, Arnoldo Mondadori Editore, Milano, Italy.
  - Also published as Mordillo zur Hochzeit, 1995, Lappan Verlag GmbH, Oldenburg, Germany, ISBN 3-89082-571-0.
- Mordillo Para Superhombres (For Supermen), 1997, Editions Glénat, Arnoldo Mondadori Editore, Milano, Italy.
  - Also published as Mordillo für den tollen Mann, 1995, Lappan Verlag GmbH, Oldenburg, Germany, ISBN 3-89082-572-9.
- Mordillo Para Supermujeres (For Superwomen), 1997, Editions Glénat, Arnoldo Mondadori Editore, Milano, Italy.
  - Also published as Mordillo für die tolle Frau, 1995, Lappan Verlag GmbH, Oldenburg, Germany, ISBN 3-89082-573-7.
- Mordillo Para Las Vacaciones (For The Holidays), 1997, Editions Glénat, Arnoldo Mondadori Editore, Milano, Italy.
  - Also published as Mordillo für Urlauber, 1995, Lappan Verlag GmbH, Oldenburg, Germany, ISBN 3-89082-574-5.
- Mordillo Para Hinchas (For Sports Fans), 1997, Editions Glénat, Arnoldo Mondadori Editore, Milano, Italy.
  - Also published as Mordillo Für Fussballfans!, 1997, Lappan Verlag GmbH, Oldenburg, Germany, ISBN 3-89082-760-8.
- Mordillo Para Parejas (For Couples), 1997, Editions Glénat, Arnoldo Mondadori Editore, Milano, Italy.

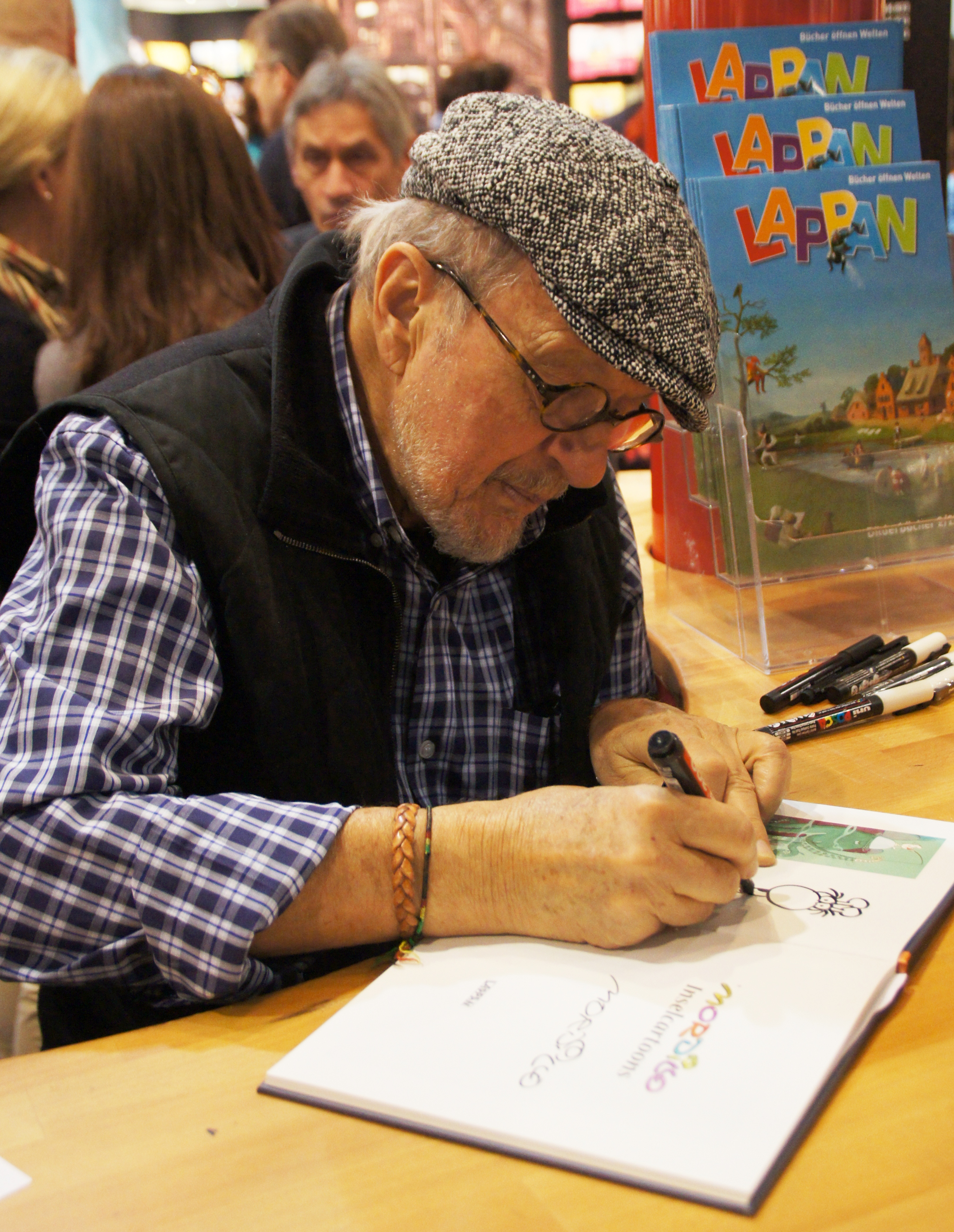
Mordillo at 2012 Frankfurt Book Fair signing his Lappan cartoon books

  - Also published as Mordillo Für Das Leben Zu Zweit! (Für Paare), 1997, Lappan Verlag GmbH, Oldenburg, Germany. ISBN 3-89082-758-6.
- Mordillo Para Triunfadores (For Winners), 1997, Editions Glénat, Arnoldo Mondadori Editore, Milano, Italy.
  - Also published as Mordillo Für Erfolgreiche! (Für Sieger), 1997, Lappan Verlag GmbH, Oldenburg, Germany ISBN 3-89082-757-8.
- Mordillo Para Gente con Perro (For Dog People), 1997, Editions Glénat, Arnoldo Mondadori Editore, Milano, Italy.
  - Also published as Mordillo für Hundefreunde, 1997, Lappan Verlag GmbH, Oldenburg, Germany, ISBN 3-89082-759-4.
- Mordillo Zusammen! (Together!), 2003, Lappan Verlag GmbH, Munchen, Germany, ISBN 3-8303-3061-8.
- Mordillo Eine Liebesgeschichte, 2005, Lappan Verlag GmbH, Oldenburg, Germany, ISBN 3-8303-3108-8.
- Mordillo Starke Frauen, 2006, Lappan Verlag GmbH, Oldenburg, Germany, ISBN 978-3830361367.
- Mordillo Tolle Männer, 2006, Lappan Verlag GmbH, Oldenburg, Germany, ISBN 978-3-8303-6135-0.
- Mordillo Alles Gute!, 2007, Lappan Verlag GmbH, Oldenburg, Germany, ISBN 978-3-8303-6148-0.
- Mordillo für Golfer, 2007, Lappan Verlag GmbH, Oldenburg, Germany, ISBN 978-3-8303-6138-1.
- Mordillo zur Hochzeit, 2008, Lappan Verlag GmbH, Oldenburg, Germany, ISBN 978-3-8303-6158-9.
- Mordillo für Fussballer, 2010, Lappan Verlag GmbH, Oldenburg, Germany, ISBN 978-3-8303-6183-1.
- Mordillo Auf die Liebe!, 2012, Lappan Verlag GmbH, Oldenburg, Germany, ISBN 978-3-8303-6229-6.
- Mordillo Inselcartoons, 2012, Lappan Verlag GmbH, Oldenburg, Germany, ISBN 978-3-8303-6228-9.

== Awards ==
- 1969 Silver Medal at the V International Biennale of humorous designs at Tolentino
- 1971 Loisirs Jeunes Award, Paris
- 1971 Critici En Herba Award, Bologna, for the children's book Pirate ship
- 1972 Silver Medal of the first International Festival of Humorous Designs in Sarajevo
- 1973 Phénix de l'Humour, Paris
- 1974 Association of Argentine Designers Award
- 1976 El Gaucho Award, Köln
- 1976 Nakamori Award, Tokyo, for the children's book Crazy Cowboy
- 1977 Best Cartoonist of the year at the Salon International de l'Humour in Montreal
- 1977 Palme d'Or at the 31st International Festival of the Humor of Bordighera
- 1983 Palme d'Or at the 36th International Festival of the Humor of Bordighera
- 1985 Andersen Award at Sestri Levante
- 1992 Konex Award, Argentina
- 1994 U Giancu's Prize, International Cartoonists Exhibition, Rapallo, Italy
- 1995 Gold Medal at the 18th International Tolentino Fair of Humour
