= Albert Cullum =

Albert Cullum (November 1921 – July 2003) was an American Elementary school teacher in the 1960s. Instead of the standard Dick and Jane style of teaching, he opted to introduce his children to classic literature such as Shakespeare and Greek Dramas. Unlike other teachers at the time, Cullum strongly believed that learning and play could be combined in the classroom. Cullum was the author of numerous books about education including The Geranium On The Windowsill Just Died But Teacher You Went Right On, which sold over half a million copies.

He taught at St. Luke's School in Greenwich Village in the 1940s, and at Midland School in Rye, New York in the 1950s. He then went on to become a professor of education at Boston University and at Stonehill College.

Many of Cullum's pedagogical experiments and class performances were captured on film by filmmaker Robert Downey Sr.

Albert Cullum died at his home in Massachusetts near the campus of Stonehill College in July 2003 at the age of 81.

A documentary called A Touch of Greatness was made about his life in 2004.

== Bibliography ==
- Greek and Roman Plays: for the intermediate grades, paramount communications company, 1993 ISBN 0-86653-941-7
- Blackboard, Blackboard on the Wall, Who Is the Fairest One of All?, Harlin Quist, Inc. 1978 ISBN 0-8252-0728-2
- The Geranium On The Windowsill Just Died But Teacher You Went Right On Harlin Quist, Inc. 1971. Adapted into a musical starring renowned child actor Dalton Hartwell, and resulting in his five Wilde Award Nominations.
- Push Back the Desks, MacMillan Publishing Company, 1967. ISBN 978-0590097130
