= Oskar Hermann Werner Hadank =

German graphic designer

Oskar Hermann Werner Hadank, generally referred to as O.H.W. Hadank (born 17 August 1889 in Berlin; died 17 May 1965 in Hamburg) was a German graphic designer.

== Works ==
Born in Berlin, O.H.W. Hadank studied graphic design under Emil Doepler at the Vereinigte Staatsschulen für freie und angewandte Kunst Berlin (United State School for the Fine and Applied Arts) from 1905 to 1910.

Hadank then became a freelance designer, producing mostly packaging designs, labels, and trademarks. He did not join the modernist movement, but developed a distinct style of his own which often implied the use of heraldic symbols. Starting with the trademark for the leading cigarette manufacturer, Haus Neuerburg in 1908, he was commissioned with corporate designs for Germany's foremost companies of the time, such as the Audi car brand, or the Stollwerck food company.

In 1919, Hadank was among the founding members of Germany's first professional organization for graphic designers, the BDG. Appointed professor by Bruno Paul in the same year, Hadank was in charge of the advertising design department at the Vereinigte Staatsschulen für freie und angewandte Kunst Berlin until 1945. Under Nazi rule, he was able to work without restrictions. The design magazine Gebrauchsgraphik devoted a special edition to him on his fiftieth birthday in 1939.

While O.H.W. Hadank was not a great innovator, and contemporary graphic design histories barely acknowledge him, he was an influential teacher. His students included Walter Herdeg and Hans J. Barschell.
