= Desmond Skirrow =

British advertising executive and novelist

John Desmond Skirrow (13 November 1923 – 16 August 1976) was a British advertising executive and novelist.

== Writing career ==
Skirrow was born in Barry, South Wales. In 1963, Skirrow met Alida Haskins, who showed him the maquette of Cowboy Kate & Other Stories by Sam Haskins, and he put words to the visual story devised by Sam and Alida. Alida introduced him to Sam's publisher, the Bodley Head in London, who went on to publish his thriller novels. Sam's next book, November Girl, was published in 1966 and Skirrow provided the text for the melancholic visual story.

While working as an advertising executive in the mid-1960s Skirrow commuted daily from Brighton to London, and he wrote 1,000 words a day until he had a 70,000-word novel. This was It Won't Get You Anywhere, the first of three spy novels about fictional British agent John Brock. Like his creator, Brock works in advertising in London, but is also a part-time agent for an undercover department run by The Fat Man. Penthouse magazine said that both Brock and Skirrow were likeable, soft-hearted and rather shy. Skirrow denied that he and Brock had any similarity, noting that his hair was blonde and Brock's is black. According to Brian Ash, Skirrow "resembled a latter-day Chesterton." Ruth Martin, writing for Books & Bookmen, described Skirrow as "Tall, big, bearded and seemingly incapable of being serious for more than a few minutes at a time."

Two sequels followed: I Was Following This Girl and I'm Trying to Give It Up, tough, irreverent, and witty. Punch called them "the Chandler formula, basically, but louder and funnier." Penthouse said "between the punch-ups and chases and killings paint a wildly amusing cynical-eye view of the glossy, hysterical world of advertising."

Skirrow also wrote a children's book, The Case of The Silver Egg, televised as The Queen Street Gang, about the adventures of a group of boys tracking down a gang of villains. Books and Bookmen refers to an unpublished sequel.

Skirrow's frequently anthologised poem "Ode on a Grecian Urn Summarized" parodies John Keats' Ode on a Grecian Urn. First published in the New Statesman in 1960, it appeared in the New Oxford Book of Light Verse edited by Kingsley Amis. Vanderbilt University coined the term "Skirrowing" for a terse parody of a great poetic work.

BBC Radio 2 Woman's Hour serialised It Won't Get You Anywhere between 2 and 13 November 1970.

== Advertising and art career ==
After World War II, Skirrow taught art in the countryside. In 1953 or 1954 he joined WS Crawford where he worked alongside Paul Peter Piech under Ashley Havinden.

During the late 1950s and early 1960s, Skirrow illustrated book jackets for the British publishers Heinemann and Secker & Warburg, including for Fred Hoyle's The Black Cloud, Max Shulman's Rally Round the Flag, Boys!, James A. Michener's Hawaii and William L. Shirer's The Rise and Fall of the Third Reich.

In 1962, David Bernstein, creative director at McCann Erickson, hired Skirrow and Robert Brownjohn as his deputy creative directors at its London office. Bernstein described Skirrow as "a craftsman".

Skirrow was the Creative Director of major London advertising agency Masius Wynne-Williams, where his colleagues included novelist Christopher Wood and Murray Walker – Walker claims that he and Skirrow disliked each other intensely.

== Death ==
He died on 16 August 1976, aged 52, at The Avenue Clinic in Hove and was cremated at Downs Crematorium, Brighton, on 23 August 1976.

== Bibliography ==
=== John Brock novels ===
- It Won't Get You Anywhere (1966)
- I Was Following This Girl (1967)
- I'm Trying to Give It Up (1968)

=== Other novels ===
- The Case of the Silver Egg (1966) – with illustrations by Robin Jacques
- Poor Quail (1969)

=== Other books ===
- Cowboy Kate & Other Stories (1964) – with photographs by Sam Haskins
- November Girl (1967) – with photographs by Sam Haskins

=== Jacket art for other authors ===
- Hoyle, Fred. The Black Cloud. London: Heinemann (1957)
- Hawke, Jessica; Upfield, Arthur. Follow My Dust! A Biography of Arthur Upfield. London: Heinemann (1957)
- Shulman, Max. Rally Round the Flag, Boys!. London: Heinemann (1958)
- Shirer, William L. The Rise and Fall of the Third Reich. London: Secker & Warburg (1960, plus other impressions)
- Michener, James A. Hawaii. London: Secker & Warburg (1960)

== See also ==
- Skirrow – English name
