= Harlin Quist =

American children's book publisher

Harlin Quist (born Harlin Bloomquist; July 14, 1930 – May 13, 2000) was a publisher noted for innovative children's books.

== Early years ==
Harlin Bloomquist was born and raised in Virginia, Minnesota, attended Carnegie Tech and began his career in 1958 as an off-Broadway actor and producer. His 1959 production of Chekhov's Ivanov won four Obie awards. He also worked at Crowell-Collier and Dell Publishing until striking out on his own by establishing his own company, Harlin Quist, Inc. (Harlin Quist Books), in 1965.

== Career ==
Harlin Quist Books published over sixty children's books between 1966 and 1984 in the US and through a partnership in France. He gave the start to some notable authors and illustrators, including Guillermo Mordillo, Albert Cullum, Guy Billout, and Nicole Claveloux. These books were praised for their illustrations and plots. In 1981, he won a National Book Award for cover design.

During the 1980s, he returned to theater and rehabilitated the NorShor Theatre, an Art Deco movie theater in Duluth, Minnesota. In the 1990s, Quist published books in France, where he spent most of his time. He established a company in Paris with French designer and illustrator Patrick Couratin and they reissued limited editions of some of his best-known books as well as publishing new ones for European distribution. Quist received an award from the French government for his achievements as a book publisher in Europe.

== Last years and death ==
In 1994, he became ill with Myasthenia gravis. In 1997 the Salon du Livre de Jeunesse in Paris (Youth Book Fair in France) held a retrospective of his original art and first editions books in French and English. He died on May 13, 2000, aged 69, suffering from myasthenia gravis and complications from a recent hip replacement. Quist was survived by his three siblings and extended family.

== See also ==
- François Ruy-Vidal
