= Christa Peters =

German fashion photographer

Christa Peters (1933–1981) was a German fashion photographer.

Peters worked for many magazines, including Twen, Der Spiegel, Stern, Praline, Vogue, and Nova.

In 1966, she teamed up with her future husband, fellow photographer Chadwick Hall. After her death from a "serious disease" and suffering from grief, Hall burnt her entire archive.
