= Guy Billout =

French artist and illustrator (born 1941)

- Born: Guy Billout; July 7, 1941 (age 84); Decize, France
- Education: Ecole des Arts Appliqués
- Known for: Illustration, fine artist
- Awards: Hamilton King Award, 1989; Society of Illustrators Hall of Fame, 2016

Guy Billout (born July 7, 1941) is a French artist and illustrator. In 1989, Billout received the Hamilton King Award and in 2016, he was inducted into the Society of Illustrators Hall of Fame.

Billout's aesthetic style is described as clean, spare and precise, often incorporating some ironic element, with lush colors and exquisite craftsmanship. His style and technique often portrays a surreal parallel dream world where something is out of kilter.

== Early life and education ==
Born July 7, 1941 in Decize, Billout grew up in Nevers, a small town in the center of France where he received a conventional education. His father, René George was a journalist and his mother, Christiane, a bookseller. No one in his family had an artistic background. In the 1950s, he studied advertising at the Ecole des Arts Appliqués of Beaune, in the Burgundy region. In 1962, Billout moved to Paris and worked for the advertising agency Publicis as a designer until 1966. From 1966 until 1968 he worked at the advertising agency, Thibaud-Lintas. In 1969 the artist moved to New York City and begin a career as a full time illustrator.

=== Artistic influences ===
Billout's influences include Belgian comics artist Hergé (1907–1983) for the detail of the works in The Adventures of Tintin, French poster artist Raymond Savignac (1907–2002), French-Hungarian cartoonist André François (1915–2005), and British illustrator Ronald Searle (1920–2011).

== Illustration career ==
=== Early career ===
In 1969, new to the United States and inexperienced as a professional illustrator, he showed an illustrated story about a young artist and his obsession with America which used a mix of comic pictures, photographic collage, watercolor, colored pencil and ink to Milton Glaser, the design director of New York magazine at the time. Glaser loved them and published the entire portfolio.

Billout's first assignment came from art director Bob Ciano at Redbook magazine. The assignment consisted of a series of 12 small illustrations based on short stories under the titled Summer Fiction Bonus in the August 1969 issue. Ciano would continue to call on Billout over many years to come as the art director moved on to work at The New York Times, Life, Travel & Leisure, Encyclopedia Britannica, and at other publications.

=== Editorial works ===
In 1982, Judy Garlan from The Atlantic Monthly would offer Billout a bi-monthly full page in the magazine. Billout was given total editorial freedom and the column became an integral part of the magazine’s editorial voice for 24 years. The theme of the feature was to take what seemed to be an ordinary scene from life and introduce an unexpected element. The first drawing in the series appeared in the February 1982 issue and the final in the series appeared in the February 2006 issue. The artist considers this series to be his most significant works. Thanks in part to this regular exposure, he was soon one of the most sought-after illustrators in North America. In 2008, Billout would be brought back to do another series for The Atlantic, which ran under the title Gallery and would run until 2012.

Billout's client list includes The Atlantic, The New York Times, The New Yorker, The Wall Street Journal, The Washington Post, Oprah, Travel & Leisure, Business Week, Fortune, Time, and many others.

=== Books ===
In 1973, Billout's first children's book, Number 24, was reviewed by New York Times Book Review author Selma G. Lanes, who called it "a surreal work, as mysterious as a roomful of René Magritte paintings." His first book contained no text.The New York Times would list it as one of the top ten illustrated children's books of the year. Published under the imprint of Harlin Quist, three editions of the book were issued in the same year it was printed. In 2010 a digitized version for DVD would be released with a musical score, produced by Label Frères and Patrick Couratin, titled Bus 24.

Billout added words to his second book released six years later in 1979, By Camel or by Car: A Look at Transportation. According to Connie Tyrrell in School Library Journal this book featured works "simple nearly to the point of austere yet meticulous in detail, with a bold use of color".

Billout would follow up the following year with his third book, Stone and Steel: A Look at Engineering. Paul Goldberger, writing in The New York Times Book Review, lamented that Billout's failure to incorporate much factual information in his brief text in Stone and Steel would frustrate young readers. Regardless, Billout's Stone and Steel would be listed as one of the top ten pictures books of the year by The New York Times.

Thunderbolt and Rainbow: A Look at Greek Mythology, Billout's fourth book released in 1981 depicts a modern-day Manhattan inhabited by the gods of the ancient Greeks. "The writing is swift and unfailingly interesting," wrote a critic for Publishers Weekly. The New York Times review commented that "Thunderbolt & Rainbow convinces us that the Greek gods and goddesses have indeed taken up residence in Manhattan, and that like so many other immigrants they feel perfectly at home."Thunderbolt and Rainbow would be selected by the American Institute of Graphic Arts for recognition.

In Squid and Spider: A Look at the Animal Kingdom, released in 1982, Billout singles out thirteen animals and places them "in unusual situations or habitats that will get observant readers giggling, thinking, or both," reported Ilene Cooper in Booklist. The New York Times would list Squid and Spider on the Ten Best Illustrated Books selection for that year.

More than ten years would pass after the publication of Squid and Spider before Billout's sixth book The Journey: Travel Diary of a Daydreamer in 1993. Writing for School Library Journal, Susan Scheps wrote the book works best as "a collection of unusual illustrations that could provide inspiration for creative writers or daydreamers of all ages."

Something's Not Quite Right, published in 2002, challenges readers to find the out-of-place element in each illustration, with the contrary detail sometimes being the picture's single-word description itself.

In The Frog Who Wanted to See the Sea, released in 2007, monumental landscapes dwarf the main character Alice, a little green frog. Writing for The New York Times, Bruce Handy commented "it’s lovely, with folk tale overtones and illustrations kids and adults can lose themselves in." The Frog Who Wanted to See the Sea was listed as one of the top ten picture books by The New York Times for 2007.

== Notable works ==
=== The Atlantic ===
A limited archive of the artist's work, commissioned by the publication between 1997 and 2007, is stored by The Atlantic.

=== Award-winning works ===
- Gold Medal, Society of Illustrators
- The Frog Who Wanted to See the Sea, Silver Medal, Society of Illustrators
- American Illustration 34, 2014
- Society of Publication Designers Distinctive Merit, 2008, for The New Yorker with art director Chris Curry

=== The Smithsonian Portrait Gallery ===
The Smithsonian holds seven works by Billout from the years 1980 through 1986, all gifts from Time magazine

- Sorry America, Your Insurance Has Been Cancelled, 1986
- Accusing the Press, 1984
- America's Upbeat Mood, 1984
- U.S. Immigration: Stemming the Tide, 1982
- The President's Men, 1981
- Why Italy Works, 1981
- Help! Teachers Can't Teach, 1980

== Bibliography ==
Billout authored a dozen books, five of them chosen by The New York Times as one of that particular year's Ten-Best Illustrated Children’s Books.

- The Frog Who Wanted to See the Sea, published by Creative Editions, 2007
- Something's Not Quite Right published by David R. Godine, 2002
- Question of Detail, published by Harlin Quist (Paris, France), 1998
- Journey: Travel Diary of a Daydreamer, published by Creative Editions,1993
- Squid & Spider: A Look at the Animal Kingdom, published by Prentice Hall, 1982
- Thunderbolt and Rainbow: A Look at Greek Mythology, published by Prentice Hall, 1981
- Bus 24, published by Harlin Quist,1998
- Stone and Steel: A Look at Engineering, published by Prentice-Hall, 1980
- By Camel or by Car: A Look at Transportation, published by Prentice-Hall, 1979
- Number 24, published by Harlin Quist, 1973 Number 24

== Exhibitions ==
=== Solo ===
- Des Equilibres at Galerie Petits Papiers Gallery, 2012, sixty works between 1987 and 2012
- University of Massachusetts, 2006

== Awards ==
Billout won the Hamilton King Award in 1989 and was inducted into the Society of Illustrators Hall of Fame in 2016.

- Silver Medal, Society of Illustrators, 2007 for The Frog Who Wanted to See The Sea, for Creative Editions, art director by Rita Marshall
- Gold Medal, Society of Illustrators, 1982 for Squid and Spider: A Look at the Animal Kingdom
- Gold Medal for Prop, for The Atlantic Monthly Magazine, art directed by Judy Garlan, Society of Illustrators 1988
- Silver Medal, Society of Illustrators, 1985
- Silver Medal, Society of Illustrators, 1987
- 2 Gold Medals, Society of Illustrators, 1974

== Educator ==
- Teacher at Parsons School of Design in New York since 1985

== Working process ==
=== Technique ===
Early illustrations by the artist were done with watercolors and brush and later in his career Billout began using an airbrush. Many years later, he gradually adopted Photoshop. Rough drafts are made on copy paper using a Pilot Razor Point Pen. When finishing a work using Photoshop, the artist scans the drawing and the final color is applied.

=== Attention to detail ===
The work of Billout is founded in strict attention to the details of the subject matter he is addressing. The artist goes to enormous lengths, visiting a site, photographing details, obtaining documents on the subject in order to obtain exacting representations of what is being portrayed.
