= Walter Herdeg =

Swiss graphic designer (1908–1995)

- Walter Herdeg 1908–1995
- Born: January 3, 1908; Zurich
- Died: 1995 (aged 86–87)
- Education: Kunstgewerbeschule, Zürich
- Known for: Graphic design
- Awards: AIGA Award.

Walter Herdeg (January 3, 1908 – 1995) was a Swiss graphic designer, noted for his travel posters and work with Graphis Magazine, who was awarded an AIGA medal in 1986.

== Early life ==
Walter Herdeg was born on January 3, 1908. He was born of a poor family living in the large city Zürich, Switzerland. His passion of visual arts started in his youth. Herdeg's love for art was evident when he drew as a child, and he desired a profession along similar lines, but formal design schools were not to be established until much later and Herdeg feared that his career path would be limited to work as a lithographic drafter in a printing house. He did not pursue his talent until he met Ernst Keller. Keller was a Swiss designer popular for his innovations in photomontage posters in the 1920s. He was also the teacher who was kind enough to offer him a full scholarship at a new design program that had just been established in the Kunstgewerbeschule Zürich, which was also taught by him as the very first instructor. The influence of Keller on Herdeg was a heavy one, and proceeding the launch of his career, it would be seen in his own works. After his graduation from Kunstgewerbeschule, Herdeg went on to continue his studies in 1928 under the guidance of Otto Hermann Werner Hadank (O.H.W Hadank), a leading figure in German package design. Two years later, Hadank would extend to Herdeg the same hospitality as Keller did, by employing him as a calligrapher, package and logo designer. At the end of this ordeal, Herdeg opened his own studio in to do the same work, but this time independently.

== Graphis, Inc. ==
Graphis, Inc was named in Greek; the word meaning writing instrument. The magazine stood apart from the rest of the magazines at the time simply due to the range of art that it featured. The contents of Graphis ranged from designs and illustrations of the various artists featured in the magazine to interviews of the designers themselves. By this, the magazine had become a hub or journal of sorts for artists of all kinds of visual arts. Works featured in the Graphis Magazine were from all over the world as well, since Herdeg strived to bring designers together to create exchange of information between professionals of different origins. The magazine was established a year before the defeat of Nazi Germany during World War II. At the time, Switzerland was not a participant to the war. Despite this condition, business in the country proceeded as usual but with a hint of unease from the fear of sudden attack. Because of this, Switzerland's borders were closed to migration, and the beginning of Graphis saw limited propagation. The magazine still found its way out of the country through the ambassadors who left Switzerland for other countries. At this time the magazine was one of the few that communicated to the western audiences as to what was being done in Europe design wise, and therefore a pioneer at the field of visual communication. The step made by Herdeg in creation of Graphis was a promotion of graphics design culture through the interchange of ideas and techniques, whereby artists with different inclinations could contribute as well as be inspired by others works.

=== Historical influence ===
Sun Poster by Walter Herdeg illustrating Photomontage

Due to the work done by Walter Herdeg on his posters, posters displaying his style of work became more popular. Herdeg had a distinctive system of work in which he used typography with a combination of photography to create unified photo-montage posters that had simple messages with limited wording. The messages were conveyed by the clever use of imaging and brief, sentimental typefaces that were reminiscent of handwriting. Herdeg found this system of work sustainable enough to have used it in several posters for St. Moritz travel posters.

It is apparent that in contemporary poster design, photo-montage was a genre of visual arts popularized in the 1920s and 1930s by Swiss artists and those of Germanic descent as well. One of such was Anton Stankowski who became known for creating photo-montage with Herdeg working among them. These works had extensive O.H.W Hadank's influence as he was a leading instructor at one of the early visual arts schools in Berlin, often titled Kunstgerwerberschule, a German word defining Higher Visual Arts Schools. Hadank's resistance to be taken by the wave of the Modernism movement is as well a testament of his abiding impact on his students. This can be seen in some popular posters by Herdeg for St. Moritz resort. St. Moritz was one of the earlier organizations to apply the concept of corporate identity and branding, before the concept became a trend in the mid 1950s. Meanwhile, Herdeg was at the forefront of this movement, making history unintentionally. According to his testament to the AIGA, "I was heading up a corporate design program without knowing that such a thing existed." This was a project given to him by Dr. Walter Amstutz a manager of the business at the time. The outstanding part of the project was his usage of the sun as a simplified graphic, to bring warmth to cold, snow-covered landscape, the graphic often interacting with other elements on the poster.

=== Notable features ===
Some of the more popular works by Herdeg are travel posters that he designed before the establishment of Graphis Magazine.

Herdeg was not a visual artist only but he was known to have approached design from the perspective of a functionalist in more than a few occasions. This aspect to Herdeg's work is more so notable on the hundred and fifty sixth issue of the magazine, as he dedicated the whole episode to abstracts, forms and functions as can be applied to physical spaces and architecture as well as maps and charts of various uses. As a remark on this 1973 copy of Graphis Magazine, Herdeg commented that:

"The purpose of this book is to show the designer how abstract facts or functions which cannot be simply depicted like natural objects may be given visual expression by suitable graphic transformation. It also reviews the means of visualizing physical and technical processes which are not perceptible to the eye. The optimum synthesis of aesthetics and information value remains the essential objective in every type of diagrammatic presentation..."

This was a hardcover copy featuring a continuation of similar art work from the previous edition. The title was "Graphis Diagrams" and it carried images that would later be used in contemporary product designs such as the Unknown Pleasures compact disc album cover designed by Peter Saville. As testament to Herdeg's curator-ship this and more such visual material featured in his magazine rose to exemplary statuses as well as value.

=== Graphis Magazine management ===
Graphis magazine was kept operational by Herdeg until the later days of his life. Herdeg's style of management at the magazine was hands on, whereby all content each edition was personally overseen by him. It was essentially a personal take on unique ideals on the visual arts industry. Two hundred and forty six editions of the Graphis magazine were personally overseen by Herdeg and completed in his presence. There were also annual editions of the magazine known as Graphis Design Annuals that tracked backwards through the past year to highlight and publish some of the more exemplary works exposed in prior editions.

Herdeg was assisted by people from around the globe whom he trusted such as Steven Heller (design writer) who was a correspondent of Graphis Magazine based in New York. Like the other assistants, Heller would review works of art by other designers and send to Herdeg for approval. According to Heller, his relationship with Herdeg was a professional one that gave way to the business side, either the works reviewed by the correspondents reached the magazine, or were filtered out and the proceeding issues followed suit.

Graphis Magazine is currently in print, in a similar format as it originally began. The management of the magazine after Herdeg has since been passed on to non-family members, specifically to B. Martin Pedersen who after acquiring the Magazine, moved it to New York City in the year 1986. This is where the headquarters of the publication still resides.

The total number of copies that have been produced by the magazine are three hundred and fifty and counting.

== AIGA Award ==
After his self-imposed retirement in 1986 Herdeg won an AIGA medal for the strides he made in the Visual Arts category. Herdeg got interested the pursuit of Magazine publishing when reading the German Design Magazine Gebrauchsgraphik by Professor Walter Frenzel of which he was an avid audience. Gebrauchsgraphik was a commercial purpose magazine that Herdeg was proud to have his work featured in, but he was inspired to create better material. This became a major turning point in his life, when he decided to establish his own design magazine called Graphis. The establishment of this design magazine was a major achievement in Herdeg's career since it served as his legacy and contribution to the design field.

Herdeg was a designer by profession, focused on advertising design. He started in the design field as the culture of design identity was just emerging. Herdeg created his magazine in 1944 to feature a variety of work from typography, paintings, graphic arts and in general visual arts that included inspiration, originality and creativity. After the end of the second world war, Graphis Magazine saw a rise in popularity that made it unofficially the "go-to" magazine for visual artists worldwide. Through the magazine, the unknown designers of Eastern Europe, Soviet Union, Japan, Finland among other lesser known design communities.

== Books ==
- Archigraphia
- Film & TV Graphics
- Film & TV Graphics 2: An International Survey of the art of film animation
- Graphis Diagrams
- Graphis Ephemera
- Graphis Magazine issues
- The Sun In Art
