= Jianping He =

Chinese graphic designer, professor and publisher

Jianping He (born February 26, 1973, in Fuyang District, Hangzhou, China), also known as Jumping He, is a German-Chinese graphic designer, professor and publisher. He lives and works in Berlin.

== Biography ==
Jianping He studied graphic design at the China Academy of Art from 1991 to 1994 and graduated in 1995 with a bachelor's degree. From 1997 to 2001 he studied fine arts under Heinz Jürgen Kristahn at the Berlin University of the Arts, where he received his diploma and became a master student in 2001. In 2011 he did his doctorate in cultural history at the Free University of Berlin.

He taught at the Berlin University of the Arts from 2001 to 2008 and worked as a visiting professor at the Hong Kong Polytechnic University as well as a professor for doctoral students at the China Academy of Art in Hangzhou from 2006 to 2019. In 2002 he founded his design studio hesign based in Berlin. in 2008, he opened a second branch in Hangzhou, China. He was a member of the examinations panel for Master Level diploma at the ESAG Penninghen Art School in Paris. He also acted as a jury member of numerous international competitions, such as the 100 best posters of the year - Germany, Austria, Switzerland, the International Biennale of Theater Poster, Rzeszow, the International Poster Biennale in Warsaw, the International Poster Biennal, Ningbo and the Red Dot Design Award and the DFA Design for Asia Award in Hong Kong. Since 2005 he has been a member of the Alliance Graphique Internationale.

== Exhibitions ==
His exhibitions have taken place in over 50 cities around the world, including Germany, Malaysia, Slovenia, China, Taiwan and Japan.

He's works are collected by Friedrich Ebert Foundation, the Museum of Arts and Crafts Hamburg, Berlin State Museums, German Museum Munich, German Poster Museum - Museum Folkwang, Ogaki Poster Museum Japan, Toyama Prefectural Museum of Art and Design, Stedelijk Museum Amsterdam, Hong Kong Heritage Museum, Chiang Kai-shek Memorial Hall Taiwan, Israel National Museum, Poster Museum Warsaw, Poster Museum Poznan, Lahti Art Museum, Museum of Design Zurich, Bibliothèque nationale de France, Center Georges-Pompidou, Victoria and Albert Museum London, Cooper Hewitt, Smithsonian Design Museum New York and many other institutions.

=== Individual exhibitions ===
- Come back to Asia, 2004, The One Academy, Kuala Lumpur, Malaysia
- 10 Years in Germany, 2006, Grillo Theater, Essen, Germany
- Flashback, 2012, Ginza graphic Gallery, Tokyo, Japan
- In Between, 2012, Emzin Gallery, Ljubljana, Slovenian
- Acquaintance, 2012, NUA Art Museum, Nanjing, China
- 14th Homage to Maestro Morteza Momayez – Solo Exhibition of Jumping He in Tehran, 2019, Momayez Foundation, Tehran, Iran
