= Michel Auer =

Swiss photographer, encyclopediast, and historian (1933–2024)

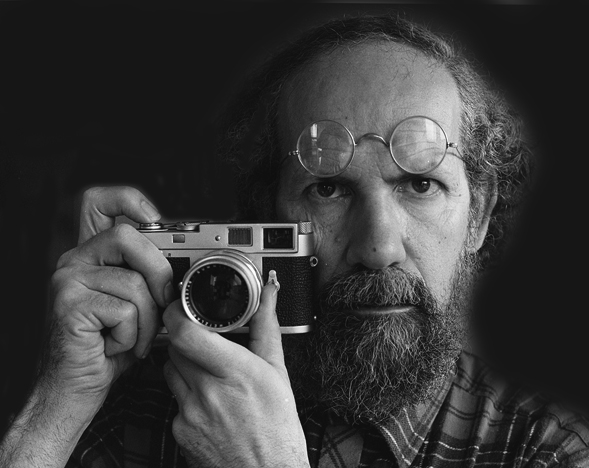
- Self-portrait by Michel Auer, 1985
- Born: 30 May 1933; Zurich, Switzerland
- Died: 22 October 2024 (aged 91); Hermance, Switzerland
- Education: rural education boarding school at Glarisegg Castle, Steckborn
- Occupations: photographer, collector, historian, encyclopedist
- Years active: 1960–2024
- Organization: Fondation Auer Ory
- Known for: Illustrated History of Photographic Cameras; Encyclopedia of International Photographers from 1839 to the Present Day
- Spouses: Françoise Guerin (m. 1955; div. 1968); Michèle Ory (m. 1980)
- Children: Martine, Laurence, Georges Nicéphore
- Parent(s): Victoire (née Frontaid) and Jules Auer
- Awards: 1986 Kraszna-Krausz Award for Encyclopedia of International Photographers from 1839 to the Present Day

Michel (Micha) Auer (30 May 1933 – 22 October 2024) was a Franco-Swiss photographer, lexicographer, encyclopaedist, collector and historian of photography, known for his publications on vintage cameras and a comprehensive encyclopaedia of international photographers.

== Education and training ==
Son of Victoire (née Frontaid) and Jules Auer, Michel was born in Zurich in 1933. After primary school from 1941 to 1945 in Geneva and secondary studies from 1946 to 1951 in the rural education boarding school at Glarisegg Castle near Steckborn in German-speaking Switzerland, he was apprenticed as an advertising photographer in Zurich.

After his recruit training in the Swiss military service in 1954, Auer started an advertising studio in Geneva in 1955. He married Françoise Guerin, whom he divorced in 1968 after having three children together (Martine, Laurence and Georges Nicéphore).

In 1958, he obtained a federal diploma in photography (the Swiss tertiary-level diploma awarded for expert skills and enabling the holder to run a company and to train apprentices).

== Collector ==
In 1960, Auer founded and until 1975, managed, the 'Big' laboratory in Geneva specialising in oversize enlargements in black-and-white and colour. In 1961, abandoning advertising photography, Auer devoted himself to the collection of cameras and the writing of various books on the subject and making several trips to America in the 1970s. In 1971 in Vevey was staged a survey of the history of photography around Auer's collection, and that inspired the establishment of the Swiss Camera Museum.

In 1976 with another collector, Michèle Ory, at the Clignancourt flea market in Paris, they operated a stall specialising in cameras and photographs. They lived nearby, but later in life returned to live in Switzerland in the rue du Couchant in Hermance where they housed their collection.

In fact, Auer possessed at least three different collections of cameras. In 1973, Auer's first was sold to the Provinciaal Museum voor Fotografie in Antwerp (now Fotomuseum Antwerp), supplemented since by other collections including that of Agfa-Gevaert. In the early 1990s, the JCII Camera Museum in Tokyo added to its holdings of Japanese products examples of Western cameras purchased from Auer. Auer's personal collection of rare and significant cameras is kept at the Auer-Ory Foundation.

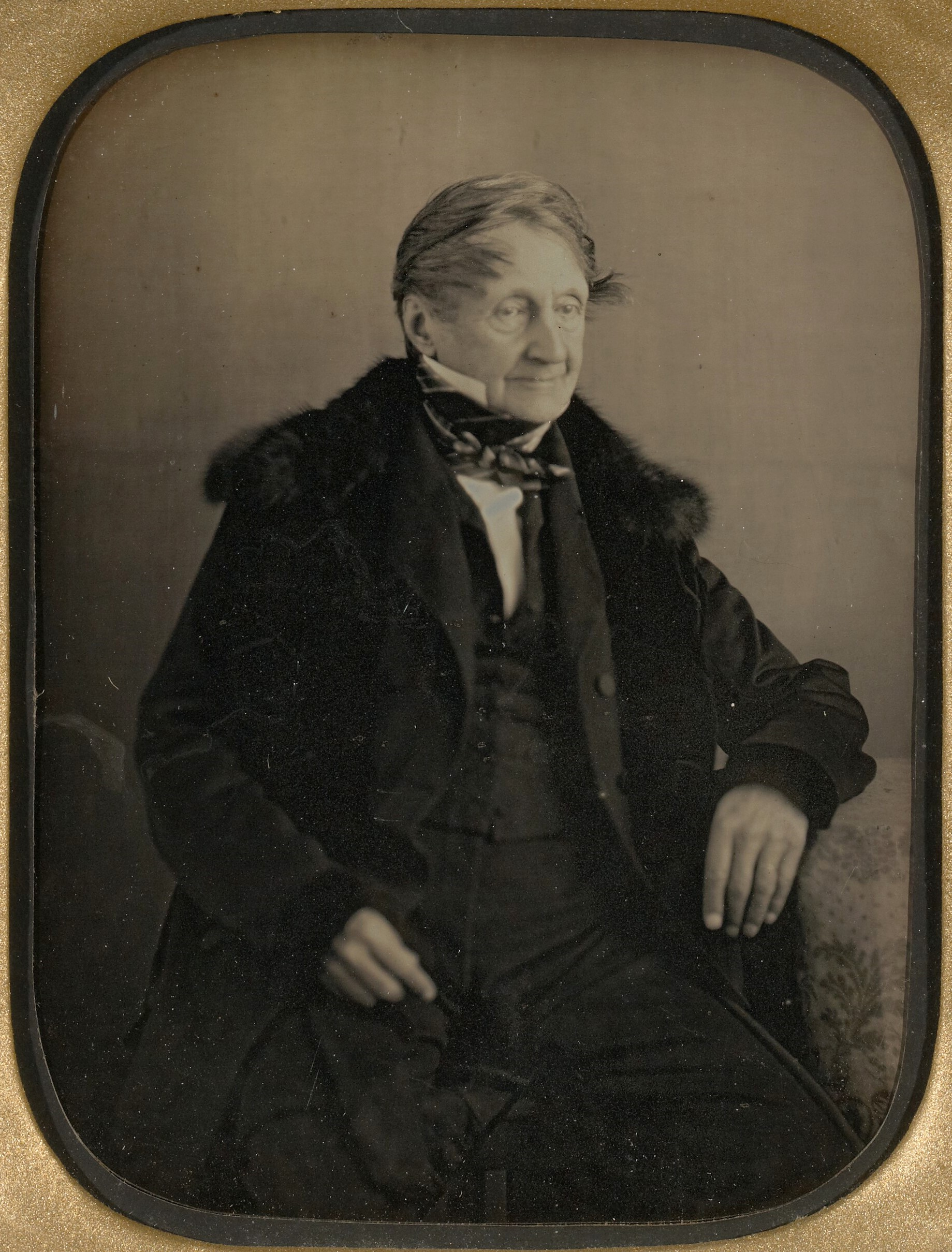
Jean-Gabriel Eynard (c. 1851) Self-portrait. Daguerreotype 12.1 × 8.6 cm (4 3/4 × 3 3/8 in.) Getty Museum

Amongst photographs sold to museums, the J. Paul Getty Museum has eighty-nine vintage daguerreotypes, the majority by Jean-Gabriel Eynard, purchased in the 1980s from Michel and Michèle Auer.

== Historian ==
Auer's Illustrated History of the Camera: From 1830 to the Present was widely reviewed, and frequently cited. Michael McNay in The Guardian welcomed it as "a detailed exposition of the development of the techniques of photography"; Judith Hoffberg noted that "since camera technology changes constantly, the book becomes a historical, visual survey of a machine which has changed the world..." and considered that the only comparable book was A Century of Cameras (1973) by Eaton S. Lothrop Jr. which she regarded as "a less sumptuous work that is limited to the cameras in the George Eastman House". Auer was to collaborate with Lothrop on The Invisible Eye: Espionage Cameras (1978).

Auer became accepted as a world authority on historic cameras, presenting, for example, in October 1985 at a symposium for the Photographic Historical Society at George Eastman House in Rochester, New York.

== Encyclopaedia ==
Auer married Michèle Ory in 1980 and with her published in 1985 the Encyclopédie internationale des photographes de 1839 à nos jours (Photographers Encyclopaedia International 1839 to the Present) a two-volume set that includes biographies of 1,600 photographers in French and English. In 1997, the encyclopaedia was updated and published on a CD-ROM to include entries, as noted by reviewer Peter Blank, on "3,135 individuals and less-complete information on an additional 3,000, from seventy-one different nationalities," in a format that he considered "visually pleasing and well organized". However, historian of 19th-century photography Larry Schaaf in reviewing the CD-ROM version found some errors of fact and others made in translation from the French, but considered that despite them "one can only admire and encourage the effort made by the Auers to make the mass of information they have gathered accessible to the public."

== Foundation ==
In March 2009, the couple created the Fondation Auer Ory through which they exhibited their collection of more than 10,000 photographs as well as objects related to photography. In addition to the generally single-artist exhibitions held in their foundation, they initiated numerous off-site showings of their collections which cover aspects of photography since its beginnings.

Loans from the collection, of works by photographers as diverse as Nadar, Weegee and 19th-century Swiss-French pioneers, were made to curators of exhibitions such as:

- Roland Leboye for New York, Weegee the Famous at Le Pavillon Populaire, Montpellier, from 15 September 2008 (281 original large-format prints of the 1930s–1960s, including the Coney Island series (1940) and Heatspell of 23 May 1941)
- Michel Bépoix for Nadar: Michel and Michèle Auer collection, at the Art Gallery of the General Council of Bouches-du-Rhône (2001)
- Alexandre Fiette directing the Maison Tavel in Geneva, 27 November 2019 – 29 March 2020, a body of work related to French-speaking Switzerland that they had been building since the early 1960s.

Known also for their foundation's collection of photographers' books, Auer presented in a session with Gerry Badger at the Vienna PhotoBook Festival in 2015.

== Death ==
Michel Auer died in October 2024 at the age of 91.

== Books ==
- Auer, Michel; Tubbs, D. B. (1975). The Illustrated History of the Camera from 1839 to the Present (1st ed.). Boston: New York Graphic Society. ISBN 9780821206836. OCLC 2212746.
- Auer, Michel; Lothrop, Eaton S. (1978). L'Oeil invisible: les appareils photographiques d'espionnage [The Invisible Eye: Spy Cameras] (in French) (1st (French) ed.). Paris: Éditions EPA. ISBN 9782851200686. OCLC 6145330.
- Auer, Michel; Ory, Michèle (1979). Histoire de la caméra ciné amateur [History of the amateur movie camera] (in French). Les Editions de l'Amateur. ISBN 9782859170110. OCLC 8480067.
- Auer, Michèle; Auer, Michel (1985). Encyclopédie internationale des photographes de 1839 à nos jours = Photographers encyclopaedia international 1839 to the present (in French and English). Hermance, Switzerland: Editions Camera obscura. ISBN 9782903671044. OCLC 12635510.
- Auer, Michel (1993). Guide Michel Auer: index et prix pour plus de 7000 appareils 1993–1995 [Michel Auer guide: index and prices for over 7000 cameras : 1993–1995] (in French) (1993–1995 ed.). Editions Camera Obscur. ISBN 9782903671112.
- Auer, Michèle; Auer, Michel (2007). Photo books: 802 books from the M.+M. Auer Collection. Hermance, Switzerland: Editions M. + M. ISBN 9782970057406. OCLC 1152235816.

== Exhibitions from the Auer collections ==
- 2001, 5 July – 30 September: Nadar: Michel and Michèle Auer collection, Art Gallery of the General Council of Bouches-du-Rhône, Aix-en-Provence.
- 2004, 13 January – 14 March: Collection M. + M. Auer: a history of photography, Théâtre de la photographie, Nice, then April 22 – September 12, 2004: Museum of Art and History, Geneva.

== Personal exhibitions ==
- 2005, 1 October – 5 March 2006: Micha Auer photographer, Camera Museum, Vevey, Switzerland
- 2007, 10 January – 4 March: Micha Auer, Photographs in front of the camera, Maison Européenne Photo, Paris
