= Jonathan Knowles =

British biomaterials scientist

Jonathan C. Knowles FREng
- Education: Staffordshire University; University of Siena
- Known for: Research on biomaterials, tissue engineering, and regenerative medicine
- Scientific career
- Fields: Biomaterials science Biomedical engineering
- Workplaces: University College London

Jonathan Campbell Knowles is a British biomaterials scientist and academic who is Professor of Biomaterials Science at University College London (UCL). He is known for his research on biomaterials for tissue engineering and regenerative medicine, particularly degradable glass and ceramic systems for clinical applications.

== Education ==
Knowles obtained a Bachelor of Science (Honours) degree from Staffordshire University in 1987. He subsequently completed postgraduate studies including a diploma at the University of Siena and a PhD at Staffordshire University in 1990.

== Career ==
Knowles joined University College London in 2000 as a Reader in Biomaterials at the Eastman Dental Institute. He was promoted to Professor of Biomaterials Science in 2003.

At UCL, he has been associated with the Division of Biomaterials and Tissue Engineering, contributing to research and teaching in biomedical materials and their clinical applications.

He has also held international academic appointments, including a visiting professorship at Dankook University in South Korea.

== Research ==
Knowles's research focuses on the development and characterisation of biomaterials for hard and soft tissue repair. His work has included:

- Phosphate-based glasses for biomedical applications
- Degradable and bioactive ceramics for bone regeneration
- Materials for dental restoration and drug delivery systems

His research has contributed to advances in tissue engineering and regenerative medicine and has led to the development of materials used in clinical and translational applications.

Knowles has published extensively in the field of biomaterials. As of May 2026 he has an h-index of 108, and has been an author for 438 publications which have at least 10 citations by other researchers.

== Honours and awards ==
- Fellow of the Royal Academy of Engineering (RAEng)
- Fellow of the American Institute for Medical and Biological Engineering (AIMBE)

== Research leadership ==
Knowles has led and contributed to collaborative research initiatives in biomaterials and regenerative medicine, including international programmes and centres focused on precision medicine and translational healthcare innovation.

== Selected publications ==
- Knowles, J.C. (2003). "Phosphate glasses for biomedical applications". Journal of Materials Chemistry.
- Abou Neel, E.A.; Bozec, L.; Knowles, J.C. et al. (2013). "Collagen—emerging collagen based therapies hit the patient". Advanced Drug Delivery Reviews.
- Owens, G.J.; Singh, R.K.; Foroutan, F.; Knowles, J.C. et al. (2016). "Sol–gel based materials for biomedical applications". Progress in Materials Science.
