= Bailey Lauerman =

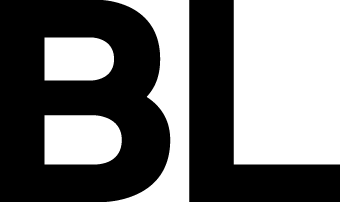
- Type: Privately Held
- Industry: Advertising / Communications
- Founded: 1970; 56 years ago
- Founders: Rich Bailey & Bart Lewis
- Headquarters: Omaha, NE, U.S.
- Key people: Greg Andersen (Chief Executive Officer); Carter Weitz (Chairman, Chief Creative Officer)
- Number of employees: ≈40
- Website: BaileyLauerman.com

Bailey Lauerman is an independent advertising agency headquartered in Omaha, Nebraska. The agency has earned recognition for its work with national brands including Disney, Union Pacific, Panda Express, and Phillips 66 Lubricants. The agency is a member of the Advertising and Marketing International Network (AMIN), as well as the American Association of Advertising Agencies (4A's).

== History ==
In 1965, the basis for the agency known today as Bailey Lauerman was a small magazine-sized visitor's guide called Around Town, with advertisements written and designed by Rich Bailey and Bart Lewis. The partners founded the agency as Bailey Lewis & Associates in 1970. With primarily local clients, the agency experienced slow but steady growth in the decade after its founding. When Lewis retired and moved to Texas, Jim Lauerman succeeded him as president and the agency name was changed to Bailey Lauerman in 1990.

In 2001, the agency expanded to a second office in downtown Omaha to accommodate additional clients and a growing workforce. After 37 years at the agency, founder Rich Bailey retired in 2007.

In 2012, the agency hired Andy Fletcher to take on the role of CEO as Jim Lauerman approached retirement. Lauerman remains on the agency's board of directors. The agency moved its corporate headquarters to Omaha in January 2013.

In 2016, Nebraska-native Greg Andersen was named chief executive officer.
