= British Journal of Photography =

Photography magazine

- Cover of issue 7917 (January–March 2024)
- Categories: Photography
- Frequency: Monthly
- Publisher: 1854 Media
- First issue: 1854
- Country: United Kingdom
- Website: British Journal of Photography
- ISSN: 0007-1196

The British Journal of Photography (BJP) is a magazine about photography, published by 1854 Media. It includes in-depth articles, profiles of photographers, analyses, and technological reviews.

== History ==
The magazine was established in Liverpool as the Liverpool Photographic Journal in 1854 with its first issue appearing on 14 January 1854, making it the United Kingdom's second oldest photographic title after the Photographic Journal. It was printed monthly until 1857 when it became the Liverpool and Manchester Photographic Journal, published bi-weekly, then the Photographic Journal from 1859 to 1860, when it obtained its present name. The magazine moved to London in 1864, first to Covent Garden; then in 2007 to Soho; and in 2013 to Shoreditch; then in 2017 to East India Dock. It was published weekly from 1864 to March 2010, then reverted to its original monthly period. It is now also available as an electronic magazine, online and in iPad and iPhone formats.

In 2013, Incisive Media sold the British Journal of Photography to its publishing director, who formed Apptitude Media. In 2017 Apptitude Media was rebranded as 1854 Media.

In 2022 Marc Hartog left as owner, CEO and chairman of 1854 Media, and the magazine's Creative Director Mick Moore took over as CEO.

On 19 October 2026, BJP announced that it was pausing print publication and would be published in digital form only "for the time being". In a letter posted on its Facebook page, chief executive and creative director Mick Moore attributed the decision to rising printing and delivery costs and said the publisher intended to return to print.

== Editors ==
The following persons have been editor-in-chief of the magazine:

=== Liverpool Photographic Journal ===
- 1854–55: Charles Corey
- 1855–56: Frank Howard
- 1857–58: G. R. Berry

=== Liverpool & Manchester Photographic Journal ===
- January 1858 – May 1858: William Crookes
- June 1857 – February 1858: T. A. Malone

=== Liverpool & Manchester Photographic Journal, Photographic Journal and British Journal of Photography ===
- March 1858–June 1864: George Shadbolt

=== British Journal of Photography ===
- July 1864 – December 1878: J. Traill Taylor and others
- January 1879 – December 1885: W. B. Bolton
- January 1886 – November 1895: James Traill Taylor
- November 1895 – ?: Thomas Bedding
- 1911: George E. Brown
- 1937–67: Arthur James Dalladay
- 1967–87: Geoffrey Crawley
- 1987–92: Chris Dickie (Christopher Gordon Dickie, 26 September 1951 – 8 June 2011)
- 1993–99: Reuel Golden
- 1999–2000: Chris Dickie
- 2000 – August 2003: John Tarrant
- August 2003 – September 2003: Chris Dickie
- October 2003 – August 2020: Simon Bainbridge
- December 2020 – present: Izabela Radwanska Zhang

== Awards organised by BJP ==
=== Female in Focus ===
2019 Winners: Nancy Newberry, Sarah Pannell, Gwendolyn Keasberry, Charlotte Bergan, Sarah Blais, Fern Berresford

2020 Winners: Dimpy Bhalotia, Kasia Trojak, Ana Nance, Carmen Daneshmandi, Yuet Yee Wong, Nicole Benewaah Gehle,

=== International Photography Award ===
The International Photography Award (IPA) is one of the most prestigious annual accolades organized by BJP. It is designed to find and showcase the best contemporary talent in photography. Winners typically receive a solo exhibition at a leading London gallery, a grant to help fund their future projects, and extensive coverage across BJP's print and digital platforms. Recent winners include artists who have gone on to achieve significant international acclaim, such as Felicity Hammond and Edgar Martins.

=== Breakthrough ===
Breakthrough is an award dedicated specifically to students and recent graduates (within five years of graduation). The award aims to bridge the gap between education and a professional career. It recognizes outstanding work across two categories: Undergraduate and Postgraduate. Winners and shortlisted photographers have their work exhibited as part of a group show and published in a special edition of the British Journal of Photography, providing crucial exposure at the start of their careers.

== Portrait of Britain ==
Portrait of Britain is an annual British pay-to-enter portrait photography competition run by the British Journal of Photography. Its subject is the diversity of British people. The 100 winning portraits are displayed on JCDecaux's digital screens across Britain throughout September. It launched in 2016.
