= Gottschalk+Ash Int'l =

Gottschalk + Ash Int'l
- Industry: Design
- Founded: 1966
- Founder: Fritz Gottschalk; Stuart Ash
- Headquarters: Zürich, Switzerland
- Website: www.ga-z.com

Gottschalk+Ash International is a graphic design, environmental design and branding firm founded in Montreal, Canada in 1966 by Swiss designer Fritz Gottschalk and Canadian designer Stuart Ash. Offices were later opened in Toronto, New York and Zürich. The firm’s work includes wayfinding for the Toronto PATH, the Soleil Swiss standard poster display, and the Swiss passport (1985 edition). The Canadian office was sold in 2007, and the Swiss office still operates from Zürich.

== History ==
The Swiss-born Gottschalk moved to Canada in 1963 and worked at graphic design office Paul Arthur + Associates in Ottawa. In 1965 he left Paul Arthur + Associates to establish his own office in Montreal. Stuart Ash, who had also been working at Paul Arthur + Associates, joined him in 1966, together founding Gottschalk + Ash following collaboration on a project for the Montreal Museum of Fine Arts.

Gottschalk+Ash opened a Toronto office in 1972 when Stuart Ash relocated there. A New York office was opened in 1976 with Ken Carbone, subsequently including Leslie Smolan and later becoming the Carbone Smolan Agency. Fritz Gottschalk returned to Switzerland in 1979 and opened a G+A office in Zürich.

Stuart Ash retired in 2007, and the Canadian arm of the firm was sold.

Both Fritz Gottschalk and Stuart Ash are members of Alliance Graphique Internationale (AGI), a membership-by-nomination association of graphic designers and artists.

=== Current status ===
The Zürich office, known as Gottschalk + Ash Int'l AG, continues to operate independently, led by Sascha Lötscher and Mattia Conconi.

== Design philosophy ==
Gottschalk brought design influences from Swiss Style and International Typographic Style from his training in Switzerland to his work in Canada. G+A combined this with Ash’s North American design background. In an interview with TM Research Archive, online repository of the Swiss graphic design journal Typographische Monatsblätter, Gottschalk said, "I never wanted to do cold Swiss design. My idea always was to go beyond that, take the best from Europe – from Switzerland – and accept the best of the New World, with its freewheeling let’s-try-it attitude."

== Selected projects ==
The work of G+A includes branding, corporate communications and environmental design, as well as establishing standards for the presentation of outdoor advertising.

Three G+A posters from 1979, 2007 and 2024 are part of the Museum für Gestaltung Zürich's collection.

=== Soleil poster display system ===
In 1989 G+A developed the Soleil poster display system for APG, which became the standard for Swiss outdoor poster displays in 1992. The system consists of metal mounting plates sandwiching a t-shaped holding frame with legs, suitable for the display of posters in public space. It is still used today as the standard display throughout Switzerland, including as the official municipal standard for the city of Zürich.

=== 1985 Swiss passport ===
The G+A design for the 1985 edition of the Swiss passport, issued until 2002, consists of a white Swiss cross on a bright red cover and pages with topographic and crystalline forms rendered in brown and green fine line-work. Phaidon's Archive of Graphic Design noted that it "has a sophisticated elegance that stands out against the more pedestrian offerings of other nations."
