= Twen =

German arts magazine (1959–1971)

twen
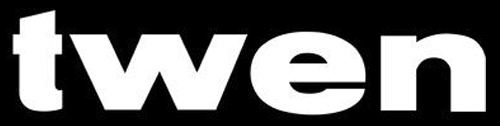
- Art director: Willy Fleckhaus
- Photographer: Christa Peters
- Frequency: Monthly
- Publisher: Kindler & Schiermeyer
- Founder: Hans A. Nikel; Hans Hermann
- First issue: 1959; 67 years ago
- Final issue: 1971; 55 years ago
- Country: West Germany
- Language: German
- ZDB: 43179-5

Twen, stylised as twen, was a West German magazine that was published from 1959 to 1971, and known for its innovative design and typography.

== History and profile ==
Twen was launched in 1959 as a bimonthly magazine and the first issue appeared in April 1959. The founders were Hans A. Nikel and Hans Hermann. However, there is another report citing the founders as Adolf Theobald and Stephen Wolf.

In September 1961, the magazine became a monthly publication. Willy Fleckhaus was Twen's art director throughout its existence. Notable photographers included Christa Peters.

Twen was pitched at "people in their twenties, from 15 to 30", thus its name, Twen. It was read in both West and East Germany. The magazine folded with the June 1971 issue.
