= Arthur James Dalladay =

Arthur James Dalladay was born in December 1894 in West Ham in Essex in England. He died in 1989 in Gravesend, Kent. Dalladay was the editor of the "British Journal Photographic Almanac & Photographer's Daily Companion" for 30 years from 1936 to 1966.

He built the very first photographic spot meter in about 1935; he described it in the BJP Almanac of 1937 on pages 127-138. This meter still exists, in the possession of a subsequent editor of the Journal. Within a decade or so, there appeared two commercial meters based on the same principle.

== Publications ==
- The British Journal Photographic Almanac and Photographers' Daily Companion. Published by Henry Greenwood, London, 1953.
