= Willy Fleckhaus =

German designer and art director

Wilhelm August Fleckhaus (21 December 1925 – 12 September 1983) was a German designer and art director, perhaps best known as art director of Twen magazine throughout its 1959 to 1970 existence. He was a prolific designer of book covers.

Fleckhaus was born in 1925 in Velbert, Germany.

He died of a heart attack at his home in Tuscany, Italy on 12 September 1983.

== Exhibitions ==
- 2016: Willy Fleckhaus Design, Revolte, Regenbogen; Museum für Angewandte Kunst Köln (in Cooperation with Museum Villa Stuck, Munich).
- 2017: Willy Fleckhaus Design, Revolte, Regenbogen im Museum für Kunst und Gewerbe in Hamburg.
- 2017: Willy Fleckhaus Design, Revolte, Regenbogen; Museum Villa Stuck, Munich.

== Bibliography ==
- Fleckhaus - Design, Revolt, Rainbow. Ed. Michael Buhrs, Petra Hesse, text (german/english) by Hans-Michael Koetzle, Carsten Wolff. Hartmann Books, Stuttgart 2017, ISBN 978-3-96070-012-8.
- twen – Revision einer Legende. Ed. by Hans-Michael Koetzle (only german), Klinkhardt&Biermann, 1995, ISBN 978-3781403925.
- Michael Koetzle, Carsten M. Wolff (Ed.): Fleckhaus. Deutschlands erster Art Director, (only german). Klinkhardt & Biermann, 1997, ISBN 978-3781404052.
