= DCA Design =

English product design and development consultancy company

DCA Design International Ltd
- Industry: Product Design
- Founded: 1960
- Founder: David Carter
- Headquarters: Warwick, United Kingdom
- Services: Product Design and Development; Consulting
- Number of employees: 130
- Website: www.dca-design.com

DCA Design International is a product design and development company based in Warwick, England. The company was founded in 1960 and now employs more than 130 people.

== History ==
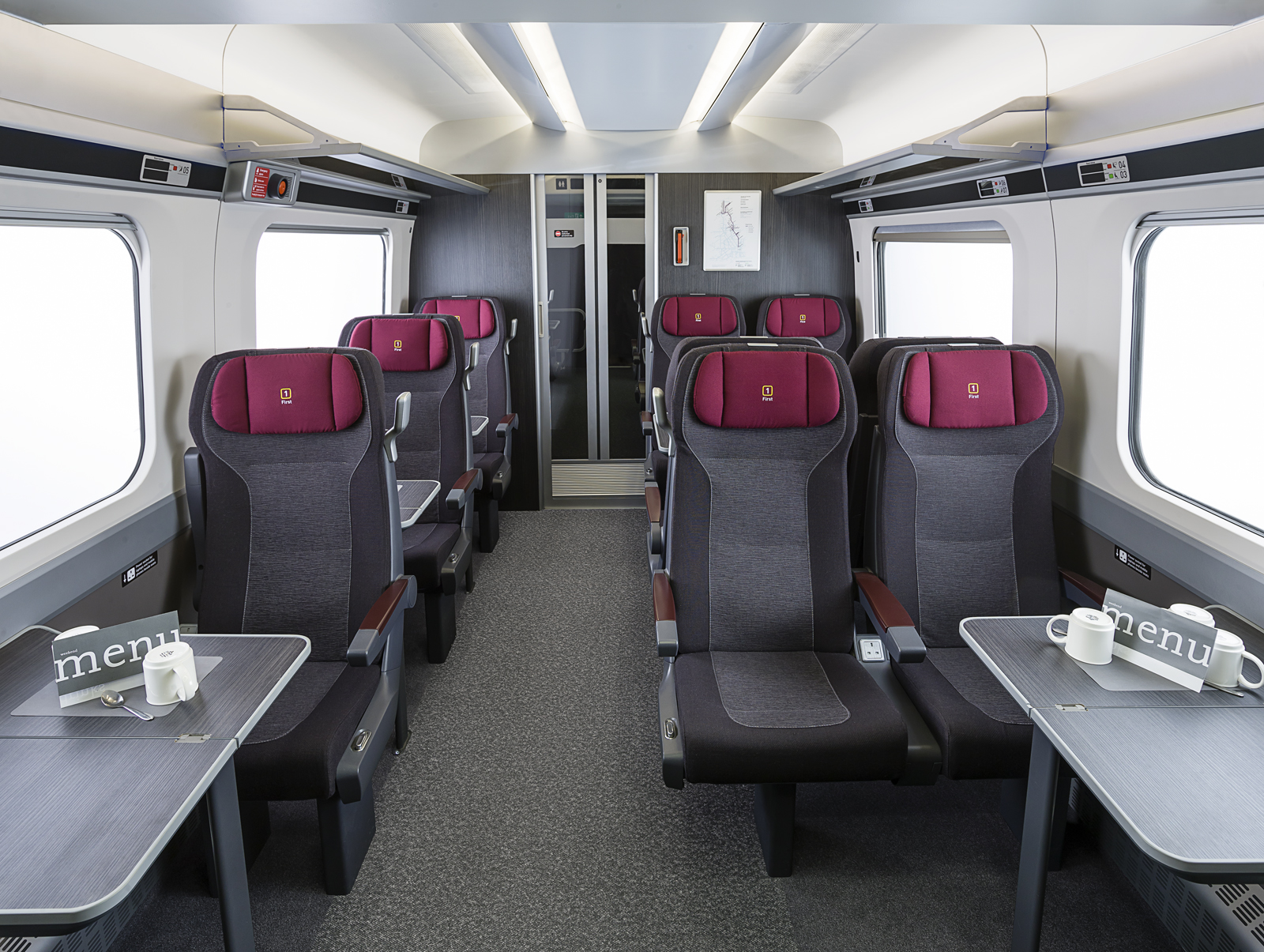
Design for Hitachi Class 800

Founded in 1960 by David Carter RDI CBE, David Carter Associates grew throughout the 1960s and 1970s, becoming DCA Design Consultants in 1975 and later renamed itself DCA Design International Ltd in 1986. It is still operating out of its historical home of Church Street, Warwick in the UK, having now grown to four sites within the town.

DCA employs over 130 staff across various disciplines, including industrial design, mechanical, electronics, and software engineering, interaction design, design research, and strategy.

== Work and awards ==
DCA works across many market sectors including Consumer, Medical/Scientific, Industrial/Commercial and Transport. DCA worked extensively on rolling stock for both British Rail and London Underground throughout the 1980s and in 1985 began working on the "Le Shuttle" locomotive for the Channel Tunnel between Britain and France.

More recently DCA with pharmaceutical company Sanofi-Aventis have designed SoloStar, a disposable pen-type injector for insulin. This device took Gold, International Export and Grand Prix at the 2009 DBA Design Effectiveness Awards in recognition of its improved performance compared to competitor pens and its significant commercial success, as in 2008 it had accounted for 41% of all growth in the global injectable insulin market.

DCA have won various other design industry awards with their clients, for a variety of products. For example, the 3M Versaflo S655 Premium Hood (a protective respirator) won a 2010 Red Dot Award for Product Design within the industry and Crafts category. This was followed up the following year by the 3M Versaflo M-Series headgear (a range of powered and supplied air respiratory protection systems) which won a 2011 Red Dot Award in the industry and Crafts category. Meanwhile, the TR-300 "Turbo Pack" which powers both the S and M Series headsets achieved an Honourable Mention also in the 2011 Red Dot Awards. The M-Series also won an IDEA Bronze Commercial Award from the Industrial Designers Society of America (IDSA) in 2011.

Other recent awards have included a 2010 Good Design Award for the GBC QuickStart Laminator and a 2009 Good Design Award for Sanofi Aventis’ ClikStar reusable insulin injection pen.

== Services ==
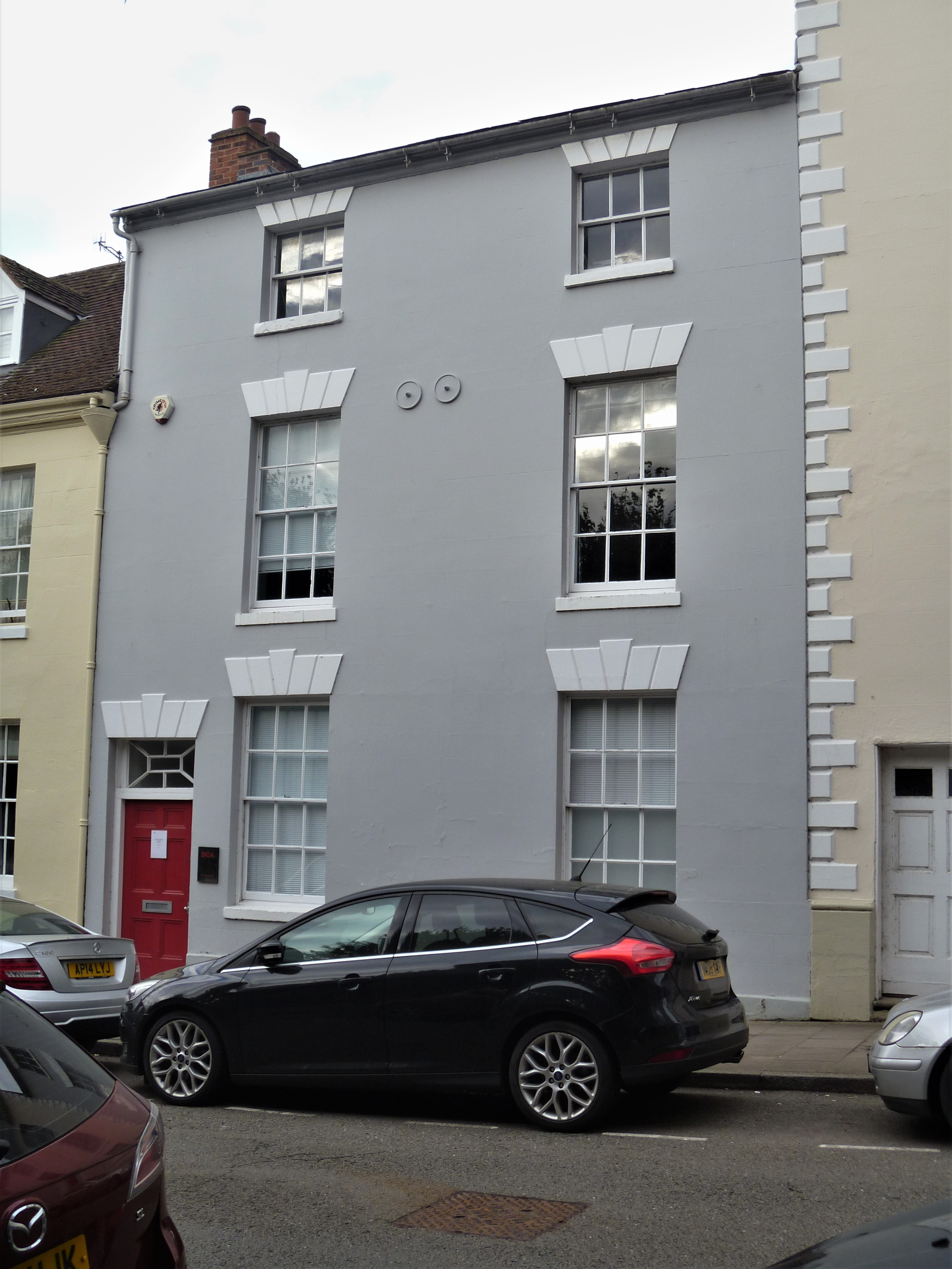
Registered office in Warwick

- Systems Engineering
- Insight & Strategy
- Mechanical Engineering
- Industrial Design
- Digital UX/UI
- Human Factors
- Electronics
- Software
- Prototyping
