= Etzdorf =

Etzdorf is a German surname, often used with the nobiliary particle "von". Notable people with the surname include:

- Georgina von Etzdorf (born 1955), British textile designer
- Marga von Etzdorf (1907–1933), German aviator
