= ISPO =

ISPO is the Shortcut for:

- Internationale Fachmesse für Sportartikel und Sportmode
- International Simultaneous Policy Organization
- International Society for Prosthetics and Orthotics
