= Margaret Howell =

British fashion designer

Margaret Howell CBE, RDI
- Born: September 5, 1946 (age 79); Tadworth, Surrey, England
- Education: Goldsmiths College
- Occupation: fashion designer
- Spouse: Paul Renshaw (divorced)

Margaret Howell CBE, RDI (born 5 September 1946, in Tadworth, Surrey, England) is a British fashion designer. Her career, in both men's and women's wear, spans over five decades.

== Early career ==
“I had always made my own clothes, so the enjoyment of choosing the fabric and adapting the pattern to what I wanted was my training. [But] The 4 Year Dip Ad course [in Art and Design at Goldsmiths College, London] was an invaluable training in colour, proportion and design." Graduating in 1969, Howell made accessories while job-hunting. In 1970 her hand-made beads were taken up by Vogue and, spotted in the window of Browns, led to a commission by costume designer Beatrice Dawson for a beaded vest for Elizabeth Taylor, then shooting 'Zee and Co' in London.

In 1972 Howell began to design, make and sell shirts from a flat in Blackheath, south-east London, and was soon encouraged by orders from Joseph in London as well as US retailers, including Tommy Perse, Alan Bilzerian and Howard Partman. With Joseph's support a Margaret Howell franchise shop opened on South Molton Street, London in 1976.

== Growth ==
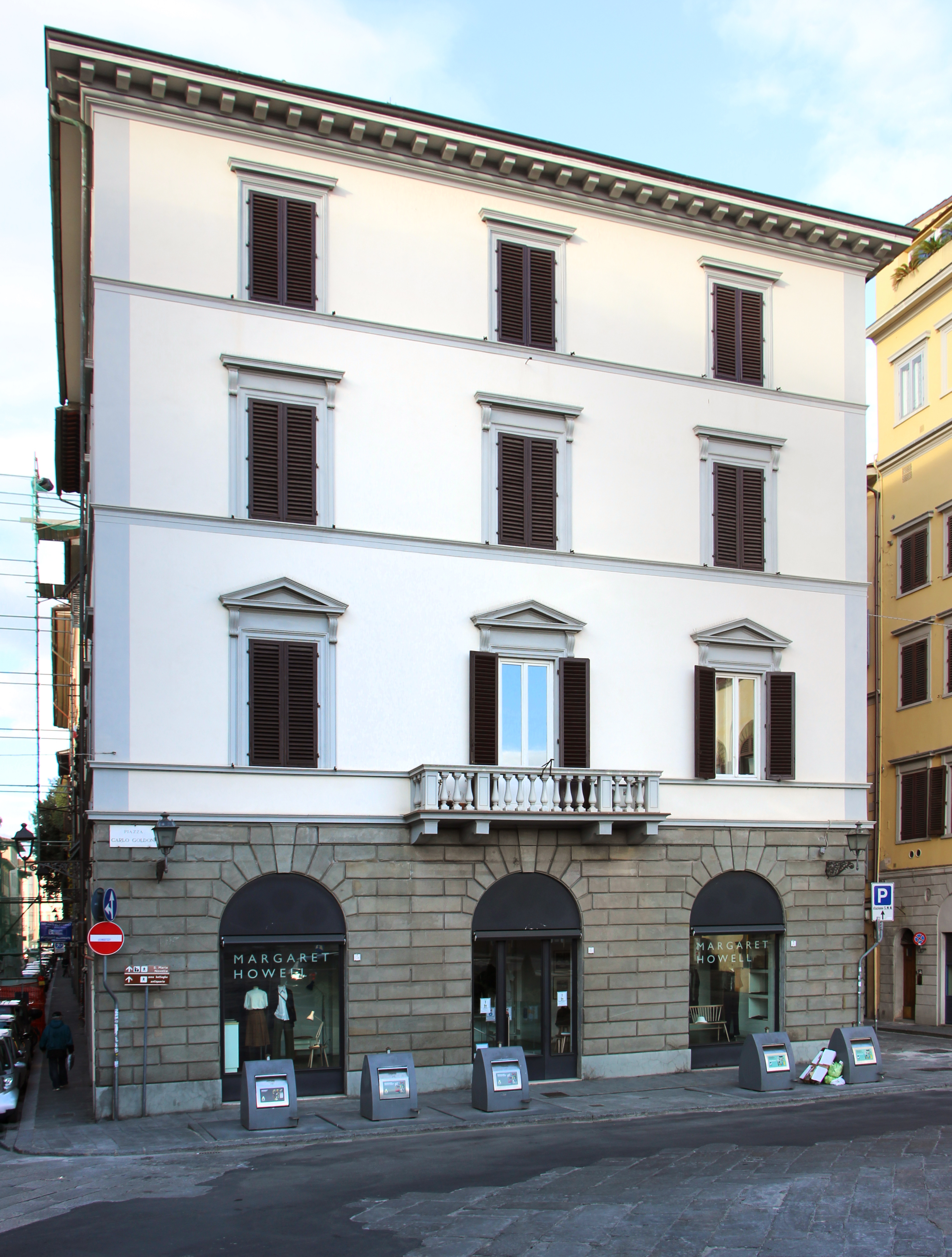
Margaret Howell branch in Florence

With her then husband Paul Renshaw as business partner Howell opened her first independent shop in St Christopher's Place, London in 1980. Recognition followed and the label grew.

A profile in French Elle in 1977 noted: “In her precise and meticulous working methods, Margaret Howell is more a craftsman than an industrialist.” Jack Nicholson was a fan and insisted on wearing his own Margaret Howell corduroy jacket for his role in 1980s The Shining, prompting an order for 12 duplicates from Stanley Kubrick.

1982 saw Grace Coddington choose a Howell piece as Dress of the Year. A New York City shop opened in Manhattan in 1982 and the first Margaret Howell standalone shop opened in Aoyama, Tokyo in 1983. However, this rapid expansion caused both business and personal difficulties. The couple divorced in 1987 and Renshaw left the company. It was restructured in 1990 with the help of Sam Sugure, responsible for Japanese licensing, and Richard Craig, who remains as managing director. The new management proved successful and steady growth followed. The company set up its own shirt factory in Edmonton, north London, in 2000 and opened the flagship Wigmore Street, London shop in 2002, designed collaboratively with Will Russell of Pentagram.

The Wigmore Street shop accommodates a design studio but and is spacious enough for Howell to mount exhibitions, host events, and retail products that complements her own work, such as Poole Pottery, Ercol, Anglepoise, and items selected from designers such as Robert Welch and David Mellor. The MHL clothing line was introduced in 2004, and the first of a series of collaborations to produce a shirt with other designers – Margaret Howell Plus – began in 2010 with Kenneth Grange, followed by Sam Hecht, Dan Pearson and Georgina von Etzdorf. Today Margaret Howell employs some 500 people in more than 80 locations, including Paris, Florence and Tokyo.

Howell continues to live in south-east London.

== Character as a Designer ==
Howell's influences and interests – architecture, fine art, modern design, photography, swimming, swimming pools and coastal landscapes, traditional crafts of the British Isles – are reflected in the series of calendars she has produced since 1995.

Keynote designs are her variations on the well-tailored shirt, gymslip, lace-up shoe, duffel coat and trench coat. With their androgynous quality, and sympathetically shot by photographers such as Bruce Weber, Koto Bolofo, and Alasdair McLellan, her clothes have been described as 'marrying traditional styles with modern appeal... [so] all her work... has a stylish timelessness.' She herself says, "My style could be described as understated quality, updated modern classics." "I am often inspired by the method by which something is made... Good design has to work. Clothes have to work for people just as a chair has to...”

A short film made with Emily Richardson celebrates the empiricism and inspirations of her approach to clothes.

== Recognition ==
2007 - appointed a CBE for services to the retail industry

2007 - made a Royal Designer for Industry by the Royal Society of Arts.

2010 – Honorary Doctorate from the University of the Arts, London.

2013 – Honorary Professor of the University for the Creative Arts.

2015 – Honorary Fellowship of Goldsmiths College, London.
