= Saeed Zahedi =

British-Iranian engineer

Sir Mir Saeed Zahedi, OBE, FREng, RDI, FIMechE (born 23 May 1957) is a British-Iranian biomedical engineer and innovator who is the Technical Director at Chas A Blatchford & Sons. He was named Royal Designer for Industry in 2014, and in 2016 he appeared on Debrett's 500 List, which recognises Britain's 500 most influential individuals. He was knighted "for services to Engineering and Innovation" in 2017.

== Early life and education ==
Zahedi was born on 23 May 1957 in Tehran, Iran. He moved to the UK as a teenager to attend school in Sloane Square. He studied mechanical engineering at the Polytechnic of Central London, graduating with a Bachelor of Science (BSc) degree. He undertook postgraduate studies in biomedical engineering at the University of Strathclyde. His doctoral thesis was titled "The study of alignment of lower limb prostheses" and was completed in 2007.

== Career ==
Having previously worked as a research assistant at the University of Strathclyde, Zahedi was employed as a medical physicist in charge of a prosthetic clinic in the National Health Service (NHS) during his early career. In 1988, Zahedi began working at Chas A Blatchford & Sons as a project manager. He became Head of Technology at PDD (Pankhurst Design and Development Group Ltd) in 1999.

In 2003, Zahedi returned to Chas A Blatchford & Sons in the research and development unit and was later appointed Technical Director in 2006. He is a visiting professor at Bournemouth University's Design Simulation Research Centre and previously, the University of Surrey.

Zahedi led the team at Blatchford that developed the Linx, the first microprocessor-controlled lower limb prosthetic where the foot and knee continuously ‘talk’ to each other. With its combination of new materials, microprocessor controls and understanding of how people walk, Linx won the 2016 MacRobert Award. This system uses a network of sensors across the knee and foot to collect data on the user's activity which is subsequently used to adapt to the specific movements of the user and their respective environment. In August 2016, he answered questions in an AMA (Ask Me Anything) session on Reddit's IAmA subreddit.

== Honours and awards ==
Zahedi is the author of over 125 publications related to prosthesis research and has patented over 35 inventions. In 2011 he was nominated for the Prince Philip Designers Prize for which he received a Special Commendation. In 2013 he received the Royal Designer for Industry (RDI) award for engineering design.

He and his team were finalists in the 2010 MacRobert Award for work on the Echelon hydraulic ankle-foot, the world's first self-aligning prosthesis. Along with four colleagues, Zahedi won the 2016 MacRobert Award for their development of Linx.

Zahedi is a member of ISO, CEN and IEC Working Groups. He has won 5 BLESMA awards, IMechE Special Needs, and ISPO Forchheimer in 1989, for his PhD work conducted at Strathclyde University.

In the 2000 New Year Honours, Zahedi was awarded an OBE for "services to the Prosthetics Industry". In 2017, during the ISPO World Congress in Cape Town, Zahedi delivered one of the three keynote speeches to the 2,000 participants.

Zahedi received a knighthood in the Queen's Birthday Honours 2017 "for services to Engineering and Innovation".

In 2019 Zahedi was made an Honorary Fellow of the IMechE to recognise his outstanding contribution to innovation and engineering in the field of rehabilitation.

Zahedi served as Chair of the ISPO Scientific Committee from 2020 to 2022 and currently sits on the committee as the Past-Chair, remaining actively involved in the ISPO UK Committee as well as the wider activities of ISPO International.

== Personal life ==
Zahedi married Shirin Zahedi (née Sadeghian) in 1988. The couple has two children. He resides in London.
