= Mike Dempsey (graphic designer) =

British practising graphic designer

Mike Dempsey is a British graphic designer.

== Career ==
From the late 1960s, Dempsey worked in British publishing houses. He created stamps for the Royal Mail, the brand identity for English National Opera, and South Bank Centre His won 10 silver and gold awards from British Design & Art Direction (D&AD). He was a Design Advisor to the Department for Digital, Culture, Media and Sport, and was President of Design & Art Direction (D&AD).

He was made a Royal Designer for Industry (RDI) in 1994 He was Master of the Faculty of Royal Designers for Industry from 2005 to 2007 and is currently the external design advisor to the Design Council.
