= Patrick Bellew =

British architect, engineer

Patrick Bellew RDI FREng FRSA Hon FRIBA CEng
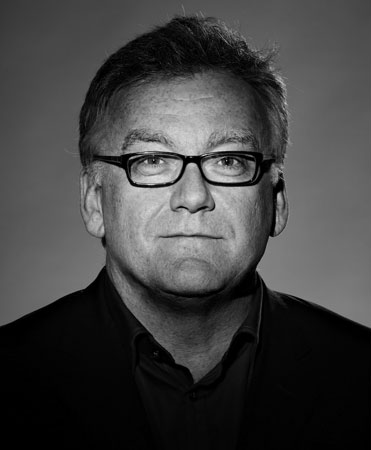
- Born: 12 June 1959 (age 67); Osmotherley, North Yorkshire
- Education: University of Bath
- Occupations: Engineer, environmental designer, visiting professor
- Notable work: The Earth centre Federation Square, Singapore; Baltic Arts Centre; Gardens by the Bay; Great Notley Primary School; Ashmolean Museum; The Earth centre Federation Square, Singapore; Baltic Arts Centre; Kroon Hall, Yale; The National Theatre; WWF headquarters Google, London, Mountain View Ca and Hyderabad
- Board member of: Atelier Ten; UK Green Building Council Limited
- Spouse: Lois Bellew
- Awards: Happold Medal; Honorary Fellow of the Royal Institute of British Architects; Fellow of the Royal Academy of Engineering. Gold and Silver Medal from the Chartered Institution of Building Services Engineers; Fazlur R Khan Lifetime Achievement Award from the Council on Tall Buildings and Urban Habitats

Patrick Bellew, RDI (born June 12, 1959) is a British environmental engineer and educator. He is one of the United Kingdom's Royal Designers and a chartered building services engineer. Bellew is a founding director of the international environmental engineering consultant firm Atelier Ten, that has pioneered numerous environmental innovations focused on sustainable architecture and the delivery of high-performance buildings. He lectures at various universities, including Yale, on issues that affect the environment.

== Education and career ==
Bellew attended Stonyhurst College before proceeding to the University of Bath where he studied for his Bachelor of Science honors at the school of architecture and building engineering until 1981. He was employed at Buro Happold in Bath after completing his four-year degree. He founded Atelier Ten in London in 1990.

Atelier Ten grew to 350 staff in 11 offices by 2020 when it was acquired by the Singapore-based engineering group Surbana Jurong. Patrick remained as chairman and was appointed SJ Group Chief Sustainability Officer in 2023, and a consultant in 2024, before stepping down from day-to-day involvement with Atelier Ten and SJ Group at the beginning of 2025.

Bellew has taught the core environmental design course on the M.Arch program at the Yale University School of Architecture from 2001 to 2006, and he led seven advanced design studios as Eero Saarinen Visiting Professor between 2008 and 2025. He was on the Design Review Committee of CABE from 1999 to 2003, a governor of the Building Centre Trust in London between 1996 and 2011 and was appointed a Trustee of the UK's Design Council in 2025.

== Publications ==
He writes in several United Kingdom design magazines and has published several books:

- Green House: Green Engineering (co-authored with Meredith Davey), ORO Publications, 2012
- Invisible Architecture, Charlotte Fiell, Peter Fiell, Laurence King Publishing
- RIBA Journal
- CIBSE Journal (Chartered Institution of Building Services Engineers).
- BSD magazine (Building Sustainable Designs)

== Awards ==
- In 2001, he was awarded the honorary fellow of the Royal Institute of British Architects.
- In 2004, he became a fellow of the Royal Academy of Engineering.
- In 2008, he delivered the 6th Happold Medal Lecture and received the Happold Medal from the Construction Industry Council and the Happold Foundation.
- Award to the Royal Designers for Industry which he was offered on 25 November 2010.
- In 2013, he was awarded the Silver Medal from the Chartered Institution of Building Services Engineers (CIBSE)
- In 2023 he was awarded the Fazlur R Khan Lifetime Achievement Award from the Council on Tall Buildings and Urban Habitats (CTBUH)
- In 2024 he was awarded the Gold Medal from the Chartered Institution of Building Services Engineers (CIBSE)
