= David Carter (industrial designer) =

British designer (1927–2020)

David Carter CBE FRSA RDI
- Born: 30 December 1927; Leicester, England
- Died: 16 November 2020 (aged 92); Cotswolds, England
- Education: Central School of Art and Design
- Occupation: Industrial designer
- Known for: Stanley knife, Founder of DCA Design
- Spouse: Theo Carter
- Children: 4
- Awards: Prince of Wales Award for Industrial Innovation (1981–85), The Duke of Edinburgh Prize for Elegant Design

Ronald David Carter (30 December 1927 – 16 November 2020) was a British designer known for projects like the Stanley knife and LeShuttle, which carries vehicles under the Channel.

== Early life and career ==
He trained at the Leicester College of Art (now DeMontfort University), simultaneously spending a good part of 2 years in an engineering works. He served in the Navy. Demobbed in 1948 he returned to full-time study in the industrial design (engineering) department of the Central School of Art and Design. He went on to a variety of industrial design positions and then in 1960 he set up on his own as a consultant, going on to employ a growing team of engineers, designers, model-makers and assistants as David Carter Associates.

When designing, he created models preferably full size and made of cardboard early on in his process, "just to get an idea of how big it is", he said. The Stanley knife went through at least six cardboard iterations before he was happy with the result.

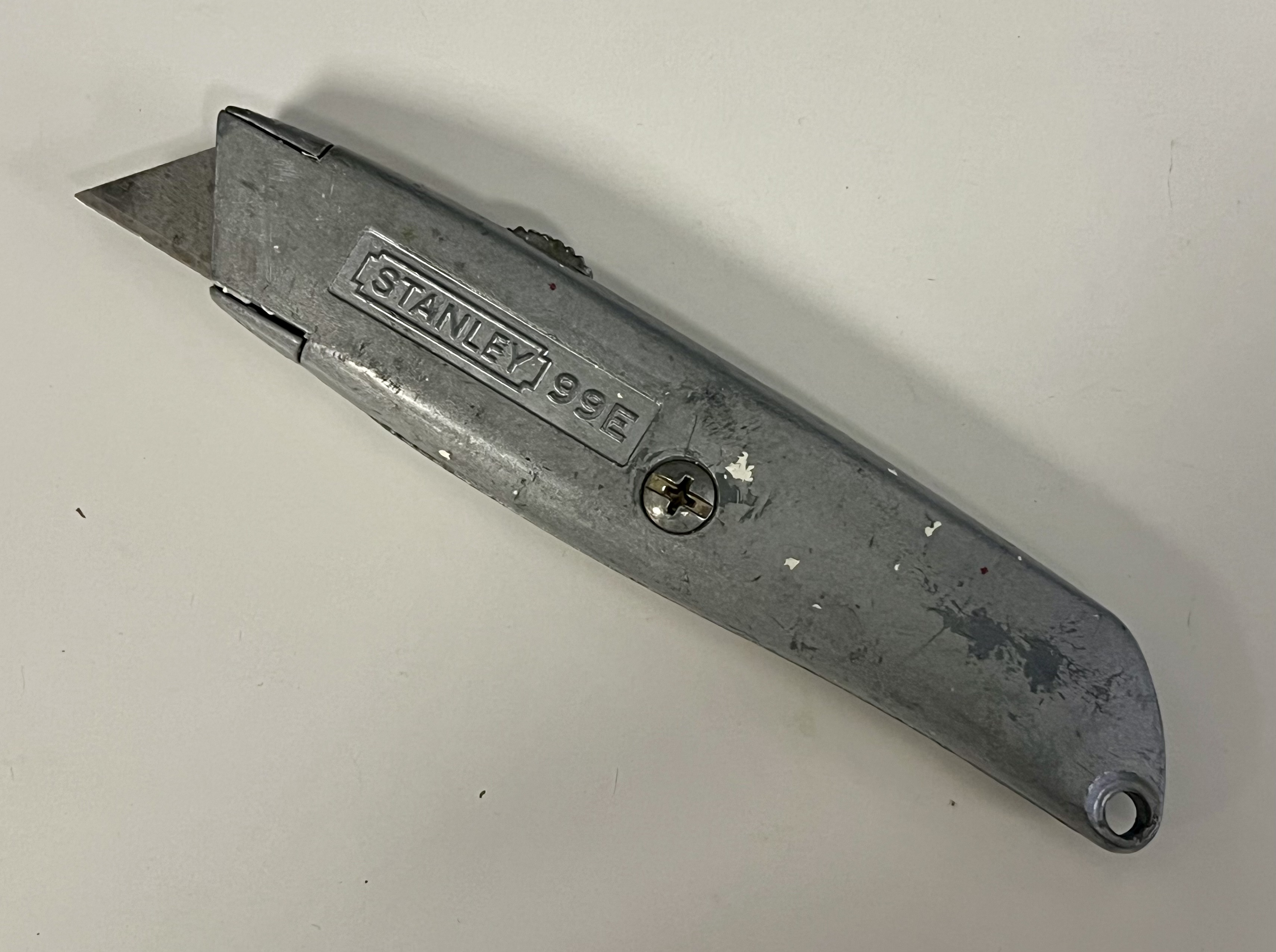
Stanley 99E Utility Knife

In 1970, when household telephones were supplied exclusively by the Post Office, he was commissioned to design a new rotary-dial model that would sit on a table or shelf, or be mounted on the wall. "We were asked to make this telephone cheaper to produce than the existing model," he told The Times.

It was the process by which designs were developed and delivered that truly interested him. As a result he often assigned the intellectual property rights to his clients, rarely applying for patents himself. He insisted that this was not an act of altruism but the only practical way to ensure the efficient execution and dispatch of a design contract.

"I don't want to become an entrepreneur who just pushes designs out one after another," he said.

Simultaneously, he started teaching at the Birmingham College of Art and Design, where his head of department was the late Naum Slutzky, who had been one or Carter's teachers during his time at the Central, and whom Carter identifies as a powerful influence in his work.

Under Carter's continued leadership the David Carter Associates became DCA Design Consultants in 1975 and later renamed itself as DCA Design in 1986. He retired from DCA in 1992, though the company continues to trade to this day from its traditional home and headquarters on Church Street, Warwick in the UK. Also he continued to teach at the Royal College of Art.

Carter's industrial design work has won many prizes including:

- Design Centre Award (1961) for the Orbit castors, for Joseph Gillot & Sons Ltd.
- The Prince of Wales Award for Industrial Innovation (1981–85)
- The Duke of Edinburgh Prize for Elegant Design (also known as the Prince Philip Designers Prize) for a Gas-Flo system for the Wales Gas Board (1967)

Carter established himself as a renowned industrial designer, becoming a member of the Royal Society of Arts, the Design Council, the Society of Industrial Artists and Designers and the Royal College of Art.

Carter was president of the Society of Industrial Artists and Designers during 1974–75, was appointed Royal Designer for Industry in 1974, from 1972 to 1984 he was deputy chairman of the Design Council and was a trustee of the Conran Boilerhouse Foundation, chairman of the Design Museum and chairman of the Royal Society of Arts Design Board in 1983. He was appointed Commander of the Order of the British Empire (CBE) in 1980.

== Personal life ==
His family split time between a house in the Cotswolds and a cottage on the coast at Tralong in County Cork. He died of complications from dementia on 16 November 2020, aged 92. He married Theo Towers in 1953, an artist who became a freelance fashion illustrator for Vogue. Theo died in 2013 and Carter was survived by their children: Steven, a copywriter; Jonathan, an architect; Jane, who is marketing director of Disney in Paris, and her twin, Helen, a HR manager for the National Health Service.
