= Marion Deuchars =

British illustrator and author (born 1964)

Marion Deuchars RDI
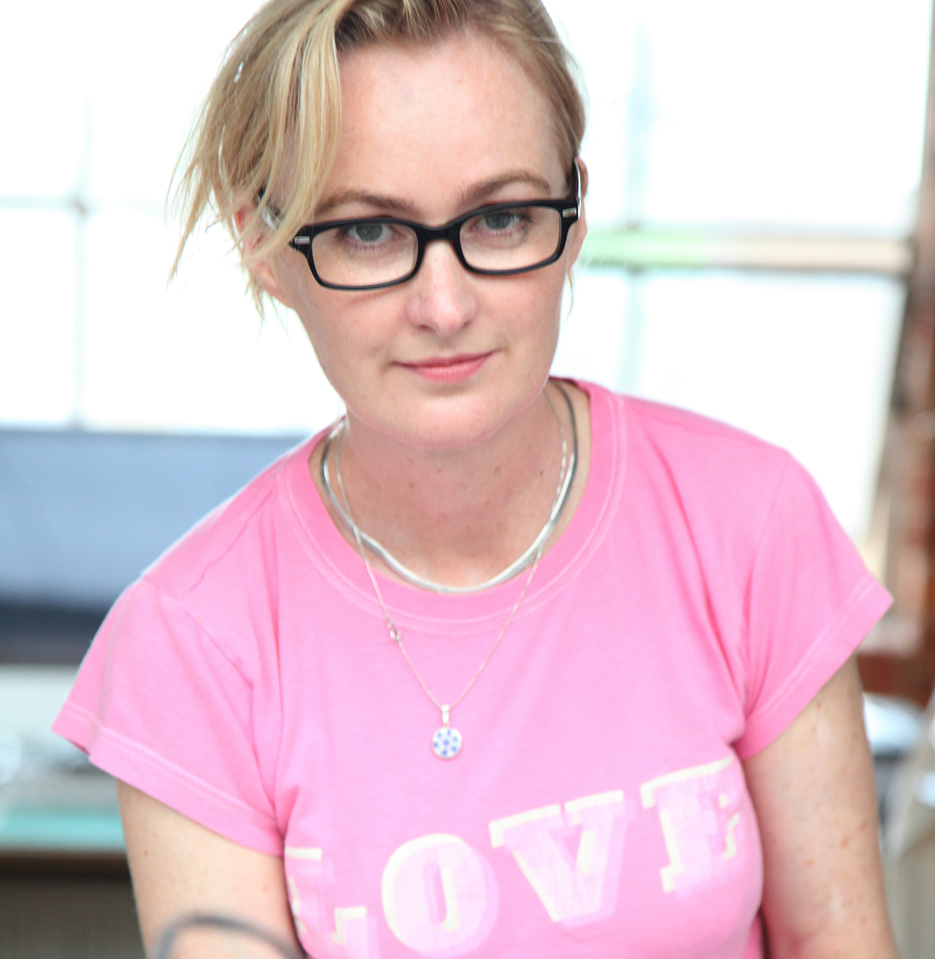
- Born: 1964 (age 61–62); Falkirk, Stirlingshire United Kingdom
- Occupations: Illustrator, author
- Writing career
- Genres: Children's books, illustration
- Notable works: Let's make Some Great Art; Let's Make Some Great Fingerprint Art

Marion Deuchars RDI (born 1964) is a British illustrator and author.

== Biography ==
Deuchars is known for her distinctive hand-lettering and for a wide range of internationally published art and activity books.

Deuchars studied Illustration and Printmaking at Duncan of Jordanstone College of Art from 1983 to 1987, graduating with a first-class BA Honours degree. She then attended the Royal College of Art (RCA), completing an MA in Communication, Art and Design in 1989 with distinction. She was later awarded an Honorary Fellowship of the Royal College of Art (HonRCA) for her contribution to contemporary illustration.

She first gained broad recognition for her expressive hand-lettering in the 2002 D&AD Annual titled What’s the point, art directed by Vince Frost, for which she hand-wrote all 5,496 words. Her lettering has since featured in major commissions, including a set of Royal Mail stamps celebrating the Royal Shakespeare Company’s 50th anniversary, created with Hat-Trick Design. Her work has also appeared in branding and commercial projects for clients including Cass Art, Jamie Oliver, and Carluccio’s (in collaboration with Irving & Co).

Deuchars has designed numerous book covers for the Spanish publisher Editorial Losada and was the sole illustrator for the Guardian Saturday edition between 2005 and 2007. Her cover for the Penguin Modern Classics edition of Burmese Days by George Orwell won the 2010 Victoria and Albert Museum Book Cover Illustration Award.

In 2012 she was selected by the British Council as one of six creatives to represent the United Kingdom at the World Design Capital Helsinki. Her awards include Gold and Silver honours from the Art Directors Club New York, multiple D&AD Yellow Pencils, and she has been a member of the Alliance Graphique Internationale (AGI) since 2000.

As an author and illustrator, Deuchars has created a number of influential books, including the bestselling Let’s Make Some Great Art series and the children’s picture book Bob the Artist. Her publications continue to explore drawing, creativity, and accessible art education, with recent works including Colour, The ME Book, and Take a Line for a Walk.

In November 2018, she was appointed a Royal Designer for Industry (RDI). She works from her studio in North London and is married to graphic designer Angus Hyland.

== Bibliography ==
- 2011 – Let's Make Some Great Art, Laurence King Publishing, ISBN 9781856697866
- 2012 – Let's Make Some Great Fingerprint Art, Laurence King Publishing, ISBN 9781780670157
- 2013 – Let’s Make Some Great Placemat Art, Laurence King Publishing, ISBN 9781856699211
- 2014 – Draw Paint Print Like the Great Artists, Laurence King Publishing, ISBN 9781780672816
- 2014 – Let’s Make More Great Placemat Art, Laurence King Publishing, ISBN 9781856699358
- 2015 – Let’s Make Some Great Art Notebooks, Laurence King Publishing, ISBN 9781856699525
- 2016 – Art Play, Laurence King Publishing, ISBN 9781780678764
- 2016 – Bob the Artist, Laurence King Publishing, ISBN 9781780677712
- 2017 – Colour, Particular Books (Penguin), ISBN 9780141983356
- 2018 – Bob’s Blue Period, Laurence King Publishing, ISBN 9781786270696
- 2018 – Bob the Artist: Dominoes, Laurence King Publishing, ISBN 9781786271587
- 2020 – Bob Goes Pop, Laurence King Publishing, ISBN 9781786274908
- 2020 – The Spots and the Dots (text by Helen Baugh, illustrated by Marion Deuchars), Andersen Press, ISBN 9781783449248
- 2020 – Let's Make Some Great Art: Animals, Laurence King Publishing, ISBN 9781786276865
- 2020 – Let's Make Some Great Art: Patterns, Laurence King Publishing, ISBN 9781786276889
- 2020 – Let's Make Some Great Art: Colours, Laurence King Publishing, ISBN 9781786277718
- 2021 – Let’s Look at… Shapes, Laurence King Publishing, ISBN 9781786277787
- 2021 – Let’s Look at… Numbers, Laurence King Publishing, ISBN 9781786277800
- 2021 – Let’s Look at… Animals, Laurence King Publishing, ISBN 9781786277824
- 2021 – Let’s Look at… Colours, Laurence King Publishing, ISBN 9781786277763
- 2022 – Let’s Look at… Opposites, Laurence King Publishing, ISBN 9781510230002
- 2022 – Let’s Look at… Nature, Laurence King Publishing, ISBN 9781510230163
- 2022 – The ME Book: An Art Activity Book, Laurence King Publishing, ISBN 9781510230187
- 2023 – Yoga for Stiff Birds, Skittledog / Thames & Hudson, ISBN 9781837760121
- 2023 – Draw This!: Art Activities to Unlock the Imagination, Hachette Children’s Group / Laurence King, ISBN 9781510230217
- 2024 – Make Every Day Creative: Art Anyone Can Do, Skittledog / Thames & Hudson, ISBN 9781837760152
- 2025 – How to Be a Fit Bird, Skittledog / Thames & Hudson, ISBN 9781837760503
- 2025 – Take a Line for a Walk, Thames & Hudson, ISBN 9780500660393
