= Dinah Casson =

British interior designer

Dinah Casson CBE RDI is a British interior designer, specialising in museum and exhibition design. She was elected as a Royal Designer for Industry in 2005 in recognition of her 20 years "sustained excellence in aesthetic and efficient design for industry". She is the author of Closed on Mondays: Behind the Scenes at the Museum (Lund Humphries Publishers Ltd, 2020).

== Early life ==
Casson is the daughter of late British architects Sir Hugh Maxwell Casson and Margaret Casson.

Casson studied at Ravensbourne College of Art and Design, graduating in 1968. She was awarded an honorary fellowship from the Royal College of Art in 1996 and an honorary degree from Surrey Institute of Art and Design in 2003.

== Work ==
In 1970, Casson set up her design practice and, in partnership with Roger Mann, founded design studio Casson Mann in 1984. She was shortlisted for the Prince Philip Designers Prize in 2011.

Dinah Casson is a trustee of the Creative Education Trust, The Charleston Trust, the Towner Gallery and was Master Elect of the Faculty of Royal Designers for Industry from 2011 to 2013. She is a member of the Royal Mail Stamps Advisory Committee. She taught at Kingston University, Bristol University School of Architecture and the Royal College of Art.

== Reception ==
In 2018, Casson was awarded a CBE for services to design.
