= Wendy Ramshaw =

British ceramicist, jeweller and sculptor (1939–2018)

- Born: Wendy Anne Jopling Ramshaw; 26 May 1939; Sunderland, England
- Died: 9 December 2018 (aged 79)
- Education: Newcastle-upon-Tyne College of Art; University of Reading
- Occupation: Designer
- Spouse: David Watkins
- Website: site

Wendy Anne Jopling Ramshaw CBE RDI (26 May 1939 – 9 December 2018) was a British ceramicist, jeweller and sculptor. Her signature ringsets are in 70 public collections in both museums and art galleries.

== Life ==
Ramshaw was born in Sunderland in 1939. She first studied fabric design at Newcastle-upon-Tyne College of Art and Industrial Design. She was at the University of Reading where she met her lifelong partner David Watkins in 1961. She went on to study at the Central School of Art and Design in 1969.

She was first noticed when Mary Quant was selling her paper jewellery. Customers had to cut out the jewellery and assemble it from paper patterns. Her signature pieces were developed in about 1965 and consist of gold rings stored on a single post. This was seen as a novel way to store jewellery. This won her the Design Council Award for Innovation in 1972.

== Exhibitions include ==
- Picasso's Ladies (1989)
- Rooms of Dreams (2002)
- Prospero's Table (2004)
- Journey Through Glass (2007)

== Legacy ==
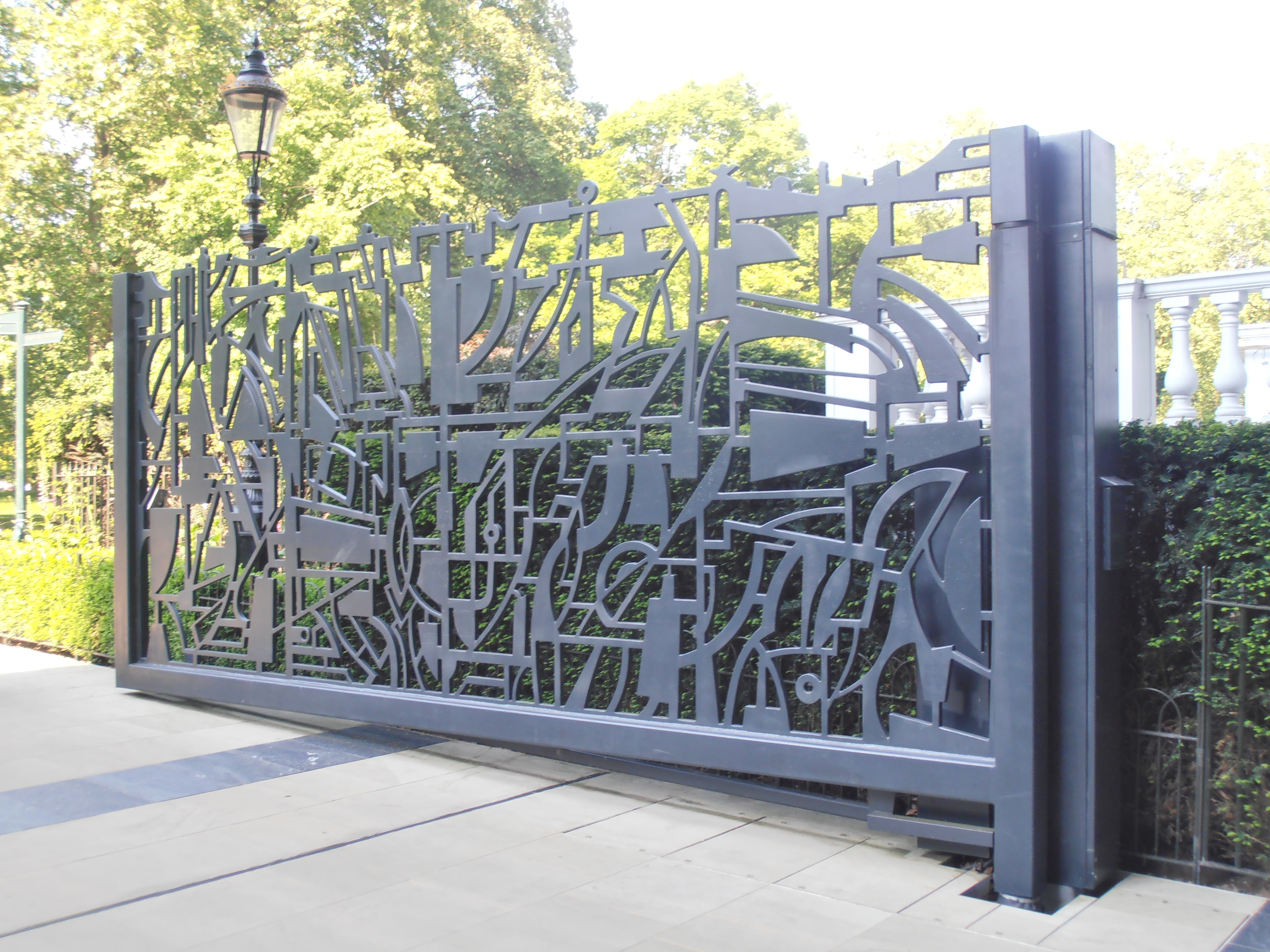
New gates at Hyde Park by Wendy Ramshaw

In 2009 Graham Hughes wrote a joint biography of Ramshaw and her husband, and fellow designer, David Watkins. Her signature jewellery ringsets are in 70 public collections including the Victoria & Albert Museum, National Museums Scotland, Art Gallery of Western Australia, the British Museum, Metropolitan Museum of Art and the National Museum of Modern Art in Kyoto.
