= Johanna Gibbons =

Landscape architect

Johanna Gibbons is a British landscape architect and founding partner of the practice J & L Gibbons. Her work focuses on urban greening, ecological networks, and the relationship between people and landscape.

Trained at Edinburgh College of Art under David Skinner, a disciple of Design with Nature author Ian McHarg.

== Career ==
In 1986 Johanna founded J&L Gibbons based in London, UK. She is a Fellow of the Landscape Institute and The Royal Society of Arts.

She is a Research Partner of Urban Mind and panel advisor to Historic England. She has an international profile as a member of the International Scientific Committee for the World Forum on Urban Forests and as a design juror for Europan and the Holcim Foundation committed to sustainable design.

In 2019, she launched Landscape Learn a social enterprise founded by J & L Gibbons that provides cross-disciplinary and immersive landscape education.

As of November 2025, she has been elected as the next Master of the Royal Designers for Industry. The first Landscape Architect to hold this role.

== Notable projects ==
- Natural History Museum Urban Nature Project (2020–present) designed with Feilden Fowles Architects, transforms the gardens into a centre for urban biodiversity research, education, and conservation.
- John Morden Centre at Morden College (2019–2021) in Blackheath with Mæ Architects combines new buildings and gardens with historic almshouses and mature trees to provide healthcare and social spaces. Won the RIBA Stirling Prize in 2023.
- Bushey Cemetery, Hertfordshire (2017) was redesigned by J & L Gibbons with Waugh Thistleton Architects, creating a tranquil woodland burial ground was shortlisted for the RIBA Stirling Prize in 2018.
- Dalston Eastern Curve Garden, London (2010) transformed a former railway line into a community garden and cultural space. Won the Landscape Institute President Award in 2011. In 2025, the park won the neighbourhood park award from World Urban Park.
- Oxford Street, London (2025) working with lead architects Hawkins Brown and others in developing designs for the pedestrianisation of Oxford Street.
