= Sonny Levi =

English boat designer (1926–2016)

Renato "Sonny" Levi RDI (3 September 1926 – 12 November 2016) was an English boat designer known for creating powerboats for the Aga Khan, the Shah of Iran, and Richard Branson.

== Early life ==
Renato Levi was born in Karachi on 3 September 1926 into a family that had fled fascism in Italy, but he was educated in France and at Darjeeling in India.

== Career ==
Levi learned about boat design in his uncle's boat-design business Afco in Bombay. He moved to England in 1944 and became a pilot in Spitfires with the Royal Air Force. After demobilisation he founded his own boatyard in Anzio in 1960. He invented a surface propulsion system which increased speed and reduced drag and was installed on Richard Branson's Virgin Atlantic Challenger II. In 1986 he was appointed a Royal Designer for Industry.

== Books ==
Levi wrote and published two books about high speed design on water, Dhows To Deltas and Milestones In My Design.

== Awards ==
In 1987, Levi had his achievements recognised with his election as a Royal Designer for Industry, a distinction regarded as the highest honour obtainable in the field of design.

In September 2016, he was awarded with an honorary degree in boat design by the University of Genoa.

== Death ==
Levi died on 12 November 2016.
