= David Watkins (designer) =

British artist

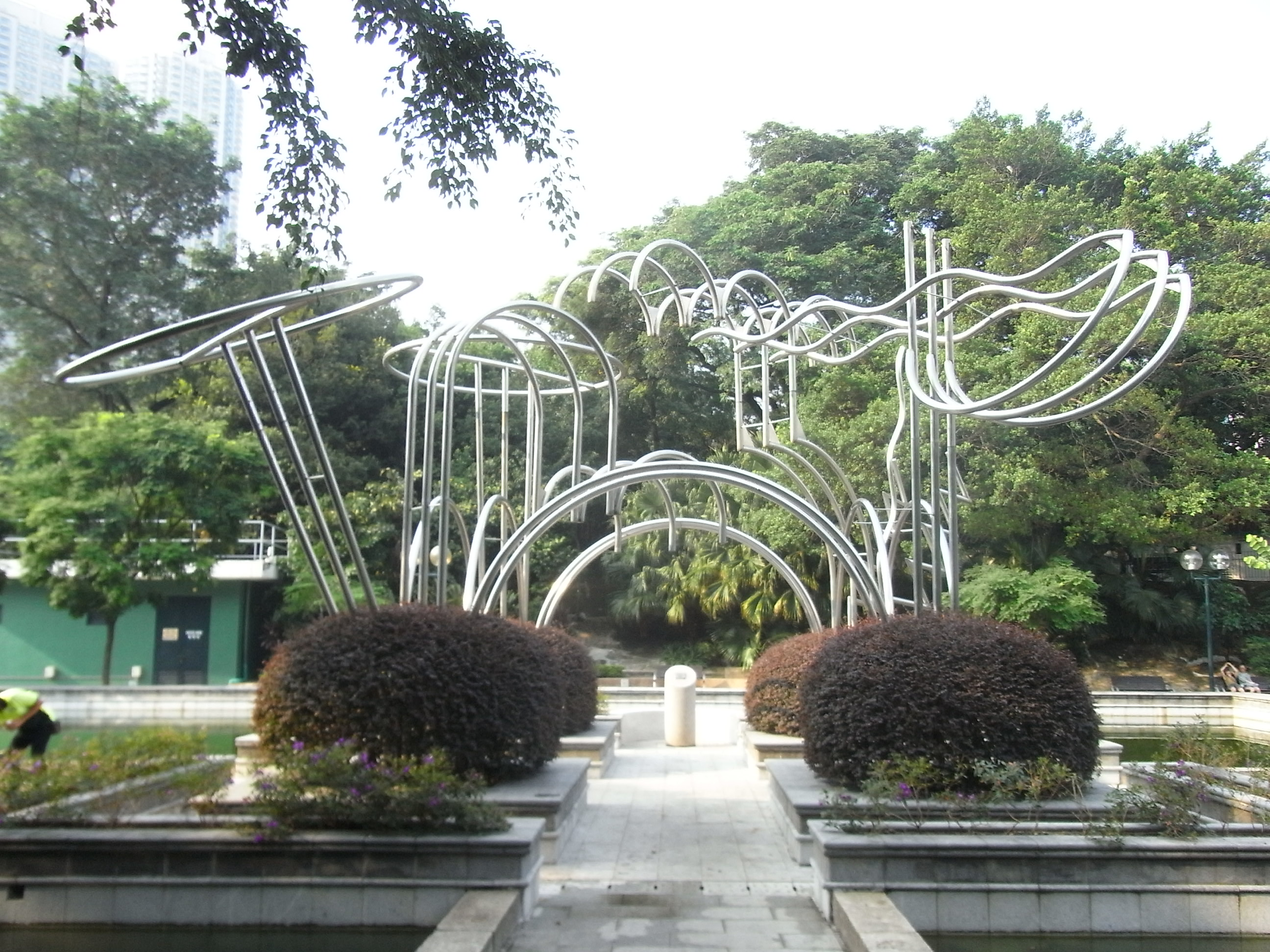
His artworks

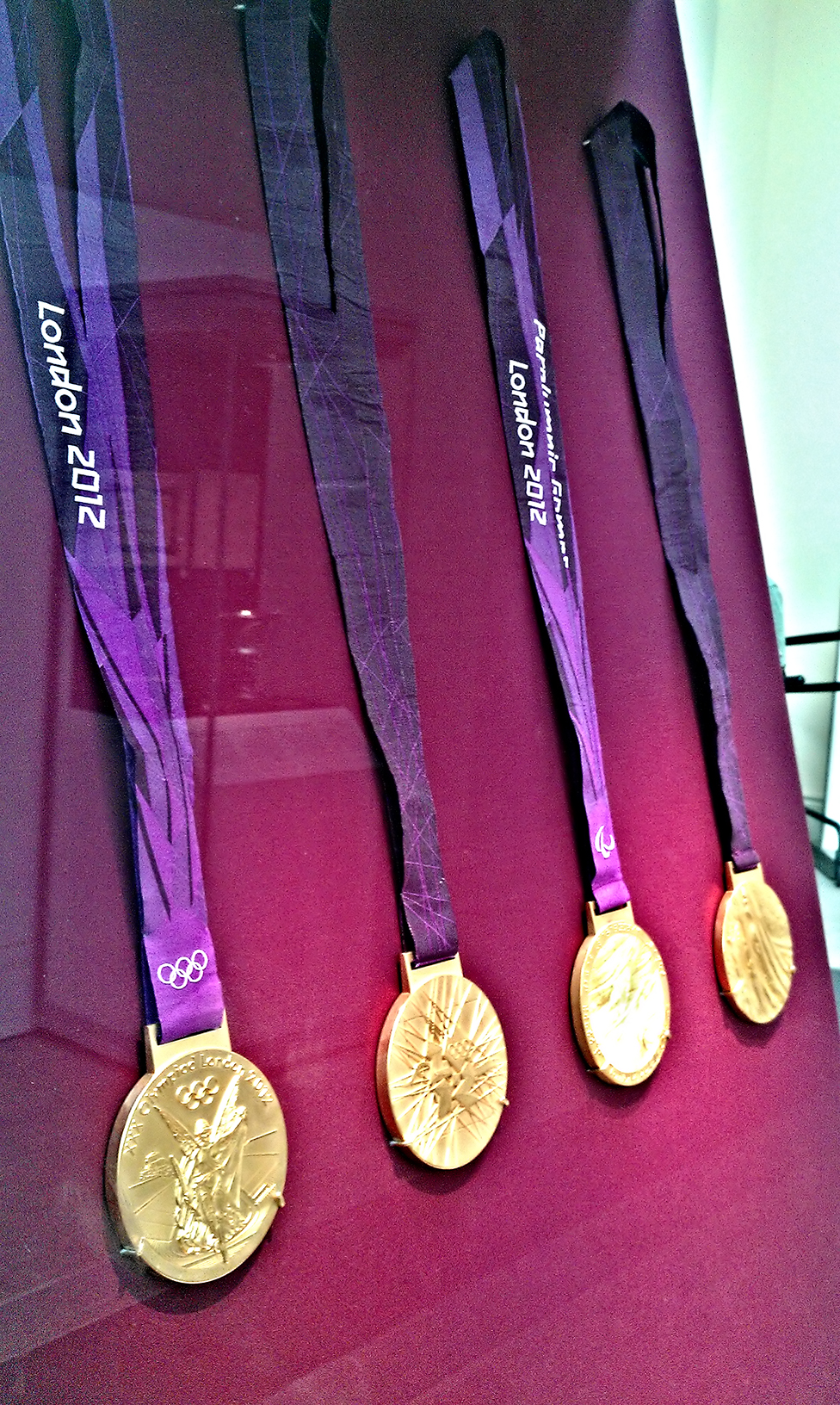
Medals of London 2012 Olympics designed by Watkins

David Watkins is a British artist who has designed the medals for the London 2012 Olympics. Watkins was also a special effects maker for the film 2001: A Space Odyssey.

== Life ==
Watkins was born in Wolverhampton in 1940 and he is a graduate of the University of Reading (1963 Fine Arts) where he met his lifelong partner Wendy Ramshaw.

Ramshaw is a Royal Designer for Industry and he has produced work for the Metropolitan Museum in New York and the National Museum of Modern Art in Tokyo.

National Life Stories conducted an oral history interview (C960/74) with Watkins in 2006 for its Crafts Lives collection held by the British Library. In 2009 Graham Hughes wrote a joint biography of Watkins and his wife and fellow designer Wendy Ramshaw.

In 2010 a retrospective exhibition of his work was held at the Victoria & Albert Museum, London, titled Artist in Jewellery, a Retrospective View (1972–2010).

== Selected publications ==
- David Watkins encounters. Barcelona: Sd-edicions-Hipòtesi joies, 2004. (With Barbara Cartlidge & Mònica Gaspar) ISBN 84-607-9243-9
