= Prosthetics and Orthotics International =

- Discipline: Health Sciences
- Language: English
- Edited by: Dr. David Boone, Orthocare Innovations, Edmonds, Washington, USA.

Publication details
- History: 1977–present
- Publisher: SAGE Publications (United Kingdom)
- Frequency: Bimonthly
- Impact factor: 1.482 (2018)

Standard abbreviations
- ISO 4: Prosthet. Orthot. Int.

Indexing
- ISSN: 0309-3646 (print); 1746-1553 (web)
- OCLC no.: 3486810

Links
- Journal homepage; Online access; Online archive

Prosthetics and Orthotics International is a peer-reviewed academic journal that publishes papers in the field of orthopedics. The journal's editor-in-chief is Dr. David Boone (Orthocare Innovations, Edmonds, Washington, USA). It has been in publication since 1977 and is currently published by SAGE Publications on behalf of International Society for Prosthetics and Orthotics.

== Scope ==
Prosthetics and Orthotics International is aimed at all professionals who have an interest in the medical, clinical, rehabilitation and research aspects of prosthetics, orthotics and rehabilitation engineering and their related topics. The journal is multidisciplinary and publishes review articles, experimental and clinical research papers.

== Abstracting and indexing ==
Prosthetics and Orthotics International is abstracted and indexed in, among other databases: SCOPUS, and the Sciences Citation Index. According to the Journal Citation Reports, its 2018 impact factor is 1.482, ranking it 37 out of 65 journals in the category ‘Rehabilitation’. and 50 out of 76 journals in the category "Orthopedics".
