= Yrjö Kukkapuro =

Finnish designer and architect (1933–2025)

Yrjö Kukkapuro RDI
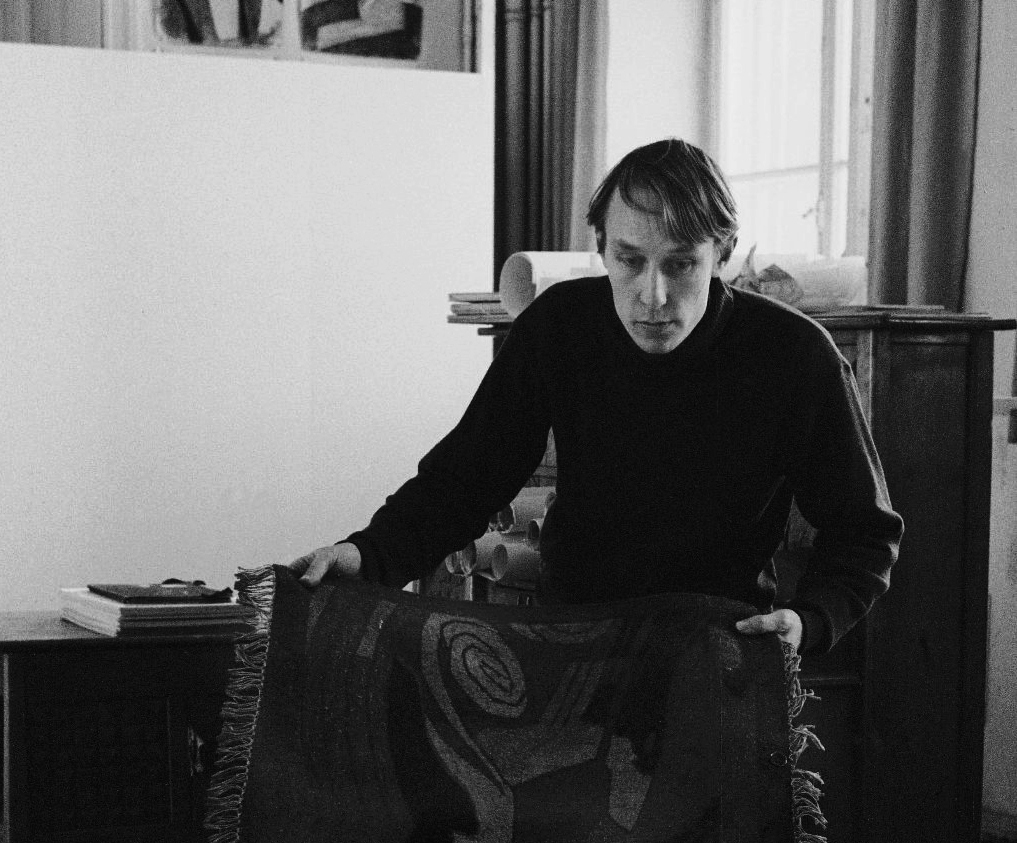
- Kukkapuro in 1964
- Born: 6 April 1933; Viipurin maalaiskunta, Finland
- Died: 8 February 2025 (aged 91); Kauniainen, Finland
- Education: Institute of Industrial Arts
- Occupation: Architect
- Spouse: Irmeli Kukkapuro
- Awards: Pro Finlandia medal (1983); Honorary Royal Designer for Industry (2002)
- Website: kukkapuro.fi

Yrjö Kukkapuro RDI (6 April 1933 – 8 February 2025) was a Finnish interior architect and furniture designer.

== Education and academic career ==
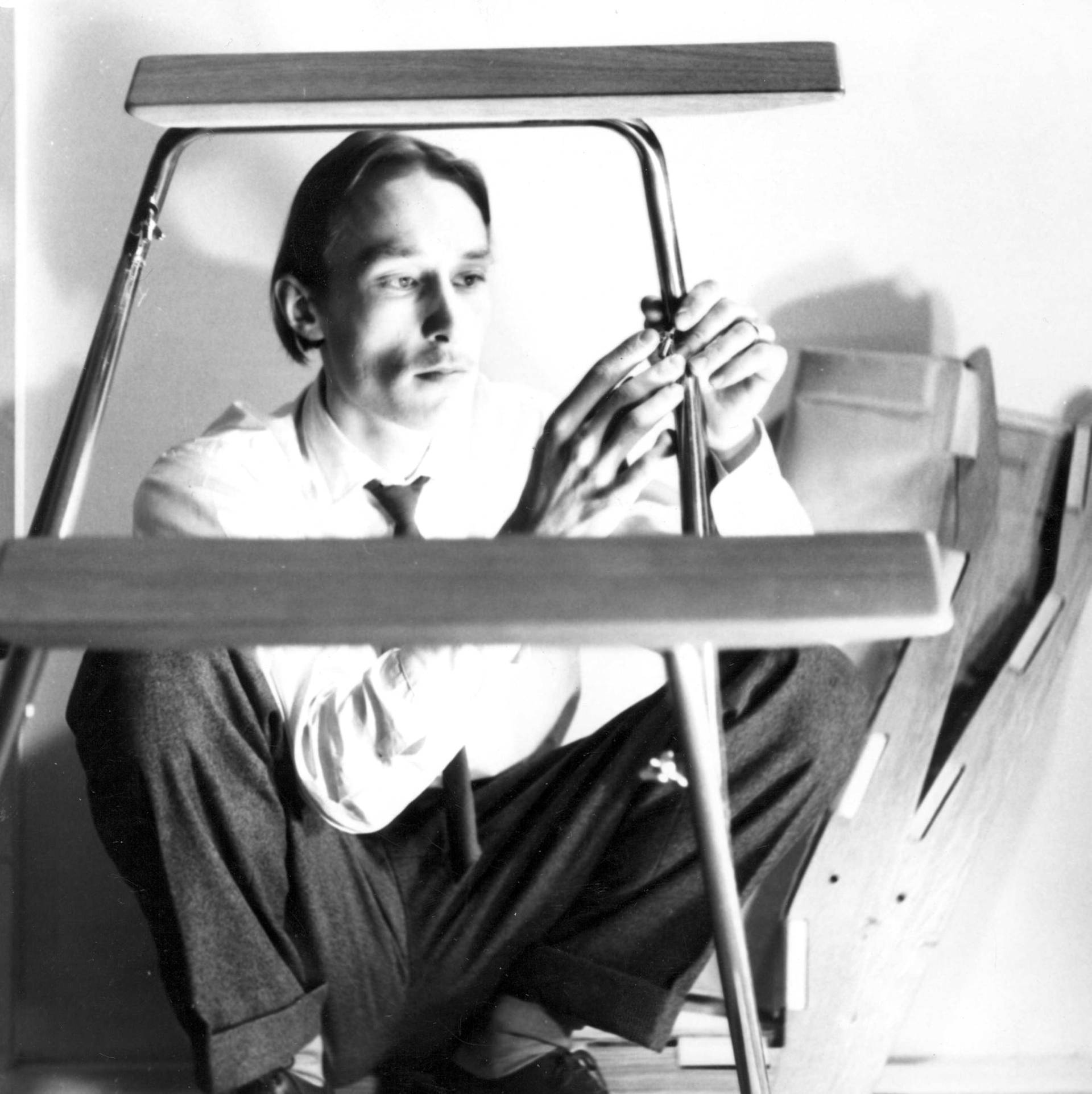
Photograph of the Finnish designer Yrjö Kukkapuro in 1960

Kukkapuro studied design at the Institute of Industrial Arts in Helsinki in the late 1950s, qualifying as an interior architect in 1958.

In the 1970s he returned to the Institute, to work as a Professor and, for two years, as the Rector.

He held Honorary Professorships at universities including Jiangnan (Wuxi) and Nanjing, as well as an Honorary Doctorate from the University of Art and Design Helsinki (now part of the Aalto University School of Arts, Design and Architecture).

== Design work ==
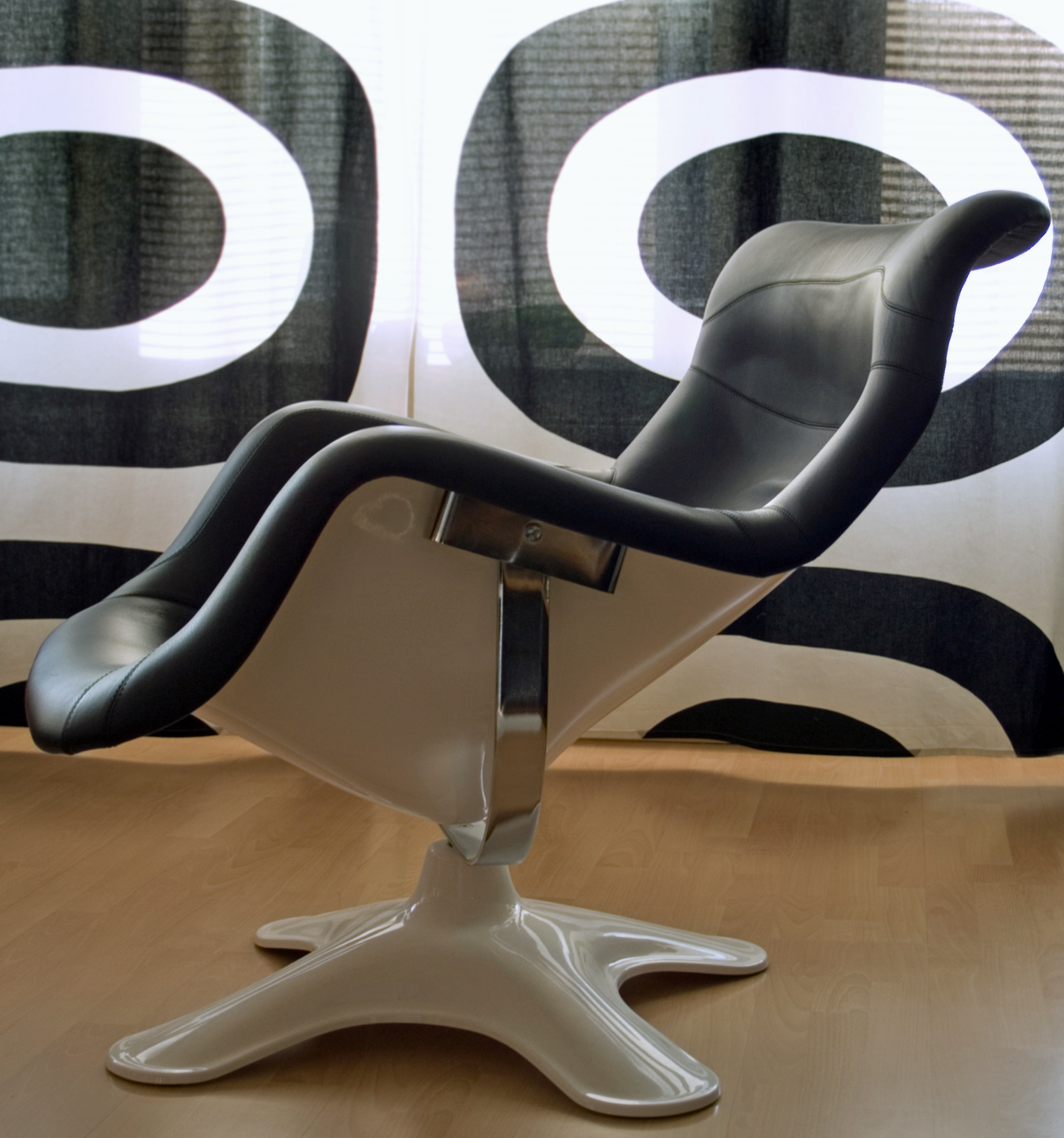
Karuselli chair

Kukkapuro's design philosophy centred around ergonomics.

He was best known for his chairs, of which perhaps the most famous is an easy chair called Karuselli ('Carousel') from 1964, which is included in the permanent collection of major museums including the Museum of Modern Art in New York and the Victoria and Albert Museum in London. It was nominated as the most comfortable chair in the world by The New York Times in 1974, and fellow designer Sir Terence Conran has called it his "favourite place to sit because it is so comfortable".

Kukkapuro exhibited in dozens of solo and group exhibitions around the world.

== Personal life and death ==
Yrjö Kukkapuro was married to graphic artist Irmeli Kukkapuro (née Salminen) since 1954. The couple built a home studio in Kauniainen, designed by Yrjö Kukkapuro and his long-time collaborator, engineer Eero Paloheimo. Irmeli died in 2022.

Kukkapuro died after a long illness at his residence outside Helsinki, on 8 February 2025, at the age of 91. According to his daughter, he kept working until the end, asking only a week before his death for his assistant to visit, because he had a nearly-finished chair design he wanted to discuss.

== Awards and recognition ==
In 1983, Kukkapuro was awarded the Pro Finlandia medal of the Order of the Lion of Finland.

In 2002, he was appointed Honorary Royal Designer for Industry of the UK's Royal Society of Arts.
