= Margaret Leischner =

British-German textile designer and educator

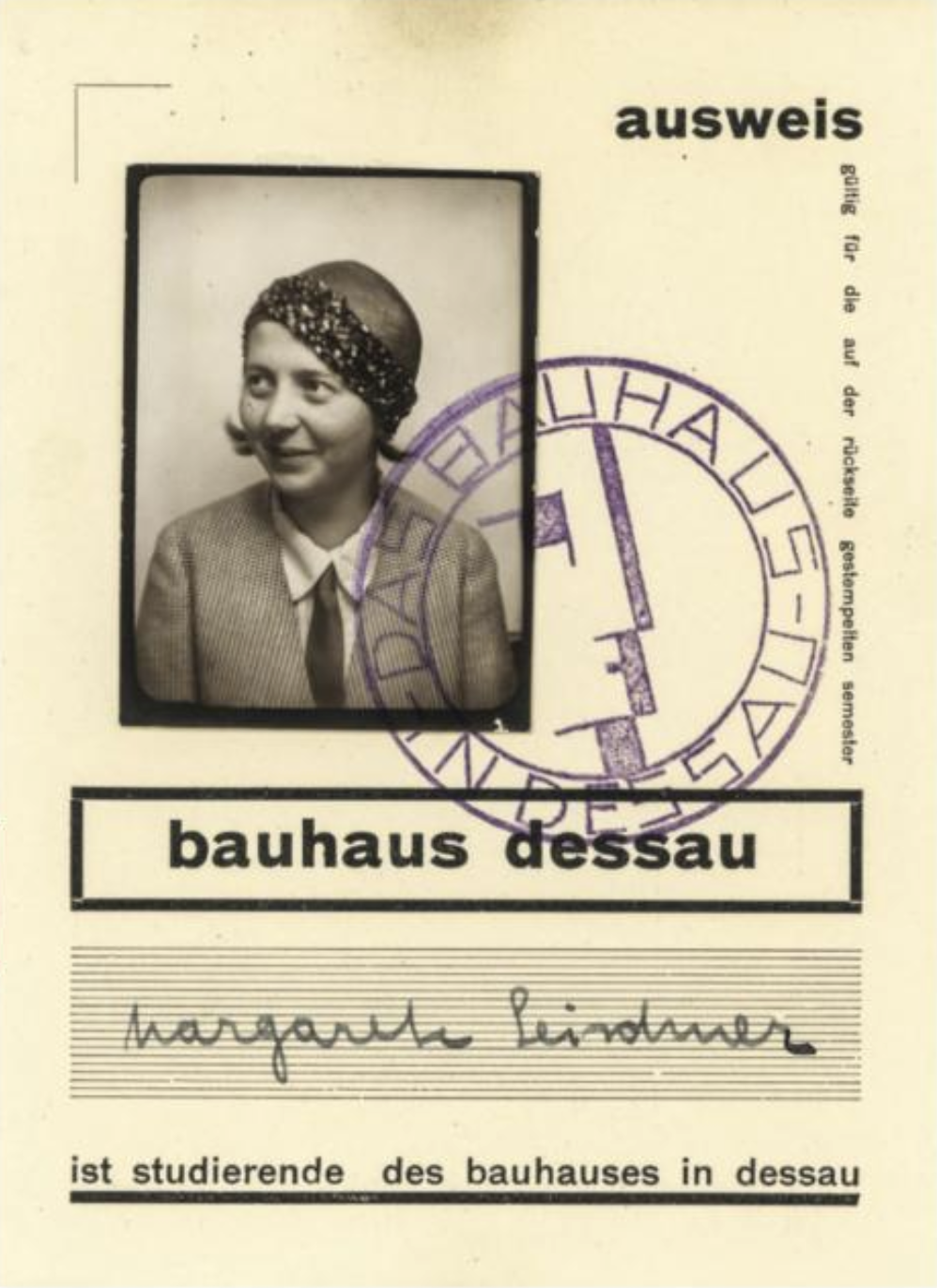
- Leischner's student ID from the Bauhaus in Dessau
- Born: April 15, 1907; Bischofswerda, Saxony, Germany
- Died: May 18, 1970 (aged 63); Maplehurst, West Sussex, England
- Known for: Weaving

Margaret Leischner RDI (April 15, 1907, in Bischofswerda as Frida Margarete Leischner – May 18, 1970, in Maplehurst, West Sussex, United Kingdom) was a British-German textile designer and educator. A former student at the Bauhaus, she was named Royal Designer for Industry (RDI) in 1969.

== Germany ==
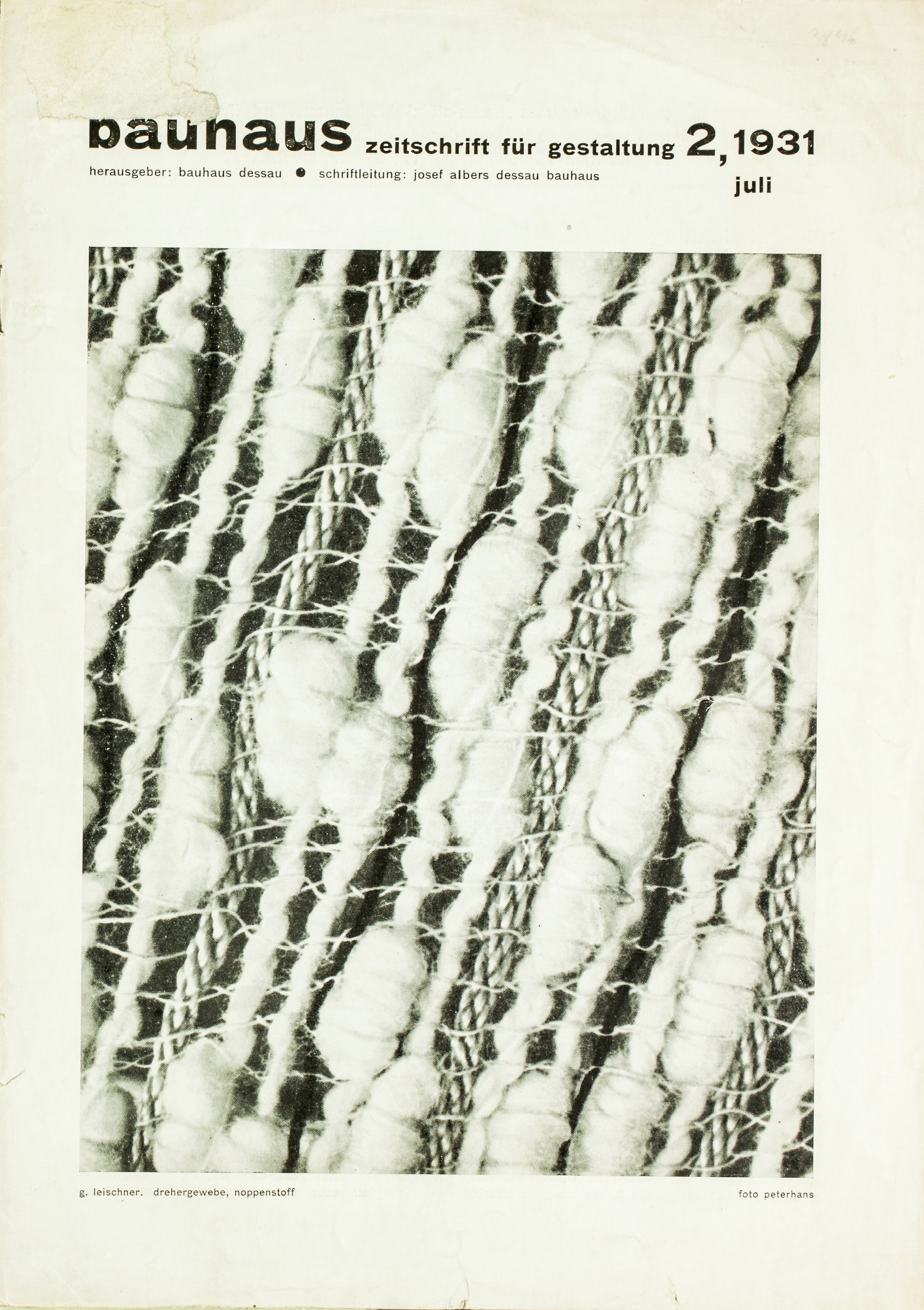
Cover of the Bauhaus: Zeitschrift für Gestaltung in July 1931, featuring Leischner's textile work

Margarete Leischner was born in Bischofswerda in eastern Germany, to butcher Felix Arthur Leischner and his wife Anna Frieda, and grew up in nearby Dresden.

She enrolled at the Bauhaus in Dessau in the winter semester of 1927/1928 and completed the preliminary course with Josef Albers. After passing her journeyman's examination, Leischner became Gunta Stölzl's assistant in 1930, and managed the dye works. The following year she became a freelance designer at the Deutsche Werkstätten Hellerau, in Dresden. In addition, Leischner became head of the weaving department at the Textile and Fashion School of the City of Berlin (now HTW Berlin). She was a member of the Deutscher Werkbund, and joined the Reichskunstkammer after 1933 in order to continue working as a designer.

== England ==
In 1938, Leischner emigrated to England, where she soon called herself Margaret Leischner, and settled in the Manchester area, the center of the UK's textile industry. She worked for Team Valley Weaving Industries in Gateshead. After the outbreak of World War II, she was initially spared internment, but was later interned at Rushen Camp and Port Erin on the Isle of Man, from April 1940 to August 1942.

After her release, she continued to work for the British textile industry. She was also helped by contacts with influential people, such as Herbert Read. She maintained intensive contacts with the emigrated Bauhäusler Lucia Moholy as well as Heinz Loew and is known to have later been in communication with Walter Gropius and Joost Schmidt by letter.

Her work was included in the influential 1946 Britain Can Make It exhibition at the Victoria and Albert Museum in London, organized by the Council of Industrial Design.

Leischner designed new yarns and fabrics for a number of companies, which included testing and experimenting with new materials. In 1948, three years after the war ended, she was appointed professor at the Royal College of Art in London, where she taught the weaving class, and held the position of head of the weaving department until 1963. During this time she developed aircraft interiors for BOAC, as well as upholstery for furniture and car seats. In 1955, Leischner was active in India as a consultant, primarily supporting the establishment of hand weaving mills in Kashmir. In 1959, she designed a series of floor coverings made of sisal fibers under the Tintawn Carpets brand for the company Irish Ropes, who included Leischner's name and photograph in their adverts, brochures, and leaflets.

Leischner was admitted as a member of the Society of Industrial Artists in 1952, and was a founding member of the Textile Group. In 1963, she ended her teaching career in London, becoming an honorary Fellow of the Royal College of Art, and continued as a member of the Textile Council's design scholarship committee.

Her student Eileen Ellis succeeded her at Irish Ropes/Tintawn Carpets in 1967, as Leischner was ill with cancer. The Royal Society of Arts honored her by inducting her as a Royal Designer for Industry (RDI) in 1969. Margaret Leischner died on May 18, 1970, in Maplehurst, West Sussex.

== Sources ==
- Burcu Dogramaci: Bauhaus-Transfer. Die Textildesignerin Margaret Leischner (1907–1970) in Dessau und im britischen Exil. In: Inge Hansen-Schaberg (Hrsg.): Frauen des Bauhauses während der NS-Zeit. Verfolgung und Exil. edition text + kritik, München 2012. ISBN 978-3-86916-212-6. pp 95–116.
- Burcu Dogramaci: Margarete Leischner. In: Elizabeth Otto, Patrick Rösler (Hrsg.): Frauen am Bauhaus. Wegweisende Künstlerinnen der Moderne. Knesebeck, München 2019. ISBN 978-3-95728-230-9. pp 108f. Published in English in 2019 as Bauhaus Women: A Global Perspective ISBN 9781912217960
- Margarete Leischner. In: Patrick Rössler, Elizabeth Otto: Frauen am Bauhaus. Wegweisende Künstlerinnen der Moderne. Knesebeck, München 2019. ISBN 978-3-95728-230-9. pp 108–109. Published in English in 2019 as Bauhaus Women: A Global Perspective ISBN 9781912217960
- Weltge-Wortmann, (1993). Bauhaus Textiles: Women Artists and the Weaving Workshop. 1st ed. London: Thames Hudson. ISBN 9780500280348
- Marisa Vadillo, Women designers at the Bauhaus: The history of a silent revolution. Chapter 2.3, Margaret Leischner and the textile conquest of the United Kingdom, pp 74. (2022). ISBN 9798549712089
