= Royal Designers for Industry =

British organisation

Royal Designer for Industry (RDI)
- Description: The UK's highest design accolade for sustained excellence and social benefit
- Country: United Kingdom
- Presented by: Royal Society of Arts (RSA)
- Website: royaldesignersforindustry.org

Royal Designer for Industry is a distinction established by the British Royal Society of Arts (RSA) in 1936, to encourage a high standard of industrial design and enhance the status of designers. It is the UK’s highest design accolade and is awarded to people who have achieved “sustained design excellence, work of aesthetic value and significant benefit to society”.

== Selection criteria and faculty structure ==
Those who are British citizens take the letters RDI after their names, while those who are not become Honorary RDIs (HonRDI). Everyone who holds the distinction is a Member of The Faculty of Royal Designers for Industry (founded in 1938).

Their work is diverse, ranging from fashion to engineering, theatre to product design, graphics to environmental design.

New RDIs are elected annually and the Faculty continues to support initiatives to further excellence in design, including an annual Summer Session to inspire new generations of thinkers to design a better world.

Only 200 designers may hold the distinction RDI at any time and it is regarded as the highest honour to be obtained in the United Kingdom in a diverse range of design disciplines. In addition, the RSA may confer HonRDI titles up to a maximum of half the number of people who currently hold the distinction RDI.

New RDIs are awarded Diplomas each year at the annual RDI Dinner. Every two years a new Keeper of the Faculty is elected by the past Keepers, who include Dinah Casson, Mike Dempsey and Sir Kenneth Grange. The current Keeper is Johanna Gibbons.

== Current members ==
The list identifies current RDIs, the date of their award, and the category of design for which they were honoured. A separate list of HonRDIs follows.

=== RDIs ===
| Name | Category | Year |
|---|---|---|
| Frith Kerr | Graphic design | 2025 |
| Alexandra Daisy Ginsberg | Multidisciplinary | 2025 |
| Yinka Ilori | Multidisciplinary design | 2025 |
| Mona Chalabi | Data visualisation design | 2025 |
| Teucer Wilson | Stone carving and the design of monuments | 2025 |
| Shona Heath | Film production design | 2024 |
| Lucy Musgrave | Urban design | 2024 |
| Tom Stuart-Smith | Landscape architecture and garden design | 2024 |
| Lucinda Chambers | Fashion design | 2023 |
| Lauren Child | Illustration | 2023 |
| Kate Hopkins | Sound design | 2023 |
| Jon Ardern | Speculative design | 2022 |
| Sebastian Cox | Regenerative design | 2022 |
| Anab Jain | Speculative design | 2022 |
| John Warwicker | New media design | 2022 |
| Ron Arad | Furniture design | 2002 |
| Dennis Bailey | Illustration and design | 1980 |
| Edward Barber OBE | Furniture design | 2007 |
| John Barnard | Engineering design | 1995 |
| Jenny Beavan | Costume design | 2022 |
| Patrick Bellew | Environmental design | 2010 |
| Sir Tim Berners-Lee | Interaction design | 2009 |
| Derek Birdsall | Graphic design | 1983 |
| Peter Blake CBE | Graphic design | 1981 |
| Sir Quentin Blake CBE | Illustration | 1987 |
| Sue Blane MBE | Costume and set design | 2005 |
| Neville Brody | Graphic design | 2011 |
| Alison Brooks | Architectural design | 2017 |
| Peter Brookes | Graphic design | 2002 |
| Julian Brown | Product design | 1998 |
| Paul Brown | Set & costume design | 2013 |
| Margaret Calvert OBE | Graphic design | 2011 |
| Nicholas Butler | Product design | 1981 |
| Ian Callum | Engineering design | 2006 |
| Donald Cameron | Engineering design | 2004 |
| Tristram Carfrae | Engineering design | 2006 |
| David Carter CBE | Product design | 1974 |
| Matthew Carter | Type design | 1981 |
| Ian Cartlidge | Graphic design | 2013 |
| Ron Carter | Furniture design | 1971 |
| Dinah Casson | Interior design | 2005 |
| Hussein Chalayan | Fashion Design | 2013 |
| Sir David Chipperfield CBE | Interior design | 2006 |
| Alison Chitty | Production design | 2009 |
| Jim Clay | Production design | 2009 |
| Peter Clegg | Architecture | 2010 |
| Kim Colin | Product/Furniture Design | 2018 |
| Stuart Craig OBE | Film production design | 2004 |
| Neisha Crosland | Textile design | 2006 |
| Bob Crowley | Theatre and film design | 1997 |
| Mike Dempsey | Graphic design | 1994 |
| Marion Deuchars | Illustration | 2018 |
| Es Devlin OBE | Theatre design | 2018 |
| Eileen Diss | TV and theatre design | 1975 |
| William Dudley | Theatre design | 1988 |
| Sir James Dyson CBE | Engineering design | 2005 |
| Eileen Ellis | Textile design | 1984 |
| Brian Eno | Designing with sound | 2012 |
| Simon Esterson | Graphic design | 2001 |
| Mark Farrow | Graphic design | 2009 |
| Colin Forbes | Graphic design | 1974 |
| Michael Foreman | Illustration | 1985 |
| Nick Foster | Futures Design | 2021 |
| Norman Foster, Baron Foster of Thames Bank | Interior design | 1988 |
| Jenny Frean | Textile design | 1998 |
| John Galliano CBE | Fashion design | 2002 |
| Malcolm Garrett MBE | New media | 2000 |
| Nigel Gee | Engineering design | 2007 |
| David Gentleman | Stamps | 1970 |
| Sir Kenneth Grange CBE | General design | 1969 |
| Andrew Grant | Landscape design | 2012 |
| Fernando Gutiérrez | Graphic Design | 2014 |
| Margaret Hall OBE | Exhibitions | 1974 |
| Geoffrey Harcourt | Furniture design | 1978 |
| George Hardie | Graphic design | 2005 |
| Tim Harvey | TV Production design | 1990 |
| Patrick Head | Engineering design | 1993 |
| Thomas Heatherwick | General design | 2004 |
| Sam Hecht | Production design | 2008 |
| Peter Higgins | Interior design | 2009 |
| David Hillman | Graphic design | 1997 |
| Matthew Hilton | Furniture design | 2004 |
| Richard Hollis | Graphic design | 2005 |
| Margaret Howell | Fashion design | 2007 |
| Richard Hudson | Theatre design | 1999 |
| Barbara Hulanicki | Fashion design | 2009 |
| Martin Hunt | Ceramics and glass | 1981 |
| Nigel Irens | Engineering design | 2005 |
| Alan Irvine | Exhibitions & museum design | 1964 |
| Sir Jonathan Ive KBE | Product design | 2003 |
| Betty Jackson | Fashion design | 1988 |
| Eva Jiřičná | Interior design | 1991 |
| William Neill Johnstone | Textile design | 1989 |
| Stephen Jones OBE | Millinery | 2009 |
| Ben Kelly | Interior design | 2007 |
| Perry King | Product design | 1990 |
| Sarah King | Textile design | 2008 |
| Rodney Kinsman | Furniture design | 1990 |
| Geoffrey Kirk | Engineering design | 2001 |
| Alan Kitching | Graphic design/typography | 1994 |
| Martin Lambie-Nairn | TV graphics | 1987 |
| Roger Law | Graphic design and caricature | 1999 |
| Stefanos Lazaridis | Theatre design | 2003 |
| Sonny Levi | Boat design | 1987 |
| Robin Levien | Ceramics & glass | 1995 |
| David Lewis | Product design | 1995 |
| Tom Lloyd | Production design | 2008 |
| Bernard Lodge | Film and TV graphics | 1982 |
| Ross Lovegrove | Product design | 2003 |
| George Mackie | Book design | 1973 |
| Tim Macfarlane | Structural engineering design | 2004 |
| Mark Major | Designing with light | 2012 |
| Roger Mann | Interior design | 2005 |
| Pearce Marchbank | Graphic design | 2004 |
| John McConnell | Graphic design | 1987 |
| Antony McDonald | Theatre design | 2004 |
| Alex McDowell | Production design | 2006 |
| Sir David McMurtry CBE | Engineering design | 1989 |
| Marshall Meek | Naval architecture | 1986 |
| Tony Meeuwissen | Illustration | 2013 |
| Jasper Morrison CBE | Furniture design | 2001 |
| Colin Mudie | Small craft naval | 1995 |
| Morag Myerscough | Communication design | 2017 |
| John Napier | Theatre & film design | 1996 |
| Marc Newson CBE | General design | 2006 |
| Timothy O'Brien | Theatre design | 1991 |
| Jay Osgerby OBE | Furniture design | 2007 |
| Nick Park CBE | Animation | 2006 |
| Charlie Paton | Engineering design | 2012 |
| John Pawson | Interior design | 2005 |
| Stephen Payne OBE | Engineering design | 2006 |
| Dan Pearson | Landscape design | 2012 |
| Luke Pearson | Product design | 2008 |
| Anthony Powell | Costume design | 1999 |
| Sandy Powell | Costume design | 2013 |
| Mary Quant OBE | Dress design | 1969 |
| Wendy Ramshaw CBE | Jewellery design | 1999 |
| James Randle | Engineering design | 1994 |
| Mary Restieaux | Textile design | 2011 |
| Mike Rawlinson | Information design | 2017 |
| Dame Zandra Rhodes DBE | Fashion and textiles | 1976 |
| Philip Ruffles | Engineering design | 1997 |
| Patrick Rylands | Product design | 1999 |
| Ron Sandford | Illustration | 1989 |
| Peter Saville CBE | Graphic design | 2011 |
| Gerald Scarfe CBE | Illustration | 1989 |
| Arnold Schwartzman OBE | Graphic design | 2006 |
| Sir Paul Smith CBE | Fashion design | 1978 |
| Alan Stanton | Interior design | 2005 |
| Ben Terrett | Service design | 2018 |
| Alan Tye RIBA | Product design | 1986 |
| Georgina von Etzdorf | Textile design | 1995 |
| Stuart Walker | Film and TV design | 1998 |
| Simon Waterfall | Interaction design | 2007 |
| David Watkins | Jewellery design | 2010 |
| Dame Vivienne Westwood DBE | Fashion design | 2001 |
| Raymond Wheeler | Engineering design | 1995 |
| Sarah Wigglesworth | Architecture | 2012 |
| Kim Wilkie | Landscape design | 2009 |
| Paul Williams | Interior design | 2009 |
| Chris Wise | Structural engineering | 1998 |
| Michael Wolff | Graphic design | 2011 |
| Terence Woodgate | Furniture design | 2003 |
| Patrick Woodroffe | Designing with light | 2013 |
| Saeed Zahedi OBE | Engineering design | 2013 |

=== HonRDIs ===
| Name | Category | Year |
|---|---|---|
| April Greiman | Transmedia design | 2025 |
| Philippe Block | Structural design | 2025 |
| Michael Bierut | Graphic design | 2024 |
| Michael Levine | Set and costume design | 2024 |
| Julia Lohmann | Regenerative design | 2024 |
| Clary Salandy | Carnival design | 2024 |
| Stefan Diez | Product design | 2022 |
| Simone Farresin | Design research | 2022 |
| Diébédo Francis Kéré | Architecture | 2022 |
| Andrea Trimarchi | Design research | 2022 |
| Junichi Arai | Textile design | 1987 |
| Fabien Baron | Graphic design | 2000 |
| Mario Bellini | General design | 1991 |
| Manolo Blahnik | Shoe design | 2001 |
| Andrea Branzi | General design | 2008 |
| James Carpenter | Glass design | 2008 |
| Ivan Chermayeff | Graphic design | 1991 |
| Seymour Chwast | Graphic design | 2005 |
| Antonio Citterio | General design | 2007 |
| Kyle Cooper | Film and TV graphics | 2001 |
| Wim Crouwel | Graphic design | 1998 |
| Lidewij Edelkoort | Design forecasting | 2013 |
| Hartmut Esslinger | Product design | 2013 |
| Niels Diffrient | Furniture design | 1987 |
| Sara Fanelli | Illustration | 2006 |
| Dionysis Fotopoulos | Theatre and film design | 1992 |
| Naoto Fukasawa | Product design | 2007 |
| Karl Gerstner | Graphic design | 2006 |
| Konstantin Grcic | Furniture design | 2009 |
| Bob Greenberg | Interaction design | 2012 |
| Kathryn Gustafson | Landscape and gardens | 2001 |
| Armin Hofmann | Illustration | 1968 |
| Knud Holscher | Product design | 2004 |
| Toshio Iwai | Interaction design | 2012 |
| Hella Jongerius | Product design | 2023 |
| Rei Kawakubo | Fashion design | 2001 |
| Friso Kramer | Furniture | 1979 |
| Yrjö Kukkapuro | Furniture design | 2002 |
| Jack Lenor Larsen | Textile design | 1983 |
| Italo Lupi | Graphic design | 2002 |
| Erik Magnussen | Furniture & product | 2001 |
| Enzo Mari | Product design | 2000 |
| Javier Mariscal | General design | 2006 |
| Bruce Mau | Graphic design | 2011 |
| Ingo Maurer | Lighting design | 2005 |
| Alberto Meda | Product design | 2005 |
| Ottavio Missoni | Textile design | 1997 |
| Rosita Missoni | Textile design | 1997 |
| Issey Miyake | Fashion design | 1988 |
| Bruno Monguzzi | Graphic design | 2003 |
| Marcello Morandini | Ceramic design | 2004 |
| Ulf Moritz | Textile design | 2004 |
| Christoph Niemann | Illustration | 2023 |
| Vuokko Nurmesniemi | Fashion and textiles | 1988 |
| Kate Orff | Landscape design | 2023 |
| Piet Oudolf | Landscape design | 2021 |
| Neri Oxman | Bio design | 2021 |
| Sergio Pininfarina | Automotive design | 1983 |
| Mark Pollack | Textile design | 2007 |
| Dieter Rams | Electrical appliances and furniture | 1968 |
| Tomas Roope | Interaction design | 2012 |
| Paula Scher | Graphic design | 2021 |
| Martha Schwartz | Landscape design | 2009 |
| Jean-Jacques Sempé | Illustration | 1989 |
| Maurice Sendak | Illustration | 1986 |
| Erik Spiekermann | Type design | 2007 |
| Marina Tabassum | Architecture | 2021 |
| Roger Tallon | General design | 1973 |
| Piero Tosi | Costume design | 2007 |
| Dries van Noten | Fashion design | 2008 |
| Massimo Vignelli | General design | 1996 |
| Michel Virlogeux | Engineering design | 2006 |
| Yohji Yamamoto | Fashion design | 2006 |
| Sori Yanagi | General design | 2008 |
| Peter Zumthor | Architecture | 2012 |

== Former members ==
=== Past RDIs ===
Past Royal Designers for Industry

- Tony Abbott, Television & theatre design, 1972
- Ken Adam, Film production design, 2009
- Edward Ardizzone, Illustration, 1974
- Hardy Amies, Dress design, 1964
- Edward Abbott, Illustration, 1974
- Jon Bannenberg, Motor yachts, 1978
- Christian Barnard, Transport equipment, 1948
- Edward Bawden, Graphics, 1949
- Gerald Benney, Silversmithing, 1971
- Misha Black, Exhibitions & interiors, 1957
- John Box, Film production design, 1992
- Bill Brandt, Photography, 1978
- William Brown, Bridge design, 1977
- Stefan Buzas, Exhibitions & interiors, 1961
- Reco Capey, General design, 1937
- Andy Cameron, Interactive design, 2011
- Hugh Casson, Exhibitions, 1961
- Achille Castiglioni, General design, 1986
- Hulme Chadwick, Product design, 1974
- Colin Chapman, Automotive design, 1979
- Wells Coates, General design, 1944
- Christopher Cockerell, Engineering design, 1987
- Douglas Cockerell, Bookbinding, 1936
- Susie Cooper, Pottery, 1940
- Kay Cosserat, Textile design, 1986
- Edward Gordon Craig, Stage design, 1937
- Gordon Cullen, Illustration & townscape design, 1975
- Robin Day, Furniture & exhibitions, 1959
- Lucienne Day, Textiles, 1962
- Richard Eckersley, Book design, 1999
- Tom Eckersley, Posters, 1963
- Alan Fletcher, Graphics & publicity design, 1972
- Uffa Fox, Small boats, 1955
- Barnett Freedman, Graphics, 1949
- Roger Furse, Stage & film design, 1949
- Abram Games, Posters, 1959
- James Gardner, Exhibitions, 1947
- J Laurent Giles, Yachts, 1951
- Eric Gill, Typography & wood engraving, 1936
- Robert Goodden, General design, 1947
- Duncan Grant, Printed textiles, 1941
- Eileen Gray, Furniture & interiors, 1972
- Milner Gray, Packaging, 1937
- E W Grieve, Shop window display, 1940
- Jacqueline Groag, Textile design, 1964
- Edmund Happold, Engineering design, 1983
- Geoffrey de Havilland, Aircraft, 1944
- Ashley Havinden, Graphics, 1947
- Lionel Haworth, Engineering design, 1976
- Ambrose Heal, Furniture, 1939
- F H K Henrion, Packaging & graphics, 1959
- Jocelyn Herbert, Theatre & cinema design, 1971
- Robert Heritage, Furniture, 1963
- George Him, Graphic design, 1977
- James Hogan, Glass & stained glass, 1936
- Paul Hogarth, Illustration, 1979
- Charles Holden, Transport equipment, 1943
- Jack Howe, Products and industrial equipment, 1961
- Allen Hutt, Typographic & Newspaper design, 1970
- James Irvine, Product design, 2004
- Laurence Irving, date tbc
- Alec Issigonis, Motor cars, 1964
- Ralph Koltai, Theatre design, 1984
- Natasha Kroll, Shop display and television design, 1966
- Lynton Lamb, Book design & illustration, 1974
- Osbert Lancaster, Illustration, 1979
- Margaret Leischner, Textiles, 1969
- Richard Levin, Television design, 1971
- Noel London, Engineering product design, 1973
- William Lyons, Motor cars, 1964
- Ethel Mairet, Woven textiles, 1937 (first woman)
- Eric de Maré, Photography, 1997
- Enid Marx, Pattern design, 1944
- J H Mason, 1936
- James McNeill, Ships, 1950
- David Mellor, Silver, cutlery & lighting, 1962
- Percy Metcalfe, Medals & coinage, 1937
- Francis Meynell, Typography, 1940
- Bill Moggridge, Product design, 1988
- Edward Molyneux, Dress, 1950
- Stanley Morison, Type design & typography, 1960
- Alastair Morton, textiles, 1960
- Alex Moulton, Engineering Products, 1968
- Jean Muir, Dress design, 1972
- H G Murphy, Goldsmithing, 1936
- Keith Murray, Glass, pottery & silver, 1936
- Charles Nicholson, Yachts, 1944
- Julia Trevelyan Oman, Theatre & film design, 1977
- Brian O'Rorke, Interiors, 1939
- Eric Carlton Ottaway, Road passenger vehicles, 1949
- Derek Prime, Engineering design, 1982
- Ian Proctor, Boats & small craft, 1969
- Tom Purvis, Commercial art, 1936
- Ernest Race, Furniture, 1953
- A B Read, Light fittings, 1940
- A A Rubbra, Engineering design, 1977
- Gordon Russell, Furniture, 1940
- R D Russell, Furniture, 1944
- Hans Schleger, Exhibition display & packaging, 1959
- Hans Schmoller, Typography, 1976
- Douglas Scott, Industrial designer, 1974
- Ronald Searle, Illustration, 1991
- George Sheringham, Interior decoration & textiles, 1936
- Peter Simpson, Woven Textile design, 1974
- Percy Delf Smith, Lettering, 1940
- Antony Armstrong-Jones, 1st Earl of Snowdon, Photography, 1986
- Basil Spence, Exhibitions & interiors, 1960
- Herbert Spencer, Typography, 1965
- Harold Stabler, Pottery, Enamelling & silversmithing, 1936
- Richard Stevens, Product design, 1973
- Reynolds Stone, Lettering, 1956
- Marianne Straub, Woven textiles, 1972
- Derek Sugden, Engineering design, 2009
- Fred Taylor, Graphics, 1936
- Philip Thompson, Graphics & illustration, 1997
- Walter Tracy, Type design, 1973
- Howard Upjohn, Engineering product design, 1973
- C F A Voysey, Interior decoration, furniture & fabrics, 1936
- Barnes Wallis, Aircraft, 1943
- Allan Walton, Printed textiles, 1940
- Neville Ward, Interior design & ship interiors, 1971
- John Waterer, Leather Goods, 1953
- Hans Wegner, Furniture, 1969
- Robert Welch, Product design & silversmithing, 1965
- Frank Whittle, Engineering design, 1985
- Berthold Wolpe, Typefaces & lettering, 1959
- Anna Zinkeisen, Graphics & mural painting, 1940

=== Past Honorary RDIs ===
Past Honorary Royal Designers for Industry

- Edward McKnight Kauffer, Commercial art, 1936
- Alvar Aalto, General design, 1947
- Franco Albini, Interiors, exhibitions & furniture, 1971
- Gordon Andrews, General design, 1987
- Saul Bass, Film & TV graphics, 1964
- Herbert Bayer, Graphic design, 1984
- Richard Buckminster Fuller, Architecture & design, 1980
- Nanna Ditzel, Product design, 1996
- Charles Eames, Furniture, exhibitions & interiors, 1960
- Jean-Michel Folon, Illustration, 1981
- André François, Graphics 1974
- Shigeo Fukada, Graphic design, 1986
- Alexander Girard, Interiors, exhibitions & furnishing textiles, 1965
- Walter Gropius, General design, 1947
- Edward Hald, Glass, 1939
- Walter Herdeg, Graphic design, 1976
- Christian Joachim, Pottery, 1939
- CL 'Kelly' Johnson, Aircraft design, 1984
- Finn Juhl, Furniture & interiors, 1978
- Dora Jung, Woven textiles, 1979
- Kaare Klint, Furniture, 1949
- Takashi Kono, Graphics, 1983
- Raymond Loewy, General design, 1939
- Vico Magistretti, General design, 1992
- Pierre Mendell, Graphic design, 1999
- Bruno Mathsson, Furniture, 1978
- Herbert Matter, Graphics & photography, 1982
- Norman McLaren, Film Animation, 1986
- Børge Mogensen, Furniture, 1972
- Josef Muller-Brockmann, Graphic design, 1988
- George Nelson, General design, 1973
- Marcello Nizzoli, Typewriters & calculating machines, 1961
- Antti Nurmesniemi, General design, 1986
- Sigurd Persson, General design, 1987
- Battista Farina, Motor cars, 1954
- Paul Rand, Graphics, 1973
- Steen Eiler Rasmussen, General design, 1947
- Astrid Sampe, Textile design, 1949
- WHJB Sandberg, Exhibition & museum display, typography, 1971
- Timo Sarpaneva, Pottery & textiles, 1963
- Carlo Scarpa, Exhibitions, interiors & museum design, 1969
- Saul Steinberg, Illustration, 1980
- Olin Stephens, Yacht design, 1975
- Josef Svoboda, Theatre design, 1989
- Ilmari Tapiovaara, Furniture, 1969
- Walter Dorwin Teague, General design, 1951
- Henryk Tomaszewski, Graphics, 1975
- Roland Topor, Illustration, 1988
- Jan Tschichold, Typography & book design, 1965
- Dame Vivienne Westwood DBE, Fashion design, 2001
- Tapio Wirkkala, Glass, wood & silver, 1964
- Henry Wolf, Graphic design, 1990
- Hermann Zapf, Type Design, 1985
- Piet Zwart, Typography, 1966
