= Georgina von Etzdorf =

British textile designer (born 1955)

Georgina von Etzdorf RDI
- Born: January 1, 1955 (age 71); Lima, Peru
- Education: Camberwell School of Art
- Known for: Textile design

Georgina von Etzdorf (RDI) (born 1 January 1955) is a British textile designer whose eponymous fashion label was renowned for its luxurious velvet scarves and clothing accessories.

== Early life ==
Etzdorf was born in 1955 in Lima, Peru, to a Prussian father and an English mother. She lived in Peru until the age of five, when her family returned to Britain. She has often claimed that her early years in Peru strongly influenced her dynamic sense of colour and texture.

Etzdorf studied textile design at Camberwell School of Art in London, graduating in 1977. At Camberwell she met Martin Simcock, who later joined her as one of the co-founders and partners of the Georgina von Etzdorf label. The third co-founder and partner was Jonathan Docherty, who studied industrial design at the Central School of Art and Design in London and who had been a school friend of Simcock's

== Career ==
Etzdorf spent several years as a freelance designer before she, Simcock, and Docherty founded the Georgina von Etzdorf Partnership in 1981, basing themselves originally in a garage and stable at Etzdorf's parents' house, where they set up a silk screen printing workshop. Their plan was originally to produce fabric for third-party fashion houses, but they took the decision to produce in-house because of their failure to find commercial printers willing to adapt their processes to the challenge of printing Etzdorf's designs.

In 1984 the Georgina von Etzdorf fashion label made its first appearance at the autumn London Designer shows previewing accessories, scarves and ties. In 1985, the partnership produced its first full clothing collection. In 1986 Georgina von Etzdorf opened a first London shop in Burlington Arcade, and a second 1988 on Sloane Street in Chelsea. By the mid-1990s the company was selling in 400 shops in 25 countries around the world, and had a concession in both Barney's in New York and Selfridges in London. In addition to its signature scarves and ties, the company diversified into a wide range of men's and women's wear, such as dinner jackets, dressing gowns, sleepwear, shoes, gloves, belts, hats, and also household items such as kelims and cushions.

As the company expanded its product range it also entered into an increasing number of collaborations, including hats with Gabriella Ligenza, shoes with Emma Hope and rugs with Christopher Farr.

Although known for its velvet scarves – which used velvet as daywear – Georgina von Etzdorf also printed and experimented with texture and technique on fabrics such as textured chiffon and organza, mohair, fine cashmeres, satin, rayon fur, chenille and wool boucle as well as using techniques such as devore, laser printing, and leather and plastic printing.

Georgina von Etzdorf products have been worn and sought after by rock stars and royalty. On one occasion, the EMI record label in the UK gave 58 of its key artists – including The Rolling Stones, Janet Jackson, Robbie Williams and the Pet Shop Boys - Georgina von Etzdorf dressing gowns for Christmas. Diana, Princess of Wales was famously photographed wearing a Donald Campbell dress made from Etzdorf's Poppy design.

== Awards ==
Etzdorf was appointed a Royal Designer for Industry (RDI) by the Royal Society of Arts in 1997.

In 1996 she was awarded an honorary Doctorate of Design by Winchester School of Art. She was made an Honorary Fellow of the University of the Arts, London in 1999.

Among many industry awards are the BBC Radio 4 Enterprise Award for Small Businesses (1984), British Apparel Export Award (1986), the Manchester Prize for Art and Industry, British Gas Award (1988). In 2006 the company was honoured by a 25-year retrospective exhibition at Manchester City Art Gallery.

== Personal ==
In her spare time Etzdorf is a ukulele player. She is also a supporter and participant in the Singing for the Brain project, instigated and developed by the Alzheimer's Society.

In February 2011, Etzdorf was one of a group of designers asked to design and furnish a bedouin-style tent set up at the Eden Project in Cornwall, to publicise the work of the charity Shelterbox, which provides emergency shelter and disaster relief.
