= International Society for Prosthetics and Orthotics =

- Formation: 1970
- Founder: Knud Bunsen, Jǿrgen Kjǿlbye, Colin A. McLaurin, Anthony McQuirk, D.S. McKenzie, Anthony Staros, George Murdoch, A. Bennett Wilson Jr., André Bähler, Götz Kuhn
- Website: www.ispoint.org

The International Society for Prosthetics and Orthotics (ISPO) is a non-governmental organization of people working in or interested in prosthetics, orthotics, mobility and assistive devices technology.

It was founded in 1970 in Copenhagen, Denmark by a committee chaired by Knud Jansen. It currently has about 3,500 members in over 100 countries.

ISPO, in partnership with the World Health Organization (WHO) has developed the WHO Standards for Prosthetics and Orthotics that were launched in May 2017 at the 16th World Congress of the International Society of Prosthetics and Orthotics (ISPO) in Cape Town, South Africa.

ISPO is also responsible for Prosthetics and Orthotics International, an academic journal that quarterly publishes papers related to Prothetics and Orthotics.

== Accreditation & Training ==
ISPO grants accreditation to Prosthetic and Orthotic Schools that meet the threshold expectation of quality for training of Prosthetics and Orthotics. Some ISPO accreditated prosthetic and orthotics programmes include;

No.	Institution	Country/ Region	Category
1.	Afghan Diploma for Prosthetics and Orthotics (ADPO)	Afghanistan	Associate Prosthetist/Orthotist
2.	American Board for Certification in Orthotics and Prosthetics (ABC)	United States	Prosthetist/ Orthotist
3.	Bangladesh Health Professions Institute (BHPI)	Bangladesh	Associate Prosthetist/Orthotist
4.	Beijing College of Social Administration (BCSA)	China	Prosthetist/ Orthotist
5.	Bundesfachschule für Orthopädie-Technik (BUFA)	Germany	Prosthetist/Orthotist
6.	Cambodian School of Prosthetics and Orthotics (CSPO)	Cambodia	Prosthetic/ Orthotic Technician
7.	Cambodian School of Prosthetics and Orthotics (CSPO)	Cambodia	Associate Prosthetist/Orthotist
8.	Capital Medical University (CMU)	China	Prosthetist/Orthotist
9.	Ecole Nationale des Auxiliaires Médicaux (ENAM)	Togo	Associate Prosthetist/Orthotist
10.	Erbil Polytechnic University	Iraq	Prosthetist/Orthotist
11.	Faculty of Medicine and Health Sciences, Sana'a University	Yemen	Prosthetist/Orthotist
12.	Fontys University of Applied Sciences	Netherlands	Prosthetist/Orthotist
13.	Hong Kong Polytechnic University (HKPU)	Hong Kong	Prosthetist/Orthotist
14.	Human Study School of Rehabilitation Sciences	Worldwide	Associate Prosthetist/Orthotist
15.	Human Study School of Rehabilitation Sciences	Worldwide	Prosthetist/Orthotist
16.	Human Study School of Rehabilitation Sciences	Worldwide	Prosthetic/ Orthotic Technician
17.	International O&P School	Germany	Single Discipline
18.	Jakarta School of Prosthetics and Orthotics (JSPO)	Indonesia	Prosthetist/Orthotist
19.	Jönköping University, School of Health And Welfare	Sweden	Prosthetist/Orthotist
20.	Kobe College of Medical Welfare (KCMW)	Japan	Prosthetist/Orthotist
21.	Kunming Medical University (KMU)	China	Prosthetist/ Orthotist
22.	Mobility India (MI), Rehabilitation Research and Training Centre	India	Prosthetist/ Orthotist
23.	National Centre for Prosthetics and Orthotics, Department of Biomedical Engineering, University of Strathclyde (NCPO)	United Kingdom	Prosthetist/ Orthotist
24.	Orthotics Prosthetics Canada (OPC) - Pathway	Canada	Prosthetist/ Orthotist
25.	Pakistan Institute of Prosthetic and Orthotic Sciences (PIPOS)	Pakistan	Associate Prosthetist/Orthotist
26.	Private Fachhochschule Göttingen (PFH)	Germany	Prosthetist/ Orthotist
27.	Sirindhorn School of Prosthetics and Orthotics (SSPO)	Thailand	Prosthetist/ Orthotist
28.	Städtische Meisterschule für Orthopädietechnik München (MSOT)	Germany	Prosthetist/ Orthotist
29.	Tanzania Training Centre for Orthopaedic Technologists (TATCOT)	Tanzania	Associate Prosthetist/Orthotist
30.	Tshwane university of Technology	South Africa	Prosthetist/ Orthotist
31.	Universidad Don Bosco (UDB) – Diploma in Orthopedic Technology	El Salvador	Associate Prosthetist/Orthotist
32.	University of Rwanda (UR)	Rwanda	Associate Prosthetist/Orthotist
33.	University of the East Ramon Magsaysay Memorial Medical Center Inc.- College of Allied Rehabilitation Sciences, Philippine School of Prosthetics and Orthotics (PSPO)	Philippines	Prosthetist/ Orthotist
