= DAKS =

British luxury fashion house

DAKS Simpson Group plc
- Industry: Fashion
- Founded: City of London, England (1894)
- Founder: Simeon Simpson
- Headquarters: London, UK; Japan
- Key people: Paul Dimond (deputy chairman); Luigi Veccia (creative director)
- Products: Clothing; Accessories
- Owner: Sankyo Seiko Co. Limited (since 1991)
- Website: www.daks.com

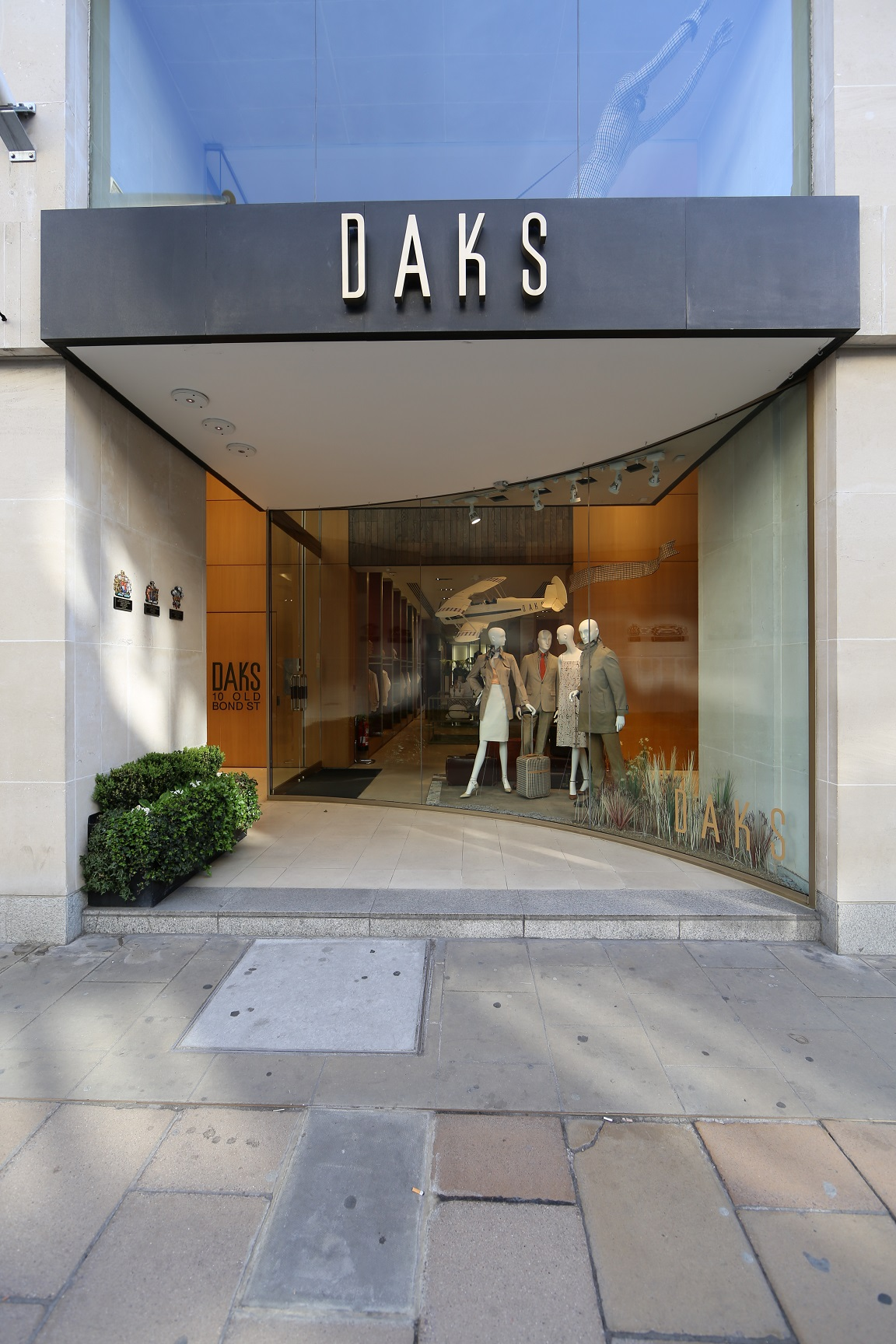
DAKS flagship store on 10 Old Bond Street

Looks from DAKS' SS13 shows

DAKS is a British luxury fashion house, founded in 1894 by Simeon Simpson in London. It is one of only 15 firms (out of 820) to have held royal warrants from three members of the Royal Family. Officially granted to DAKS' Simpson Piccadilly store in 1956 was the royal warrant of Prince Philip, Duke of Edinburgh, followed by that of the Queen in 1962 and Charles, Prince of Wales in 1982.

Worldwide, DAKS is exported to 30 countries and sold in over 2,000 speciality shops, major stores and concessions. Since 1991 the company is owned by Sankyo Seiko Co. Limited.

== Name DAKS ==
The name DAKS was introduced in 1935 for Simpson's new line of self-supporting trouser, and later expanded to suits. While the company always used all caps for its trade mark name, others often wrote it Daks. Various stories for the origin of the name exist. Ashley Havinden, who worked on the brand's typeface, recalled in 1955 that the original name proposed was "Vacs", from vacation wear; the V was changed to D as it sounded stronger, and the C to K because it looked stronger. David Wainwright's 1996 official history says DAKS is a combination of the initials of Alexander Simpson and an initial and final letter of his business associate Dudley Beck, altered from DABS. The company website links the brand to the Australian English slang "daks", meaning trousers or underpants, widely interpreted as a blend of "dad slacks", an association Wainwright ascribes to marketer Bill Crawford.

== History ==
=== Early years – S Simpson ===
In 1894 Simeon Simpson, aged 16, rented a room on Middlesex Street, East London, with the intention of setting up a business in bespoke tailoring, focused on high standard craftsmanship. Several innovations of technology at the time were being introduced with machinery capable of making buttonholes and electric powered saws to cut many layers of fabric at once; Simpson saw the potential for such equipment for producing garments in higher quantities while still upholding quality tailoring techniques, aiming to improve ready-to-wear standards as no male or female professionals considered ready-to-wear to be suitable attire at the time. Simpson's methods proved successful in speeding up the process and he set up several factories within London, which soon required expansion in its early years through popularity of the label.

Alexander Simpson, his second son, joined the business aged 15 in 1917, and by 1929 had planned and opened a larger factory in Stoke Newington where production could be centralised, this again had to be enlarged a few years later.

=== 20th century – DAKS and Simpsons Piccadilly ===
With the continued growth of the company Alexander Simpson began to take more control of the business, and in 1935 DAKS tailored the first self-supporting trouser. The trousers were available in many colours and fabrics that weren't generally associated with menswear. Soon after a DAKS womenswear line was released, using the patented waistband for skirting.

At the turn of the 21st century when the company was acquired by Japanese group Sankyo Seiko Co. Limited in 1991, the S Simpson name was dropped and DAKS became the new brand name.

The ease-of-wear of the trousers and how they allowed movement, as intended from Simpson's invention, led to DAKS being popular in sporting wear: kitting tennis, golf, motor racing and football players, and even for the British Olympic team in 1960. The company was commissioned by the British Government at the time of the Second World War to produce military uniforms for officers in the Army, Navy, Royal Air Force and Women's Services. Despite the semi-destruction of the Stoke Newington factory due to bomb damage and loss of electricity seven million garments were made for the military.

After the war, DAKS started selling to the public again. Queues of people would form along Piccadilly. Simpson tailors would measure them in the line, and present suitable pairs of trousers to them when they arrived in the Simpsons of Piccadilly store.

==== Simpsons of Piccadilly ====
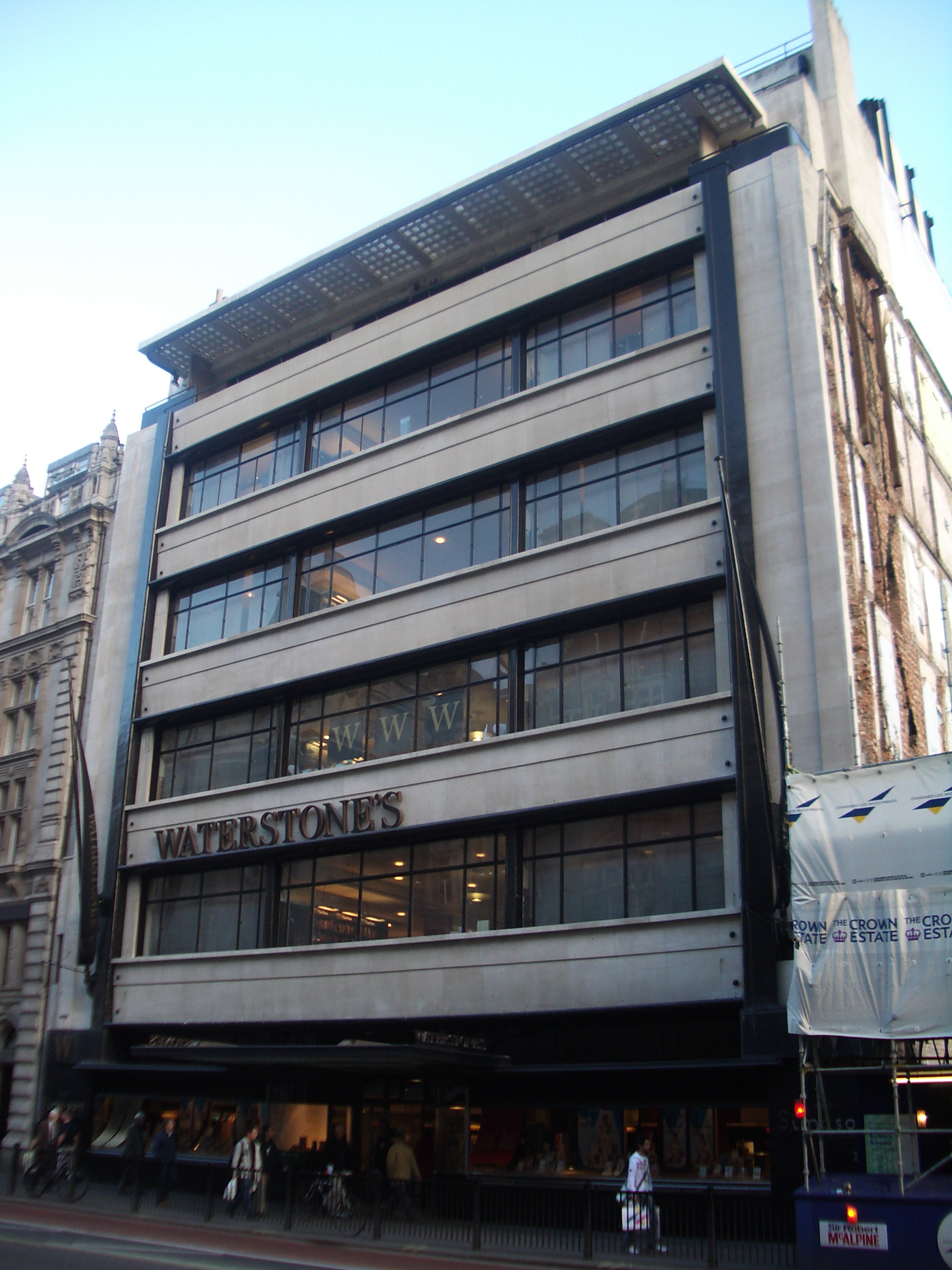
Simpsons of Piccadilly

Simeon Simpson's son Alexander Simpson founded Simpsons of Piccadilly. The new building was designed by architect Joseph Emberton as a new and revolutionary retail establishment, the shop front windows exhibited the first curved glass display in Great Britain and the largest in the world at the time, these were designed so that no reflection would be cast to obscure the displays inside. The store opened in April 1936 by Sir Malcolm Campbell, the world-famous motor-racing driver. and was known for its visual merchandising and window displays by László Moholy-Nagy, a former director from the Bauhaus school. Alexander Simpson died the following year of leukaemia aged just 34.

Simpsons continued to trade in the Simpsons Piccadilly building for several decades more, helping officers and civilians during World War II, and in later years branched out to sell other clothing by designer labels such as Armani and Christian Dior Since 1999 Simpsons stopped trading at the Piccadilly store and moved the renamed DAKS to a new flagship store and London offices on Old Bond Street, whilst moving to another new store on Jermyn Street which was refurbished in 2012 to focus on selling classic menswear. The original store was sold to bookseller Waterstone's and is now their flagship store.

== Royal warrants and house check ==
HRH The Duke of Edinburgh visited the company's factory at Strutherhill in Larkhall, Scotland (now demolished) in recognition of its role in exporting goods worldwide.

Larkhall was built in 1948 to Simpson's specifications and was opened by Harold Wilson. The factory since closed in the early 2000s. DAKS was granted the Royal Warrant of Appointment by HRH The Duke of Edinburgh in 1956. Her Majesty The Queen and HRH The Prince of Wales granted the company with royal warrants in 1962 and 1982 respectively.

The company developed a house check in 1976 by Johnny Mengers, the Group managing director of the time and last family chairman.

== See also ==
- Savile Row tailoring
