= Malcolm Ashworth =

British army and intelligence officer

- Born: 14 November 1925; Wandsworth, London, England
- Died: 7 April 1978 (aged 52); Wandsworth, London, England
- Relatives: Henry Ashworth; Sir John Wyndham; Wadham Wyndham; Wadham Wyndham; Wadham Wyndham; Charles à Court Repington; King Edward I
- Military career
- Allegiance: United Kingdom
- Branch: British Army
- Service years: 1943 – 1952
- Rank: Captain
- Units: Devonshire Regiment; Gloucestershire Regiment
- Conflicts: World War II; Malayan Emergency
- Awards: Mentioned in Despatches
- Other work: Marketing pioneer

Malcolm Stanley Wyndham Ashworth MBIM MCIM (14 November 1925 – 7 April 1978) was a decorated British army officer and intelligence officer, who is also regarded as the leading figure in the establishment of marketing as a professional discipline in the UK. He is credited with having saved Crawford's Advertising Agency, arguably the most important British advertising agency of the first half of the 20th century, from financial failure in the late 1960s while acting as chairman and chief executive.

== Biography ==
Malcolm Ashworth was the son of Kathleen (née Wyndham Little) the great-granddaughter of Wadham Wyndham and Arthur Broad Ashworth, scion of an ancient Lancastrian family. Ashworth was educated at St Boniface's College in Devon, where he was House Captain (Wyndham), Captain of the First XI and Captain of the First XV, and at the Indian Military Academy, Dehradun. He matriculated at the University of Edinburgh in 1943 but abandoned taking a degree in favour of military service.

== Military service ==
Ashworth volunteered for the British Army on 15 June 1943 aged 17, having served with the 13th Devon (Totnes) Battalion Home Guard until he had completed his school education and reached the minimum volunteering age. He was one of only 710 British officers granted a full King's Commission from the Indian Military Academy and served as a lieutenant and then captain in the Devonshire Regiment and Gloucestershire Regiment during and after World War II in India, Burma and Malaya (Mentioned in Despatches).

While serving with the 1st Devons in Malaya in 1948 Ashworth succeeded Captain Michael Bullock (later Lieutenant-Colonel Michael Bullock OBE DL officer commanding the Devonshire and Dorset Regiment) as Battalion Intelligence Officer (IO GSOIII) and was placed in charge of intelligence gathering and analysis in the Kluang area, specifically monitoring Malayan Communist Party guerrillas during the Malayan Emergency. He retired from active service in 1952 and was placed on the Regimental Reserve until resigning his commission in 1958 when the Devonshire Regiment amalgamated with the Dorset Regiment.

== Post-war career ==
Upon entering a career in the relatively new discipline of Marketing in 1953, Ashworth's promotion was rapid, becoming Director of Marketing for Quaker Oats in 1957, Marketing Director of Revlon in 1961, and then returning to Quaker Oats in 1964. It was as Marketing Director of Quaker that in 1968 Ashworth conceived the idea of engaging celebrity chef Sir Clement Freud to promote the dog food Minced Morsels (later Chunky). He appointed Collett Dickenson Pearce to produce what became a landmark television advertising campaign which saw Quaker's dog food become the market leader almost overnight and turned Freud into a household name.

Along with figures such as Professor Neil Borden at Harvard Business School, Ashworth is regarded as a leading figure in growing recognition for Marketing as a professional discipline, and is regarded the most influential marketing professional of his time in the UK. He was instrumental in what he termed "the marketing revolution" of the 1960s, which he compared to the professional evolution of advertising in the 1950s. In his introduction to 'A Consuming Passion', the first book ever published on Marketing as a career, he noted that historically many people had "become marketers as a result of happy chance, or had, in fact, been doing a marketing job for our companies without really knowing it." He contrasted this to the new era of Marketing where while "there are no recognised academic qualifications which ensure success in marketing ... success in such a challenging situation demands intellectual ability, imagination and determination of a high order."

In 1968 Ashworth's career evolved from marketing rôles to the management of a leading advertising agency when he succeeded Sir Hubert Oughton, a director since 1929, as chairman and chief executive of the creatively influential but financially ailing Crawford's Advertising Agency founded by Sir William S Crawford in 1914. In the following year he masterminded the merger with Dorland, which is credited as having saved the agency from financial collapse, and Crawford's was still operating under its original name until 1985, latterly as the Crawford Hall Partnership. It became part of Saatchi & Saatchi in the early 1980s.

Following the rescue of Crawford's, in 1970 Ashworth's turnaround capabilities were sought as Deputy Managing Director of Overmark Smith Warden, another important but financially embattled UK advertising agency. His initial success in taking the company towards profitability saw him become the agency's chairman in 1973; however, ultimately the debts of the business proved too great an obstacle, and in January 1976 he put the company into receivership and resigned from the board once the receivers had managed to find a buyer for the agency which operated until 1983.

Ashworth continued to maintain his passion for marketing throughout this time, and was Speaker on Marketing at the University of Liverpool throughout the 1970s until shortly before his untimely death in 1978. During this time he authored numerous articles on marketing as well as advertising.

== Politics ==
Ashworth was by conviction a centrist and one-nation conservative who was motivated to become politically active in order to defend community interests, both in his native west country and in London. His primary concerns were issues affecting children, the elderly and road safety, and campaigning for better provision through local government services.

In 1973 he stood as an independent Centre Party candidate in the Hammersmith and Fulham Greater London Council Election in order to highlight the borough's road safety issues, having identified that too few pedestrian crossings were provided to keep pace with increasing traffic volume and speed. He was for many years a Trustee of the Sir William Powell's Almshouses in Fulham, London which were founded in 1680.

== Ancestry and family ==
Malcolm Stanley Wyndham Ashworth was a direct descendant of the Ashworths of Ashworth, a Lancastrian family tracing its lineage in the male line back to 1170 and one of the oldest families in England.

In 1957 Ashworth married Ingeborg Laufs, younger daughter of Heinrich Laufs and Antonia (née von Welck, a natural descendant of Karl Wolfgang Maximilian, Baron von Welck) and had one son, Alexander Ashworth, who followed his father into marketing. Malcolm Ashworth assumed the additional name of Wyndham on his father's death in 1977 in compliance with the terms of a bequest emanating from his grandmother's family (Alice Wyndham having been the last living member of her branch of the Wyndham family left in England).

Malcolm Ashworth died unexpectedly at the height of his career in 1978, aged 52, as the result of a cerebral haemorrhage and other complications arising from his war wounds.
