= Margaret Sangster =

Margaret Sangster may refer to:

- Margaret Elizabeth Sangster (1838-1912), American poet and author
- Margaret Sangster (radio writer) (1894-1981), American scriptwriter
- Margaret Havinden (1895-1974, née Sangster), British advertising executive
