= Marion Jean Lyon =

British Advertising Executive for 'Punch' Magazine

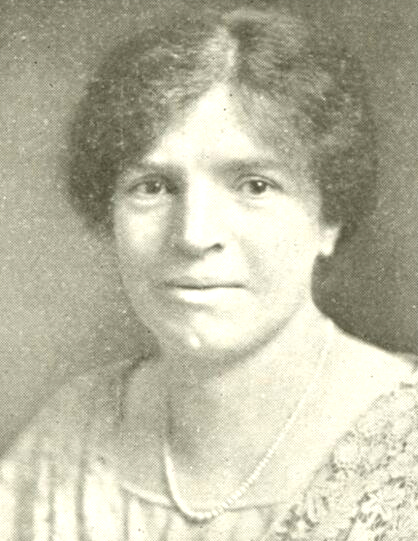
Marion Jean Lyon in the Advertisers Weekly in 1924

Marion Jean Lyon (married name Raven-Hill; 15 January 1885 – 20 February 1940) was a British advertising executive, particularly known for her long association with the magazine Punch (1910–40), as its advertising manager from 1922 – the first woman advertising manager of a major British periodical. She was the founding president of the Women's Advertising Club of London and a director of the feminist literary magazine, Time and Tide.

== Early life ==
Lyon was born on 15 January 1885 in Townhead, Strathaven, Lanarkshire, Scotland, to Marion (née Young) and Andrew Wallace Lyon, a solicitor. She had three sisters and two brothers. She worked in Glasgow before moving to London by 1906, where she initially worked at Remington & Co.

== Advertising career ==
Lyon's first advertising job was at the Paul E. Derrick agency. She moved to Punch in 1910, in the role of assistant to the advertising manager, Roy V. Somerville, and assumed more responsibility than was usual because of his ill health. In 1921, she was promoted to assistant advertising manager, and on Somerville's death the following year, became the advertising manager of Punch. She was the first woman advertising manager of a Fleet Street periodical, or of any major British publication. Her appointment was noted in a letter to The Spectator, which described the position as "one of the most important and highly paid in Fleet Street". Under her leadership, the publication's advertising revenue increased.

She was one of the founding members of the Advertising Association of Women and – after this had either expanded to include other industries or become defunct – in 1923, was one of nineteen founding members, and first president, of the Women's Advertising Club of London. Other founding members included Jessie Reynolds (later chair of the Samson Clark agency) and Margaret and Florence Sangster (at W. S. Crawford's). The impetus for the club's foundation was to prepare for a major international convention on advertising in Wembley, planned for 1924 as part of the British Empire Exhibition. Ethel Wilson took over as WACL President as Lyon was also on the executive council of the convention. During the convention, she hosted an event at the Savoy Hotel on 13 July 1924, with more than 400 women in the advertising business from various countries, and was the welcoming speaker; her speech was covered in The Times and The Daily Telegraph, as well as specialist publications such as Advertising World and Advertiser's Weekly. After the Wembley convention, the club continued to foster women sharing expertise with each other, for example, organising an all-woman session at the male-dominated Advertising Association's annual conventions, and worked to increase the profile of women in advertising.

In 1929, she was one of the few women to speak at the International Advertising Association convention in Berlin. She spoke about opportunities for women in Britain, and was quoted as saying "Women by self-education, by realization of their responsibilities, by adaptability, are winning their way to the forefront in almost every sphere of modern life."

== Other roles and personal life ==
Lyon joined the board of directors of the feminist literary magazine, Time and Tide, in 1926. Its owner, the prominent feminist Margaret, Lady Rhondda, considered Lyon to be very able. The academic Catherine Clay speculates that Lyon was a factor in increasing the magazine's advertising revenue by the end of that decade. Through the magazine, Lyon met several prominent women writers, including Cicely Hamilton and E. M. Delafield. Lyon was also associated with the Business and University Committee, a body founded by Lady Rhondda and Caroline Spurgeon that aimed to improve recruitment of female university graduates. She was a committee member of the Women's Provisional Club, also founded by Lady Rhondda, in 1925–27.

On 20 October 1923, she married the Punch cartoonist, Leonard Raven-Hill (1867–1942), a substantially older man whose first wife had died eighteen months earlier. Unusually, she not only continued to work, but kept on using her maiden name professionally. Lyon died on 20 February 1940 in Bournemouth, after becoming ill the previous year. Her memorial service was held at St Columba's Church in Knightsbridge, London. Her papers are archived at the British Library.

She was described during her lifetime by Advertiser's Weekly as "one of the best-known and best-liked women in advertising". A colleague wrote after her death that Lyon made advertising appear "a gentlemanly thing in the richest sense of that mishandled word". In a 1957 history of Punch, she is referred to as being "still remembered with awe and discomfort, as one of the first women to blast their way into the advertising world and to rule over the clients as firmly as the Editor ruled over the contributors".
