= Ben - Support for Life =

Ben
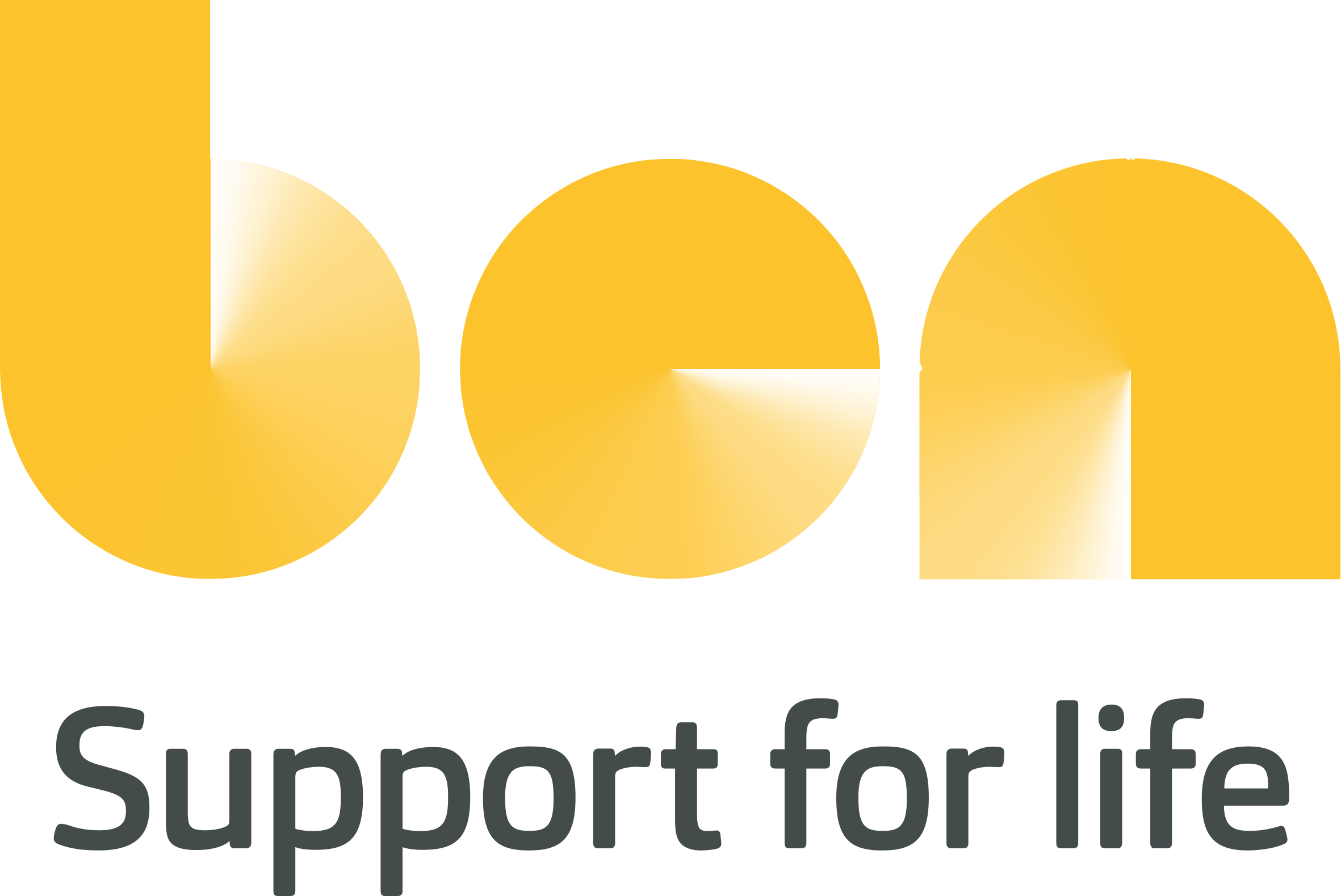
- Founded: 1905
- Founder: Arthur James Wilson
- Type: NGO
- Registration no.: England & Wales (no.297877); Scotland (no.SC039842)

Ben is a not-for-profit organisation that partners with the UK's automotive industry to provide support for life to its people and their families. Everyone who works, or has worked, in the automotive sector can access Ben's confidential, free support services for themselves and their family dependants, no matter what stage of life they are at.

It aims to help the industry by improving the health and wellbeing of its workforce, reducing absence, improving productivity and raising morale.

Ben also provides care for those in later life at its care centres, in their own homes and, for the more independent, at its retirement village, Lynwood Village.

== Support services ==
Ben provides information, advice and guidance by telephone, online and in person. It can also provide managed referrals to its network of over 700 specialist partner organisations, including debt advisors and mental health charities.

== History ==
Ben was founded in 1905 by Arthur James Wilson, a cycling journalist and racer, as well as advertising manager for Dunlop. He was also co-designer of the first ever tandem bicycle. Arthur persuaded a number of leaders from the cycling industry to join him in setting up a fund to help people in the sector, called the Cycle Trades Benevolent Fund. Three years later, the fund was extended to include funding for the automotive industry.

In 1921, the fund purchased its first building – Willoughby House in South East London. The house was initially used as an orphanage to care for children who lost their parents in the First World War. In 1939, it was closed due to the London evacuation and sold to the Salvation Army for use as a training centre.

The first of Ben's current care homes – Lynwood House in Sunninghill, Berkshire – was bought in 1947 for £16,000. Set in 19 acres of grounds, it provided a home for 25 retired fund members. The Birch Hill centre in Northumberland opened as a holiday and convalescent centre in 1969 and was redeveloped as a residential centre during the 1980s. Town Thorns, its care centre in Warwickshire, opened its doors in 1991 and the Workplace Day Care Centre in Coventry opened in 1997.

In 1988 the fund's constitution was amended to include all employees in the automotive manufacturing industry.

== Recent changes ==
In 2013 construction began on the Lynwood Care Centre (the original building had become dilapidated beyond economic repair) and Retirement Village, which officially opened in 2015. Lynwood Village won the ‘What House Award for Best Retirement Development 2015’ and the ‘UK Over 50s Housing Award for Most Outstanding Retirement Village 2015’. It was also shortlisted for the ‘Pinders Healthcare Design Award for Best Independent Living/Care Complex 2016’

Ben structures its support around the four main "pillars" of people's health and wellbeing; financial, mental, physical and social. Launched in 2015 the four pillars are used to highlight the areas in which Ben can provide support.

In 2016 the organisation launched an automotive jobs board, UKAutomotive.jobs. The profits from this website go towards funding Ben.
