= Mar C. Llop =

Spanish photographer and LGBT activist (1967–2022)

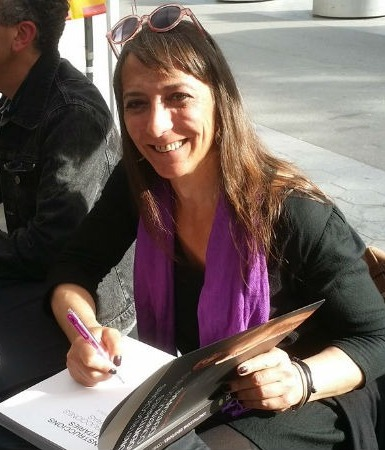
- Llop in 2022
- Born: Mar Capilla Llop; July 3, 1967; Barcelona, Francoist Spain
- Died: February 25, 2022 (aged 54)

Mar Capilla Llop (July 3, 1967 – February 25, 2022) was a Spanish photographer and activist who worked in the Catalan association of transgender people called Generem.

== Biography and career ==
She studied photography at the Institute of Photographic Studies of Catalonia from 1981 to 1986, and video production at the Image Center from 1987 to 1988. She set up her first studio in 1996. Since then, she has worked in publishing and advertising, and specialized in interior design, architecture, fashion, and portraiture.

From 2013 until her death, she developed the project Constrcciones identitarias Work in progress on gender diversity. Several media have echoed the project, as it was exhibited at the Center for Photography and Documentary Media of Barcelona in October 2014, at the La Farinera del Clot cultural center and at the Tarragona City Council in 2015, and at the University of Lleida in 2016, among other places.

In addition, she also worked on the project Construccions identitàries Famílies, together with Andrea Basave and the support of the association of families of transsexual minors Chrysallis. In this initiative, Llop portrayed people of various ages during the transition process.

In the activist field, she was one of the founders and first president of the Catalan association of transsexual people Generem, of which she was president twice, in 2015–2018 and in 2021–2022. She was also a member of the cross-dressing association EnFemme. She actively participated in the Transforma la Salut platform, which has negotiated the new healthcare model for trans people of the Department of Health of the Generalitat of Catalonia. Her project Construcciones identitarias Work in progress was reflected in a book published in 2017.
