= Sankyo =

Sankyo (三共, Sankyō) means "third one" in Japanese. It may refer to:

- Daiichi Sankyo Co. (第一三共, Daiichi Sankyō), a Japanese pharmaceutical company and a successor of Sankyo Co., Ltd. (三共株式会社, Sankyō Kabushiki Kaisha), since 2005.
- SANKYO, Co., Ltd. (株式会社三共, Kabushiki Kaisha Sankyō), a Japanese manufacturer of pachinko machines
- Sankyo Flute Company, which produces silver, 5K, 10K, 14K, 18K, and 24K gold flutes
- Nidec Sankyo, a Japanese manufacturer of music boxes and electronic components, successor to Sankyo Seiki Mfg. Co. since 2005, part of the Nidec Group
- Sankyo Seiko Co., Ltd. (三共生興グループ)
