= Ethel Maude Wilson =

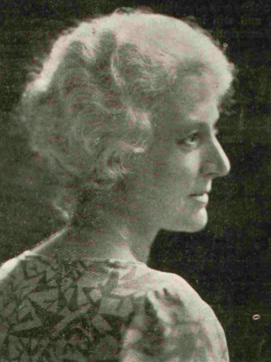
- in The Vote 22 October 1926
- Born: Ethel Maude Sanger; 23 November 1876; Stoke Newington
- Died: 12 October 1959 (aged 82); Boscombe
- Occupations: personal assistant, advertising manager and company director
- Spouse: Arthur James Wilson

Ethel Maude Wilson born Ethel Maude Sayer (23 November 1876 – 12 October 1959) was a British advertising manager and managing director of A. J. Wilson in 1926.

== Life ==
Wilson was born in Stoke Newington in 1876. She was one of at least eight children born to Emma Elizabeth Mahala (born Sandford) and William Sayer who was a builder and decorator.

In 1896 Arthur James Wilson had his own advertising agency creating signs and posters when Ethel (Sayer) joined him and his other five employees as a secretary. She had to put up with the family's shame of her going into business and the struggle to operate in difficult full length skirts. Ethel could type, but she taught herself sign language so that she could interpret her boss's ideas. Because of her role as hearing assistant she was able to gain access to meetings that were usually men only. And because of her business skills, she became the business's company secretary when the company went public in 1899.

In 1912 women in advertising were encouraged to meet at an advertising exhibition opened at the Royal Horticultural Hall organised by the magazine Advertising World. In the following year an organisation was formed with Wilson as president and Nina Oliver-Watts as secretary. During the war she helped drive soldiers to be entertained in the country. This was organised by the London Volunteer Rifles. She helped to organise transport for Belgian refugees and the Association of Advertising Women (AAW) continued through the first world war.

She joined the Women's Advertising Club of London and she was its second president in 1924.

In 1926 she was in the public eye when she became the managing director of A. J. Wilson which at that time had 200 staff. The company ceased to exist soon after 1928 when Arthur retired.

She and Arthur were living in Leamington when he died in 1945. She died in 1959 in Boscombe.
