= Women's advertising club =

Professional organization for marketers

A women's advertising club is an association for women who work in advertising. Such clubs were started in the US and UK in the early twentieth century after women had become established in the profession but were denied entry to male organisations. Some were originally founded by men as a way to entertain their wives during advertising conventions.

== History ==
=== UK ===
The Association of Advertising Women was established in London in 1910 or 1913. Ethel Sayer was the president. This ceased at the end of the World War I and was followed by the Women's Advertising Club of London in September 1923. The club was founded by three of the male members of the Thirty Club and it was intended to entertain women visitors, the following year, to the International Advertising Convention at Wembley. The first president was Marion Jean Lyon of Punch magazine. Three of the founding members were the sisters Florence Sangster and Margaret Sangster and their flatmate Kathleen Maclachlan. Both of the sisters were to be president and they became leading advertising executives before WW2.

==== Early Presidents ====
- Marion Jean Lyon in 1923
- Ethel Sayer in 1924
- Ethel Mary Wood in 1925
- Florence Sangster in 1926

=== America ===
The League of Advertising Women was started in New York in 1912 by Christine Frederick and still exists as the Advertising Women of New York. Other American clubs included the Women's Advertising Club of St. Louis (1916), the Women's Advertising Club of Chicago (1917) and the Women's Advertising Club of Toronto (1933). Other related organisations included the Women's Publicity Club of Boston which was founded in 1911 to campaign for truth in advertising.
