= Stuart Rose (designer) =

British designer (1911–1993)

Thomas Stuart Rose (London, 2 October 1911 – 10 September 1993, Coggeshall) CBE was the first Design Director to the British Post Office 1968-76. In 1974 he was awarded the Phillips Gold Medal for stamp design and was appointed CBE the same year.

== Early life ==
Rose was born in London to Scottish parents. He was educated at Magdalen College School, Oxford, and then at the LCC Central School of Arts and Crafts.

== Career ==
He first worked under Ashley Havinden at the leading advertising agency Crawfords and later under Sir Francis Meynell.

After World War II he was Editor of Design magazine and in the 1960s an associate of the Design Research Unit, President of the Society of Industrial Artists and Designers (1963), Governor of the Central School of Art and Design (1965–74) and member of the FBI Industrial Design Committee until 1965 (Chairman 1965-68).

He was a member of the Council of Industrial Design Stamp Advisory Committee (1960–62), and of the Post Office Stamp Advisory Panel (1968–76). He replaced Francis Meynell as Typographical Adviser to the Postmaster General in 1962 and became the first Design Director at the Post Office in 1968, which post he held until his retirement in 1976.

== Outside work ==
Rose was married to Dorothea (Dodo), and they had two daughters.

In the 1950s, Rose was instrumental in creating in Suffolk the first new civil parish since about 1880.

== Publications ==
- Royal Mail stamps: A survey of British stamp design. Oxford: Phaidon, 1980. ISBN 0714820725
