= Hans Schleger =

German-British graphic designer (1898–1976)

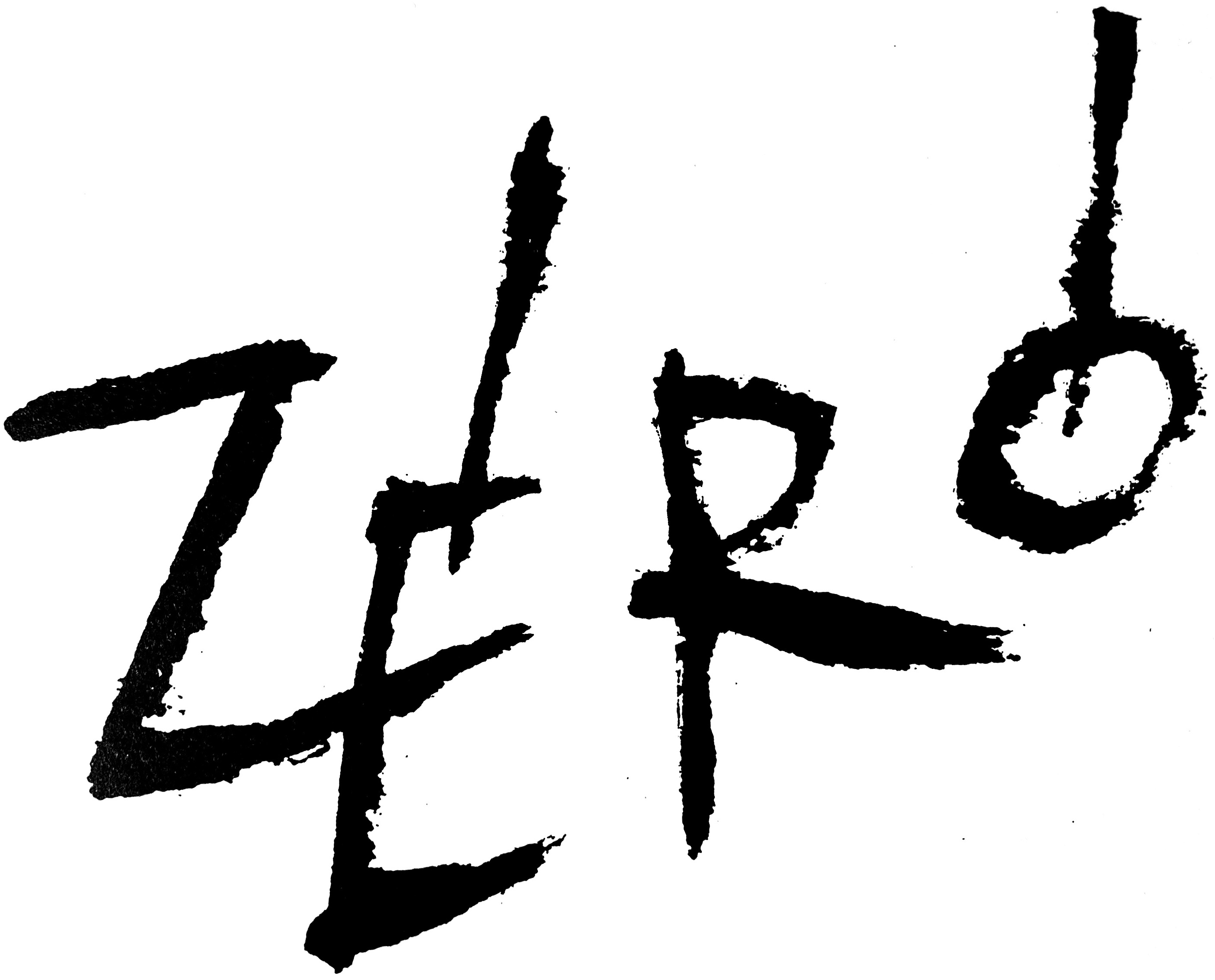
- Born: Hans Leo Degenhard Schlesinger; 29 December 1898; Kępno, Prussia (now Poland)
- Died: 18 September 1976 (aged 77); London, England
- Other name: Zéró
- Education: Berlin Kunstgewerbeschule (1918–1921)
- Occupation: Graphic designer

Hans Schleger (born Hans Leo Degenhard Schlesinger; 29 December 1898 – 18 September 1976) was a German-Polish-Jewish and later British graphic designer.

== Early life ==
He was born in Kempen in Posen, Prussia (in modern-day Poland) on 9 December 1898 to Jewish parents. His family relocated to Berlin when he was six. At the age of 20, he changed his surname to Schleger, and attended the Kunstgewerbeschule (from 1918 to 1921), studying under painter Emil Orlik. He began his career in Berlin, working for John Hagenbeck as a film set designer, and also designed the firm's logo. In 1924 he moved to New York City to work in the publishing and advertising industry, initially as a freelance designer, illustrator, and magazine layout artist, and later as an art director; he began using the pseudonym 'Zéró' in 1926, when he founded his own firm on Madison Avenue, and would continue to use the name for the rest of his career. After three years in New York he moved back to Germany to work for the Berlin branch of W.S. Crawford, an English advertising firm.

== Career in England ==
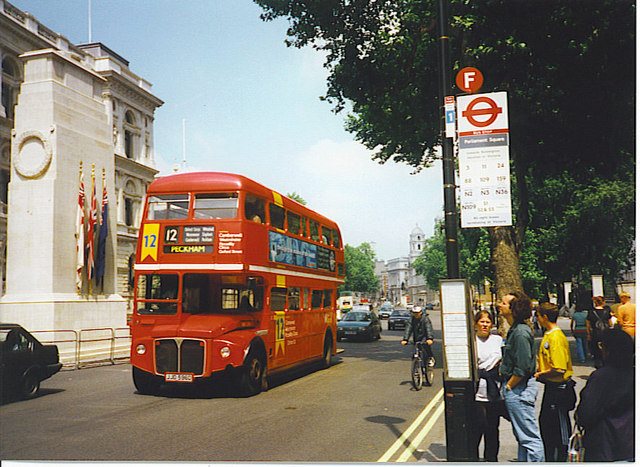
A bus stop in London in the late 1990s, with the "flag" sign design a direct descendent of Schleger's original design from 1935.

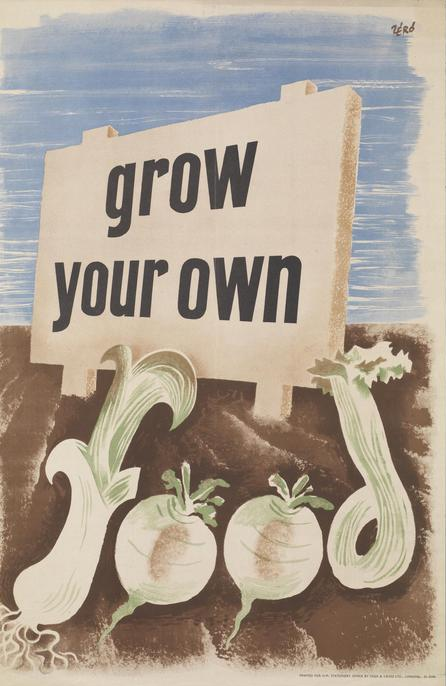
A poster designed by Schleger for the War Office as part of the Dig for Victory campaign. (1941)

In 1932, he moved to England, continuing to work for Crawford's. He became an integral part of London's early 1930s avant-garde design community, and helped spread the aesthetics and philosophy of modernism in Britain. Among his most well known work is the London Transport bus-stop sign, which was commissioned in 1935 by Frank Pick, and is still in use today, largely unchanged from the original. In 1939 he became a naturalized British citizen, and during World War II designed posters for the War Office and Ministry for Food, and for the London Passenger Transport Board, including posters for the Dig for Victory campaign. His work was included in the Britain Can Make It exhibition held at the Victoria & Albert Museum in London in 1946.

In the post-war period he worked with the agency Mather & Crowther, before founding his own firm, Hans Schleger & Associates, in 1953. He created corporate identities, posters, and campaigns for companies such as Penguin Press, John Lewis Partnership, ICI, British Coal, Shell-Mex & BP, Finmar Furniture, the British Sugar Corporation, and the Edinburgh Festival, and designed the triangular bottle for Glenfiddich and Grant's Scotch Whisky. In the 1950s and 60s he became specifically associated with British companies and organizations, and for developing a particularly British aesthetic.

He married Patricia Maycock (later known as Pat Schleger), also a graphic designer, in 1956, forming a husband and wife creative partnership.

He taught and guest lectured at Chelsea Polytechnic, Saint Martins School of Art, the Royal College of Art, and the Regional College of Art in Manchester. In 1950, he spent a year in Chicago as a visiting professor at the Institute of Design, which had been founded by László Moholy-Nagy as the "New Bauhaus" together with artists and designers from the Bauhaus who had left Germany at a similar time to Schleger.

In 1959, Schleger was named a Royal Designer for Industry. He died in London in September 1976.

Paul Rand called Schleger "a graphic designer before the concept of graphic design was invented".
