= Reginald M. Phillips =

English businessman, philanthropist (1888–1977)

- Born: 1888
- Died: 1977 (aged 88–89)
- Occupations: Philanthropist; philatelist

Reginald Moses Phillips, CBE, Hon LL.D. (1888–1977) was an English businessman, philanthropist and philatelist. In 1966, after negotiations with Tony Benn, the Postmaster General, he donated his comprehensive 46 volume collection of British Victorian stamps to the nation, together with £50,000 for its upkeep, where it formed the centrepiece of what was then (1966–1998) the National Postal Museum and is now The British Postal Museum & Archive.

Having achieved success as a businessman Philips returned to his childhood hobby of stamp collecting in his fifties. He then set about assembling the most complete collection of Victorian stamps and meticulously cataloguing it. After donating his British Queen Victoria collection to the nation, he collected other areas such as King George V Seahorses. During his life he also made donations to help with the education of deaf children.

Phillips also instituted the Phillips Gold Medal for postage stamp design which has been awarded since 1969.
