= Simpsons of Piccadilly =

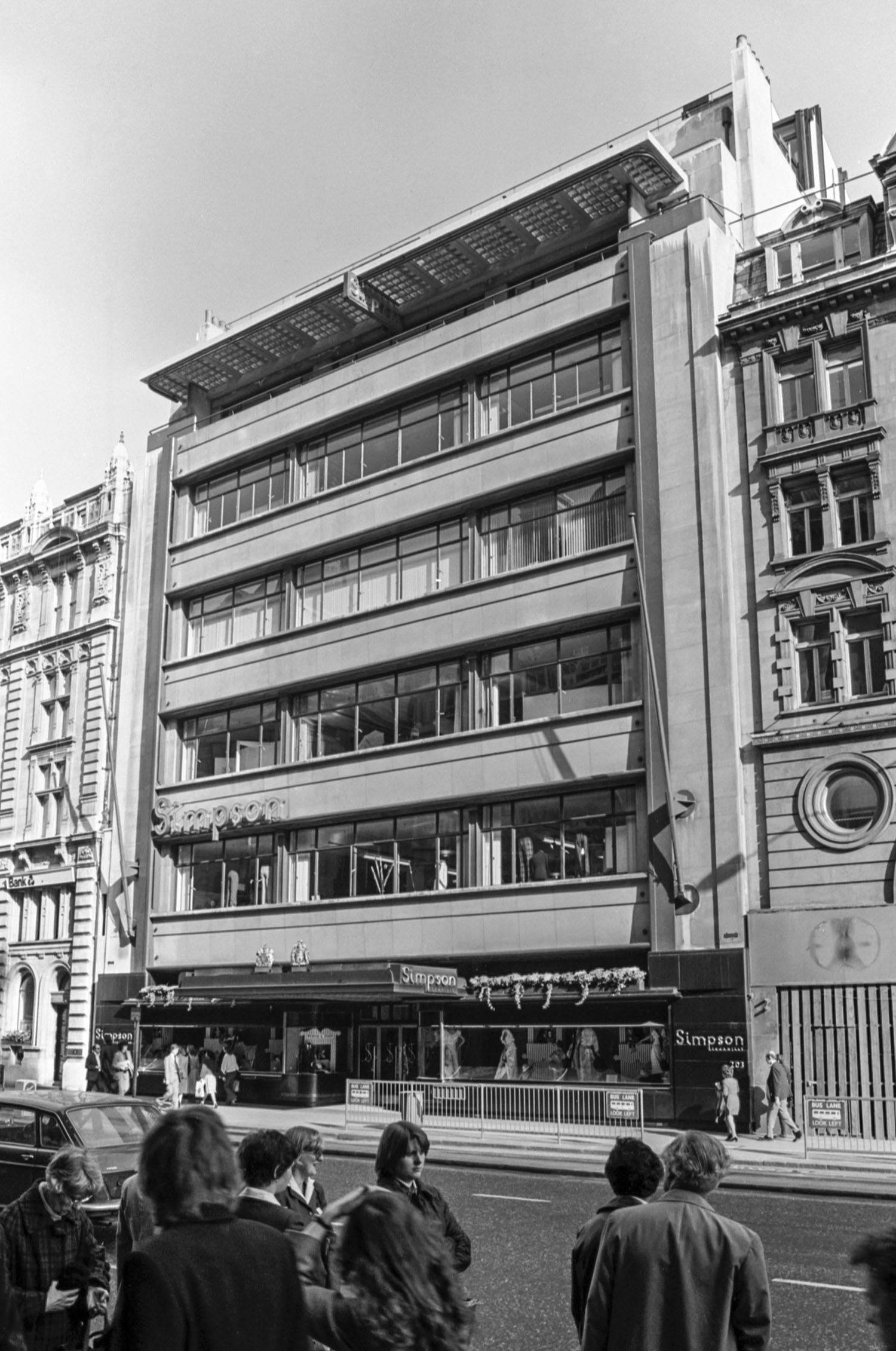
- Simpsons of Piccadilly in the 1970s

- Location within England

General information
- Type: Retail Space
- Location: Piccadilly; London, United Kingdom
- Coordinates: 51.5092°N 0.1361°W
- Construction started: April 1935
- Completed: April 1936

Design and construction
- Architect: Joseph Emberton
- Main contractor: Alexander Simpson

Simpsons of Piccadilly was a large retail store situated at 203–206 Piccadilly in central London, England. It was created by Alexander Simpson and the architect Joseph Emberton. When it opened in April 1936, it was the largest menswear store in Britain, and has become a Grade II* listed building due to its innovative construction. Its original purpose was to house the entire range of clothing provided by the tailoring company S. Simpsons and DAKS. It was later purchased by the Waterstones chain of bookshops.

== History ==
After the launch of the successful DAKS trousers in 1934, Alexander Simpson wanted a store in which to stock the entire S Simpson range in central London. Wanting a location near Savile Row so that the foreign visitors to that street could go to examine Simpson clothes nearby for its high quality ready-to-wear tailoring, in 1935 the site of the old Geological Museum in Piccadilly was to be sold on a 99-year building lease, which Simpson won at auction for £11,000. The site had a 71-foot (21.64 m) frontage on both Piccadilly and on Jermyn Street (rear entrance) with a footprint of about 11,000 sq ft (1,022 m^{2}) and an easy walking distance from Savile Row.

Simpson aimed to build a large, modern menswear store to serve as a flagship for the S Simpson brand, with a steel structure, faced in Portland stone and to be built as high as permitted, and to compete with the store built for the rival Austin Reed ten years prior. Simpson contracted Joseph Emberton as the architect for this project, known for his modernity in architecture and for designing the interior of the Austin Reed store.

The building's main elements were large bands of Portland stone alternating with strips of windows spanning the whole building width, a glass wall that stretched the height of the building at 90 feet (27.43 m) that lit each open-plan floor with natural light (from a side lightwell due to the densely built-up area), against which the enormous Travertine marble staircase spiralled up the centre of the building, and the distinctive non-reflecting concave windows along the street level at front and back – the first in the country at the time. The design is distinctly modern in comparison to the regular architectural style of the time. Simpson wanted the building elements to visually show their function rather than be disguised by unnecessary decoration. It is considered innovative in its use of materials with large windows, chromium-plated fittings and a steel structure devised by Felix Samuely. The London County Council first had the steel framing removed before agreeing to allow its use. It cost such a price that Alexander Simpson warned that the company was not expecting to earn a profit for several years after due to his determination to create something of such high quality (for which it later won awards).

László Moholy-Nagy, a director of the Bauhaus school, designed much of the visual merchandising and displays for the shop, including the in-store signage, the window displays, and three aircraft to be exhibited on the fifth floor at the store opening merely to draw in curious customers, attract headlines and increase footfall (the door framing had to be removed to allow the aeroplanes into the building and suspected to have been winched up the centre of the staircase). Ashley Havinden, influenced by cubism, futurism and Bauhaus typography, designed the store's logos, advertising, and some rugs and carpeting. The store housed many other services such as a gift shop, a dog shop, a barber's shop, and a restaurant (the wine vault can still be found in the basement), along with the departments for Simpson clothing – bespoke tailoring (Simpson wanted customers to be able to see the tailors in action), ready-to-wear DAKS suits, and a sports shop. Shop fittings and lighting were designed by Emberton which are still in place such as the stairwell's 90-foot chromium light fitting suspended from the ceiling, and the steel and glass handrails. On the fifth floor was a balcony that allowed views across London at Westminster Abbey and St Paul's Cathedral.

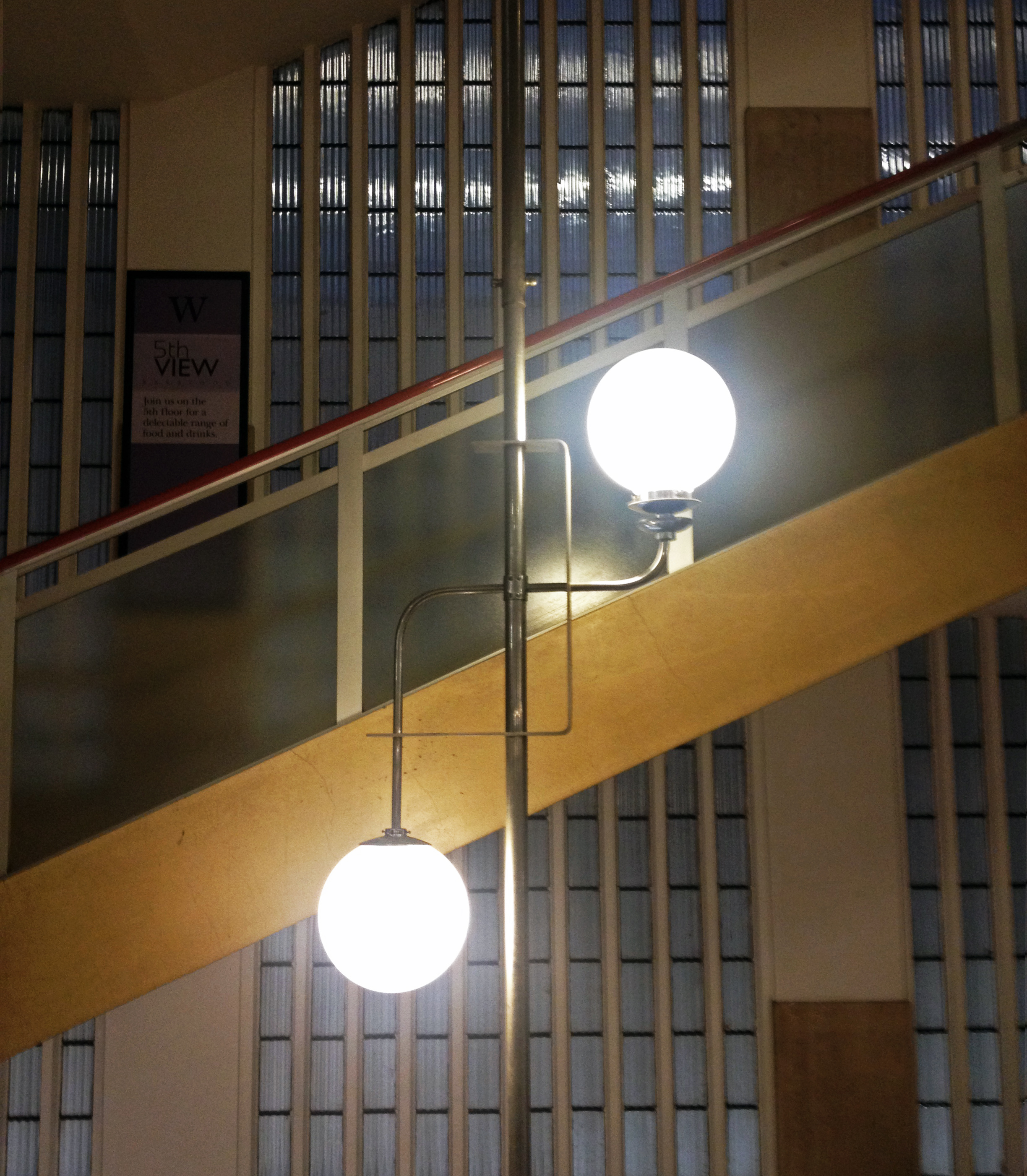
Simpsons of Piccadilly light fitting

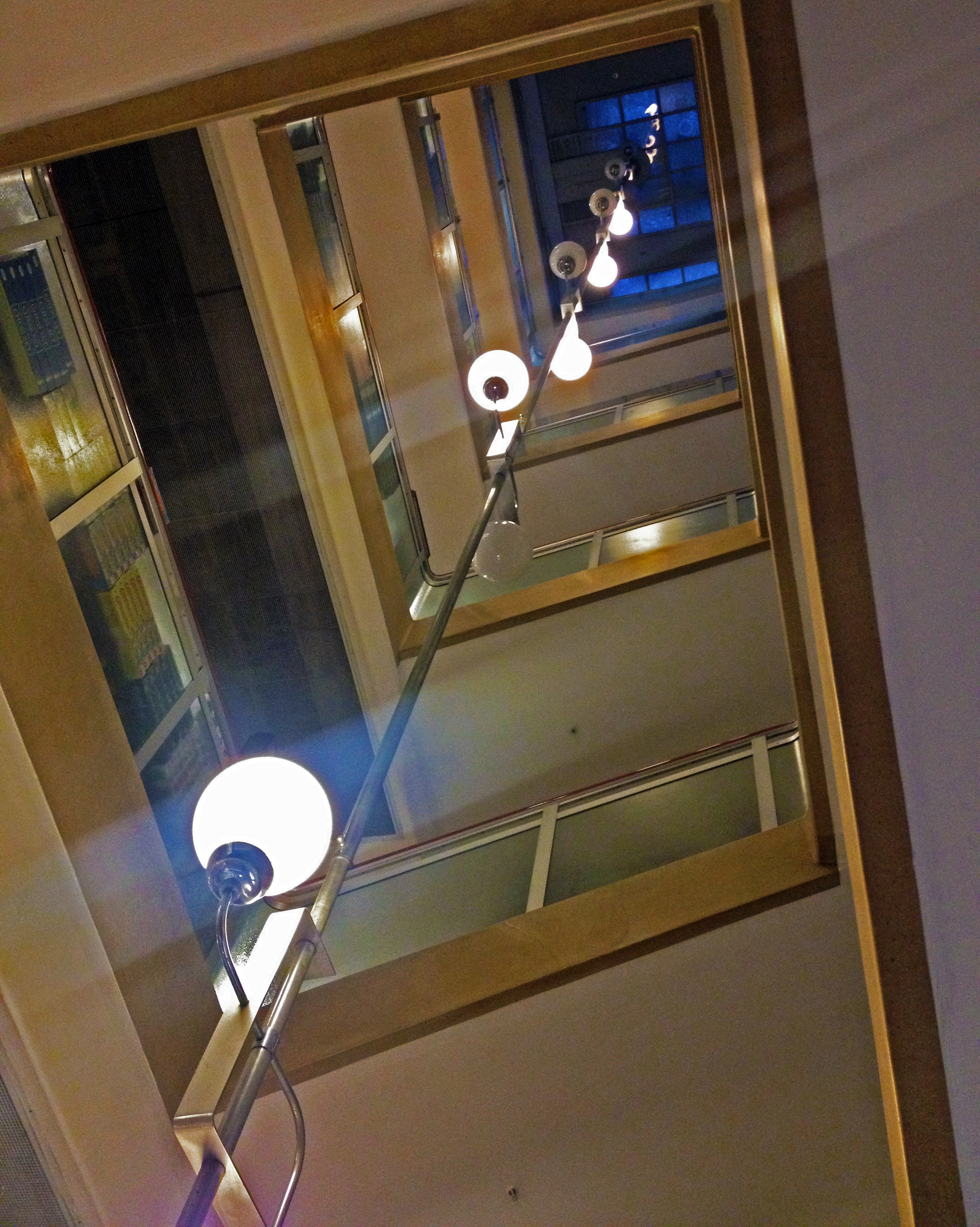
Simpsons of Piccadilly light fitting

The building is recognised as Joseph Emberton's masterpiece – the front glass and stone strips are not quite horizontal as perceived on first glance, but at a slight angle to help appear more horizontal, keep clean for longer and reflect the coloured neon lighting that was in place at the opening; ducts are hidden around the walls so that the lights in them reflect better off the ceiling, the water supply was by an artesian well in the basement; the vast open floors which were uncommon at the time, fitted with hidden sliding fire doors; a vacuum cleaning system with vertical tubes installed through the building and in the ceiling ducts; the use of new coloured neon-lighting for the front of the shop that he'd used at the Blackpool Pleasure Beach before; and having the first curved-glass windows in Britain.

A year after the shop's opening in 1936, Alexander Simpson died at the age of 34 from leukaemia in May 1937.

The shop's performance was successful, renowned for the window displays and was considered a sight for London, and as planned by Simpson, the fourth floor was designated for womenswear a year after opening.

During the Second World War, Simpson Piccadilly was one of the largest stores to stock wartime uniform for soldiers, providing for both men and women officers and civilians. Simpson was commissioned by the Government to make a wide selection of clothing and in total, it was worked out that seven million items of clothing were produced. Dr Simpson (the company successor and elder brother of Alexander Simpson) opened the members club on the top floor of the store for soldiers where they were able to find a place to sleep, bathe and telephone loved ones. After the war, when it was announced that DAKS clothes would start selling again, queues of people would line up down Piccadilly, tailors would measure them in line, and suitable pairs of trousers were then presented to them in the store.

In the early 1950s, scriptwriter Jeremy Lloyd was employed as a junior assistant at Simpson; he drew on his experiences to come up with the idea for the popular 1972–1985 television sitcom Are You Being Served?

Throughout the last few decades of the 20th century, the store branched out on the variety of stock and sold other brands such as Armani, Mary Quant, and Christian Dior.

== Present day ==
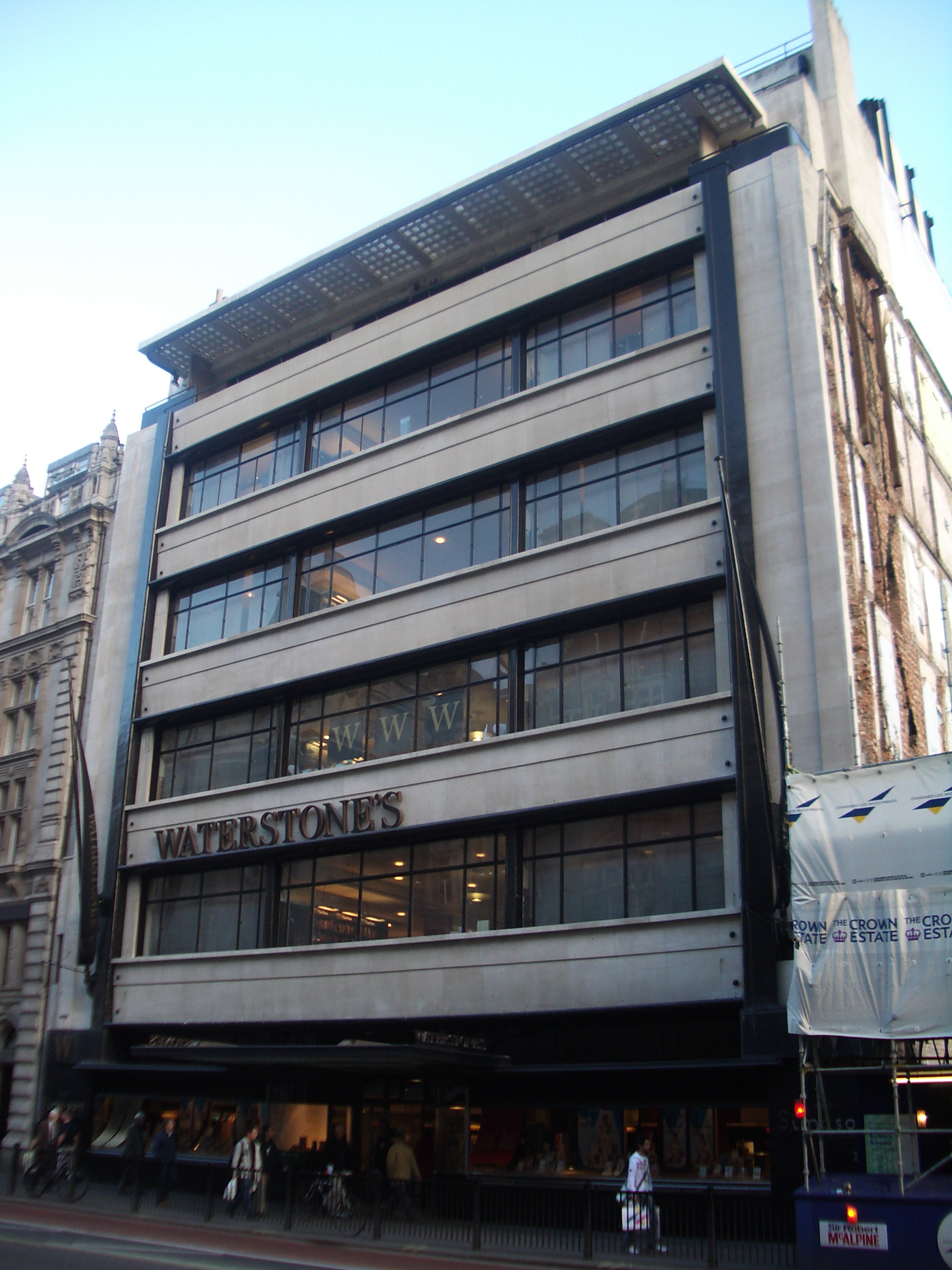
The building in 2005, the flagship store for Waterstones booksellers

Simpson continued to trade in the Piccadilly store until the 1990s, after DAKS Simpson Group plc was acquired by the Japanese group Sankyo Seiko Co. Limited in 1991. The building sold to the Waterstones chain of bookshops in 1999 and serves as their flagship store. On the 5th floor is a bar, 5th View Bar & Food, with a southerly view over the rooftops towards the Houses of Parliament.

Although Simpson is no longer trading as it was, the DAKS Simpson brand of menswear and womenswear continues rebranded under the DAKS name and is sold in DAKS stores, amongst other outlets with the flagship store on Old Bond Street. DAKS holds royal warrants granted by three members of the Royal Family. The royal warrant by Queen Elizabeth II was given in 1962, that from the then Duke of Edinburgh in 1956 and from the then Prince of Wales in 1982.

== Bibliography ==
- Wainwright, David; The British Tradition: Simpson – a World of Style, Quiller Press Ltd, 1996. ISBN 1-899163-158.
- Butler, Marianne; London Architecture, Metro Publications, 2004. ISBN 1-902910-18-4.
- Powers, Alan; Modern. The Modern Movement in Britain, Merrell, 2005.
