= Ashley Script =

- Category: Script
- Designer(s): Ashley Havinden
- Foundry: Monotype

Ashley Script is a typeface developed by the British designer Ashley Havinden in 1955 for Monotype Corporation. He also created the fonts Ashley Crawford and Ashley Inline.

Ashley Script is a brush script and is based on Havinden's own handwriting.
