= Phillips Gold Medal =

- Description: Award for outstanding contribution to British postage stamp design
- Country: United Kingdom
- Presented by: British Philatelic Trust / The Postal Museum

The Phillips Gold Medal is awarded to the person who, in the opinion of the judges, has contributed the most to British postage stamp design in recent years. The award was established by the distinguished British philatelist Reginald M. Phillips. The medal is three inches wide and made of 22 carat gold. It is retained by the winner.

Originally awarded every five years, the medal now appears to be awarded on an irregular basis.

== Winners ==
- 1969 David Gentleman.
- 1974 Stuart Rose.
- 1979 David Gentleman.
- 1984 Adrian George, artist.
- 1989 Barry Robinson of Royal Mail.
- 1995 Howard Brown, graphic designer.
- 2004 Jeffery Matthews.
