= Leonard Raven-Hill =

English painter (1867–1942)

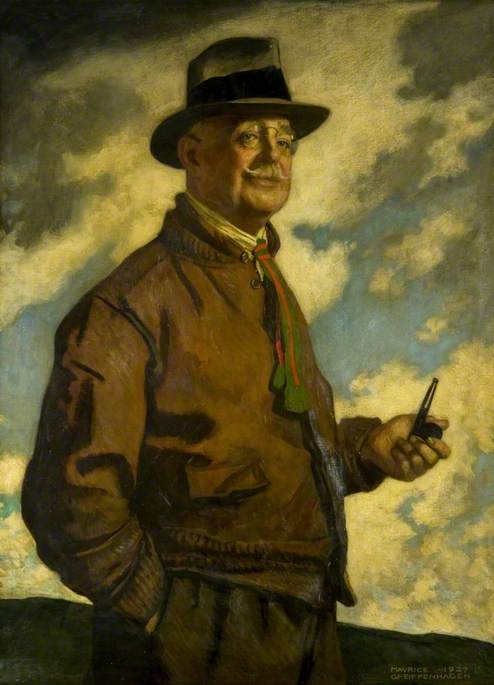
- Leonard Raven-Hill by Maurice Greiffenhagen.
- Born: 10 March 1867 Bath, Somerset, England
- Died: 31 March 1942 (aged 75) Ryde, Isle of Wight, England
- Area: Political cartoon

Leonard Raven-Hill (10 March 1867 – 31 March 1942) was an English artist, illustrator and cartoonist.

== Life ==
He was born in Bath and educated at Bristol Grammar School and the Devon County School. He studied art at the Lambeth School of Art and then in Paris under William-Adolphe Bouguereau and Aimé Morot. He began to exhibit at the Salon in 1887 but moved back to London when he was appointed as the art editor of Pick-Me-Up. He also continued to work as a painter and exhibited at the Royal Academy in 1889. In 1893 he founded, with Arnold Golsworthy, the humorous and artistic monthly The Butterfly (1893–94, revived in 1899–1900) but began his most prominent association with a publication when his drawings appeared in Punch in December 1895. By 1901 he had joined the staff of Punch as the junior political cartoonist under Bernard Partridge.

Unlike most of the cartoonists at Punch, he was fairly sympathetic to liberal causes such as women's suffrage, Old Age Pensions Act 1908 and National Insurance Act 1911.

He contributed to many other illustrated magazines including The Daily Graphic, Daily Chronicle, The Strand Magazine, The Sketch, Pall Mall Gazette and Windsor Magazine. He also illustrated a number of books including

- East London by Sir Walter Besant (1901)
- Cornish Saints and Sinners by J. H. Harris
- Three Men on the Bummel by Jerome K. Jerome
- Stalky & Co. by Rudyard Kipling
- Kipps by H. G. Wells

Raven-Hill published the impressions of his visit to India on the occasion of the tour of the Prince and Princess of Wales as An Indian Sketch-Book (1903) and his other published sketch-books include Our Battalion (1902) and The Promenaders (1894).

He was married twice, to Annie Rogers and Marion Jean Lyon; both predeceased him. His first marriage resulted in four children, two daughters and two sons.

In his later years his eyesight began to fail. Raven-Hill died on 31 March 1942 at Ryde on the Isle of Wight, and was buried with his first wife at the churchyard of St Helen's Church, St Helens, Isle of Wight.

His obituary in the New York Times describes him as the "last great Victorian artist", and states he was known for "his sense of character and humor and sound draftsmanship".

== Gallery ==
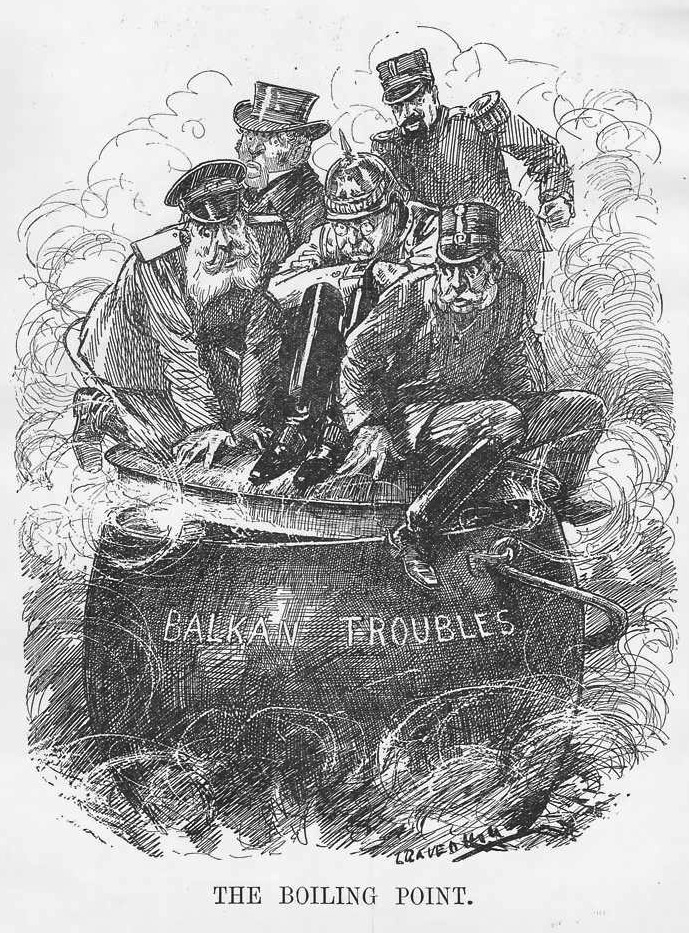
A Punch cartoon of October 2, 1912 depicting Britain, France, German Empire, Austria-Hungary, and Russian Empire sitting on a lid on top of a pot marked "Balkan Troubles", satirizing the situation in the Balkans leading up to the First Balkan War

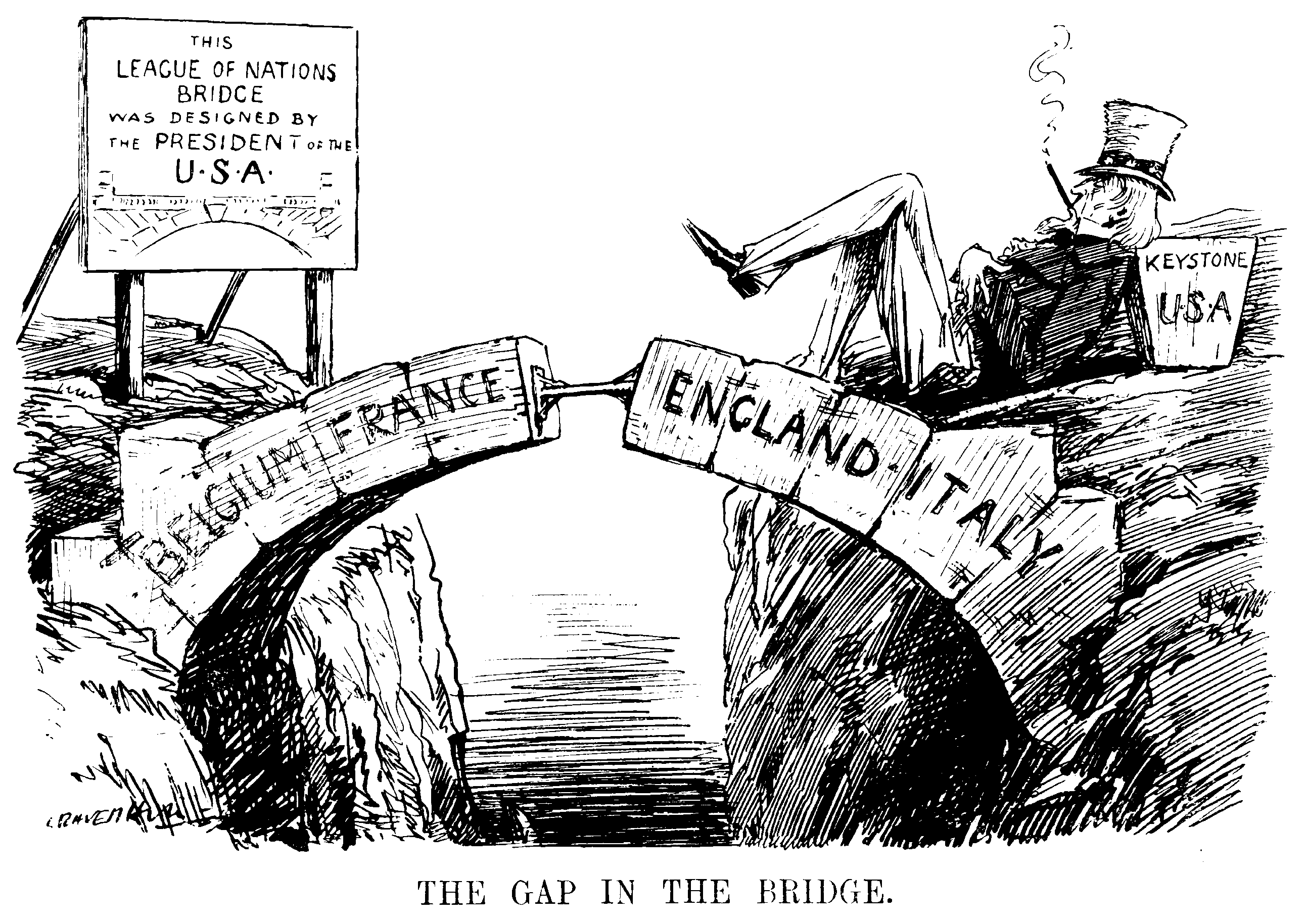
The Gap in the Bridge: Cartoon about the absence of the USA from the League of Nations, depicted as the missing keystone of the arch. The cigar also symbolizes America (Uncle Sam) enjoying its wealth.
