= Margaret Havinden =

British advertising executive (1895–1974)

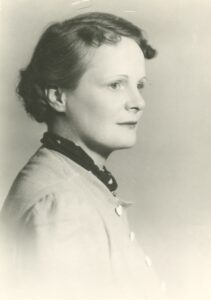
- Havinden in 1936
- Born: Margaret Kirk Sangster; 26 January 1895; Bridge of Weir
- Died: 22 September 1974 (aged 79); St Albans
- Employer: W.S.Crawford
- Known for: Advertising executive
- Spouse(s): Blair, Ashley Havinden
- Relatives: Florence Sangster (sister)

Margaret Kirk Havinden (born Sangster; became Blair; 26 January 1895 – 22 September 1974) was an advertising executive born in Scotland. She was a director of W.S.Crawford and President of the Women's Advertising Club of London from 1935 to 1936.

== Life ==
Margaret Sangster was born in south western Scotland at the village of Bridge of Weir in 1895. Her father's business collapsed, and that event ended her plans to go to university. She went to work in a museum until World War I ended. She then joined two of her sisters in London working for the advertising agency WS Crawford, where Emily Sangster left to marry in 1919. Florence Sangster became a manager but Margaret was in time made an account executive, which she considered an ideal position between the customer and the creatives. Nineteen-year-old Ashley Havinden joined WS Crawford in 1922 as a creative — he worked for Margaret Sangster. She married in the following year John Milligan Blair, son of Sir Robert Blair (1859–1935) of the London County Council.

The Women's Advertising Club of London was formed in 1923. Three of the founding members were the sisters Florence and Margaret Sangster and their flat mate Kathleen Maclachlan and Marion Jean Lyon became the president. Both of the sisters were to be president of the club. Florence was first and Margaret served from 1936 to 1937.

In 1927 Margaret Blair started divorce proceedings and she married Havinden in the following year. In 1929 they both became directors of Crawfords. They had two children and they employed a nanny and a housekeeper to enable them both to work. Margaret worked long hours and it is said that she ran Crawfords during the war. In 1941 they regretfully decided to send their children to America as the threat of invasion seemed credible, but short. In time, they arranged to have their children returned to them by routing their journey through Portugal.

Margaret followed her sister's lead in encouraging the careers of girls by writing. In 1951 she contributed to, Careers and Vocational Training: A Guide to the Professions and Occupations of Educated Women and Girls.

Havinden died in St Albans in 1974.
