= Crawford's Advertising Agency =

British advertising agency

Crawford's Advertising Agency, formally WS Crawford Ltd, was one of the most important British advertising agencies of the first half of the 20th century. It was responsible for introducing a highly visual style more influenced by European artistic movements such as modernism and futurism than by traditional American marketing techniques. The agency owed its success largely to its founder Sir William S. Crawford, Florence Sangster, the art director Ashley Havinden and Margaret Sangster.

They exerted an enormous influence on British advertising from the early 1920s until the end of the 1950s.

== History ==
W. S. Crawford Ltd was established in High Holborn, London, in 1914. During the 1920s it moved to larger premises and remained there until 1972 when it relocated to Westbourne Terrace. These premises were shared with Dorland Advertising as a result of their financial merger in 1967. Saatchi & Saatchi acquired the combined company in 1981.

W. S. (later Sir William) Crawford built a large part of his reputation on his contributions to official and government publicity campaigns and he was Chairman of the "Buy British Campaign" of the 1930s. The businesses success between the wars is attributed to Margaret and Florence Sangster. Margaret led a creative team and Florence rose to be a vice-chair and joint managing director.

W. S. Crawford was succeeded as chairman of the agency in 1950 by Sir Hubert Oughton, a director since 1929, who continued until 1968. He was also President of the IIPA (Institute of Incorporated Practitioners in Advertising), the forerunner of the Institute of Practitioners in Advertising and AA and an important figure in NABS. In 1968 Sir Hubert Oughton was succeeded as chairman by Malcolm Ashworth who is credited as saving the agency from financial collapse.

Ashley Havinden (1903–1973) joined Crawford as a trainee in 1922 working for account executive Margaret Sangster (later his wife). He was promoted to art director in 1929, a post he held until 1967. Ashley's modernist typography and style influenced by cubism, futurism and The Bauhaus was part of the agency's success and progressive reputation during the 1920s and 1930s. Among these were Chrysler motors, the GPO, Simpson's department store, and Eno's fruit salts. Ashley was the creative resource working for account Margaret Sangster and copywriter G.H. Saxon-Mills.

Stefan Schwarzkopf has claimed that Sir William Crawford's advertising agency in London became a pioneer in promoting the social, cultural and economic role of this new group of agency workers, and that it became the first advertising agency that carved out a unique position within a highly competitive market by defining its visual production and organisational identity entirely through notions of creativity. Schwarzkopf argues that this places Crawford's, "at the heart of the emergence of a cultural economy for which creative skills are a paramount source of value creation".

== Chairmen ==
- Sir William S. Crawford (1914–1950)
- Sir Hubert Oughton (1950–1968)
- Malcolm S W Ashworth (1968–70)

== Managing directors ==
- Malcolm S W Ashworth (1964–1967)
- Florence Sangster (1940s)

== Art directors ==
- Ashley Havinden (from 1920s)

== Creatives ==
- Stuart Rose
- Derek Birdsall, typographer, (1950s)
- Rodney Thomas (1920s)
- Nigel Snell, visualiser (1950s)
- Desmond Skirrow (1950s)
- Elizabeth Smart, copywriter (1950s)
- Hans Schleger (1930s)
- Edward McKnight Kauffer (1927–1934)
- Godfrey Hope Saxon Mills, copywriter (1920s–40s)
- Bob Chudley, founder of Letraset (1950s)
- Graham Oakley (1960–62)
- Philip Thompson (1950s–60s)
- Michael Whittlesea RWS (1950s)
- Nicolas Bentley (from 1920s)
- Ronald Alan Wilkinson (1960's)
- Robin (Buz) Busbridge (Visualiser from 1958 to 1964) Worked on The Scotsman, Vauxhall, British Aluminium, Shell Chemicals, Robinson Cleaver, Army and Navy and many more under Studio Head Tony Marshall.
