= Church Gate, Fulham =

Street in Fulham, London

Coordinates: 51.469310°N 0.210936°W

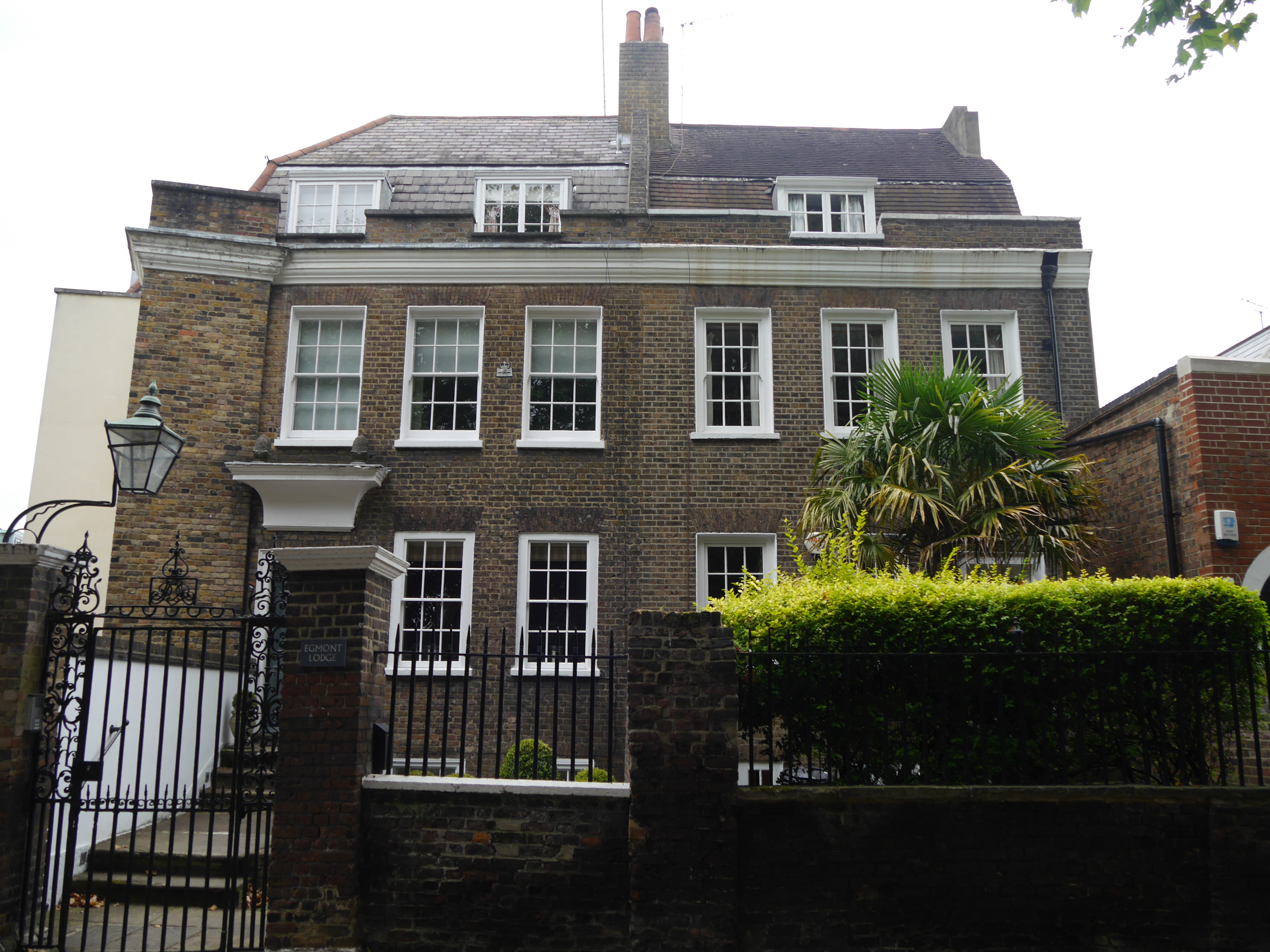
5 and 6 Church Gate, Fulham

Church Gate, Fulham is a street in Fulham, London.

It runs west to east, from the junction with Fulham High Street and New King's Road to the main entrance gates for the grounds of All Saints Church, Fulham.

Numbers 5 and 6 are early 18th-century Grade II listed buildings.

Sir William Powell's Almshouses are 12 Grade II* listed almshouses.
