= Sankyo Seiko Co., Ltd. =

Japanese company

Sankyo Seiko Co., Ltd. (三共生興株式会社) is a Japanese company which wholesales apparel, textiles, suit materials, silk clothing, and accessories. The company also has real estate interests. Since 1991, it has owned the British luxury fashion house DAKS. Akira Inoue is its President.
