= Florence Sangster =

- Born: 9 February 1890; Glasgow
- Died: 1 March 1979 (aged 89); Plumpton Green
- Occupation: Advertising executive
- Employer: W.S.Crawford
- Known for: Director of Advertising company
- Spouse: Robert Alan Wimberley Bicknell

Florence Sangster became Florence Bicknell (9 February 1890 – 1 March 1979) was a United Kingdom advertising executive. She was a founding member and later president of the Women's Advertising Club of London and she was vice-chair of the advertising agency W.S.Crawford

== Life ==
Sangster was born in the area of Glasgow known as Kelvin in 1890. Her father's business collapsed and that ended her and her sister's plans to go to university. Their sister Emily was in London working for the advertising agency W.S.Crawford and Florence joined her. Emily Sangster left to marry in 1919 and by that time another sister Margaret Sangster was also employed at Crawfords. Florence became a manager and she was promoted to a director in 1921. Margaret was an account executive working closely with the designer Ashley Havinden who joined Crawfords in 1922. Margaret, in time, divorced to marry him.

The Women's Advertising Club of London was formed in 1923. Three of the founding members were the sisters Florence and Margaret Sangster and their flat mate Kathleen Maclachlan. Both of the sisters were to be president of the club. Florence was first in 1926 and Margaret served from 1936 to 1937.

Florence wrote for the book "The Road to Success: Twenty Essays on the Choice of a Career for Women" in 1936. The writer Antonia White worked for W.S.Crawfords where she took exception to Florence Sangster who was one of the directors. She wrote a short story, Julian Tye, featuring her as a barely concealed autocratic character.

Her sister Margaret worked long hours and it is said that she ran Crawfords during the war. Florence was a vice-chair when she retired in 1955 and she married Robert Alan Wimberley Bicknell. Florence died at her home in Plumpton Green in 1979.
