= Sir William Powell's Almshouses =

Coordinates: 51.4692°N 0.2116°W

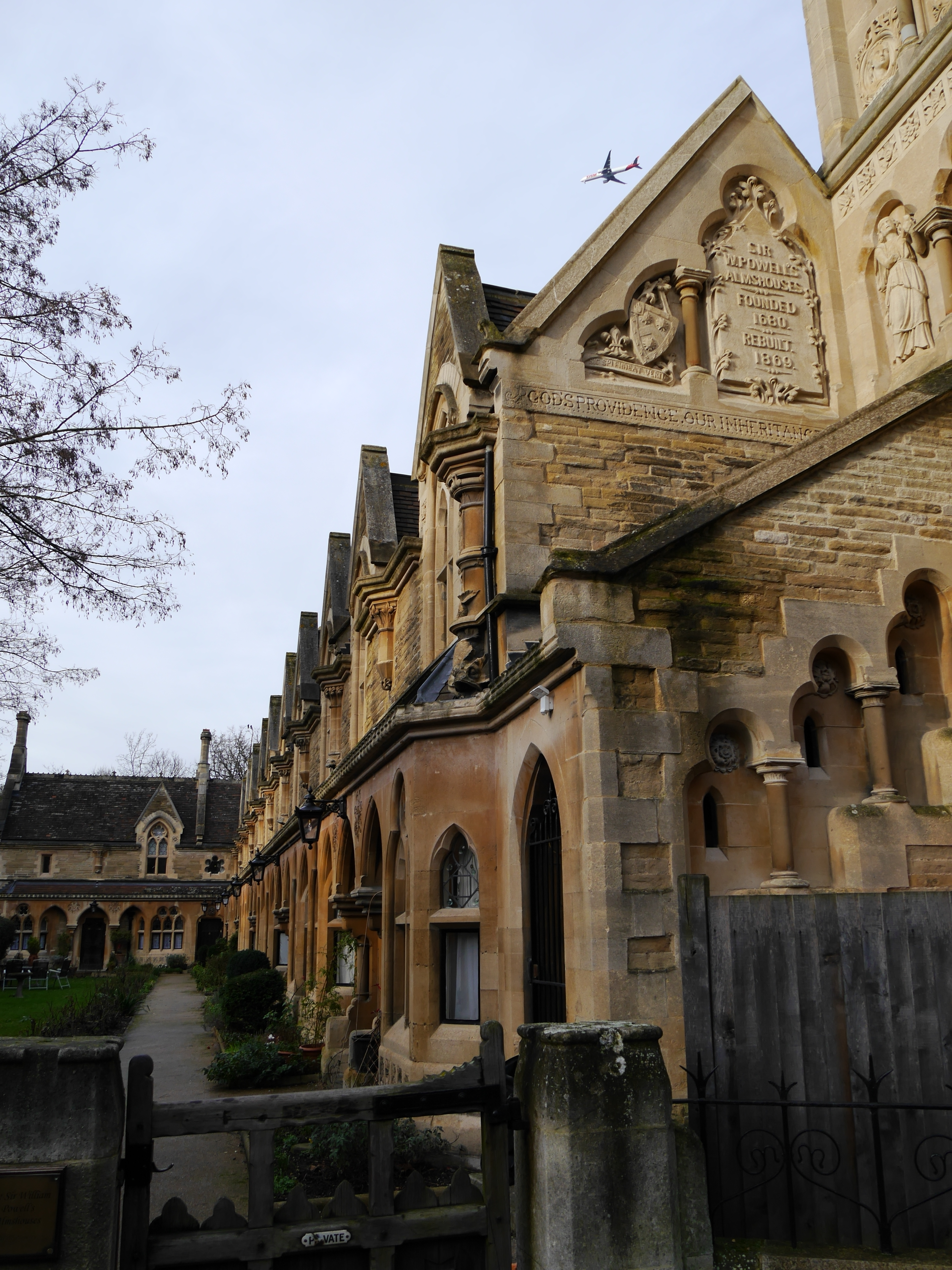
Sir William Powell's Almshouses

Sir William Powell's Almshouses are 12 Grade II* listed almshouses at Church Gate, Fulham, London.

The 12 one bedroom flats, built in 1869 (156 years ago), provide accommodation for older women. They are managed by the Sir Oswald Stoll Foundation.

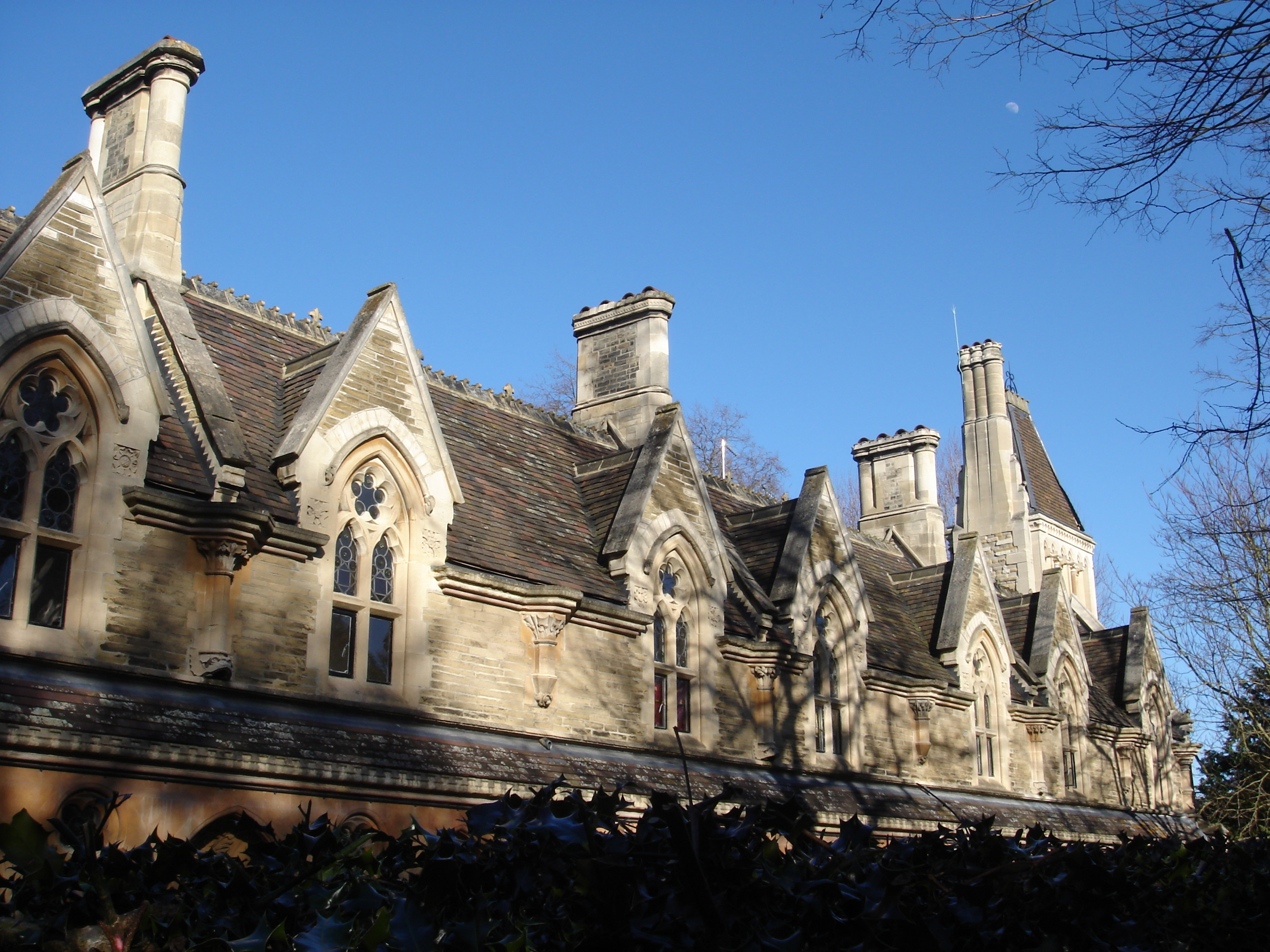
Sir William Powell's Almshouses

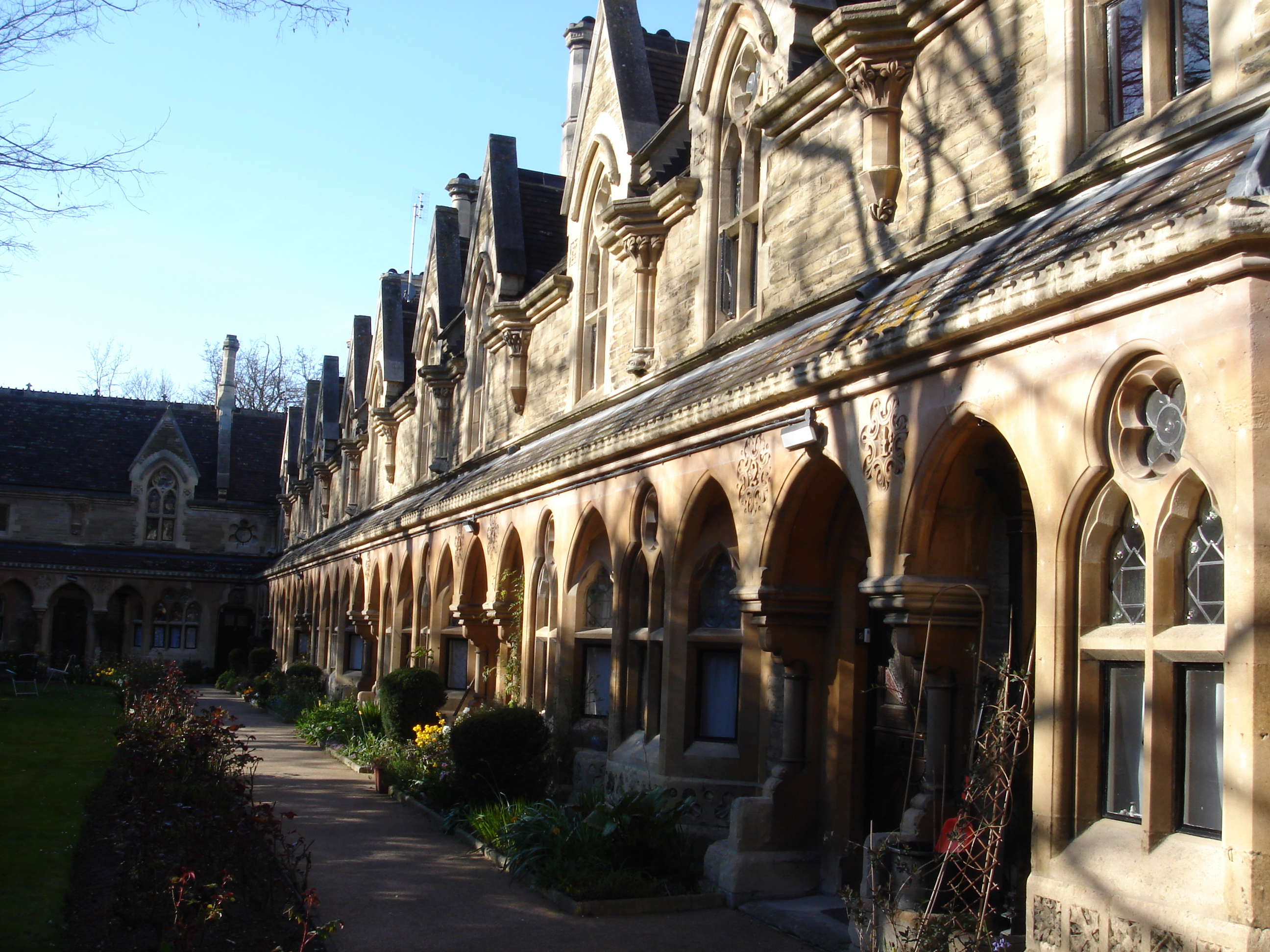
Sir William Powell's Almshouses
