= Joseph Emberton =

English architect

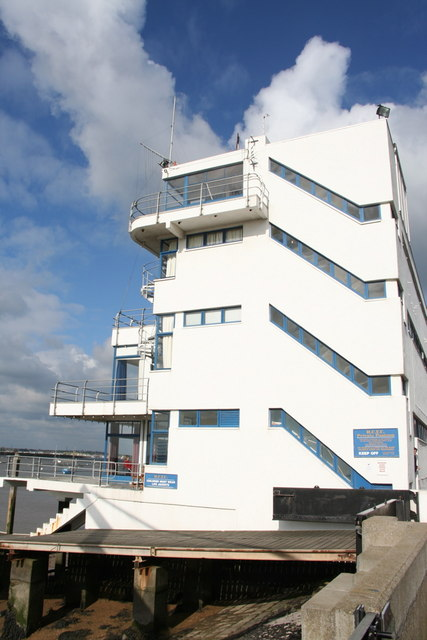
The Royal Corinthian Yacht Club

Joseph Emberton (23 December 1889 – 20 November 1956) was an English architect of the early modernist period. He was born 23 December 1889 in Audley, Staffordshire and was educated at the Royal College of Art. He first worked for the London architects Trehearne and Norman between 1913 and 1914, before serving as a gunner in the Honourable Artillery Company during the First World War.

In 1923 he designed Olympia National, then known as the New Hall. This sat alongside Olympia Grand at the Kensington event venue. 1932 saw the construction of his second addition to Olympia – Olympia Central (initially named the Empire Hall). These halls, along with other event spaces, all make up one of London's largest event venues – Olympia London.

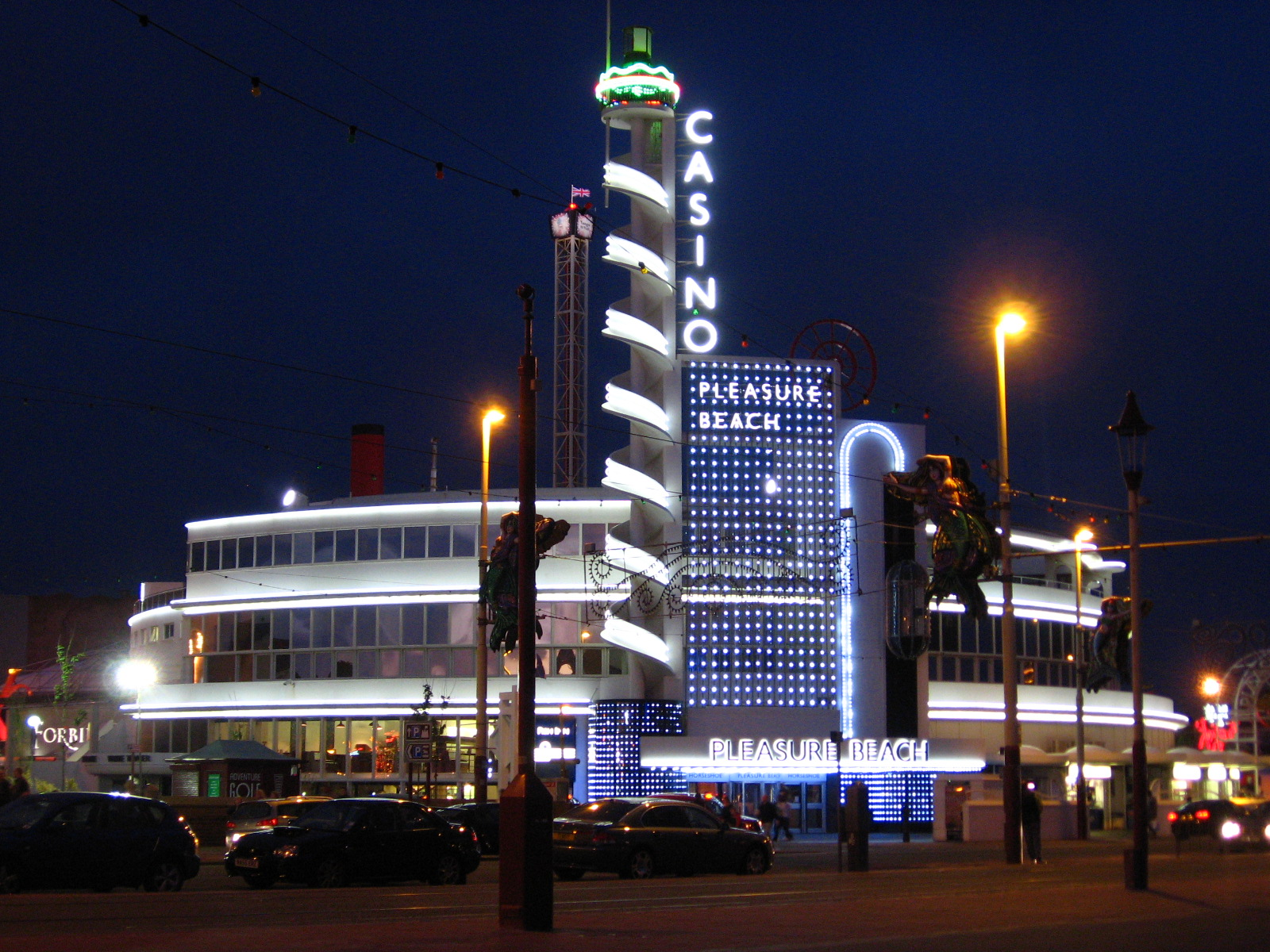
The Casino Building at Blackpool Pleasure Beach, designed by Emberton in 1939

His 1931 design of the Royal Corinthian Yacht Club at Burnham-on-Crouch represented Britain at the influential International Exhibition of Modern Architecture held at Museum of Modern Art in New York City in 1932. He went on to design the Simpsons of Piccadilly department store in 1936 with the interior designed by László Moholy-Nagy, the facade and foyer for Green's Playhouse in Dundee in 1936, and the Casino Building at Blackpool Pleasure Beach in 1939. Emberton was responsible for the design of the HMV store at 393 Oxford Street, London. He had to do it twice as the original 1936 burnt down and was replaced in 1939 by another of his design.

In 1952 Joseph Emberton was appointed architect of the Brunswick Close Estate, in an area of Finsbury, London that had suffered extensive damage during WWII. He died before the project was completed. Carl Ludwig Philipp Franck, as principal of the firm Emberton, Franck & Tardew, took charge and saw it to completion in 1958.

Emberton's archive is located at the University of Brighton Design Archives.

Emberton married Kathleen Marie (née Chantrey; born 1906/7), who was the daughter of the chartered accountant, William Herbert Chantrey. The couple had two daughters.

He died in London on 20 November 1956.
