= Arthur James Wilson =

Arthur James Wilson (Faed Wilson) (1858–1945) was an English cyclist, cycling administrator, activist and journalist. He became deaf at age 12 after contracting scarlet fever and Faed was a self-applied anagram of 'deaf'. He was a member of the National Cyclists' Union executive committee and joint editor of the Bicycling Times and Touring Gazette. A founder member of the North Road Cycle club in 1885 he was associated with the industry, the sport, the journalism and the pastime of cycling and touring.

== Personal life ==
He began cycling at the age of eleven and became deaf at age 12 after contracting scarlet fever, Faed was a self applied anagram of deaf.

== Career ==
He joined Dunlop tyres in 1890 working at their Dublin offices. When they moved their operations to England in 1893 he worked for them as a manager in London.

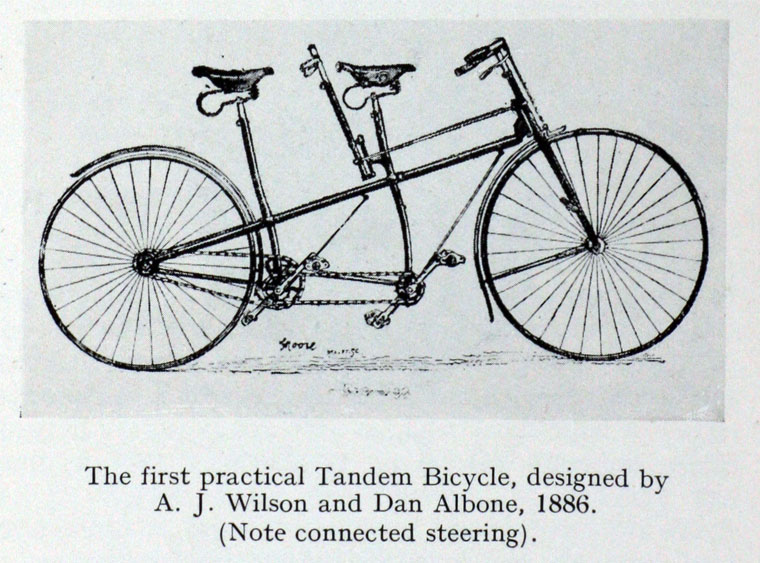
Dan Albone founded the Ivel Cycle Works in 1880 and in 1886 he and Wilson designed this tandem

In 1896 Wilson had his own advertising agency creating signs and posters when Ethel Maude Sayer joined him and his other five employees as a secretary. She had to put up with the shame of going into business and the struggle to operate in full-length skirts. Ethel could type, but she taught herself sign language so that she could interpret the things she heard for her boss. Because of her role as hearing assistant she was able to gain access to meetings that were usually men only. And because of her business skills, she became the business's company secretary when the company went public in 1899. Wilson founded the 'Cycle Trades Benevolent Fund' in 1905. Faed worked for over 50 years as an administrator of cycling, co-founding the 'North London Tricycling Club' (now renamed the 'North London Cycling Club'), the 'North Road Cycling Club', the 'Irish Road Club' and the 'Road Records Association' on 11 April 1888.

His influence ranged from the design of the tandem bicycle to the original rules for road time-trials prior to 1900.

As a cyclist he won the 1886 North Road C.C. 50 Mile Road Championship together with champion cyclist Charlie Liles on a tandem.

== The Golden Book ==
Arthur Wilson's achievements were celebrated in 1938 when Cycling Weekly awarded him his own page in the Golden Book of Cycling, which is now held in 'The Pedal Club' archive.
