= Advertising World =

Magazine

Advertising World was a magazine started in 1901 by William Berry, 1st Viscount Camrose. The magazine was based in London. It was sold in 1909.

In 1912 women in advertising were encouraged to meet at an advertising exhibition opened at the Royal Horticultural Hall organised by Advertising World.
