= Ashley Havinden =

British graphic designer

- Born: 1903
- Died: 1973 (aged 69–70)
- Occupation: Graphic designer
- Known for: Ashley Script typeface
- Honours: Royal Designers for Industry (1947)

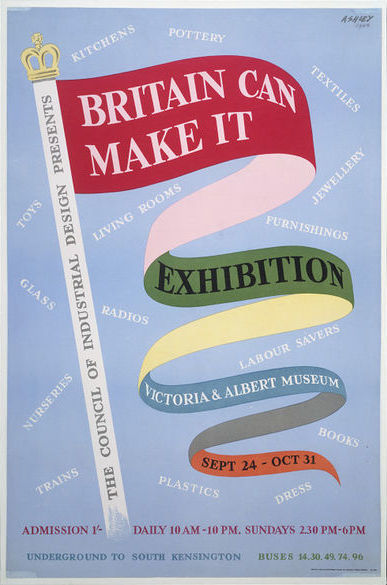
Havinden's poster for the Britain Can Make It exhibition. Council of Industrial Design, 1946.

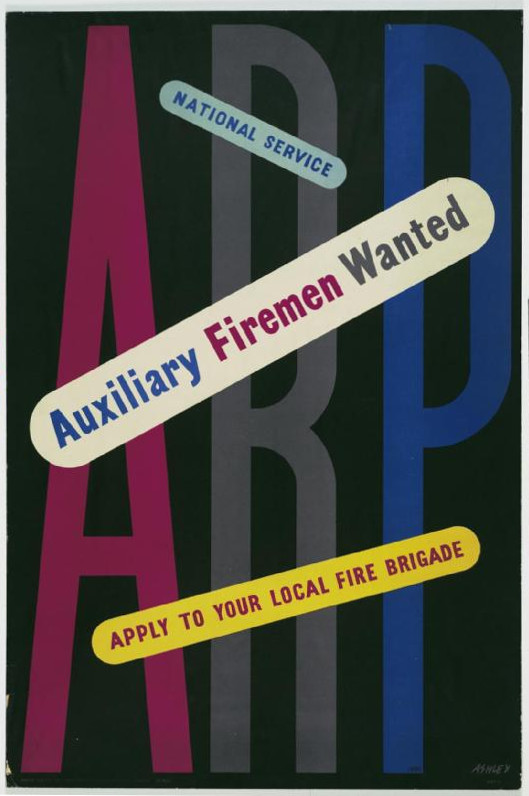
Fosh and Cross (printer), Havinden, Ashley (artist), Her Majesty's Stationery Office (publisher/sponsor)

Ashley Script Typeface

Ashley Havinden (1903–1973) was an influential British graphic designer in the mid twentieth century. Specializing in posters, advertisements, logos and typography, he was also a textile and rug designer. In 1947 he was appointed a Royal Designer for Industry.

== Early career ==
Havinden worked for the important advertising agency W.S. Crawford from the age of 19 where he was influenced by Stanley Morison who had introduced the sans serif faces for Monotype. The American designer Edward McKnight Kauffer was another influence. Havinden began to use asymmetrical layouts and new forms of lettering which he combined with the pithy words of copywriter Bingy Mills to produce a distinct style.

== Typefaces ==
For Monotype he created the font Ashley Crawford (1930). In 1955 Monotype also released the typeface Ashley Script, by which he immortalised his own handwriting in type.

== Private life ==
When Havinden joined W.S Crawfords in 1922 he worked for Margaret Sangster. She married in the following year but in 1927 she started divorce proceedings and she married Havinden in the following year. In 1929 they both became directors of Crawfords. Havinden and Margaret had two children together, whom were evacuated to America in 1940
