= John Gillard =

British teacher (1933–2000)

- Born: 14 February 1933; Biggin Hill
- Died: 28 October 2000 (aged 67); Shrewsbury
- Education: Royal College of Art
- Occupations: Graphic designer; teacher
- Years active: 1958–1995

John Anthony Gillard (14 February 1933 – 28 October 2000) was an influential British teacher of advertising and design whose notable students included Sir John Hegarty, Michael Peters, and Graham Fink. In a joint letter to Design Week magazine shortly after his death, leading figures from the creative industries (including Hegarty, Peters, and designer Mary Lewis) described Gillard as "without question the greatest inspirational teacher that the UK design and advertising industry has ever had".

== Life and career ==
Gillard grew up in Biggin Hill and studied at Beckenham School of Art and the Royal College of Art before beginning his career as an art director at The Whitefriars Press in 1958. He remained there until 1961, when he became creative director of an advertising and design consultancy.

Between 1961 and 1968, he also worked as a visiting lecturer at the London College of Printing, in the graphic design department headed by Tom Eckersley, where other notable lecturers included Rolf Brandt (brother of photographer Bill Brandt), Richard Hollis, and Robin Fior. It was here that Gillard first started to teach advertising, but (according to a 1988 interview he gave to Direction magazine) "met with such hostility from college authorities that he was obliged to adjourn his lessons to a pub after hours". At LCP, Gillard taught John Hegarty (art director and founder of advertising agency Bartle Bogle Hegarty) and designer Michael Peters; his other pupils included art director and photographer Max Forsythe, designer and Soviet design historian David King, and avant garde composer Cornelius Cardew, who studied typography and design with Gillard and went on to document his music with radically inspired, graphical scores.

Strongly influenced by groundbreaking American advertising copywriters Bill Bernbach and Howard Luck Gossage, Gillard's approach focused on using subtle and original ideas, rather than stating selling propositions in obvious or aggressive ways, and also taught the importance of "research, problem solving, and strategic planning". When Gillard later met Bernbach in the United States, he was told that "Two or three or the best people we've had here came in off the street"—an idea that strongly resonated and influenced Gillard's eclectic choice of students in the years that followed. Crucially, as copywriter David Abbott, founder of Abbott Mead Vickers BBDO, observed Gillard: "always gave his people real tasks that allowed them to gain creative judgement". Bob Connor of Brunnings Advertising later recalled that Gillard's pupils from the London College of Printing were "fresh and original, clear thinking with a different perspective. Just like him... Many of today's top creative stars came from those early beginnings".

During this part of his career, Gillard was also a visiting lecturer at Canterbury College of Art, Ealing Art College, Medway College of Art, and Middlesex Polytechnic. At Canterbury, Gillard's pupils included Paul Jackson, who went on to become CEO of Ogilvy Advertising.

From 1968 to 1974, Gillard was employed by the J. Walter Thomson advertising agency, where he was joint head of an in-house programme in creative advertising called the Conceptual Art Training Unit. For the next two years, he went back to industry, working again at an advertising and design consultancy. Between 1976 and 1985, he returned to teaching, and became principal lecturer in graphics at Berkshire College of Art and Design (later Reading College), where his pupils included Graham Fink.

=== The School of Communication Arts ===
By this time, Gillard had become disenchanted with traditional art-school education, which he considered "too precious", too theoretical and removed from everyday life, too formulaic, lacking diversity and professionalism, and with a "snobbish neglect of advertising". According to Bob Connor of Brunnings, Gillard "harboured a restlessness about the teaching system... [so] he developed his own ideas, ideas which he shared with a number of friends and supporters..." In 1985, with help from Peters, Hegarty, John Salmon, John Webster, Jeremy Sinclair, Terence Donovan, and numerous other figures from the creative world, Gillard managed to raise £110,000 to set up his own independent design college, The School of Communication Arts (SCA), and staffed it with 134 visiting lecturers from the advertising and design industries, most of whom agreed to work for nothing. As reported by The Financial Times, Gillard and his backers, "united in their disenchantment with what they regard as an inadequate training and preparation for today's business world offered by the majority of art schools, has done something about it". It was a big personal risk for Gillard, married with four children and already in his fifties, as an article in The British Journal of Photography noted: "John Gillard has swapped the security of being a Principal Lecturer at Berkshire College of Art and Design to put his reputation as a teacher and man-manager on the line. More than money, his future is at stake."

The SCA quickly achieved impressive results; by 1989, The Sunday Times noted that "The school has already built up a reputation as a fast track institution in its specialised field, with more than 80% of its people going to lucrative [advertising and design] agency jobs". Gillard's notable SCA students included Tiger Savage, who became deputy creative director and head of art of M&C Saatchi,; Adrian Rossi, who became executive creative director of Abbott Mead Vickers BBDO; and the art director and illustrator Irene von Treskow-Ahrens.

Gillard, described in the FT article as "a jumping bean of a man whose infectious enthusiasm fires every imagination it touches", ran the school for the next decade—in a manner variously described as "maverick," "stimulating and sometimes eccentric", "anti-establishment", and "controversial and colourful"—until financial difficulties and his own declining health forced its closure, and his early retirement, in 1995. According to Caroline Marshall, editor of Campaign magazine: "Gillard fought tirelessly in an ultimately doomed attempt to keep the SCA open with scant support from agencies who were prepared to spend plenty of money training account handlers and planners while underinvesting in the most important thing they have to offer, the creative product. It is a sad fact that the SCA would still have been open if London agencies had shown more interest and commitment".

The following year, Gillard was reunited with his former student Graham Fink, who had recently been elected President of D&AD (Design and Art Direction Association) and decided to refocus the organization on education. Gillard developed a self-contained creative thinking course for D&AD, which he called the "Module of Discovery and Invention", and which was taken up by various colleges, including Southampton Institute and the University of Salford.

In 1995, John Gillard and Marien de Goffau set up the School voor Commerciële Communicatie (School for Commercial Communication) in Amsterdam, and Gillard taught there for a short time during its first year. Based on the same principle of intensive training as the School of Communication Arts, it was also supported by advertising agencies and design groups. The project ran until 2007 and, in its final year, was led by Bas Strunk, the School's deputy director, who had studied at the School during its first year.

Gillard died from Parkinson's disease on 28 October 2000, aged 67.

The School of Communication Arts was relaunched in 2010 by one of the original college's former pupils, Marc Lewis, adopting a similar industry-funding model to Gillard's but with greater emphasis on equality and diversity.

=== Awards ===
Shortly after Gillard's death, D&AD set up The John Gillard Award in his memory to recognize "outstanding graduate talent". The award was announced by Sir John Hegarty and German-born designer Julia Lohmann became its inaugural recipient in 2001.

Gillard himself won four D&AD awards and the Creative Circle President's Award (for services to the creative industry) in 1986. He was an associate of the Royal College of Art.

== Influence ==
In his 30-year career, Gillard taught many of the most famous names in British design and advertising. According to The Financial Times, Gillard's "long list of distinguished pupils now working in design and advertising is testament to his skills", while a piece in The Guardian the same year suggested that "his past pupils read like a D&AD members list". Also that year, an article in The British Journal of Photography argued that few people had had "such a profound effect on the communication industry as John Gillard.... [who] has helped to make British advertising and design the envy of the world".

Gillard maintained this reputation until his death. In its obituary, Campaign magazine described him as "one of the foremost teachers of creative skills in Britain", while Michael Peters referred to him as "the guru of design arts education" with a "manic, mesmerising influence". John Hegarty has repeatedly paid tribute to Gillard's influence, calling him "the Pied Piper of Creative Talent" noting that "of the five people who have influenced my life, John Gillard is two of them", and adding that "to describe John as one of the most influential people in advertising and design is to understate his profound influence on our industry". According to Hegarty, it was Gillard who "introduced me to the work of Doyle Dane Bernbach, which for me was a seminal moment... What [Bernbach's work] did was create an entire generation who wanted to work in advertising". Graham Fink, who once quipped that John Gillard "taught me more than I know", has recalled that he "was an unbelievable teacher, very unorthodox... he got the best out of everybody. This country needs thousands of John Gillards".

Gillard was highly respected and his influence extended beyond his own pupils. In a 1986 interview with The British Journal of Photography, for example, Paul Arden, some time creative director of Saatchi and Saatchi, described his "enormous admiration" for Gillard's educational work. Copywriter David Abbott agreed, noting that "I never failed to be impressed by the people he had taught". Lamenting the closure of The School of Communication Arts, shortly after John Gillard's death, Caroline Marshall, then editor of Campaign, noted that his "fame extended far beyond this advertising village and his influence will not be forgotten".
