= Steve Gibbons (designer) =

20th and 21st-century British graphic designer

- Born: 8 October 1956 (age 70)
- Education: Bedford Modern School; Royal College of Art
- Known for: Graphic design

Steve Gibbons (born 8 October 1956) is a graphic designer and co-founder of the London based design agency Dew Gibbons.

== Life ==
Stephen John Gibbons was born on 8 October 1956. He was educated at Bedford Modern School and trained at the Royal College of Art where he graduated MA in 1982.

In 1982 Gibbons was invited by his tutor at the RCA, Brian Tattersfield, to begin a career at Minale Tattersfield, the agency that Tattersfield had co-founded in 1964 with his partner Marcello Minale. In 1985, Gibbons became a partner in another agency, The Partners, until co-founding Dew Gibbons in 1997 with Shaun Dew. Dew Gibbons was voted UK Design & Branding Consultancy of the Year in 2014 by The Drum with a focus on health and beauty brands.

Gibbons has been the recipient of two silver D&AD Awards for environmental graphics and signing schemes, and various other awards including the Chartered Society of Designers Awards, XYZ Magazine Awards, Communication Awards in the Building Industry, Donside Graphic Design and Print Awards and DBA Design Effectiveness Awards. His work has also been selected for various international awards including the Art Directors Club of New York, PDC Gold Awards USA, Creativity USA, Communication Arts USA, Graphis Switzerland, International Poster Biennale, Poland.

Gibbons has been an occasional design juror for the D&AD Awards and was a member of its executive committee until 1998. He lectures at various UK universities, is a regular contributor at conferences on graphic design and is an external moderator for the BA in Graphic Design at Kingston University.
