= David Trott =

David Trott or Dave Trott could refer to:

- Dave Trott (politician) (born 1960), American politician
- Dave Trott (advertising executive) (born 1947), English copywriter
