= Thomas Manss =

German graphic designer based in London (born 1960)

Thomas Manss (born 1960) is a German graphic designer based in London. In 2002, the British newspaper Independent on Sunday included him in their list of the ten leading graphic designers in the UK.

== Education ==
Manss studied Visual Communication at the Fachhochschule in Würzburg.

== Career ==
He began his career at Erik Spiekermann's Metadesign in Berlin where he was involved in the development of the Berlin transport information system and designed exhibition catalogues for the Kunstamt Kreuzberg. In 1985, he moved to Sedley Place Design, where he ran design programmes for some of Germany's leading companies including Volkswagen, Votex, Schering, Deutsche Bundespost and Deutsche Bundesbank.

He joined Pentagram in 1989 and worked with Alan Fletcher on design programmes for Scandinavian Airlines, The Travelstead Group, The Barbican Centre, Shakespeare's Globe and information graphics for Stansted Airport. In 1992 he was made an associate and has been responsible for the development of a new corporate identity for Shilla Hotels in Korea, exhibition designs for the Design Council and a competition for a new identity for the City of Berlin.

In 1993, Manss designed record covers for New Order and The Other Two under the art direction of Peter Saville.

In 1993 he left Pentagram to start his own studio in London followed by the opening of a German office in Berlin in 1996. Clients include British loudspeaker manufacturer Bowers & Wilkins, Canadian electronics firm Classé, Hotel Arts Barcelona, Meoclinic in Berlin, Tate Modern and Tate Britain, The British Museum, the National Portrait Gallery, accountancy firm Deloitte, Vitsœ, and International Design Center Berlin.

== Clients and work ==
Architectural clients include Foster + Partners, Hopkins Architects, Grimshaw, John McAslan + Partners, Squire and Partners, Zaha Hadid, Tadao Ando, Wilkinson Eyre and more.

His work has been widely published and his reputation is reflected by invitations to lecture in the UK, Germany and Holland. In 1994 he was appointed Visiting Professor for Corporate Identity at the Fachhochschule Potsdam and was elected a Fellow of the Chartered Society of Designers. He has been a Fellow of the Royal Society of Arts and a member of the D&AD since 1996.

For over three decades, his studio’s work has been recognised by international design awards like D&AD in the UK, German Design Award and Red Dot in Germany.

Ordnung and Eccentricity, a major survey of his work has been published by Die Gestalten Verlag in 2002. A second book titled Thomas Manss & Company written by Conway Lloyd Morgan was published by av edition in 2008.
