= Sedley Place =

Design agency

Sedley Place is a British design agency based in Clapham, London and employees 35 designers, graphic artists, architects, web designers and account teams.

== History ==
The four founding partners all met at Wolff Olins: Gerry Barney, David Bristow, Kit Cooper, Terence Griffin and set up the company in 1978. All but Barney retired from the business in 1996 after Mick Nash took over as managing director. The company operated an office in Berlin from 1987 to 2004.

Barney started his career at the Design Research Unit designing logos like the iconic British Rail logo.

The agency originally started as a graphic design agency yet evolved and increased its disciplines as client demands grew. This has been central to the agency's growth, and it now covers typography, architecture, interior design, corporate branding, packaging, 3D graphics and web design.

The agency took its name from the address of its original offices situated on Sedley Place adjacent to Oxford Street and Woodstock Street in London. This street was named after Orlando Sedley, an 18th-century furniture maker who had his workshops located there. The agency relocated to its current offices in 1985 on Venn St, Clapham.

== Key projects ==
- The Coca-Cola Piccadilly Circus sign as it appears today was designed and project managed by Sedley Place in 2003, originally the world's widest curved LED screen. They are now retained by Coca-Cola to produce all content for the sign. Sedley Place also designed the very first LED sign at Piccadilly Circus for Coca-Cola, replacing their previous neon sign.
- Sedley Place has worked with Diageo for over twenty years developing brands including Johnnie Walker (Blue, Gold, Green and Black labels), Cardhu, Talisker, Tanqueray
- VAG Rounded Typeface was created by Gerry Barney, as part of a rebranding project for VW dealerships. This font, now in the public domain, is widely used and featured on all Apple laptop and computer keyboards released before 2015 when it was replaced by San Francisco.
- From a simple verbal brief to create a spinning bottle for the Asian market the unique Revolve Bottle was created for Chivas Brothers
- Working with Michael Wolff (of Wolff Olins) Barney penned the now well known Hed Kandi record label logo

== Clients ==
- Aspria
- Audi
- Bar Coda
- Blackwood Distilleries Ltd.
- Coca-Cola
- Cumbria Tourism
- Diageo
- DLB
- Hope & Greenwood
- Inn on the Lake
- IMTV
- LeisureCorp
- Leo Burnett
- Lowe Group
- Luxe Interior
- McDonald's
- McKinney Rogers
- Moorfield (Accor/Mercure Hotels)
- Nina Campbell Ltd.
- Royal Mail
- The Gleneagles Hotel
- The World ResidenSea
- Hine Cognac Thomas Hine & Co.
- TBWA
- Tom Jago
- John Vincent Power
- Volkswagen
- William Grant & Sons

== Former employees ==
Sedley Place has employed a number of notable British designers:

- Thomas Manss
- Michael Johnson
- Petra Weisz
- Adrian Burton
- Paul McPherson
