= Julia Lohmann =

German designer (born 1977)

Julia Lohmann, HonRDI (born 1977) is a German multidisciplinary designer, educator and researcher living and working in Helsinki, Finland. As of 2025, she is an Associate Professor of Contemporary Design at Aalto University.

== Biography ==
Born in Hildesheim, Germany in 1977, Lohmann came to the United Kingdom in 1998 to study at the Surrey Institute of Art and Design, University College (now the University for the Creative Arts). She graduated in 2001 with BA (Hons) in Graphic Design and won several prizes for her graphic design and product development work.

She subsequently completed a MA in Design Products at the Royal College of Art (2004) and a Ph.D. degree "The Department of Seaweed – Co-speculative Design in a Museum Residency", supervised collaboratively by the RCA and Victoria and Albert Museum, funded by the Arts and Humanities Research Council (2018).

Upon graduation, Lohmann set up a design studio in London in 2004. Her work was selected for the ‘Design Mart’ exhibition at the Design Museum, London, by then-director Alice Rawsthorn. Since then, Lohmann's work has been shown as part of the ‘Great Brits’ touring exhibition organised by the British Council and numerous exhibitions in galleries and museums in the UK and abroad, as well as The Culture Show (BBC, 2007), in books, international magazines and newspapers.

As designer in residence at the Victoria and Albert Museum during her PhD in 2013, Lohmann founded the 'Department of Seaweed', a trans-disciplinary Community of Practice exploring seaweed as a sustainable material for making.

From 2011 to 2018, Lohmann taught as Professor for Foundations in Artistic Practices (Design) at the University of Fine Arts Hamburg. In 2018, she was appointed Professor of Practice in Contemporary Design at Aalto University in Espoo, Finland, where in 2023 she became a tenured associate professor of Contemporary Design. In 2024, Lohmann was inducted into the faculty of the Royal Society of Arts as an Honorary Royal Designer for Industry in Regenerative Design.

== Philosophy ==
Lohmann thinks that the design industry truly has power and it should not support the status quo, instead moving forward in a socially and environmentally responsible and sustainable way. She is constantly asking herself questions and design is her way of figuring out how she views the world.

Some of her design focuses on animals and dead animals; concentrating on the moment when humans mentally remove themselves from an animal's death. Her goal is to break the mental gap that people have when considering what's on their plate and how it got there. Therefore, she has focused on the nastier features of the production of food in some of her work. Some examples are a ceiling made from the stomach of sheep, a gutted carcass cast in resin, vessels made from animal bones, and porcelain jewellery made by casting frozen baby mice. Her work includes a couch shaped as a headless cow, made to illustrate the use of a number of hides in making a typical couch, so that the creased parts of the cow do not show. Whether her starting point is leather or seaweed, Lohmann's interest lies in finding capabilities in materials that no one else has. She says she finds it way more challenging if a material starts as something ‘typically’ beautiful.

== Works ==
=== Hidaka Ohmu, a pavilion made of seaweed, rattan and plywood, 2020 ===
The 'Hidaka Ohmu' seaweed pavilion was commissioned for the Cooper Hewitt, Smithsonian Design Museum exhibition 'Partnering with Nature' at the 50th World Economic Forum in Davos-Klosters, Switzerland. The pavilion was designed as a space for discussions about climate change, ocean health, ocean literacy and ocean protection, as well as the role of design and biomaterials in addressing these issues.

=== Oki Naganode, a sculpture made from seaweed, rattan and aluminium, 2013 ===
The 'Oki Naganode' is a large-scale sculpture made of Japanese Naga seaweed, treated to remain flexible and leather-like in appearance, changing colour from dark green to translucent beige as the chlorophyll in the seaweed degrades. The seaweed is stretched over a modular framework made of rattan and aluminium. The sculpture is intended to showcase the material qualities of seaweed. It has been acquired by MoMA and inspired the novelist Rob Magnuson Smith to write an imagined secret history of the work.

=== Co-existence, an installation made of 9000 petri dishes with images of bacteria colonies, perspex, lighting, 2009 ===
A window installation at the Wellcome Trust headquarters in London, inspired by the microorganisms that inhabit human bodies and presents humans as multi-species ecosystems. It consists of two representations of reclining human figures, made of 9000 Petri dishes mounted on back-lit acrylic panels. The petri dishes contain images of bacteria colonies that are positioned within the artwork based on the parts of the human body in which they most commonly live. Viewed from afar, the installation looks like pixellated images of humans, whereas viewed close-up, the Petri dishes and the microbe images they contain come to the fore.

=== Kelp Constructs, lighting objects made from seaweed, 2008 ===
This project is based on the idea that dried strips of seaweed could replace typical materiality in the creation of everyday objects. This is shown in the laser-cut lampshades. They were cut and then stretched or sewed into new shapes while still wet. Lohmann thinks that seaweed is an undervalued material, and that we consume it in things like toothpaste everyday without realizing it. It could potentially be a substitute for materials such as leather and parchment, among others. She also wants to promote seaweed's use in communities that could combine the material with their local artisanship. For example, the use of kelp on fish farms as water filters could provide extra income for struggling fishing communities.

=== Resilience, a series of concrete and wool tables, 2008 ===
This project was in reaction to research into man-made constructions that are conquered by nature and destroyed by humans; it's based on the effects of natural disasters on built structures. The series is a reversal of what qualities are normally associated with certain man-made and natural materials. The concrete is cast onto a wool backing and subsequently broken up. This design process harnesses the effects of deterioration and the wool holds the concrete together. The resulting series is a range of unique pieces based on a single mold.

=== The Catch, an installation on the over-fishing of the oceans, S-AIR/ICC, Sapporo, Japan, 2007 ===
The Catch shows how much the ocean has been depleted by over-fishing and vast consumption of marine life. Those visiting this installation are confronted with towering waves created from empty fish boxes. The visitor is led into the core, a room also made from fishing boxes and lighted by candles held in tuna vertebrae. This piece challenges the way many assume there is a limitless supply of marine life, and the lack of action as a response of scientific research.

=== The Lasting Void, resin and fiberglass stool, 2007 ===
This cast is based on the internal cavity of a calf. The reasoning was that when an animal is slaughtered, the internal organs are removed and a purposeless negative space is left. It only exists for the short period in time between when the animal becomes seen as meat. The work has been acquired by the Metropolitan Museum of Art.

- Erosion Series, furniture objects made of soap, 2007
- Cowbenches, leather benches in the shape of a cow's body, 2004
- Ruminant Bloom, lights made from preserved sheep and cow stomach, 2004
- Flock, a ceiling installation made from 50 preserved sheep stomachs, 2004

== Awards ==
- 2024, Honorary Royal Designer for Industry, Royal Society of Arts
- 2020, Dezeen Sustainable Design of the Year Award
- 2019, Artistic Achievement Award, Aalto University
- 2014, Arts Foundation Fellow for Material Innovation
- 2008, Stanley Picker Fellow Design, Stanley Picker Gallery
- 2008, 'Designer of the Future', Design Miami Basel
- 2007, Artist in Residence, S-AIR/ICC, Sapporo, Japan
- 2004, Esmee Fairbairn Foundation grant
- 2004, Selected as a ‘Great Brit’, for the eponymous British Council touring design exhibition
- 2004, 1st Prize Qatar Logo Competition, ‘Qatar Costume Museum’ identity
- 2001, 2 IF Design Award, ‘Best of Category’ for Ecology and Product Design
- 2001, Red Dot Design Award
- 2001, 1st prize, D&AD student award, Product Development
- 2001, 1st prize, Inaugural John Gillard Award, Best Design Student on Show

== Bibliography ==
- ‘Twenty-first Century Design – new design icons, from mass market to avant-garde’, Marcus Fairs (Ed.), Carlton Books, London, UK
- ‘&Fork’, (100 contemporary designers selected by 10 curators) Phaidon Press, London, UK
