= Johnson Banks =

Graphic design company

- Type: Limited company
- Industry: Brand consultancy
- Founded: London 1992
- Founder: Michael Johnson
- Headquarters: London, United Kingdom
- Website: johnsonbanks.co.uk

Johnson Banks is a design consultancy in London founded in 1992 by Michael Johnson. The company specialises in brand consultancy and visual identity systems, focusing on work in the cultural, government and charity sectors.

== Work ==
The organisation's work includes rebranding charities Shelter, Christian Aid, and the 2010 rebrand of London's Science Museum.

As well as branding the company has also conducted several experimental typography projects. These projects include a bilingual typeface based on Japanese katakana, a pictographic symbol set based on Mandarin characters. In January 2012, in collaboration with Ravensbourne college, they created 'Arkitypo' – a typographic alphabet using 3D prototyping techniques.

=== Postage stamps ===
The consultancy claimed that their 2003 Fruit and Vegetable collection was inspired by the children's toys Mr. Potato Head and Fuzzy-Felt. The set included additional stickers so users could customise the stamps with moustaches, hats and legs, glasses and shoes. The Fruit and Vegetable stamps won the Design and Art Direction's black pencil award.

In 2007, to celebrate the 50th anniversary of John Lennon and Sir Paul McCartney's first meeting, Royal Mail commissioned The Beatles Collection. Barring Royal issues, The Royal Mail sold more copies of The Beatles' stamps than any other series.

=== Yellow Pages ===
In 1999, the Yellow Pages hired the company to update the telephone directory, reduce the amount of pages in the directory and accommodate longer dialling code changes of the late 90's. The organisation designed a condensed Typeface that used contracted ascenders and descenders to save space.

=== Mozilla ===
The company led Mozilla's 2016 open design rebrand. Mozilla posted each iteration of Johnson Banks' proposed logos on their blog. After reviewing the blog's comments, they decided on and developed a final logo informed by public opinion.

=== Selected branding projects ===
- Christian Aid, UK (2005)
- More Than (2001)
- Shelter, UK (2004)
- Virgin Atlantic (2010)

=== Album covers ===
- Pink Floyd The Later Years

=== Other work ===
- World Questions, King's answers for King's College London (UK, 2010/12)

== Awards and recognition ==
The company has won a number of awards including seven D&AD "yellow pencils", one D&AD "black pencil", 13 Design Week Awards, four Art Directors Club of New York "cubes" and six distinctive merits.
