= Volland =

Volland may refer to:

- Volland, Kansas, a community in the United States
- 11056 Volland, main belt asteroid
- Volland-Stern Model, geomagnetism model
- P. F. Volland Company, a publisher

== People ==
- Kevin Volland (born 1992), German footballer
- Michael Volland (born 1974), British Anglican priest and academic
- Ernst Volland (born 1946), German artist, photographer, cartoonist, gallerist, curator and writer
- Sophie Volland, a correspondent and a mistress of Denis Diderot

== See also ==
- Voland
