= Michael Johnson (graphic designer) =

British graphic designer (born 1964)

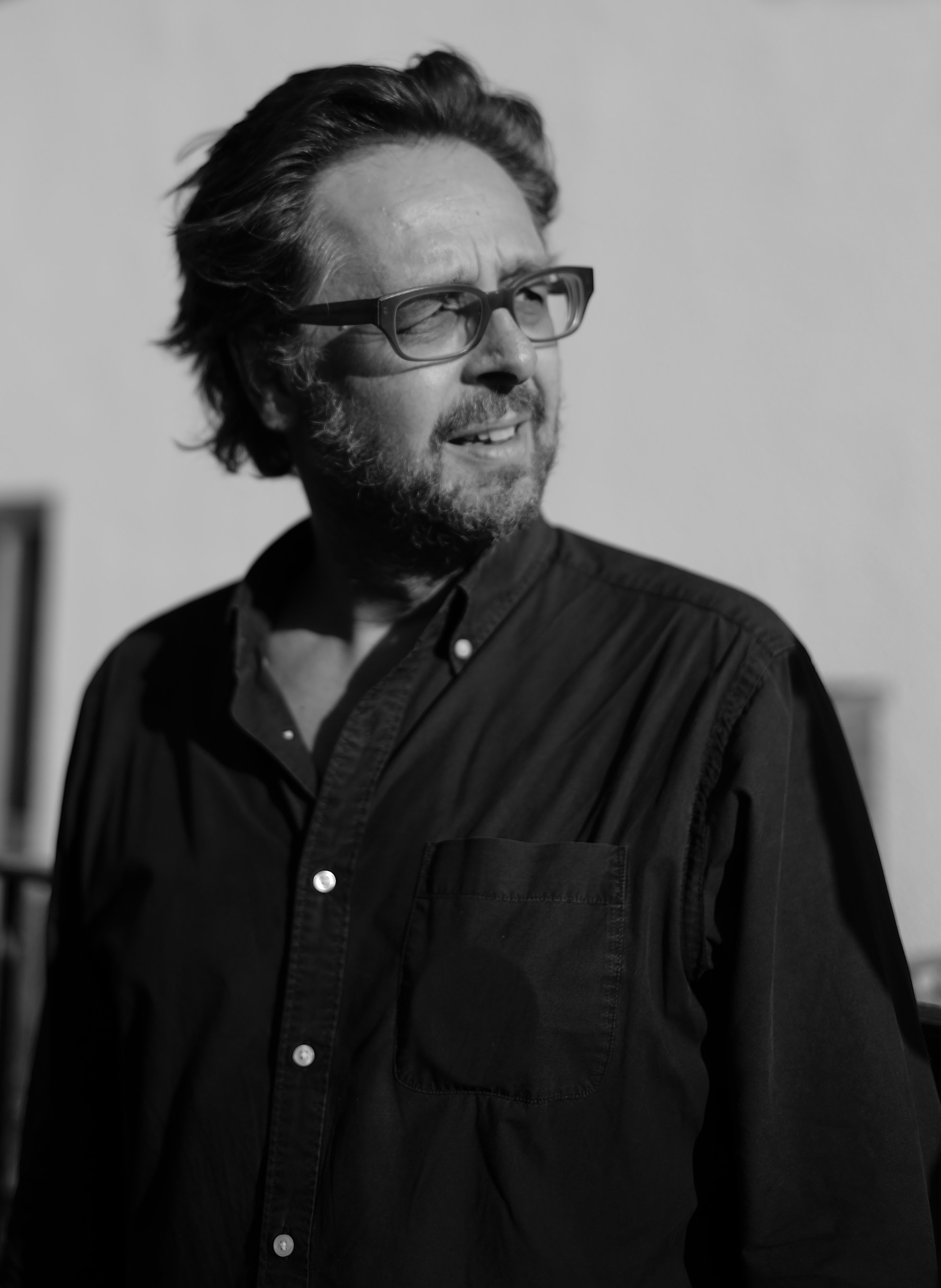
- Johnson in 2017
- Born: 26 April 1964 (age 62); Derby, England, UK
- Occupation: Graphic designer
- Website: www.johnsonbanks.co.uk

Michael Johnson (born 1964, Derby) is a British designer and brand consultant. In 1992 he founded the design studio Johnson Banks in London, UK. Johnson received the Design and Art Direction (D&AD) black pencil award for his fruit and veg stamp designs and the organisation's President's award in 2017. Johnson has published three books and the Victoria and Albert Museum (V&A) have nineteen of his designs in their permanent collection.

== Career ==
After graduating Michael worked as a designer and consultant for Wolff Olins, Sedley Place, and Dentsu, Tokyo.

In 1992 he set up Johnson Banks and went on to advise and create brands for clients including Virgin Atlantic, Science Museum (UK), Shelter (UK), The Guggenheim Foundation (New York, USA), Sendai Space Observatory (Japan) and Pew Center for Arts and Culture (Philadelphia, USA). Johnson has designed posters and stamps such as The Beatles for Royal Mail in 2006.

In addition Johnson writes for many design journals, judges design competitions and lectures worldwide as far afield as Toronto, Tokyo, Berlin and Goa on branding, identity issues and design history. He has won some design industry awards. Specifically, eight D&AD 'pencils', and he presided over the organisation in 2003. Johnson has nineteen designs in the V&A's permanent collection. D&AD named his as the seventh most awarded designer in its history in its fifty-year celebrations in 2012. The second edition of his first book Problem Solved was published in autumn 2012.

Johnson designed 1993's Fruit and Vegetable stamps and The Beatles album cover stamps.

== Awards and recognition ==
=== D&AD Awards ===
- President's Award 2017
- 7 D&AD Silver awards ('yellow pencils'; 1991, 1993, 1997, 1999, 2002, 2003 and 2004)
- 1 D&AD Gold award ('black pencil') for 'Fruit & veg stamps'

=== Art Directors Club of New York Awards ===
Four Art Directors Club of New York 'cubes' and six distinctive merits:

- Gold: Beatles Stamps (87th Awards, 2008)
- Gold: The Watch Gallery (72nd Awards, 1993)
- Silver: Fruit & Veg stamps (83rd Awards, 2004)
- Bronze: Glenfiddich Barrel Art (88th Awards, 2009)

=== Other Awards ===
- 1 best of category (2008) from American ID magazine
- Design Week Hot 50, listed 2003, 2004, 2008, 2010, 2011
- Shortlisted, BBC Design awards 1996

== Exhibitions ==
- Words and Pictures – the design work of Michael Johnson and johnson banks at Creation Gallery Ginza, Japan in 2004
- Arkitypo at the Arup Phase 2 space, London in 2012

== Bibliography ==
=== As author ===
- Johnson, Michael (2002).Problem Solved: a primer in design and communication. First edition. London, UK: Phaidon Press. ISBN 9780714844534
- Johnson, Michael (2012).Problem Solved: a primer in design and communication. Second edition. London, UK: Phaidon Press. ISBN 978-0714864730
- Johnson, Michael (2016).Branding: In Five and a Half Steps. First edition. London, UK: Thames & Hudson. ISBN 9780500518960

=== As contributor ===
- Myerson, Jeremy et al. (2004).Rewind: 40 years of design and advertising. London, UK: Phaidon Press. ISBN 9780714844602
- Heller, Steven (2004). The Education of a Typographer. New York, USA: Allworth Press. ISBN 978-1581153484.

=== Solo monographs ===
- Johnson Banks; Fletcher, Alan (2005). Johnson Banks (Design & Designer). France: Pyramyd editions. ISBN 978-2350170046
