= David King (graphic designer) =

British designer and collector (1943–2016)

- Born: 30 April 1943; Isleworth, England
- Died: 11 May 2016 (aged 73); London, England
- Education: University College School; London School of Printing
- Occupations: Graphic designer; collector; photographer; historian; writer
- Years active: 1960–2015
- Notable work: The Commissar Vanishes

David King (30 April 1943 – 11 May 2016) was a British graphic designer, design historian, and writer, who assembled one of the largest collections of Soviet graphics and photographs. From this collection, he created a series of books covering the history of the Russian Revolution and its associated art and propaganda. In addition to Soviet-era photographs, posters, and other materials, his collection included items related to the Spanish Civil War, Maoist China, the Weimar Republic, and American labour organizations. King, a "leftist with Trotskyist leanings", in particular collected photographs and ephemera related to Leon Trotsky, who was extensively doctored out of revolutionary photographs and records under Joseph Stalin's regime.

King worked at The Sunday Times Magazine as a designer and art editor. His design work also extended to album covers for artists like Jimi Hendrix; book covers radical and progressive publishers, including Allison and Busby and Earthscan Publications; and graphics for political causes he supported, such as the Anti-Apartheid Movement. He is the creator of the Anti-Nazi League's red-and-yellow logo. King described his work as an attempt "to create a visual style for the left."

== Early life and education ==
King was born in 1943 in Isleworth. His father Stanley was a bank manager. The family lived in northwest London, in South Kenton and then in Northwood. (Note: Poynor, pp. 20.)

King attended University College School, then studied typography at the London School of Printing and Graphic Arts (now the London College of Communication), (Note: Poynor, pp. 20.) from which he graduated in 1963. He was taught by several notable designers, including Tom Eckersley, Richard Hollis and Robin Fior. Fior, who designed for the magazines Peace News and International Socialism, was a particularly strong influence. He introduced King to Soviet Constructivist revolutionary graphics and political art and to the work of John Heartfield, both important influences on King's later work as a designer and visual historian. Fior also introduced King to the typeface Franklin Gothic Bold, which King used extensively in his later designs. As a student, King assisted Fior with his poster work for the Campaign for Nuclear Disarmament (CND) and on the design of the magazine Peace News. (Note: Poynor, pp. 22–23.)

== Career ==
After graduating from the London College of Printing (renamed from the London School of Printing and Graphic Arts) in 1963, King worked as an art assistant on the magazine Queen and then for the advertising agency Stratton & Wolsey. In 1965, King joined the staff of The Sunday Times Magazine, (Note: Poynor, pp. 22–23.) where he collaborated with art director Michael Rand to transform the magazine's visual identity. While working on a feature for The Sunday Times in 1970, King made his first trip to the Soviet Union to collect materials on Vladimir Lenin, which were plentiful. However, he was unable to find any materials related to Leon Trotsky, despite Trotsky's importance during the Russian Revolution. King, who admired Trotsky, then began to collect his photographs and memorabilia to counteract the suppression of his image under Stalin. He uncovered many unknown images of Trotsky, and in 1972, he published his first book, Trotsky: A Documentary, with text by the Sunday Times writer Francis Wyndham.

While at The Sunday Times, King also worked as a freelance graphic designer in the record business, designing covers for The Who Sell Out, The Crazy World of Arthur Brown, and Axis: Bold as Love. His design for the 1968 Jimi Hendrix album Electric Ladyland generated controversy as it featured a David Montgomery photograph of 19 nude women, which King intended as a contrast to the image of women found in Playboy magazine. The photo was considered too risqué for the US edition of the album and was replaced by a picture of Hendrix. King, a self-taught photographer, additionally documented the training sessions of Muhammad Ali before his 1974 match with George Foreman. In 1975, the photographs were published in I Am King: A Photographic Biography of Muhammad Ali.

In the 1970s, King created posters and graphics for many political groups, including the Anti-Apartheid Movement and the National Union of Journalists. He originated the red-and-yellow arrow logo for the Anti-Nazi League and designed posters for Rock Against Racism concerts and marches. He also designed book covers for radical and progressive publishers, including Allison and Busby and Earthscan Publications, as well as for mainstream publishers, such as Penguin Books.

From 1979 to 1985, King was commissioned by David Elliott, then-curator of the Museum of Modern Art Oxford (now Modern Art Oxford), to design a series of catalogues and posters for the following Soviet art exhibitions: Alexander Rodchenko, Vladimir Mayakovsky: Twenty Years of Work, and Art Into Production: Soviet Textiles, Fashion and Ceramics 1917–1935. This work would later be featured in the 2016 exhibit David King: Designs for Oxford (1979–1985).

King devoted his later career to uncovering and chronicling the art of the Soviet and the Constructivist periods, with a focus on the doctoring of photographs and the accompanying process of historical revisionism. He published the result of his research in books, which include The Commissar Vanishes: The Falsification of Photographs and Art in Stalin’s Russia (1997), Ordinary Citizens: The Victims of Stalin (2003), and Red Star Over Russia: A Visual History of the Soviet Union From the Revolution to the Death of Stalin (2009). He also published a second book on Trotsky, Trotsky: A Photographic Biography, in 1986. King's book became the basis of an audiovisual collaboration with composer Michael Nyman, who created a soundtrack to The Commissar Vanishes, which was first performed at the Barbican Centre, London, in 1999.

King's collection grew to more than 250,000 items, which have formed the basis for a series of exhibitions and a special gallery in the Tate Modern. Stephen F. Cohen, a professor of Russian studies, described King's work as "a one-man archaeological expedition into the lost world, the destroyed world, of the original Soviet leadership. He was determined to unearth everything that Stalin had buried so deeply and so bloodily."

== Death ==
King died of a heart attack at his London home on 11 May 2016. He was survived by his partner, sister, daughter, son, and two grandchildren.

== Legacy ==
The Tate acquired the David King Collection, which includes more than 150,000 items "relating to the Russian revolutionary period, the Soviet Union and communist China" in June 2016. In 2020, Yale University Press published Rick Poynor's book David King: Designer, Activist, Visual Historian. Poynor and Eye magazine art director Simon Esteron also set up a website in support of the book; the site contains designs by King from his private archives.

== Works ==
- Trotsky: A Documentary, Penguin Books, 1972, ISBN 978-0140035223
- I Am King: a photographic biography of Muhammad Ali. Penguin, 1975, ISBN 0140040889
- How the GPU Murdered Trotsky, 1977, by the International Committee of the Fourth International, illustrations by David King
- David Elliott & David King: Alexander Rodchenko. Museum of Modern Art Oxford, 1979, ISBN 090583612X
- David Elliott & David King: Mayakovsky: Twenty Years of Work. 1982, ISBN 090583626X
- David King & Cathy Porter: Blood & Laughter: Caricatures from the 1905 Revolution. 1983, ISBN 0224021559
- David Elliott & David King: Art into Production: Soviet Textiles, Fashion and Ceramics, 1917–35., 1984, ISBN 0905836472
- Isaac Deutscher & David King: The Great Purges. 1984, ISBN 0631139230
- Trotsky: a photographic biography. 1986, ISBN 063114689X, by David King, Tamara Deutscher (introduction), James Ryan (commentary)
- The Commissar Vanishes, Metropolitan Books/Canongate Books, 1997, ISBN 978-0-86241-724-6.
- Ordinary Citizens: The Victims of Stalin. 2003, ISBN 1903427150
- Red Star Over Russia: A Visual History of the Soviet Union. 2009, ISBN 978-1-854376862
- Russian Revolutionary Posters: From Civil War to Socialist Realism, from Bolshevism to the End of Stalinism. 2012, ISBN 1849760195
- David King & Ernst Volland: John Heartfield: Laughter is a Devastating Weapon. 2015, ISBN 978-1849761840
