= Wally Olins =

British brand consultant

Wally Olins CBE
- Olins in 2013
- Born: Wallace Olins; 19 December 1930; London, England
- Died: 14 April 2014 (aged 83)
- Education: Highgate School
- Alma mater: St Peter's College, Oxford
- Occupation: Branding consultant
- Spouses: Renate Steinart (m. 1957; div. 1989) Dornie Watts (m. 1990)

Wallace Olins CBE (19 December 1930 – 14 April 2014) was a British branding consultant specializing in corporate identity and branding. He co-founded Wolff Olins and Saffron Brand Consultants and served as chairman of both. Olins advised organisations on identity, branding, communication and related matters, including 3i, Akzo Nobel, Repsol, Q8, the Portuguese Tourist Board, BT, Renault, Volkswagen, Tata and Lloyd's of London. He also advised McKinsey and Bain. He pioneered the concept of the nation as a brand and worked on branding projects for a number of cities and countries, including London, Mauritius, Northern Ireland, Poland, Portugal and Lithuania.

== Biography ==
Olins was educated at Highgate School in north London. After studying history at St Peter's College, Oxford, he went into advertising in London. His first big job was as head of the agency that became Ogilvy and Mather in Mumbai, where he lived for five years.

He returned to London and in 1965 co-founded Wolff Olins with Michael Wolff, and was the chairman. He founded Saffron Brand Consultants in 2001 with Jacob Benbunan, an ex-colleague from Wolff Olins.

He was a visiting professor at many Business Schools around the world and spoke on branding and communications issues globally.

== Death ==
Olins died on 14 April 2014, aged 83.

== Awards and recognition ==
Olins was appointed a CBE in 1999. He was nominated for the Prince Philip Designers Prize in 1999 and received the Royal Society of Arts’ Bicentenary Medal in 2000. He was given the D&AD President's Award in 2003 and the Reputation Institute's first ever Lifetime Achievement Award in 2006. Olins was an Honorary Fellow of St. Peter's College Oxford and in 2013 was awarded an Honorary Professorship at UPC in Lima, Peru.

== Books ==
Over 250,000 copies of his books have been sold in 18 languages, including the seminal works ‘Corporate Identity’, 'On Brand', and 'The Brand Handbook'. His last book, 'Brand New – The Shape of Brands to Come', was published by Thames & Hudson in April 2014.

- "Brand New – The Shape of Brands to Come" 2014
- "Wally Olins -The Brand Handbook" 2008
- "Wally Olins – On Brand" 2003
- "Trading Identities" 1999
- "The New Guide to Identity" 1995
- "Corporate Identity" 1989
- "The Corporate Personality: an inquiry into the nature of corporate identity" 1978
