= Michael Wolff (graphic designer) =

British graphic designer, co-founder of Wolff Olins

- Born: 12 November 1933 (age 92); London, England
- Occupation: Graphic designer
- Known for: Co-founder, Wolff Olins
- Website: wolff.eu.com

Michael Wolff (born 12 November 1933) is a British graphic designer and consultant on brands and corporate identity. He co-founded the international branding agency Wolff Olins.

== Biography ==
Michael Wolff was born in London on 12 November 1933 to Russian parents fleeing post-Soviet revolutionary persecution. He grew up in London during WW2 and attended various preparatory schools before being evacuated to a small village in South Devon. He attended Caldicott School in Farnham Royal and then Gresham’s School in Norfolk. In 1951 Wolff was accepted into the AA School of Architecture.

As a child, he was fascinated by color. He remembered the distinctive shade of blue on his tricycle and the dark green sweater he wore during his time in the Wolf Cubs, saying that, “...colour became a primary source of pleasure.” This fascination led him into his career as a graphic designer and influence his graphic design work, where he often used bold and vivid hues.

== Wolff Olins ==
In the early 1960s Wolff went into partnership with James Main in Camden Town, London and Wally Olins joined a few years later. In 1965 Wolff Olins was formed and became corporate identity specialists consulting to Volkswagen/Audi, Renault, The Labour Party, Apple Records, Camden Council, Citigroup, 3i, Waterstones, WHSmith and Bovis amongst others.

Wolff left Wolff Olins in the 1980s to work for various corporate clients, before founding Michael Wolff and Company which he currently leads.

Wolff's approach emphasizes both the importance of supporting companies with their products and services as well as communicating the cultural parts that shape their impact.

== Awards and patronages ==
In 2009 Wolff was made a senior fellow of the RCA. In 2012 he was appointed visiting professor at the Central Saint Martins College of Art and Design. He is a former president of both the D&AD (Design and Art Directors Association) and the Chartered Society of Designers. In 2011 Wolff was made an RDI (RSA's Faculty of Royal Designers for Industry).

Wolff is patron of the Inclusive Design Challenge with the Helen Hamlyn Centre at the Royal College of Art, a member of the Government sponsored Design and Technology Alliance against crime and a former chairman of the Legible London initiative with Transport for London.

In 2021 Wolff was awarded the Lifetime Achievement Medal by the London Design Festival.

== Publications ==
Wolff's book Leap Before You Look – The Heart And Soul Of Branding was published in 2024 by Library Street. He collaborated with NB Studio and writer Tom Lynham to create the book that has all of his ideas as well as his work and life story in a very visual aspect.
