= Marcello Minale =

Italian designer (1938–2000)

Marcello Minale (December 15, 1938 – December 30, 2000) was a world-renowned Italian designer, writer and a former international oarsman.

== Early life ==
Marcello Minale was born into an Italian naval family in Tripoli in 1938, the son of a colonial administrator and former naval captain who became a local city mayor in Aziziya, Libya.

== Education and formative influences ==
After studying art and architecture at the Technical Institute of Naples, Minale won his first assignments for an architectural magazine in Milan and for a Scandinavian company in charge of interior design and graphic design in Rome.

Minale worked briefly for the Young & Rubicam advertising agency in Rome before moving to Finland in 1961 to be part of the golden age of Scandinavian design working firstly as a designer for Taucker and then as Art director for Mackkinointi Uiherjuuri – both Finnish advertising agencies.

It was at the Industrial Design School in Helsinki where Minale was introduced to Scandinavian Modernism – amongst his seminal influences were the Finnish designers Tapio Wirkkala and Alvar Aalto whose style was a world away from the Baroque Italian household in which he had grown up.

== Work ==
In 1962, Minale came to Britain to work as a designer in London, again for Young & Rubicam and met his future partner Brian Tattersfield.

Two years later, the duo formed Minale Tattersfield during a period that coincided with a new generation of young London design firms including Wolff Olins and Fletcher/Forbes/Gill. These fledgling firms were jettisoning the old commercial-artist tradition in favour of a more simple and pared-down style of visual communication much influenced by Bill Bernbach in New York.

Minale sought to raise the profile of the firm's early work. The firm introduced its own corporate logo – the "Scribble", a loose, free-form, pencil-drawn counterblast to the formal graphic conventions of the period. With Tattersfield focusing on different aspects of the business, the partnership expanded its activities and client base. Its client list grew to include: Thames TV, Kodak, London Transport, British Airports Authority, Nestle, Harrods, NatWest, Armani, Premier League, Eurostar, Imperial War Museum, International Cricket Council, Sydney Olympics and many more.

== Design establishment contribution ==
Minale contributed widely to the British design community, helping to launch and fund Blueprint, and over the years became a mentor to many young designers. A favorite phrase of his was “keep moving”, and his energy, thoughtfulness and generosity of spirit inspired many who worked with him. Minale was President of D&AD between 1981–2 and a Fellow of the Chartered Society of Designers.

Minale also contributed to the design establishment as an author and was published a variety of books on visual identity, branding and the business of design including the only design-led book looking at the modern service station. He also devoted time and energy to writing and to illustrating four children's books.

In his obituary Marcello Minale was described by Jeremy Myerson in The Independent as 'one of British commercial design's most colourful and original practitioners' and 'a man of wide interests whose flair and expertise put him at the forefront of British design for three decades.'

== Awards ==
Minale Tattersfield has received more than 300 international awards for design creativity and design effectiveness. They include: 13 Silver awards from the D&AD – the prestigious President's Award for outstanding contribution to British Design, and 3 Gold awards from Art Directors Club of New York. In 2012 Minale was named eighth most awarded designer of the last five decades by the D&AD with a posthumous Lifetime Achievement: Designer Award.

== Personal life ==
Away from design, Minale's two great passions were his family and his rowing:

- Minale was twice married: first in 1963 (source: freebmd.org.uk) (dissolved 1974), to Ebba Oljemark, with whom he had a son, Marcello; and second in 1975, to Roberta Broadbridge, with whom he had two sons Manlio, a brand consultant and Massimo, who is studying architecture at Cambridge.
- An international medal winner in rowing at the 1956 European Championships, Minale's love of the sport remained firm, becoming the chairman and President of the Tideway Scullers School between 1995 and 2000.

== Published works ==
=== Design books ===
- How to design a successful petrol station, Booth-Clibborn Editions, 2000 (ISBN 978-1861541352)
- How to Keep on Running a Successful Design Company, Booth Clibborn Editions, 1999 (ISBN 978-1861541307)
- All Together Now, (ISBN 1861540671) Booth-Clibborn Editions, 1998
- How to Run & Run a Successful Multidisciplinary Design Company, Internos Books, 1996 (ISBN 978-1873968796)
- The Leader of the Pack, Elfande, 1993 (ISBN 1 870458 50 8)
- Minale Tattersfield Creative Unit, 1965 (ASIN: B001P534KC)
- The Image Maker: Biography of Minale Tattersfield, Booth-Clibborn Editions, 1995 (ISBN 978-1873968536)
- Design: The World of Minale Tattersfield, Booth Clibborn Editions, 1990 (ISBN 0904866777)
- The Best of British Corporate Design, Booth Clibborn Editions, (ISBN 978-0904866681), 1989
- Best of British Packaging, Booth Clibborn Editions, 1988
- Design a la Minale Tattersfield, Booth Clibborn Editions, 1986/7

=== Children's books ===
- Tomo the Water Dragon, Dobson Books Ltd, 1977 (ISBN 978-0234771716)
- The Black Pencil, Dobson Books Ltd, 1974 (ISBN 978-0234779064)
- Tree That Couldn't Fly, Dobson Books Ltd, 1972 (ISBN 978-0234776414)
- Creatures Great and Small, 1965 (ASIN B000K6JR5I)

== Design work ==
=== Furniture, industrial and interior design ===
- 'MTP 1' chair designed by Minale Tattersfield & Partners Ltd. for MTP Furniture, 1972. (VADS)
- 'Grid' armchair with frame designed by Minale Tattersfield & Partners Ltd. for MTP Furniture, 1972.
- Ceramic wall tiles designed by Minale Tattersfield & Partners Ltd. for Cedit, Italy, 1969.
- Bench for use on underground station platforms. Designed by Minale Tattersfield & Partners Ltd. as part of proposals for the modernisation of Northern Line stations for London Transport, c. 1977. (VADS)
- Various furniture designs by Marcello Minale
- Shower system designed by Minale Tattersfield & Partners Ltd. for Aqualisa, 1978. (VADS)
- Base of knock-down table designed by Minale Tattersfield & Partners Ltd. for Zanotta, 1976
- Cast iron road signs for Much Wenlock in Shropshire, commemorating Queen Elizabeth II's Silver Jubilee, 1977 (VADS)
- Posters and other examples of graphic design with chairs and tables designed for Zanotta, MTP Furniture and Cubic Metre Furniture. 1980.

=== Posters ===
- Mural/wall panels with cricket ball motif for the Oval underground station, c. 1977. (VADS)
- British Airports at The Design Center, Museum of Modern Art (poster), 1980 (MoMA)
- Milton Keynes will be good for your health , poster, 1973 (V&A)
- Milton Keynes. The kind of city you'll want your family to grow up in (poster), 1973 (V&A)
- Where is Milton Keynes? (poster), 1973 (V&A)
- Milton Keynes. A new city comes to life (poster), 1972 (V&A)
- Milton Keynes: The City's Future (poster), 1970 (V&A)
- Cubic Metre (poster), (V&A)
