= Blueprint (magazine) =

British architecture and design magazine

- Editor: Johnny Tucker
- Categories: Architecture & Design
- Frequency: Bi-Monthly (6 issues per year)
- Founder: Peter Murray; Deyan Sudjic
- First issue: 1983
- Final issue Number: 2020; 369
- Company: Timetric
- Country: United Kingdom
- Based in: London
- Language: English
- Website: DesignCurial
- ISSN: 0268-4926

Blueprint was an architecture and design magazine published in the UK between 1983 and 2020.

It offered a mix of criticism, news and feature writing on design and architecture, directed at professionals and non-professionals alike.

Blueprint takes architecture and design as its starting point and brings these thing into sharp focus via context, comment and analysis. Architecture and design do not exist in a vacuum. – Johnny Tucker, former Blueprint editor

The magazine took a parallel approach to the different design disciplines, reflecting a belief that fashion, product, furniture and architectural design can share ideas.

== History ==
Blueprint was first published in October 1983 by Peter Murray and Deyan Sudjic. It was launched and funded by UK design figures including Terence Conran, Marcello Minale and Richard Rogers.

In 1983, Murray noticed a gap in the market for a magazine that presented lavish images and a critical analysis of the industry. He enlisted Sunday Times architecture critic Deyan Sudjic as editor, who in turn recruited a team of writers including Jonathan Glancey, Rowan Moore and Rick Poynor. Sudjic continued to edit Blueprint until 1994.

Blueprint's subsequent contributors included novelist JG Ballard, cultural critic James Heartfield and art critic Matthew Collings. It has been edited by Sudjic, (who, since 2006, was director of the London Design Museum), architect and critic Rowan Moore. Vicky Richardson edited the magazine from 2004 until 2010. The last editor was Johnny Tucker.

Blueprint was published on a monthly basis until 2013 when the frequency was switched to bimonthly. The 369th issue of Blueprint was the last edition published in June 2020.
