= Feminist design =

Feminist design refers to connections between feminist perspectives and design. Feminist design can include feminist perspectives applied to design disciplines like industrial design, graphic design and fashion design, and parallels work like feminist urbanism, feminist HCI and feminist technoscience. Feminist perspectives can touch any aspect of the design project including processes, artifacts and practitioners.

== History ==
There is a long history of feminist activity in design. Early examples include movements for dress reform (mid–19th century) and concepts for utopian feminist cities (late 19th century to the early 20th century). Over time this work has explored topics like beauty, DIY, feminine approaches to architecture, community-based and grassroots projects, among many examples. Some iconic writing includes Cheryl Buckley's essays on design and patriarchy and Judith Rothschild's Design and feminism: Re-visioning spaces, places, and everyday things.

== Scope ==
Some scholars suggest that all designers should be feminists, as drawn by Chimamanda Ngozi Adichie, approaching feminism not only through gender but through power.

“Not surprisingly, feminist approaches to design have generally been concerned with the relationship between women and design-how they are affected by it and how their contributions to it are regarded. These two inquiries have been thoroughly investigated in existing literature. Historically, they tended to be based on universal accounts of women, which assumed a cisgender, white, heterosexual, able-bodied woman. Only recently has the work expanded to advance our under- standing of the ways in which the impacts of design are felt at the intersections of gender and race, class, and other identities. Most feminist discourse in design seems to imply that the problems raised would not be problems if more designers were women and if their perspectives were valued.”

== Feminist insights for design ==
Isabel Prochner's research explored how feminist perspectives can support positive change in industrial design. She stressed the diversity of feminist perspectives, but also argued that they can help identify systemic social problems and inequities in design and guide socially sustainable and grassroots design solutions. She wrote that feminist perspectives in industrial design often support:

- "Emphasizing human life and flourishing over output and growth
- Following best practices in labor/ international production /trade
- Choosing an empowering workspace
- Engaging in non-hierarchical/ interdisciplinary/ collaborative work
- Addressing user needs at multiple levels, including support for pleasure/ fun/ happiness
- Creating thoughtful products for female users
- Creating good jobs through production/ execution/ sale of the design solution"

== Related pages ==
- Inclusive design
- Dolores Hayden
- Intersectionality
- Data Feminism
- Nina Paim
- Futuress
- Cyberfeminism

== Bibliography ==
- Lupton, Ellen; Kafei, Farah; Tobias, Jennifer; Halstead, Josh A.; Sales, Kaleena; Xia, Leslie; Vergara, Valentina (2020-11-05). "Extra Bold". PA Press.
- Otto, Elizabeth; Rossler, Patrick (2019). Bauhaus Women: A Global Perspective. Bloomsbury Publishing. ISBN 1912217961.
