= Jeremy Myerson =

British journalist and author (born 1956)

Jeremy Myerson (born 1956) is a British journalist, academic and author, recognised for his contributions to inclusive and workplace design. He co-founded the Helen Hamlyn Centre for Design at the Royal College of Art (RCA), where he served as its director for 16 years, and holds the title of Professor Emeritus at the RCA. He has advocated for the consideration of aging, healthcare, and the workplace in design. He is also the author of over 20 books and has curated exhibitions on design.

== Early life and education ==
Myerson was born in Liverpool in 1956 and later studied at the University of Hull and the Royal College of Art, where he earned degrees.

== Career ==
Myerson began his professional career as a journalist in the arts, with positions including working for The Stage, Design, and Creative Review. From 1986 to 1989, he was the founding editor of DesignWeek, the world's first weekly news magazine for designers.

In 1999, Myerson co-founded the Helen Hamlyn Centre for Design at the Royal College of Art, focusing on inclusive design. He served as its director until 2015, leading interdisciplinary research projects that explored the intersection of design and societal issues. During his tenure, the Centre introduced various design innovations and participatory processes for marginalised groups.

He was instrumental in establishing several initiatives at the RCA, including the InnovationRCA incubator, the Helix Centre at St Mary's Hospital (a joint venture with Imperial College London), and the Design Age Institute. In addition to his role at the Helen Hamlyn Centre, Myerson has been involved with design and research organisations. He is a Visiting Professorial Fellow at the Oxford Institute of Population Ageing at Oxford University and the academic chair of the Healthy City Design Congress. Myerson also chairs the Learning and Research Committee at the Design Museum. In 2016, he became the inaugural director of WORKTECH Academy, an online knowledge-sharing platform that examines the future of work and workplace design.

Myerson is the author of more than twenty books covering a wide range of design, architecture, and technology topics. Some of his works include Unworking: The Reinvention of the Modern Office (2022), Designing a World for Everyone: 30 Years of Inclusive Design (2021), New Old: Design for Our Future Selves (2017), and Time & Motion: Redefining Working Life (2014).

He has curated design exhibitions, such as Doing a Dyson (1996) and New Old (2017) at the Design Museum and Rewind: 40 Years of Design and Advertising (2002) at the Victoria and Albert Museum.

Myerson's work often explores the role of design in shaping the built environment and improving quality of life. He is an advocate for inclusive design.

== Selected publications ==
- Myerson, Jeremy; Ross, Philip James Nunes (2022). Unworking: the reinvention of the modern office. London: Reaktion books. ISBN 978-1-78914-668-4.
- Myerson, Jeremy (2021). Designing a world for everyone: 30 years of inclusive design. London, UK: Lund Humphries. ISBN 978-1-84822-463-6.
- Myerson, Jeremy; Design Museum (London, England), eds. (2017). New old: designing for our future selves. London: the Design Museum. ISBN 978-1-872005-55-3.
- Myerson, Jeremy; Bichard, Jo-Anne (2024). New Demographics New Workspace: Office Design for the Changing Workforce. Routledge. p. 164. ISBN 9781032838151.
- Myerson, Jeremy (2014). Life of Work: What Office Design Can Learn From the World Around Us. London: Black Dog Publishing. ISBN 978-1-908966-78-0.
- Myerson, Jeremy (2013). Gee, Emily; Royal College of Art (Great Britain) (eds.). Time & motion: redefining working life. Liverpool: Liverpool University Press. ISBN 978-1-84631-966-2.
- Myerson, Jeremy; Ross, Philip (2003). The 21st century office. London: Laurence King. ISBN 978-1-85669-394-3.
- Myerson, Jeremy (1999). IDEO Masters of Innovation. LAURENCE KING. p. 160. ISBN 978-1856694254.
- Myerson, Jeremy; Katz, Sylvia (1990). Lamps and Lighting. Conran Design Guides. Boston, MA: Springer. ISBN 978-1-4684-6661-4.
