= Michael Peters (designer) =

Michael Harold Berry Peters OBE (born in Luton, UK in 1941) is a designer. He has been in the design industry for more than 35 years. Peters has founded several design companies, including Michael Peters and Partners, Michael Peters Group PLC, and Identica.

== Education ==
After completing Luton Grammar School, Peters studied at the London School of Printing and Graphic Arts (now London College of Communication). Tom Eckersley, John Gillard, and Harry Beck, the creator of the London Underground plan, were among his teachers. After graduating he won a scholarship to Yale University's School of Art and Architecture in New Haven, Connecticut, where he studied under Paul Rand, Josef Albers, Norman Ives, Herbert Matter and Alexej Brodovitch. He acknowledges these teachers and the Bauhaus School as influences on his career. He graduated in 1963 with a master's degree.

== Career ==
=== Early years ===
After graduating from Yale, Peters worked under Lou Dorfsman and Teddy Andresakes on campaigns in advertising and design for CBS Television in New York. In 1965 he moved back to London and set up Cato Peters O’Brien. Within six months he moved to the Collett Dickenson Pearce advertising agency in London. While there, he received a Designer and Art Direction Silver Award. In 1968 Peters formed a partnership with Lou Klein, Klein Peters, which specialised mostly in packaging and point-of-sale material.

=== Michael Peters and Partners ===
In 1970, Peters set up his own design company, Michael Peters and Partners, which in 1988 had worldwide sales of $40 million. Clients included the BBC, Virgin, Martell, British Airways, Penhaligon, Abbey Life and Bird's Eye. Peters was an identity consultant to the Conservative Party, working with Margaret Thatcher. He did some packaging design in the marketing of consumer products. He helped found the Design Business Association and had roles in international design organisations. In 1985, he became one of the founders of the School of Communication Arts, run by his former teacher John Gillard.

Michael Peters and Partners was renamed Michael Peters Group and became a publicly quoted company in 1983. MPG opened offices in New York, Toronto, Los Angeles, Madrid, Milan, Düsseldorf, Helsinki and Tokyo, and acquired a number of businesses including Cockade Ltd. and, in 1989, Duffy Design Group, now Duffy & Partners. The staff included Howard Milton, Jay Smith, Glenn Tutsell and Madeleine Bennett.

In 1990, Michael Peters Group went bankrupt, in what was described by the Guardian as a "spectacularly messy collapse". The company was acquired by The Princedale Group.

=== Identica ===
In 1992 Peters set up a new business, Identica, a branding and design agency. The company worked for Universal Studios, Diageo and other international brands. Identica was acquired by Cossette Communications Group, a Canadian advertising and communication firm, in 2004.

== Awards and recognitions ==
Michael Peters won a D&AD Yellow Pencil in the 1960s. He received an OBE in June 1990 for services to design and marketing, and was nominated for the Prince Philip Designer's Prize in 2002.

A book about his career, Yes logo: 40 years of Michael Peters: branding, design and communication, was published in 2008.
