= Saffron Brand Consultants =

Brand consultancy

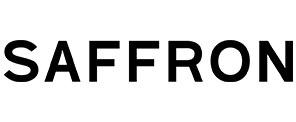
- Type: Independent
- Industry: Brand consultancy
- Founded: Madrid & London, 2001
- Founders: Jacob Benbunan, Wally Olins
- Headquarters: London, Madrid, Vienna, Istanbul
- Number of locations: 4
- Key people: Jacob Benbunan (CEO), Gabor Schreier, (Chief Creative Officer), Luz Erhardt, (Chief Client Officer), Charlotte Black, (Chief Strategy Officer), Santiago Canosa, (Chief Financial Officer)
- Number of employees: 100
- Website: saffron-consultants.com

Saffron Brand Consultants is an independent global brand consultancy. It was founded in 2001 by Jacob Benbunan and Wally Olins.

== Overview ==
Saffron has advised businesses and institutions all over the world on brand and strategy. Their clients come from a wide variety of sectors, from energy to telecommunications, retail to museums, Silicon Valley giants to European start-ups.

The company has offices in London, Madrid, Vienna, and Istanbul with strategic partners in New York and São Paulo. Saffron has clients all over the world, from San Francisco to London, from Moscow to Hong Kong.

== Clients ==
Some notable clients include YouTube, Siemens, Engie, Goldman Sachs, Santander, T-Mobile, Vueling, BBVA, Bankinter, Sodexo, Flying Tiger Copenhagen, Pacha, A1 Telekom Austria, C&A, Fujitsu, Volotea^{,} V Festival, Doha Film Institute, King's College London, The Institute of Cancer Research, Madrid Open and Turkcell, Vueling, Coca Cola, C&A^{,} Fujitsu, Raiffeisen Bank International, LVMH, Iberia, Lloyd's of London, Swiss Re.

Saffron has worked for a number of cities and countries on place brand strategy and identities including Vienna, the world’s most liveable city, and London, Northern Ireland, Turkey, Trinidad & Tobago and Poland. The company also works to define Employee Value Proposition for clients, notably Sodexo, one of the world’s largest employers.

Recent clients of Saffron include London’s Victoria and Albert Museum, Despegar – Latin America’s largest online travel agency, HK Express airline, Collinear, Gulf Air, Repsol and Bittensor.

== See also ==
- Sense Worldwide
