= Design and Art Direction =

British educational organisation

- Abbreviation: D&AD
- Formation: 1962; 64 years ago
- Legal status: Charity
- Headquarters: Spitalfields, London
- Region served: UK and worldwide
- Key people: Tim Lindsay (Chairman); David Patton (CEO); Nils Leonard (President)
- Website: dandad.org

Design and Art Direction (D&AD), formerly known as British Design and Art Direction, is a British educational organisation that was created in 1962 to promote excellence in design and advertising. Its main offices are in Spitalfields in London. It is most famous for its annual awards, the D&AD Pencils. The highest award given by D&AD, the Black Pencil, is not necessarily awarded every year.

== History ==
=== Origins (1962–1977) ===
D&AD was founded in 1962 by a group of London-based designers and art directors including David Bailey, Terence Donovan, Alan Fletcher, and Colin Forbes (who designed the original D&AD logo). A panel of 25 judged the 2500 entries to the first awards in 1963. They awarded one Black Pencil (to Geoffrey Jones Films) and 16 Yellow Pencils. Early winners received an ebony pencil box designed by Marcello Minale, one of the founding partners of Minale Tattersfield, which contained a pencil with silver lettering. In 1966 it was replaced by a more durable award. Its education programmes in their infancy, D&AD launched graphic workshops in association with the Royal College of Art in the mid-1960s. They ran until the mid-1970s. Designer Michael Wolff became the first elected president of D&AD in 1970. Six years later, then-president Alan Parker gave the first D&AD President’s Award for outstanding contribution to creativity to Colin Millward of Collett Dickenson Pearce.

=== Introduction of Student Awards (1978–1990) ===
D&AD education programmes continued to grow in 1978 when Dave Trott set up the D&AD Advertising Workshops. In 1979, initiated by Sir John Hegarty of Bartle Bogle Hegarty, the Student Awards were launched. Bridging the gap between college and work, the awards present students with real world briefs to tackle. The awards had already started to recognise a wider range of categories through the 1960s and 1970s and photography, retail design (now environmental design), music videos, and product design became part of the awards in the 1980s. The awards also opened up to international entries for the first time in 1988. Controversy surrounded a decision to hold separate advertising and design awards in 1986 and 1987; the separation, made for practical reasons based on the chosen venue, was seen by members as a split between industries. Afterward, the ceremony did come back under one roof, where it has remained.

=== Move to Graphite Square, Vauxhall (1990–2012) ===
D&AD moved to Graphite Square, in Vauxhall in the 1990s. The first Student Expo (now New Blood) and the University Network, the D&AD membership programme for university and college courses, launched in 1993. The first session of "Xchange" took place in 1996. It was described as a ‘summer school’ for college lecturers and creative practitioners updated participants on the latest industry trends. D&AD launched its website in 1996 and introduced its first digital categories to the awards in 1997. D&AD celebrated its 40th birthday in 2002 with Rewind, a retrospective exhibition and book of some of the most iconic work since the 1960s at the Victoria & Albert Museum.

A new benchmark was set at the turn of the century when a double Black Pencil was awarded to the AMV.BBDO ‘Surfer’ for Guinness for its visuals. This was matched five years later by ‘Grrr’, Wieden + Kennedy London's work for Honda UK. In 2006 another milestone was set as leoburnett.com won the first digital Black Pencil. Developments in the industry meant that two new categories were added in 2008, broadcast innovations and mobile marketing. That year, Apple Inc. won a Black Pencil for the iMac and the first-generation iPhone.

Design Workshops were relaunched in 2006 and D&AD North, its first regional network, in Manchester the same year. The Student Awards have become an increasingly international event. Entries in 2007 came from colleges in more than 40 countries. Italian design group Fabrica designed The annual outside the UK for the first time in 2007 and the showreel moved online that same year.

=== 50th year and beyond (2012–present) ===
In 2012, D&AD moved to a location on Hanbury Street. It celebrated its 50th anniversary in 2012 by honouring the most successful award-winners in its history with a special edition Taschen D&AD Annual featuring 50 different covers.

In 2017, D&AD moved to a new office and event space on Cheshire Street, London.

In October 2024, D&AD appointed its first US-based President, Kwame Taylor-Hayford.

== D&AD Pencil Awards ==
The following are the D&AD Pencil award levels:

- D&AD Wood Pencil: For best in advertising and design from the year
- D&AD Graphite Pencil: Awarded to stand-out work, well executed with an original idea at its core
- D&AD Yellow Pencil: Awarded only to the most outstanding work that achieves true creative excellence
- D&AD Black Pencil: For work that is ground-breaking in its field; not always awarded
- D&AD White Pencil: For exceptional and game-changing projects that have resulted in significant impact

== D&AD presidents ==
Each year the D&AD elects a president from the creative community. They are always D&AD Award winners.

Name	Category	Year
Edward Booth-Clibborn	Advertising	1963
Bob Gill	Design	1964
Derek Birdsall	Design	1965
Terence Conran	Design	1966
David Puttnam	Advertising	1967
Bob Brooks	Advertising	1968
Michael Peters	Design	1969
Brian Byfield	Advertising	1970
Michael Wolff	Design	1971
David Hillman	Design	1972
Chris Wilkins	Advertising	1973
Alfredo Marcantonio	Advertising	1974
David Abbott	Advertising	1975
Alan Parker	Advertising	1976
John Salmon	Advertising	1977
Gerry Moira	Advertising	1978
Andrew Cracknell	Advertising	1979
Lord Snowdon	Advertising	1980
Martin Boase	Advertising	1981
Marcello Minale	Design	1982
Tony Brignull	Advertising	1983
Rodney Fitch	Design	1984
Jeremy Myerson	Design	1985
John McConnell	Design	1986
Jeremy Sinclair	Advertising	1987
Gert Dumbar	Design	1988
John Hegarty	Advertising	1989
Ron Brown	Advertising	1990
Martin Lambie-Nairn	Design	1991
Tim Delaney	Advertising	1992
Aziz Cami	Design	1993
Adrian Holmes	Advertising	1994
Mary Lewis	Design	1995
Graham Fink	Advertising	1996
Mike Dempsey	Advertising	1997
Tim Mellors	Advertising	1998
Richard Seymour	Design	1999
Larry Barker	Advertising	2000
David Stuart	Design	2001
Peter Souter	Advertising	2002
Michael Johnson	Design	2003
Nick Bell	Design	2004
Dick Powell	Design	2005
Dave Trott	Advertising	2006
Tony Davidson	Advertising	2007
Simon Waterfall	Design	2008
Garrick Hamm	Design	2009
Paul Brazier	Advertising	2010
Simon Sankarayya	Design	2011
Rosie Arnold	Advertising	2012
Neville Brody	Design	2013
Laura Jordan-Bambach	Advertising	2014
Andy Sandoz	Advertising	2015
Bruce Duckworth	Design	2016
Steve Vranakis	Advertising	2017
Harriet Devoy	Design	2018
Kate Stanners	Advertising	2019
Naresh Ramchandani	Design	2020
Rebecca Wright	Education	2021
Richard Brim	Advertising	2022
Jack Renwick	Design	2023
Kwame Taylor-Hayford	Design	2024

== See also ==
- History of advertising in Britain
