= Dave Trott (advertising executive) =

British copywriter

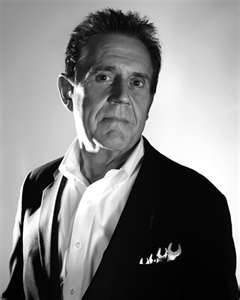
- Born: 1947 (age 77–78); Barking, Essex, England
- Occupation(s): Creative director, copywriter, author

Dave Trott is a creative director, copywriter, and author. Trott studied at the Pratt Institute in New York City, majoring in advertising before going on to found the advertising agencies Gold Greenlees Trott, Bainsfair Sharkey Trott and Walsh Trott Chick Smith. In 2004 he was given the D&AD President's Award for lifetime achievement in advertising.

== Career history ==
Dave Trott trained in New York at Carl Ally Inc. He then moved back to London in 1971 as a trainee copywriter at Boase Massimi Pollitt where his campaigns included Pepsi's "Lipsmackinthirstquenchin" and Courage's "Gercha" with John Webster. In 1980, Trott founded the advertising agency GGT with Mike Gold and Mike Greenlees. GGT was behind Toshiba's "Hello Tosh gotta Toshiba", Holsten Pils, Cadbury's Flake, Red Rock Cider, Cadbury's Creme Eggs, LWT posters, and Ariston's "Ariston-and-on-and-on". GGT was voted Agency of the Year by Campaign magazine, and Most Creative Agency in the World by Advertising Age magazine of New York.

In 1990 Trott left GGT and set up Bainsfair Sharkey Trott, which he left in 1993, He then set up WTCS with Amanda Walsh, Murray Chick, and Gordon Smith. This morphed into CST and in 2011 merged with The Gate London, Trott was the Chairman of The Gate until August 2014 when he left the agency.

In January 2017 he appeared on BBC Radio 4's The Museum of Curiosity. His hypothetical donation to this imaginary museum was a ploughman's lunch which "traditional" dish, as he noted, was invented in the 1960s as a marketing campaign for British cheese.

== Published works ==
In 2010 Trott wrote Creative Mischief, a book which detailed the things he had learned in his 40-year career in advertising. This was followed in 2013 by the release of his book Predatory Thinking: A Masterclass in Out-Thinking the Competition. In 2016, Trott's third book One + One = Three was released.
