= Tim Delaney =

Former American football wide receiver

Profile
- Positions: Tight end, wide receiver

Personal information
- Born: June 20, 1948 (age 78); Chino, California, U.S.
- Listed height: 5 ft 11 in (1.80 m)
- Listed weight: 185 lb (84 kg)

Career information
- High school: Chino (CA)
- College: Mt. San Antonio (1967); San Diego State (1968–1970)

Career history
- New York Giants (1971)*; St. Louis Cardinals (1973)*; The Hawaiians (1974–1975)
- * Offseason or practice squad member only

Awards and highlights
- WFL Receptins leader (1974); Set NCAA record with 6 receiving touchdowns (1969)

Tim Delaney (born June 20, 1948) is a former American football tight end and wide receiver. Delaney played college football for Mt. San Antonio College in 1967 and for the San Diego State Aztecs from 1968 to 1970. As a junior in 1970, he ranked among the national receiving leaders with 85 receptions (third), 1,259 receiving yards (fourth), and 14 receiving touchdowns (second). He also set an NCAA single-game record with six receiving touchdowns against New Mexico State in 1969. In 1970, he tallied 62 receptions for 794 yards and was selected as the team's most valuable player.

Delaney also played professional football, including preseason stints with the New York Giants in 1971 and with the St. Louis Cardinals in 1973.

Delaney played for The Hawaiians of the World Football League (WFL) in 1974 and 1975. Despite missing six quarters with a broken hand and playing with a cast upon his return, he led the WFL with 89 receptions in 1974. He also tallied 1,232 yards and eight touchdowns in 1974. In 1975, he caught 44 passes for 584 yards.

Delaney was inducted into the San Diego State Hall of Fame in 1990.
