= Ernst Volland =

German artist, photographer, cartoonist, gallerist and writer (b. 1946)

Ernst Volland (born 1946 in Bürgstadt/Miltenberg) is a German artist, photographer, cartoonist, gallerist, blogger, curator and writer living in Berlin. His main areas of endeavour are comics and comic photos; as well, he has published "fake art". His agency is named "Voller Ernst", an ironic term which may be translated as "total seriousness".

== Selected publications ==
- Plakate-Karikaturen. Atelier im Bauernhaus, Fischerhude 1977, ISBN 3-88132307-4.
- With Stefan Aust: Schöne Ansichten. Das Ernst Volland-Buch. Rasch und Röhring, Hamburg 1987, ISBN 3-89136-123-8.
- Felix ganz allein auf der Welt. Ravensburger, 1989.
- With Peter Huth: Dies Buch ist pure Fälschung. Von A bis Z: Alles Fälschung. Zweitausendeins, Frankfurt 1989.
- With Evgenij A. Chaldej (Hrsg.): Von Moskau nach Berlin – Bilder des russischen Fotografen Jewgeni Chaldej. Nicolai, Berlin 1994.
- Gott und andere Götter. With einem Fake auf der Suche nach Gott. Verlag M, Berlin 2008, ISBN 978-3-9812257-1-6.
- Das Banner des Sieges. Story, Berlin 2008, ISBN 978-3-929829-91-4.
- Heinrich-Böll-Stiftung (Hrsg.): Eingebrannte Bilder. Katalog. 2009, ISBN 978-3-86928-004-2.
- Nachwort in: Manfred Günther Wörterbuch Jugend – Alter. Berlin 2010.
- Genussvoll verzichten. Buch, Verlag Büchse Der Pandora 2013, ISBN 978-3-88178-366-8.
- With David King: John Heartfield: Laughter is a Devastating Weapon. Tate Publishing 2015, ISBN 978-1849761840
- Stories. Berlin 2016
