= Collett Dickenson Pearce =

British advertising agency (1960–2000)

Collett Dickenson Pearce & Partners
- Surreal Benson & Hedges poster at Victoria Station, London, c.1978
- Industry: Advertising
- Founded: 1960
- Founders: John Pearce, Ronnie Dickenson
- Defunct: 2000

Collett Dickenson Pearce & Partners (CDP) was a British advertising agency which operated from 1960 till 2000. It was founded by John Pearce and Ronnie Dickenson who bought an existing agency owned by John Collett. The agency played a pivotal role in London's cultural shift of the 1960s and was a nursery for a number British creative entrepreneurs who would later enjoy famed careers.

== History and reputation ==
The agency was founded on 1 April 1960. That month, Pearce left the agency Colman Prentis Varley and with Dickenson bought Pictorial Publicity, an existing agency owned by John Collett. Their first account wins were Ford and Birds Eye

CDP emerged from the "Swinging London" cultural shifts of the 1960s as Britain's most glamorous and influential advertising agency, generally regarded as one of the finest advertising agencies in the world during the 1970s.

The agency's output had a distinctive sharp wit and confident font-led graphic style, well suited to the voguish "colour supplements" which the Sunday newspapers were launching at this time. By the 70s, colour television with improved picture definition was rapidly taking root, bringing the need and the opportunity for greater sophistication in the commercials it showed. CDP plunged in under its new managing director Frank Lowe (later Sir Frank), and set the tone for what is now viewed as a golden creative period in British advertising. Clients included Harvey’s Bristol Cream, Bird’s Eye, Parker pens, Fiat, Ford, Acrilan, Pretty Polly, and Ronson. Campaign slogans which entered the national consciousness include "Happiness is a cigar called Hamlet" and "Land Rover. The best 4 x 4 x far." "Heineken refreshes the parts other beers cannot reach" (1974). (1979) Heineken Galley Slave commercial. These, and commercials for Hovis (by Ridley Scott, 1973) and Cinzano (Alan Parker, 1978), all appear in the upper reaches of 100 Greatest TV Ads.

The agency's most notorious campaign was for Benson & Hedges cigarettes – carried principally on posters and in print, because cigarette advertising had been banned from British television since 1965. To circumvent restrictions on associating smoking with youth, glamour or life style, CDP devised a memorable series of images placing the product's gold pack in highly contrived, surreal surroundings. No people were shown, and not a word of copy, apart from the obligatory Government health warnings.

After years of dwindling fortune in the late 1980s and through the 1990s, Collett Dickenson Pearce ceased business in 2000. The company was acquired by the Dentsu group, the fifth largest global marketing communications group, which then incorporated the famous name into an existing agency Travis Sully, which was renamed CDP-Travissully London.

In 2010, adman Jim Kelly, a founder of Rainey Kelly Campbell Roalfe /Y&R, was given the task of expanding Dentsu’s fledgling European network. Part of his strategy was a new management team and a complete agency rebrand for CDP-Travissully, replacing the CDP name with "Dentsu London".

== Famous alumni ==
CDP was a "nursery" for the careers of many who were to become internationally famous. Among those working there as young men were Frank Lowe, David Puttnam, Alan Parker, John Hegarty, Charles Saatchi, and Bob Isherwood. Sir Ridley Scott, the director of Blade Runner, Alien and Gladiator, made commercials for CDP, as did Chariots of Fire director Hugh Hudson. In the 1980s Tony Kaye started his career there as an art director, before he began directing television commercials.

The creative director during the first two key decades was the late Colin Millward, a dour veteran of World War II. John Salmon was creative director and chairman.

Puttnam's role was as an account executive. "My equivalent of university was the five years [1962-1967] I spent working at an advertising agency called Collett Dickenson Pearce ... with good reason I believed I was working for the best agency in the world. Most of the work we were doing was both different and good; and we were winning awards and gaining recognition left, right and centre."
