= Inclusive design =

Design process

Inclusive design is a design process in which a product, service, or environment is designed to be usable for as many people as possible, particularly groups who are traditionally excluded from being able to use an interface or navigate an environment. Its focus is on fulfilling as many user needs as possible, not just as many users as possible. Historically, inclusive design has been linked to designing for people with physical disabilities, and accessibility is one of the key outcomes of inclusive design. However, rather than focusing on designing for disabilities, inclusive design is a methodology that considers many aspects of human diversity that could affect a person's ability to use a product, service, or environment, such as ability, language, culture, gender, and age. The Inclusive Design Research Center reframes disability as a mismatch between the needs of a user and the design of a product or system, emphasizing that disability can be experienced by any user. With this framing, it becomes clear that inclusive design is not limited to interfaces or technologies, but may also be applied to the design of policies and infrastructure.

Three dimensions in inclusive design methodology identified by the Inclusive Design Research Centre include:

1. Recognize, respect, and design with human uniqueness and variability.
2. Use inclusive, open, and transparent processes, and co-design with people who represent a diversity of perspectives.
3. Realize that you are designing in a complex adaptive system, where changes in a design will influence the larger systems that utilize it.

Further iterations of inclusive design include product inclusion, a practice of bringing an inclusive lens throughout development and design. This term suggests looking at multiple dimensions of identity including race, age, gender and more.

== History ==
In the 1950s, Europe, Japan, and the United States began to move towards "barrier-free design", which sought to remove obstacles in built environments for people with physical disabilities. By the 1970s, the emergence of accessible design began to move past the idea of building solutions specifically for individuals with disabilities towards normalization and integration. In 1973, the United States passed the Rehabilitation Act, which prohibits discrimination on the basis of disability in programs conducted by federal agencies, a crucial step towards recognizing that accessible design was a condition for supporting people's civil rights. In May 1974, the magazine Industrial Design published an article, "The Handicapped Majority," which argued that handicaps were not a niche concern and 'normal' users suffered from poor design of products and environments as well.

Clarkson and Coleman describe the emergence of inclusive design in the United Kingdom as a synthesis of existing projects and movement. Coleman also published the first reference to the term in 1994 with The Case for Inclusive Design, a presentation at the 12th Triennial Congress of the International Ergonomics Association. Much of this early work was inspired by an aging population and people living for longer times in older ages as voiced by scholars like Peter Laslett. Public focus on accessibility further increased with the passage of the passage of the Americans with Disabilities Act of 1990, which expanded the responsibility of accessible design to include both public and private entities.

In the 1990s, the United States followed the United Kingdom in shifting focus from universal design to inclusive design. Around this time, Selwyn Goldsmith (in the UK) and Ronald 'Ron' Mace (in the US), two architects who had both survived polio and were wheelchair users, advocated for an expanded view of design for everyone. Along with Mace, nine other authors from five organizations in the United States developed the Principles of Universal Design in 1997. In 1998, the United States amended Section 508 of the Rehabilitation Act to include inclusivity requirements for the design of information and technology.

In 2016, the Design for All Showcase at the White House featured a panel on inclusive design. The show featured clothing and personal devices either on the market or in development, modeled by disabled people. Rather than treating accessible and inclusive design as a product of compliance to legal requirements, the showcase positioned disability as a source of innovation.

== Related concepts and terms ==
Inclusive design is often equated to accessible or universal design, as all three concepts are related to ensuring that products are usable by all people.

=== Accessibility ===
Accessibility is oriented towards the outcome of ensuring that a product supports individual users' needs. Accessible design is often based upon compliance with government- or industry-designated guidelines, such as Americans with Disabilities Act (ADA) Accessibility Standards or Web Content Accessibility Guidelines (WCAG). As a result, it is limited in scope and often focuses on specific accommodations to ensure that people with disabilities have access to products, services, or environments. In contrast, inclusive design considers the needs of a wider range of potential users, including those with capability impairments that may not be legally recognized as disabilities. Inclusive design seeks out cases of exclusion from a product or environment, regardless of the cause, and seeks to reduce that exclusion. For example, a design that aims to reduce safety risks for people suffering from age-related long-sightedness would be best characterized as an inclusive design. Inclusive design also looks beyond resolving issues of access to improving the overall user experience.

As a result, accessibility is one piece of inclusive design, but not the whole picture. In general, designs created through an inclusive design process should be accessible, as the needs of people with different abilities are considered during the design process. But accessible designs aren't necessarily inclusive if they don't move beyond providing access to people of different abilities and consider the wider user experience for different types of people—particularly those who may not suffer from recognized, common cognitive, or physical disabilities.

=== Universal design ===
Universal design is design for everyone: the term was coined by Ronald Mace in 1980, and its aim is to produce designs that all people can use fully, without the need for adaptations. Universal design originated in work on the design of built environments, though its focus has expanded to encompass digital products and services as well.

Universal design principles include usefulness to people with diverse abilities; intuitive use regardless of user's skill level; perceptible communication of necessary information; tolerance for error; low physical effort; and appropriate size and space for all users. Many of these principles are compatible with accessible and inclusive design, but universal design typically provides a single solution for a large user base, without added accommodations. Therefore, while universal design supports the widest range of users, it does not aim to address individual accessibility needs. Inclusive design acknowledges that it is not always possible for one product to meet every user's needs, and thus explores different solutions for different groups of people.

=== Design justice ===
"Design justice" is a term coined to describe designing systems based on historical inequalities. As articulated by the Design Justice Network, it aims to "rethink design processes, center individuals who are typically marginalized by design, and employ collaborative, creative practices to tackle the most pressing challenges faced by communities." By emphasizing the viewpoints of those historically excluded from design decisions, Design Justice seeks to redistribute power and promote inclusivity within systems, environments, and products.

== Approaches to inclusive design ==
In general, inclusive design involves engaging with users and seeking to understand their needs. Frequently, inclusive design approaches include steps such as: developing empathy for the needs and contexts of potential users; forming diverse teams; creating and testing multiple solutions; encouraging dialogue regarding a design rather than debate; and using structured processes that guide conversations toward productive outcomes.

=== Principles of Universal Design (1997) ===
Five United States organizations—including the Institute for Human Centered Design (IHCD) and Ronald Mace at North Carolina State University—developed the Principles of Universal Design in 1997. The IHCD has since shifted the language of the principles from 'universal' to 'inclusive.'

1. Equitable Use: Any group of users can use the design.
2. Flexibility in Use: A wide range of preferences and abilities is accommodated.
3. Simple, Intuitive Use: Regardless of the user's prior experience or knowledge, the use of the design is easy to understand.
4. Perceptible Information: Any necessary information is communicated to the user, regardless of environment or user abilities.
5. Tolerance for Error: Any adverse or hazardous consequences of actions is minimized.
6. Low Physical Effort: The design can be used efficiently and comfortably.
7. Size and Space for Approach & Use: Regardless of the user's body size, posture, or mobility, there is appropriate size and space to approach and use the design.

=== UK Commission for Architecture and Built Environment (2006) ===
The Commission for Architecture and the Built Environment (CABE) is an arm of the UK Design Council, which advises the government on architecture, urban design and public space. In 2006, they created the following set of inclusive design principles:

1. Inclusive: Everyone can use it safely, easily, and with dignity.
2. Responsive: Takes account of what people say they need and want.
3. Flexible: Different people can use it differently.
4. Convenient: Usable without too much effort.
5. Accommodating: For all people, regardless of age, gender, mobility, ethnicity, or circumstances.
6. Welcoming: No disabling barriers that might exclude some people.
7. Realistic: More than one solution to address differing needs.
8. Understandable: Everyone can locate and access it.

=== Inclusive Design Toolkit ===
The University of Cambridge's Inclusive Design Toolkit advocates incorporating inclusive design elements throughout the design process in iterative cycles of:

1. Exploring the needs
2. Creating solutions
3. Evaluating how well the needs are met

=== Corporate inclusive design approaches ===
Microsoft emphasizes the role of learning from people who represent different perspectives in their inclusive design approach. They advocate for the following steps:

1. Recognize exclusion: Open up products and services to more people.
2. Solve for one, extend to many: Designing for people with disabilities tends to result in designs that benefit other user groups as well.
3. Learn from diversity: Center people from the start of the design process, and develop insight from their perspectives.

At Adobe, the inclusive design process begins with identification of situations where people are excluded from using a product. They describe the following principles of inclusive design:

1. Identify ability-based exclusion: Proactively understand how and why people are excluded.
2. Identify situational challenges: These are specific scenarios where a user is unable to use a product effectively, such as when an environmental circumstance makes it difficult to use a design. For example, if a video does not include closed-captioning, it may be difficult to understand the audio in a noisy environment.
3. Avoid personal biases: Involve people from different communities throughout the design process.
4. Offer various ways to engage: When a user is given different options, they can choose a method that serves them best.
5. Provide equivalent experiences to all users: When designing different ways for people to engage with your product, ensure that the quality of these experiences is comparable for each user.

Google's, the inclusive design process is called product inclusion, and looks at 13 dimensions of identity and the intersections of those dimensions throughout the product development and design process.

=== Participatory design ===
Participatory design is rooted in the design of Scandinavian workplaces in the 1970s, and is based in the idea that those affected by a design should be consulted during the design process. Designers anticipate how users will actually use a product—and rather than focusing on merely designing a useful product, the whole infrastructure is considered: the goal is to design a good environment for the product at use time. This methodology treats the challenge of design as an ongoing process. Further, rather than viewing the design process in phases, such as analysis, design, construction, and implementation, the participatory design approach looks at projects in terms of a collection of users and their experiences.

== Examples of inclusive design ==
There are numerous examples of inclusive design that apply to interfaces and technology, consumer products, and infrastructure.

=== Interfaces and technology ===
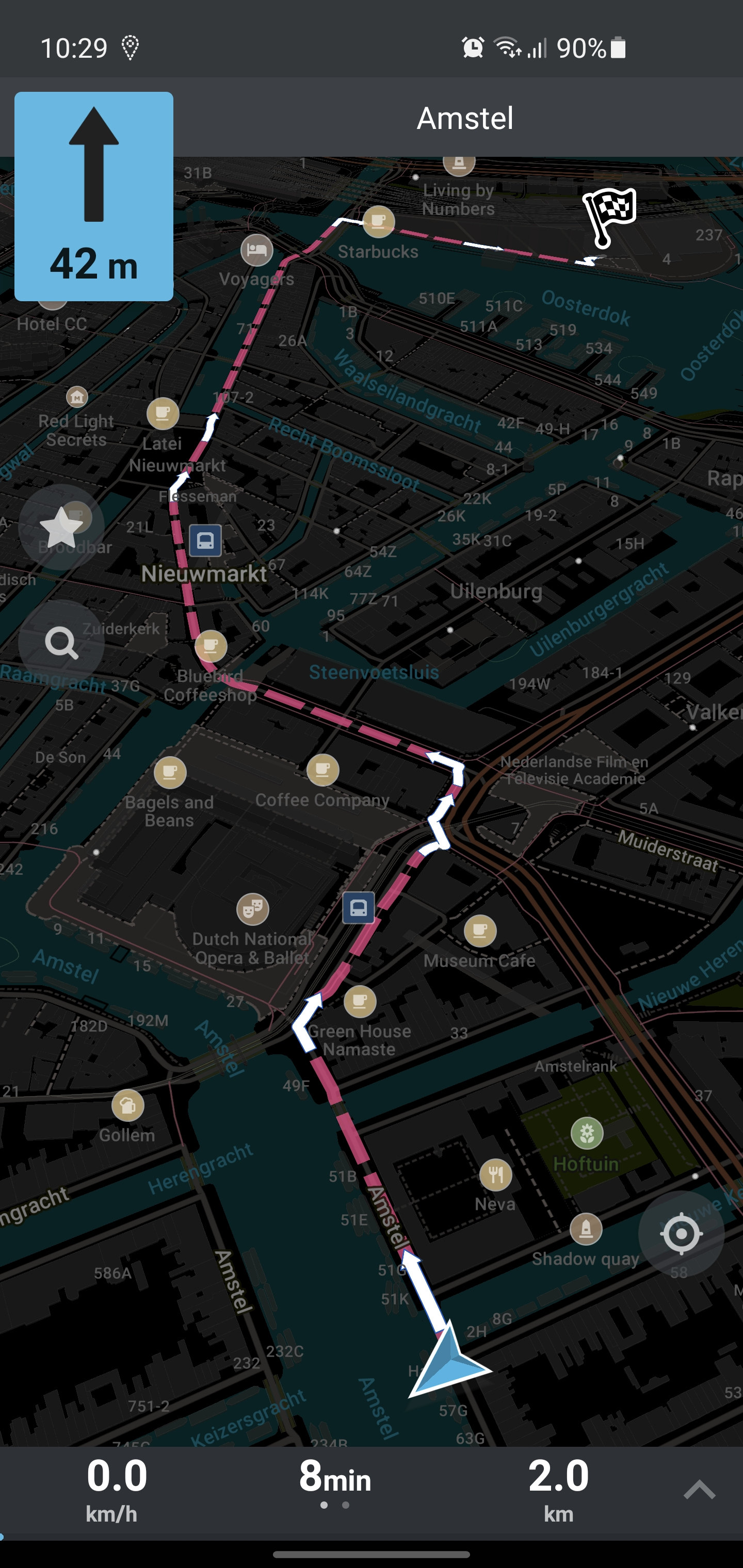
Senior users may have cataracts or cloudy ocular media, vision issues that make it difficult to process interfaces in light mode. Implementing a dark mode option can support the needs of these users.

- Text legibility for older users: To ensure legibility of text for users of all ages, designers must use "reasonably large font sizes, have high contrast between characters in the foreground and background, and use a clean typeface." These design elements are beneficial to all users of an interface, but they are implemented to address the needs of senior users in particular. Other inclusive design solutions include adding buttons that allow users to adjust the font size of a website to their liking, or giving users the option to switch to a "dark mode" that is easier on the eyes for some users.
- Assistive clothing: Individuals with physical disabilities may experience difficulties with dressing or undressing. In recent years, inclusive design practices have been implemented in the fashion industry by brands including Kohl's, Nike, Target, Tommy Hilfiger, and Zappos. Such adaptive clothing products can take the form of magnets or velcro on the side of pants, zippers on the sleeves of tops to become detachable, and natural fibers to ensure breathability, temperature control, and overall comfort.

=== Consumer products ===
- The ROPP Closure: Because most elderly and disabled people do not have the necessary strength to open packaging, a project was conducted that centered on modifying the packaging for plastic and glass containers. The roll-on pilfer-proof (ROPP) closure, a design used to seal spirit bottles, was used as a model in the project to determine the capable strength of consumers and the physical strength required to open the glass and plastic containers while also keeping the container properly sealed. If the strength limits of consumers and the design limits of the ROPP closure are solved, the majority of the public will be able to open a container, and the containers will be fully closed.

=== Infrastructure ===
- Playgrounds/parks in urban areas: Children are often excluded from accessible public places in cities due to safety concerns, so spatial planners design playgrounds and parks within cities in order to give children the opportunity to freely examine their curiosities. These areas are significant for a child's growth because children can socialize with each other, explore their surroundings, and stay physically active without worrying about any common dangers that can occur in an urban environment.
- Musholm: Musholm is a sports center located in Denmark which contains a 110 meter-long activity ramp with landings and recreational zones, where wheelchair users can engage in activities such as a climbing wall and a cable lift. The initial objective for the designers of this building was making sure that the facilities were accessible to everyone.
- The Friendship Park: Located in Uruguay, this park was built so that it can be easily accessible for every child, especially children with disabilities. The park has swings available for children in wheelchairs, wide walkways, curved corners instead of sharp edges, and flooring that is cushioned and slip resistant. These features were added in order "to not only make the space safe, but to also make the space easy to use."
- Tactile Pavement in Urban Area: Visually impaired individuals may have hard time navigating their surroundings. Implementing tactile pavement with different but identifiable textures allows them to understand what is ahead. Some indicators includes blister paving patterns, where it locates around crosswalks to indicate road crossing ahead, cycleway tactile paving that help alert people of cyclist path, where the pavements has lined tile along the path for the cyclist and directional tactile paving that help indicate the direction of the sidewalks when there are no other indicators on the street.

== See also ==
- Empathic design
- Feminist design
- Game accessibility
- Human-centered design
- Neuroinclusive design
- Right to mobility
- Transgenerational design
- Universal design
