= John Salmon (advertising executive) =

British advertising executive

John "Smokey" Salmon
- John "Smokey" Salmon
- Born: John Michael Salmon; 18 January 1931; Highgate, London, England
- Died: 7 April 2017 (aged 86)
- Occupation: Advertising executive
- Known for: Creative director and later chairman, Collett Dickenson Pearce
- Spouse: Suzanne Jouvray (m.1953)
- Parent(s): Thomas and Amelia Rose Salmon

John Michael Salmon, known as "Smokey" Salmon, (18 January 1931 – 7 April 2017) was an advertising executive who was known for his role at Collett Dickenson Pearce (CDP) and for "firing" the Ford Motor Company as a client after their public relations department attempted to interfere with his agency's creative process.

== Early life ==
John Salmon was born in Highgate, London, on 18 January 1931 to Thomas and Amelia Rose Salmon. In 1953 he married a Frenchwoman, Suzanne Jouvray, who later became a painter.

== Career ==
After service in the Royal Air Force, where Salmon became close friends with the writer Len Deighton, he worked as a typographer and copywriter in advertising. He got a job at the American agency Doyle Dane Bernbach and in 1967 at Collett Dickenson Pearce (now Dentsu) in London where he rose from copywriter to creative director and later chairman, being known as "Smokey" Salmon. The agency has been described by Mark Whelan as being, in its heyday, "Mad Men personified".

At CDP, Salmon worked with Charles Saatchi and Alan Parker. He mentored Alan Waldie who developed the Benson & Hedges "Gold" cigarette campaign. He recruited Omar Sharif to appear in advertising for Olympus cameras and Alan Whicker to promote Barclaycard. He developed memorable print advertising for the British Army and the Metropolitan Police. He "fired" the Ford Motor Company after their PR department attempted to interfere with his agency's creative process. When Frank Lowe, later Sir Frank Lowe, left CDP to form Lowe Howard-Spink, Salmon declined an invitation to join them. He was described by Lowe as "one of the three greatest copywriters of the late 20th century" along with Tony Brignull and David Abbott. Jim Aitchison has written that as creative director of CDP, Salmon "presided over that agency's golden years of creativity".

== Later life ==
After retirement in 1994, Salmon studied art history and obtained two degrees from the Open University. He and Suzanne indulged their interest in contemporary art and cookery. Salmon was an enthusiastic follower of American baseball. He died on 7 April 2017 and was survived by his wife and three children.

== Selected publications ==
- CDP: Inside Collett Dickenson Pearce. Batsford, London, 2001. (With John Ritchie) ISBN 978-0713484038

== See also ==
- Mad Men
