= Robin Fior =

English designer (1935–2012)

- Born: 27 January 1935; London
- Died: 29 September 2012 (aged 77)

Robin A. Fior (27 January 1935 – 29 September 2012) was a British designer closely associated with radical and libertarian causes in the 1960s and 70s.

Born in London into a Jewish family, Fior was the son of solicitor Lucien Fior and Olga Samuel. He learned typesetting as a public schoolboy at Harrow. As a designer and typographer, he was self-taught, learning on the job and from colleagues and printers. His single year as an undergraduate in the English department at Oxford was spent mostly in bookshops. But he developed an interest in language and politics that marked his entire professional and social life.
