= Wolff Olins =

Branding consultancy

- Type: Subsidiary
- Industry: Brand design consulting
- Founded: 1965; 61 years ago in London, United Kingdom
- Founders: James Main; Michael Wolff; Wally Olins
- Headquarters: London; New York City; San Francisco
- Key people: Sairah Ashman (global chief executive); Michael Khoury (president, North America)
- Number of employees: 150
- Parent: Omnicom Group
- Website: wolffolins.com

Wolff Olins is a global brand consultancy agency that specialises in corporate identity. It was founded in 1965 in London, where its main office is still based, as well as having offices in New York City, San Francisco and Los Angeles. It employs some 150 designers, strategists, technologists, environment specialists and programme managers, and has been part of the Omnicom Group since 2001. Since the agency was founded, it has worked for entities in sectors including technology, culture, retail, sport, consumer goods, travel, energy and public utilities, media and non-profit.

In 2012 the firm was listed by The Sunday Times as one of the "best small companies to work for", and was 31st of the "best places to work" compiled by Ad Age magazine. In 2018 Fast Company magazine placed the company at the head of a list of the "most innovative design firms".

== History ==
Wolff Olins was founded in Camden Town, London, in 1965 by designer Michael Wolff and advertising executive Wally Olins. Wolff left the business in 1983, and Olins in 2001; Wolff is still active in the field of branding, and Olins died on 2014. Wolff Olins has offices in London, New York City, Los Angeles and San Francisco.

In 2002, Wolff Olins was selected by the British Library as a subject of their National Life Stories oral history project.

In 2012, designs for Orange and the London Olympics were included in a retrospective examining design from 1948 to 2012 at the V&A in London.

In 2017, Sairah Ashman became the first female CEO of Wolff Olins.

== Work ==
From 1965 to the early 1990s, Wolff Olins developed corporate identities for various large European companies. During this time Olins published The Corporate Personality (1978) and Corporate Identity (1989). Olins defined corporate identity as "strategy made visible", and the firm worked with companies including BOC (1967), The Beatles' Apple Records (1968), Bovis (1971), Volkswagen's VAG (1978), 3i (1983), Prudential (1986) and BT (1991).

During the 1990s, Wolff Olins focused more on corporate branding. The company's work during that time included First Direct (1989), Orange (1994), Diageo and Odeon (1997), Heathrow Express (1998), Tata Group (2000), Unilever flower U logo (2004), the NBCUniversal logo (2011), and the BBC Reith blocks logo (2021).

The logo for the 2012 Olympic Games, designed by the agency in 2007, was included in Extraordinary Stories about Ordinary Things, an exhibition in 2012 at The Design Museum in London.

== Criticism ==
Some of Wolff Olins' work has received controversial reception. Its piper design for BT in 1991 attracted a great deal of opposition. The company was also responsible for the short-lived $110m (£75m) re-branding of PwC Consulting to Monday in 2002. The launch of the London 2012 brand in 2007 was met with widespread public derision. Design critic Stephen Bayley condemned the London 2012 Olympic Games logo as "a puerile mess, an artistic flop and a commercial scandal".

In July 2021, Wolff Olins designed a rebranding for the then largest active asset manager in the UK, Standard Life Aberdeen plc, to change its name to Abrdn. Although pronounced Aberdeen, this vowelless name was met with widespread ridicule and was the butt of many online jokes. An online poll of investors described the rebrand as an "act of corporate insanity". In 2025, Abrdn reverted its name back to Aberdeen.
