= Masahiro Mori (designer) =

Japanese ceramic designer

- Born: November 14, 1927; Saga Prefecture, Japan
- Died: November 12, 2005 (aged 77); Nagasaki Prefecture, Japan
- Education: Tama Art University
- Occupations: Industrial Designer (Ceramic), Professor
- Awards: 1960 The 1st Good Design Award "G-type Soysauce Bottle"; 1983 The 13th Mainichi Industrial Design Award; 1983 The 13th International industrial design exhibition in Valencia, Spain, Grand Prix in the Ceramic Division <Shell Bowls>
- Website: www.morimasahiro-ds.org

Masahiro Mori (森 正洋, Mori Masahiro; November 14, 1927 – November 12, 2005) was a Japanese ceramic designer born in Saga Prefecture, Japan. The well known "G-type Soy Sauce Bottle" he designed in 1958 won the 1st Good Design Award in 1960 and its production and sales have continued until today (as of December 11, 2011). He won the Good Design Award more than 110 times in his life. In describing his design philosophy, he stated, "My pleasure as a designer is to conceive of forms for daily use, and to create pieces for production in the factory, so that many people can appreciate and enjoy using them". He worked to design ceramic dishes suitable for the Japanese lifestyle in post-World War II.

== Biography ==
- 14 November 1927 Born in Shiota-cho Fujitsu-gun, Saga prefecture (Currently Shiota-cho Ureshino-shi, Saga prefecture)
- Apr, 1941 Saga Prefectural Arita Institute of Technology (Currently Saga Prefectural Arita Technical High School) Design department (till Mar, 1945)
- Jan, 1946 Studied under the potter Haizan Matsumoto (〜1947)
- Apr, 1948 Studied at Department of craft and design, Tama College of Art and Design (Currently Tama Art University) (till Mar, 1952)
- Jun, 1949 Worked as a research student at the 2nd design office, craft guidance office, Ministry of Commerce (till 1951)
- Apr, 1952 Worked at the editorial department of Gakken Co., Ltd. (till 1953)
- Jan, 1954 Worked at the design office, Ceramic technology guidance office in Nagasaki (Currently Ceramic Research Center of Nagasaki) (till 1956)
- Jul, 1956 Worked for Hakusan porcelain co., ltd. Worked at the design office set up some time later (till Mar, 1978)
- Oct, 1958 Participated in the workshop by Kaj Franck(Finnish designer) Industry and crafts guidance office, Ministry of Commerce invited (Tokyo)
- Oct, 1961 Went over the design in Europe and the United States. Met Isamu Noguchi at Genichiro Inokuma's home in United States. Visited Kaj Franck in Finland. (till Nov, 1961)
- 1965 A member of Japan Design Committee (till November 12, 2005)
- Apr, 1974 Professor, Faculty of Fine Arts in Kyushu Sangyo University (till 1982)
- 1976 A member of the nominating committee for Mainichi Design Prize (till 1995)
- Mar, 1978 Quit Hakusan porcelain co., ltd.
- Apr, 1978 Established Mori Masahiro Industrial Design Laboratory
- Sep, 1978 Panelist of the session meeting, the 8th World Craft Conference in Kyoto
- 1979 A member of the International Academy of Ceramics (till November 12, 2005)
- Apr, 1985 Guest professor at the Ceramics Division in the Department of Design and Craft, Aichi Prefectural University of Fine Arts and Music (till 1989)
- Apr, 1989 Professor at the Ceramics Division in the Department of Design and Craft, Aichi Prefectural University of Fine Arts and Music (till 1993)
- Jun, 1992 Lectured titled "Farms of Nature and Life" at University of Art and Design Helsinki in Finland. Symposium "Interaction in ceramics : art, design and research"
- 1989 The exploratory committee for Ceramics Park (Hasami, Nagasaki) was established. Took care of Ceramic art wall "Ceramic Road (Toji no michi)", the symbol mark of the park and the design of facilities such as lounge. Directed the restoration of 12 "Kilns in the world" at the open-air museum. (till 1996)
- Apr, 1999 Guest professor, Aichi Prefectural University of Fine Arts and Music (till 2005)
- 2004 Won the Masaru Katsumi Award
- November 12, 2005 Died at a hospital in Sasebo, Nagasaki

== Works ==
=== In the 1950s ===
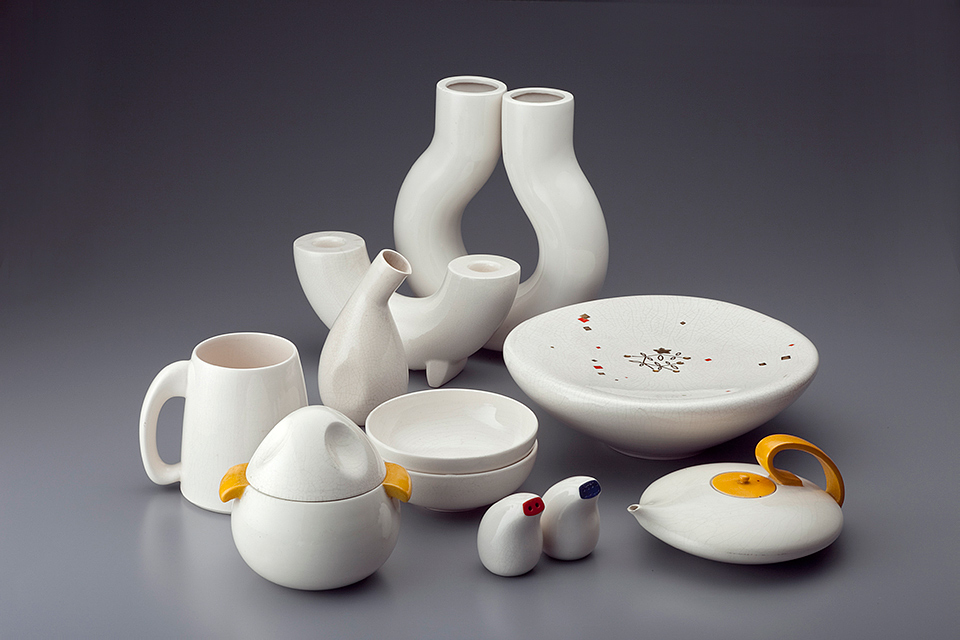
Trial Piece by GOTO White Clay (1955)

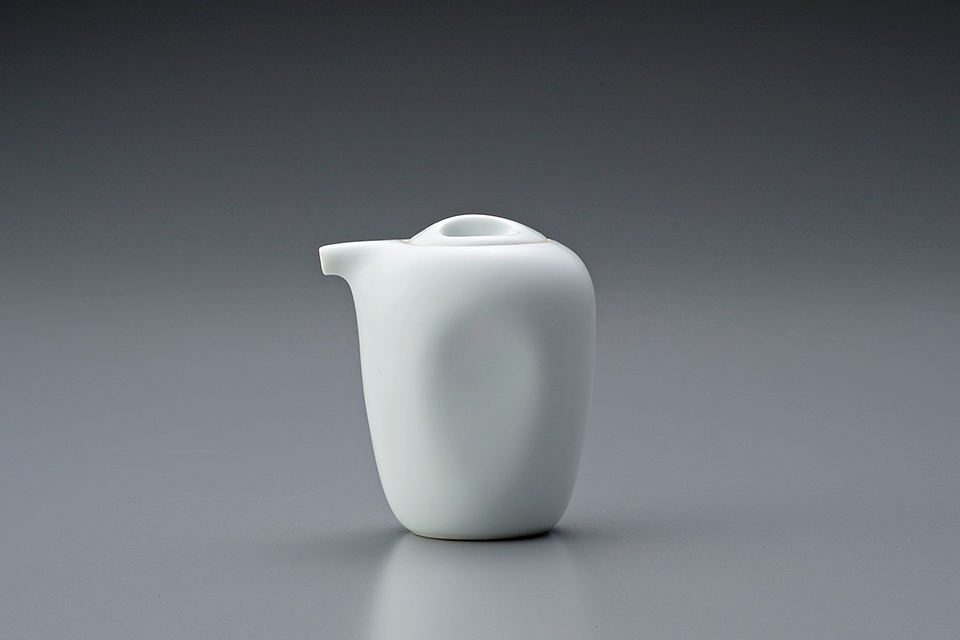
Trial Piece by GOTO White Clay / Soy Sauce Bottle (1955)

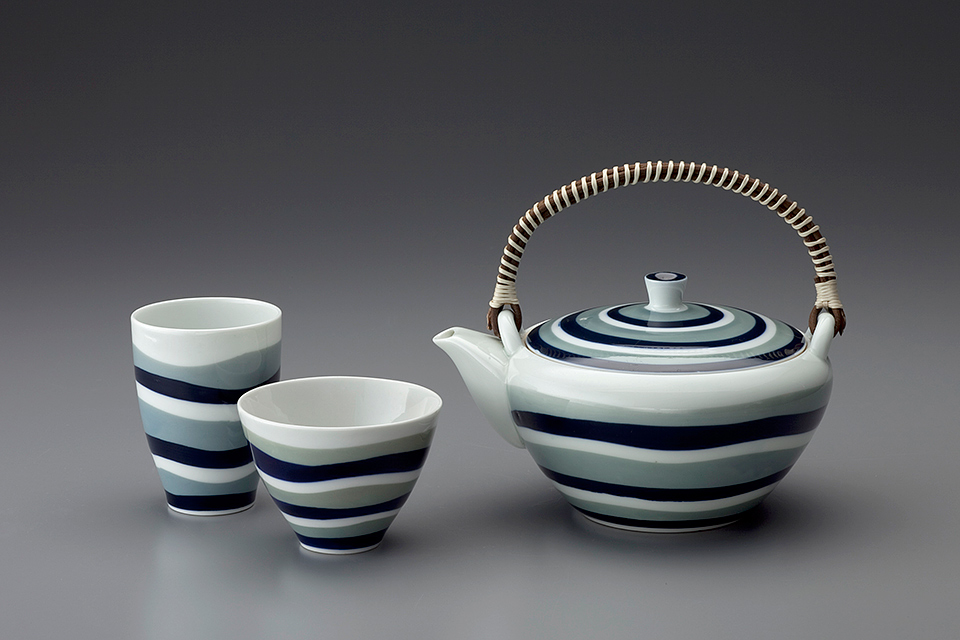
Tea Set (1957)

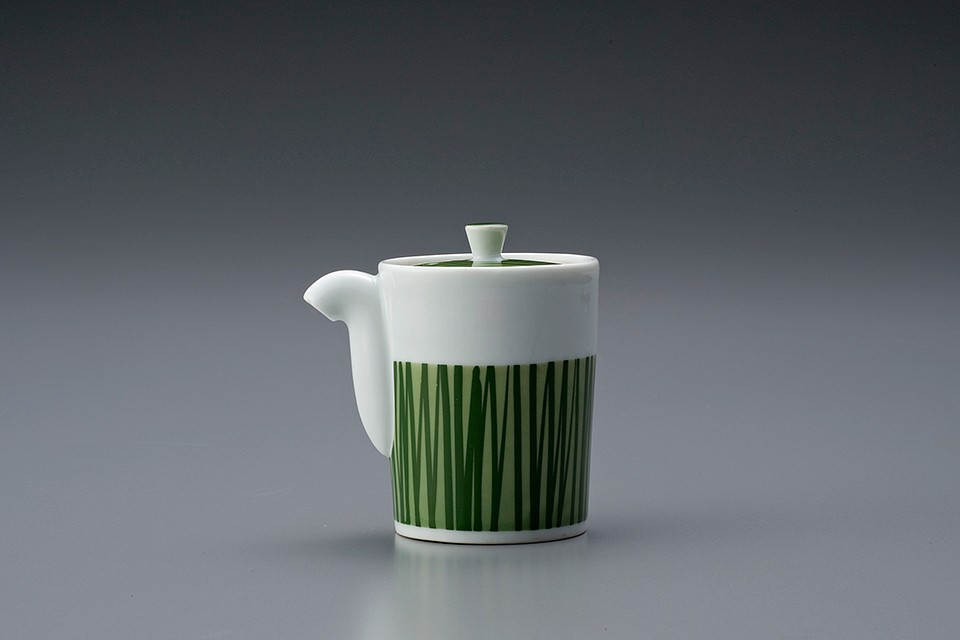
Soy Sauce Bottle (1957)

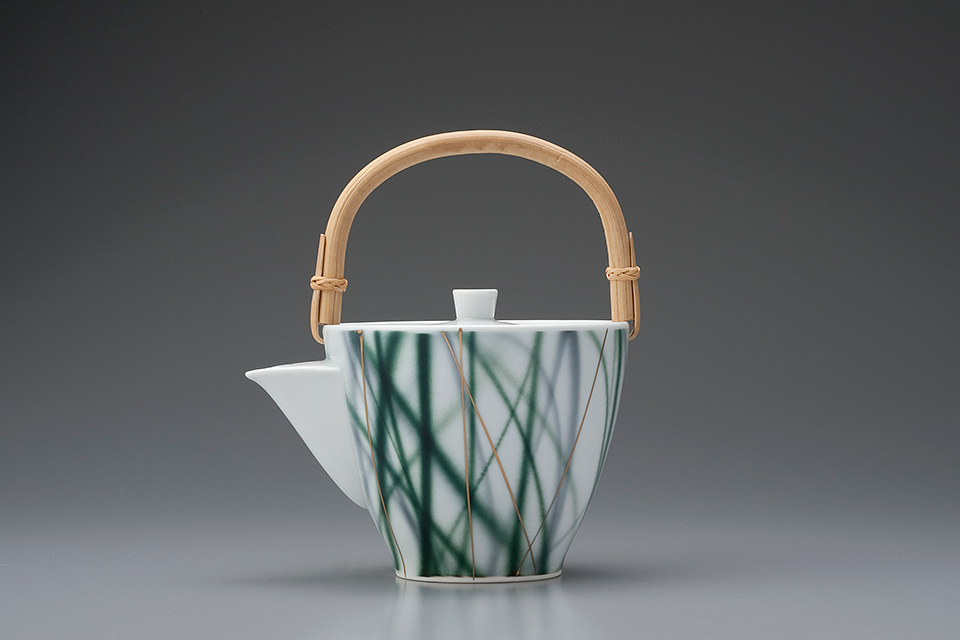
Tea Pot (1957)

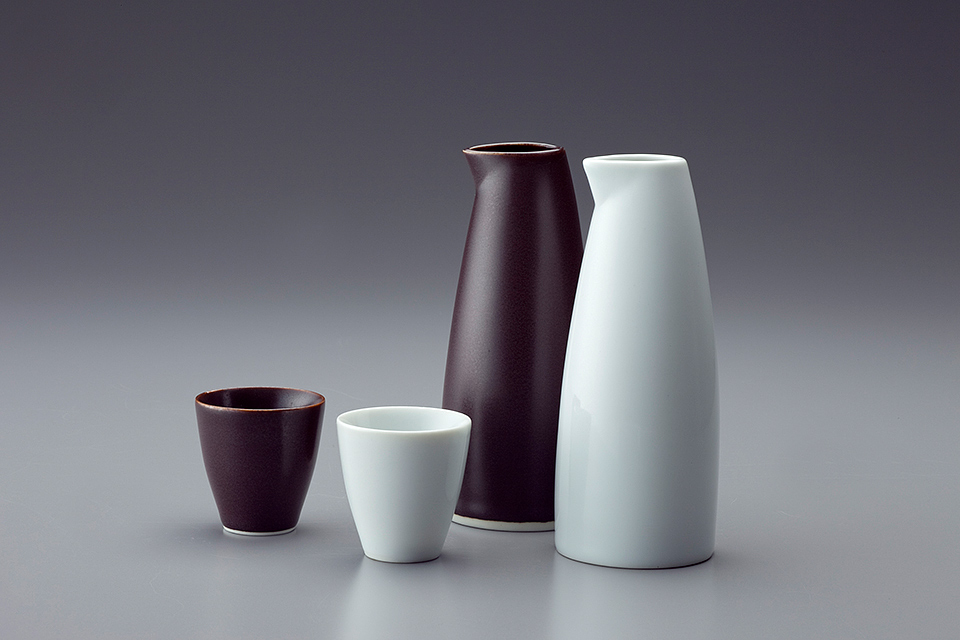
Sake Set (1957)

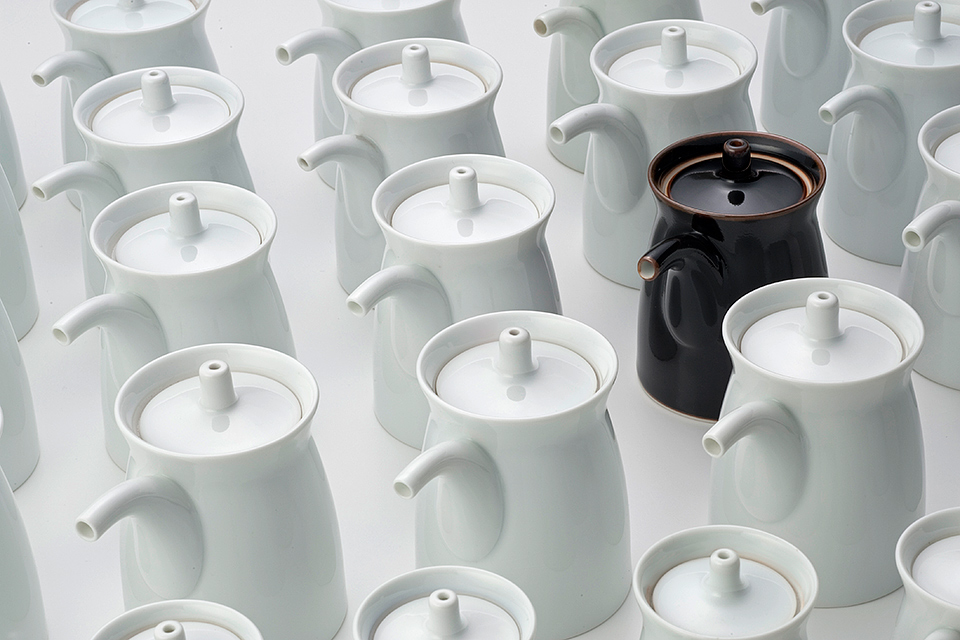
G-type Soy Sauce Bottle (1958)

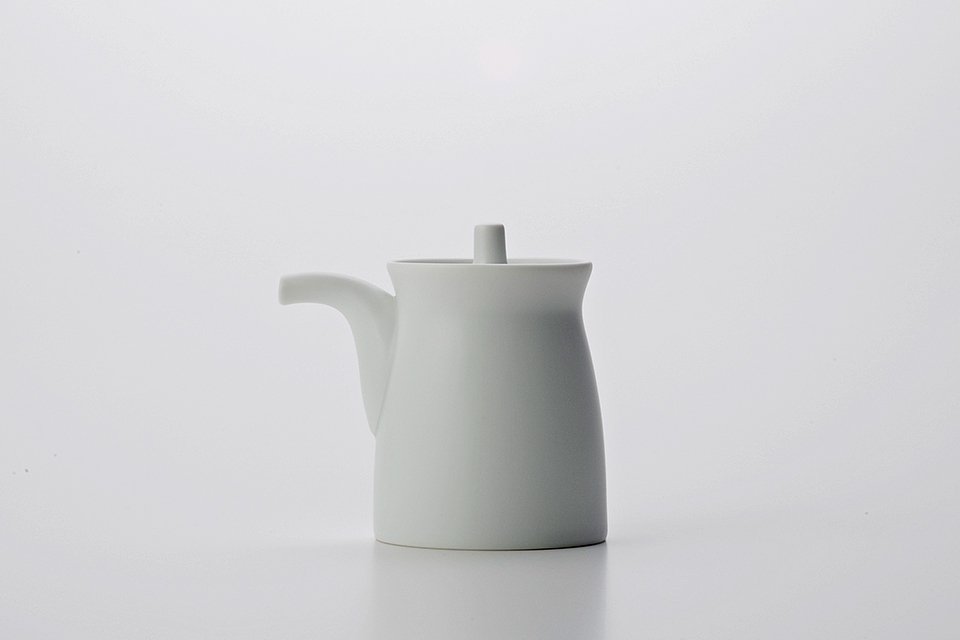
G-type Soy Sauce Bottle (1958)

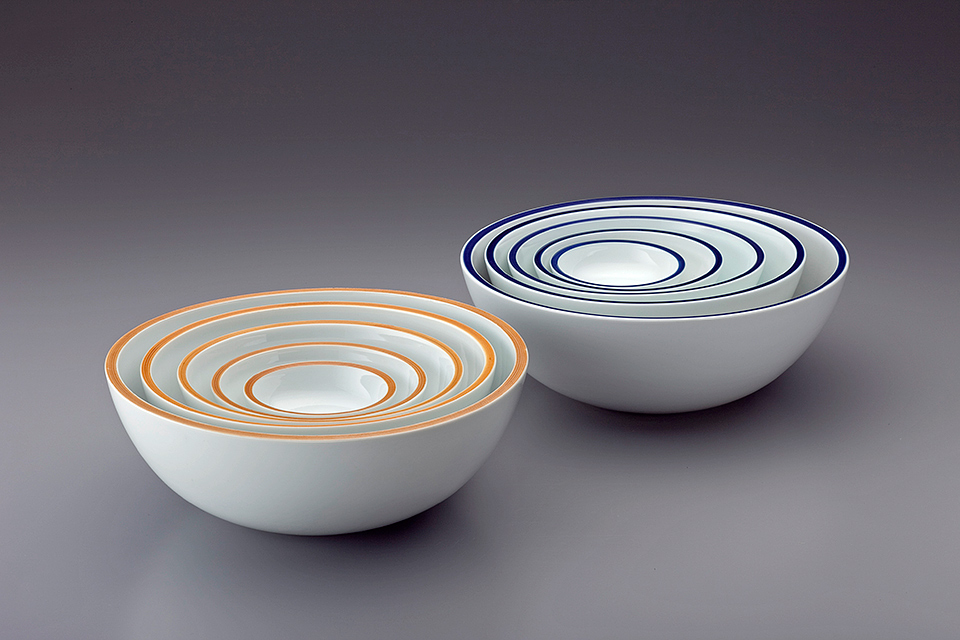
Rust fringe, Zaffer fringe Bowl (1958)

=== In the 1960s ===
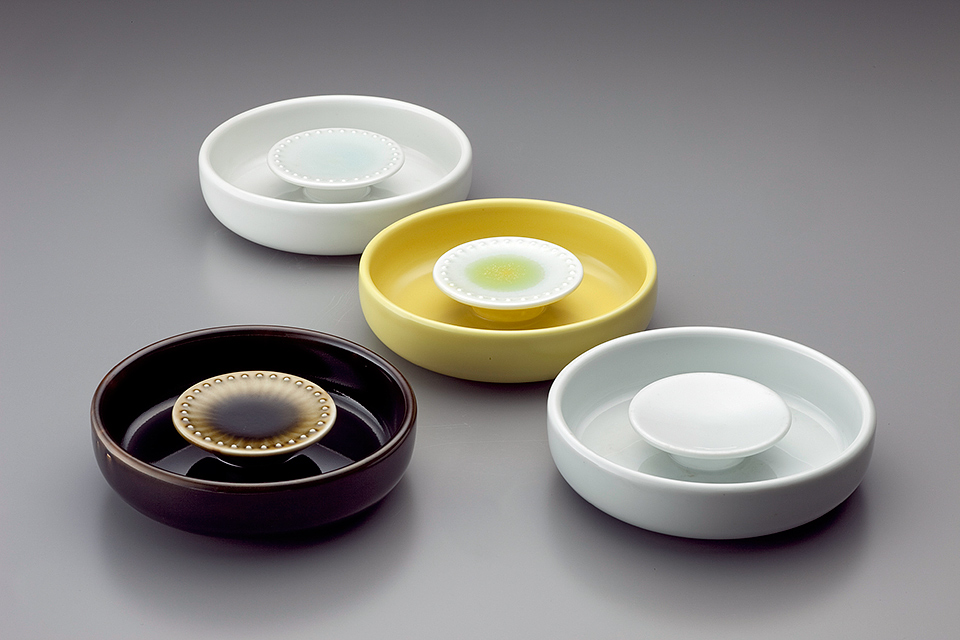
T-type Ashtray (1960)

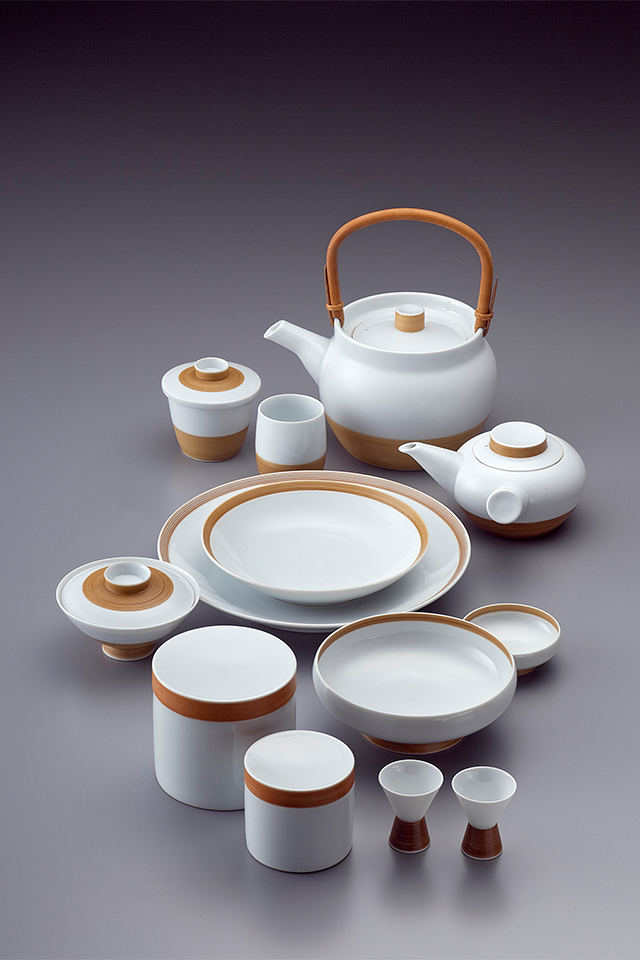
Rusty, Liner Ware series (1960)

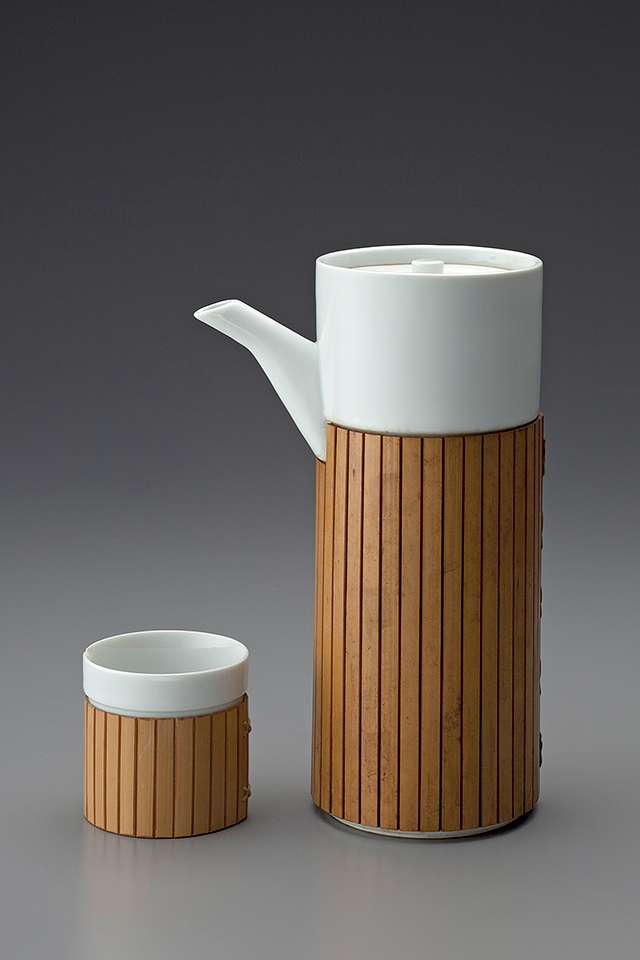
Coffee Set Rolled with Bamboo (1961)

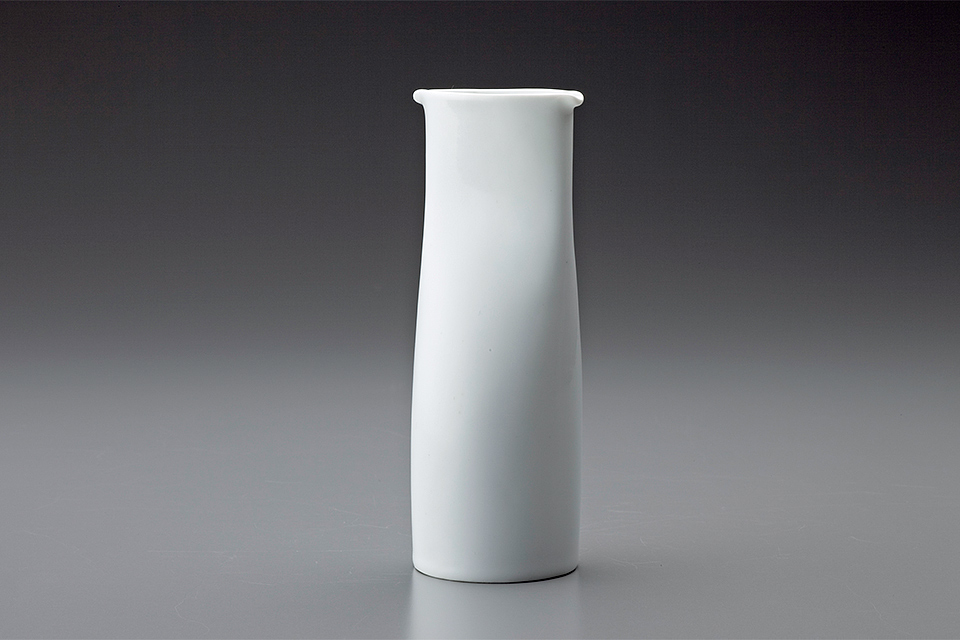
Flat Sake Bottle (1962)

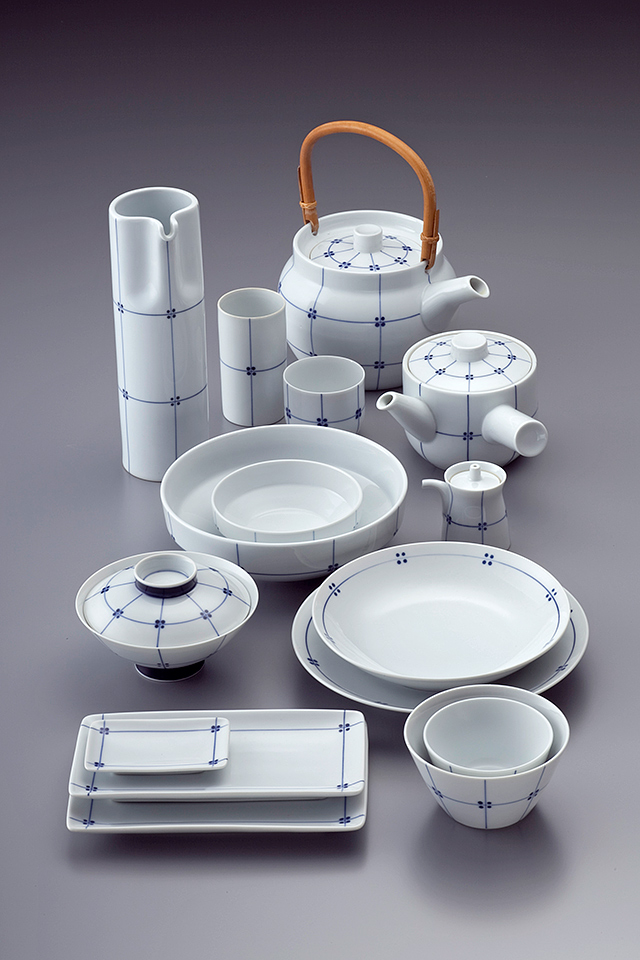
Some Goshi series (1962)

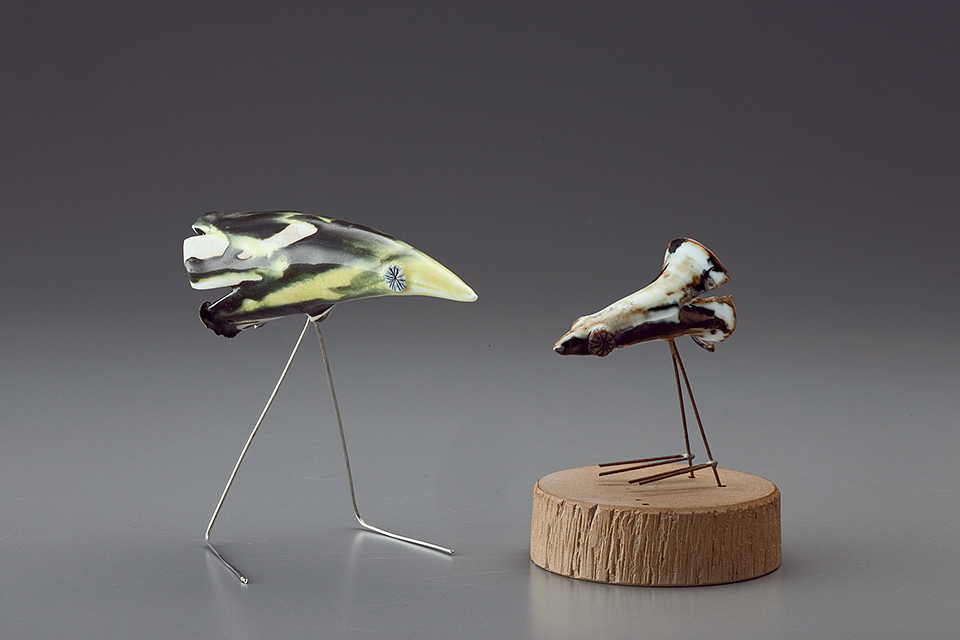
Bird Ornament (1963)

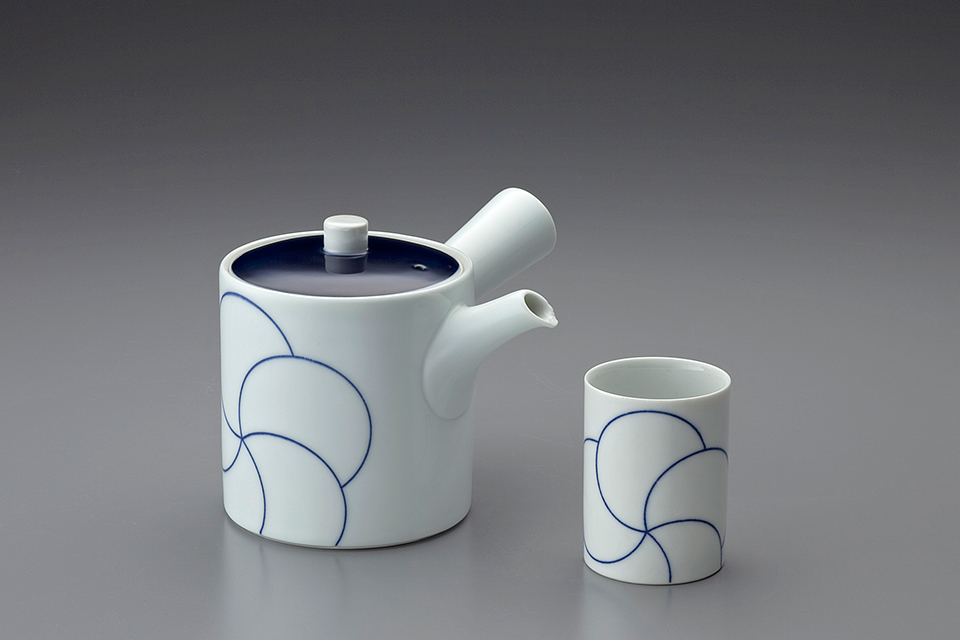
Tea Set Printed Ume Motif (1963)

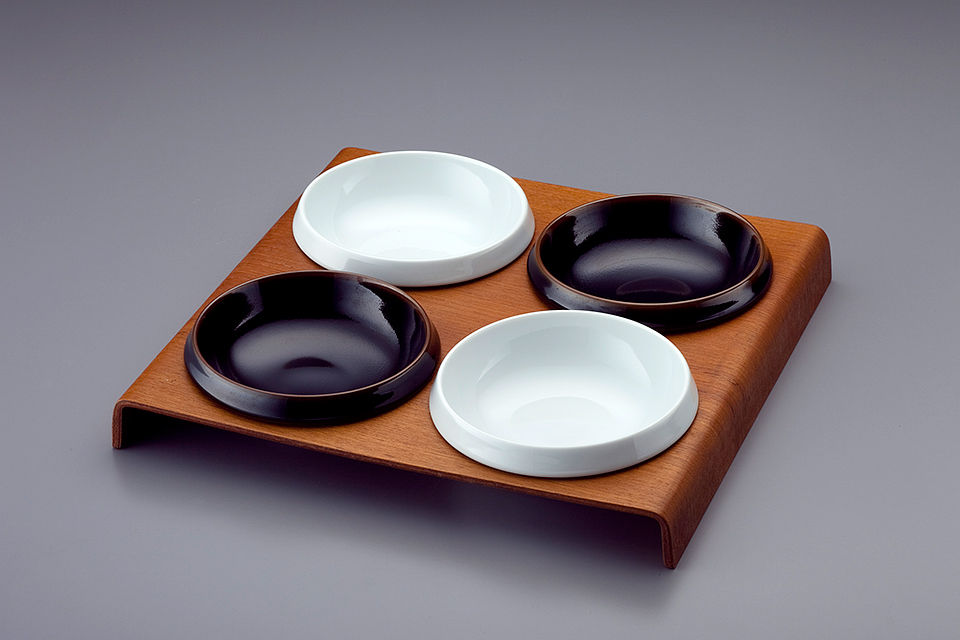
Hors d'oeuvres dishes with wood base (1963)

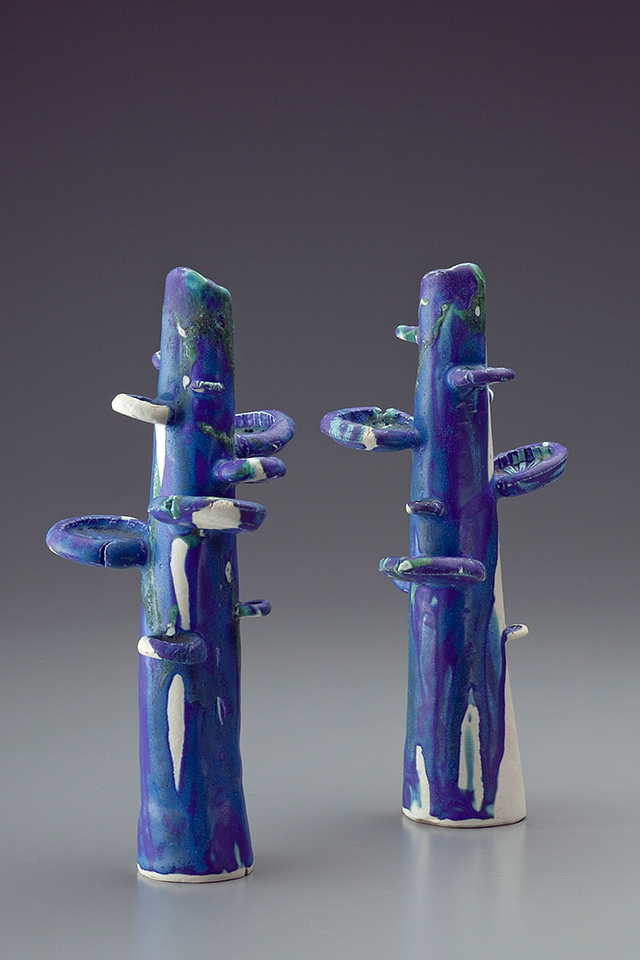
Offspring of Clay (1964)

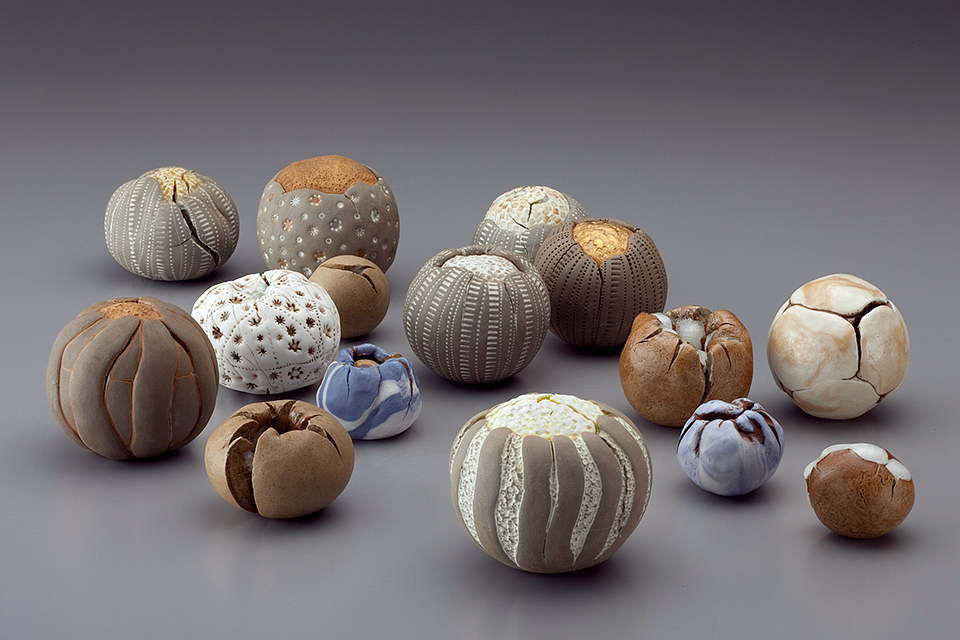
Fruit of Clay (1964-)

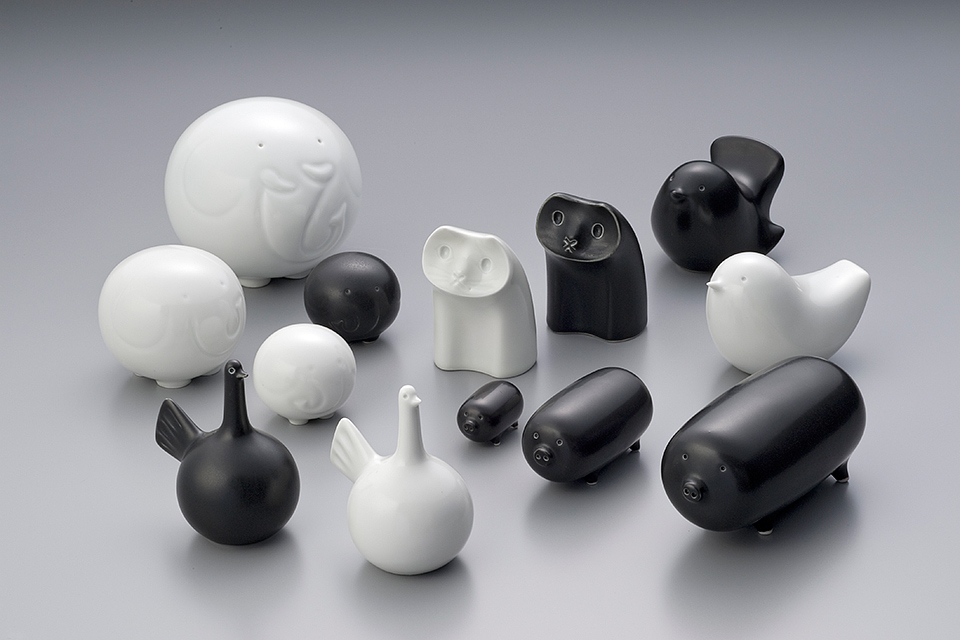
Animal Ornament (1964)

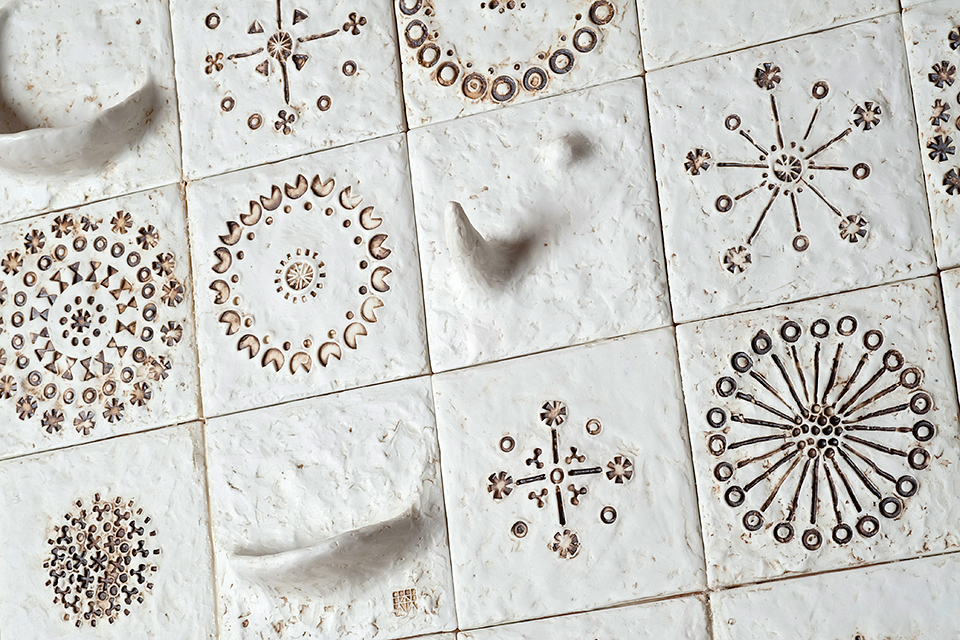
Accessory Hook (1964)

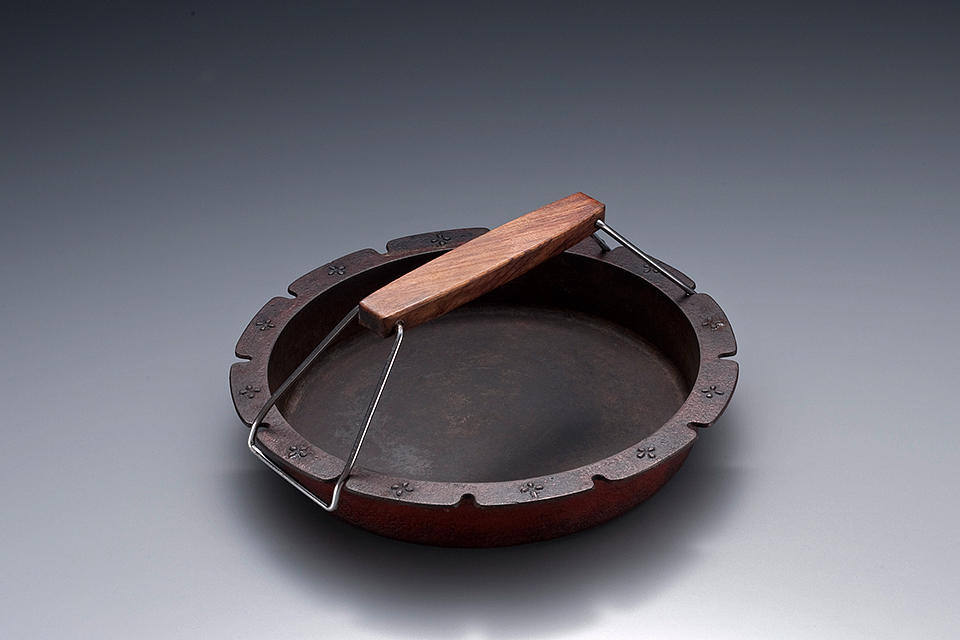
Sukiyaki Pan [iron] (1984)

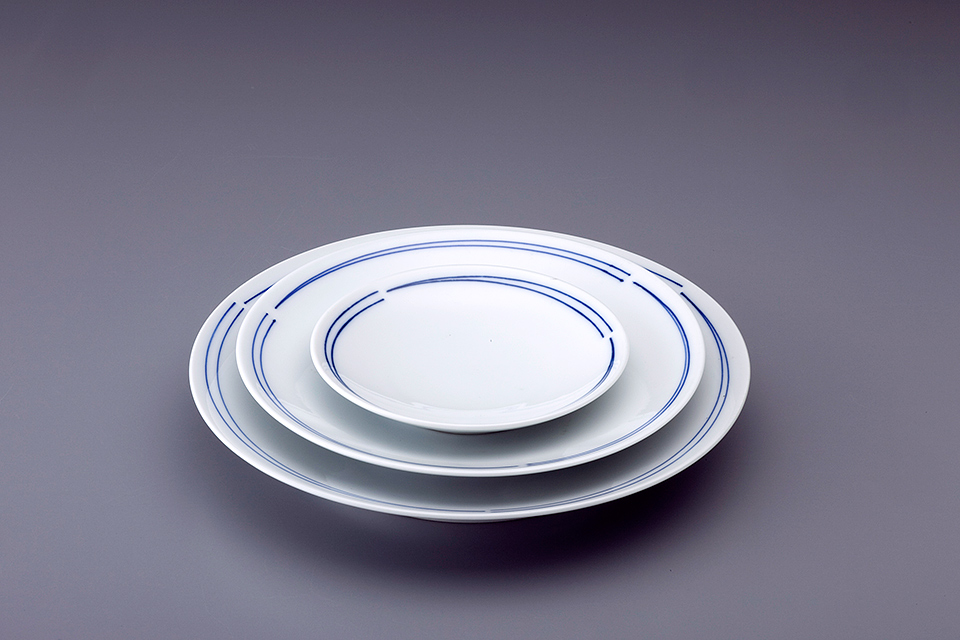
Pine needle dishes (1964)

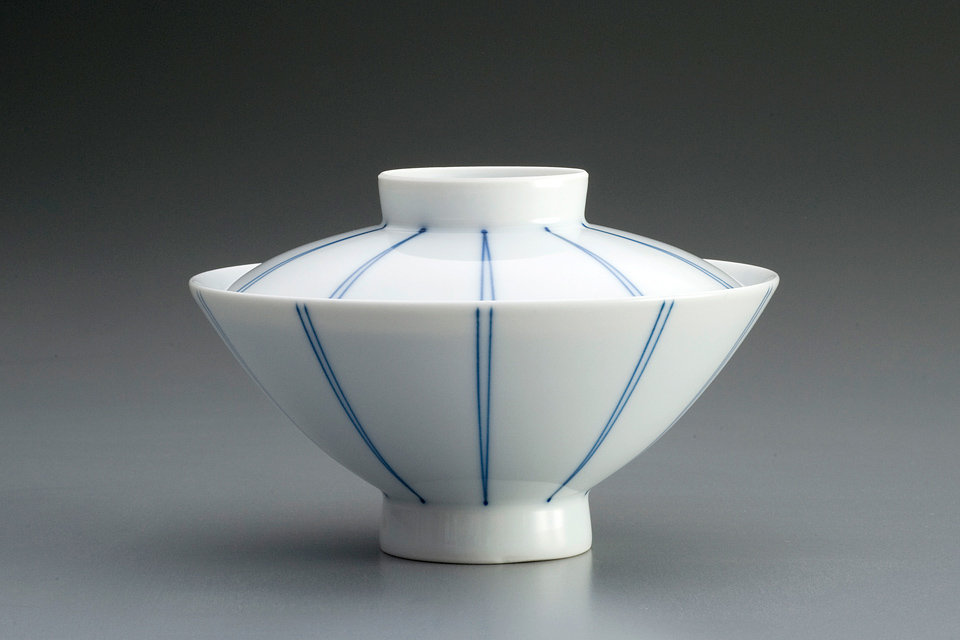
Pine needle ricebowl (1964)

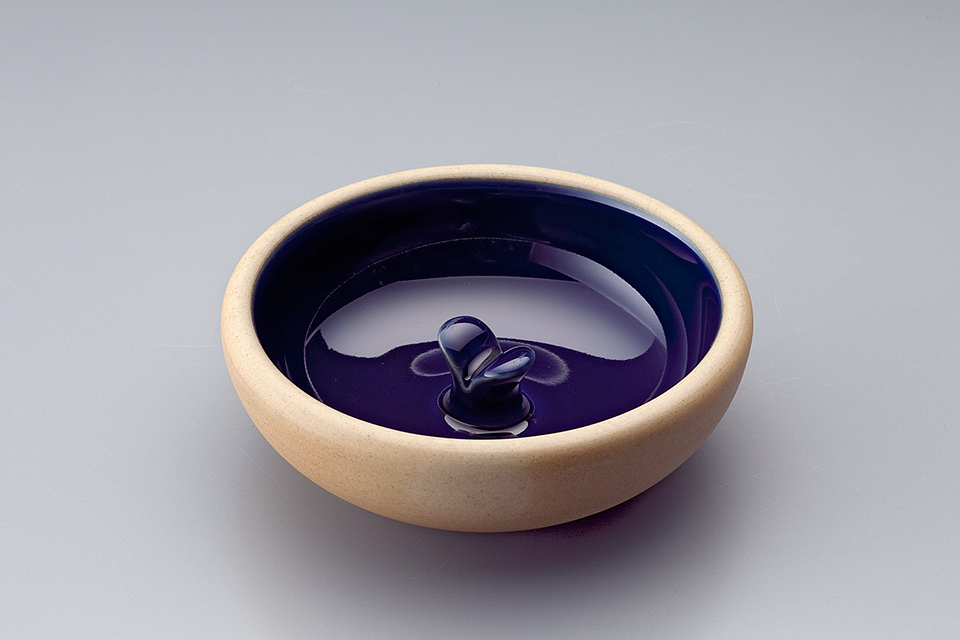
Seed Leaf Ashtray (1965)

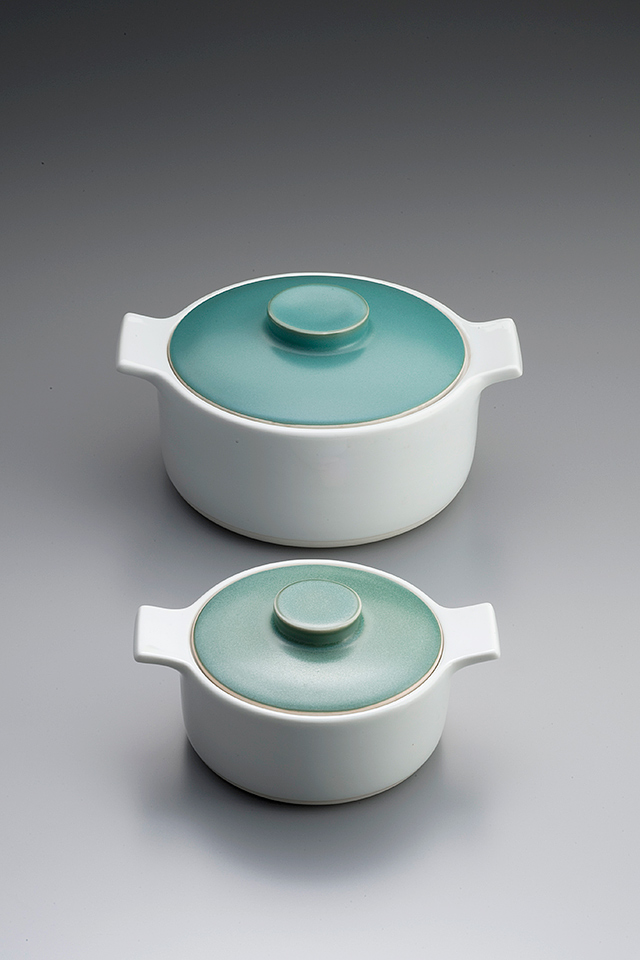
Casserole (1965)

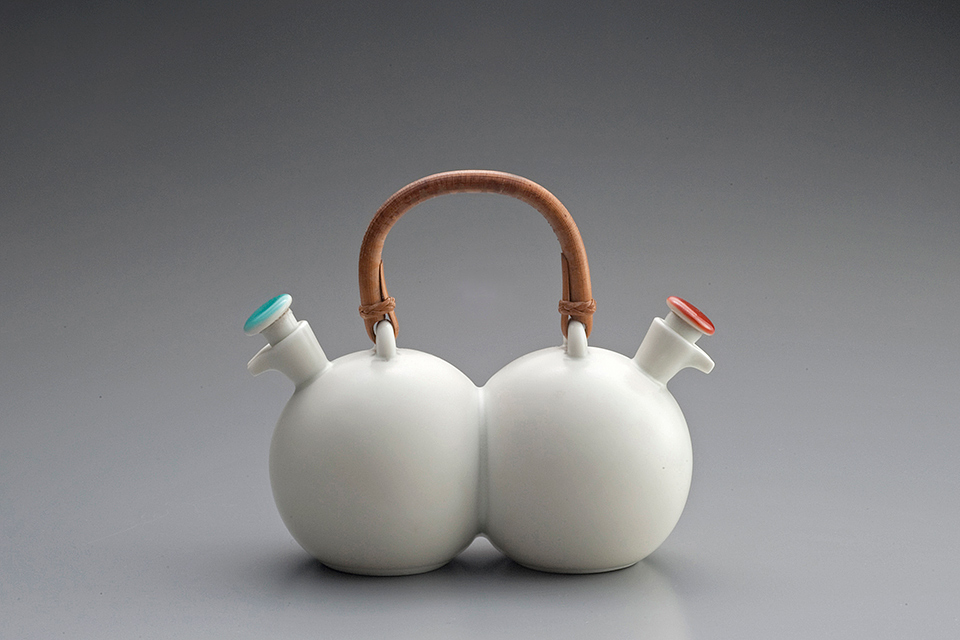
Twin Cruet (1965)

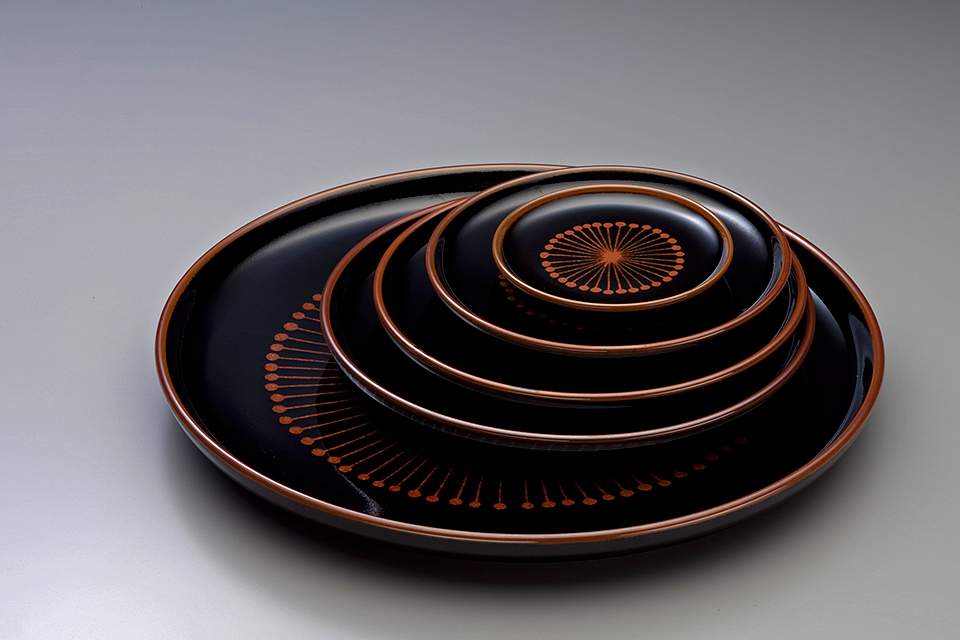
Floral Tenmoku plates (1965)

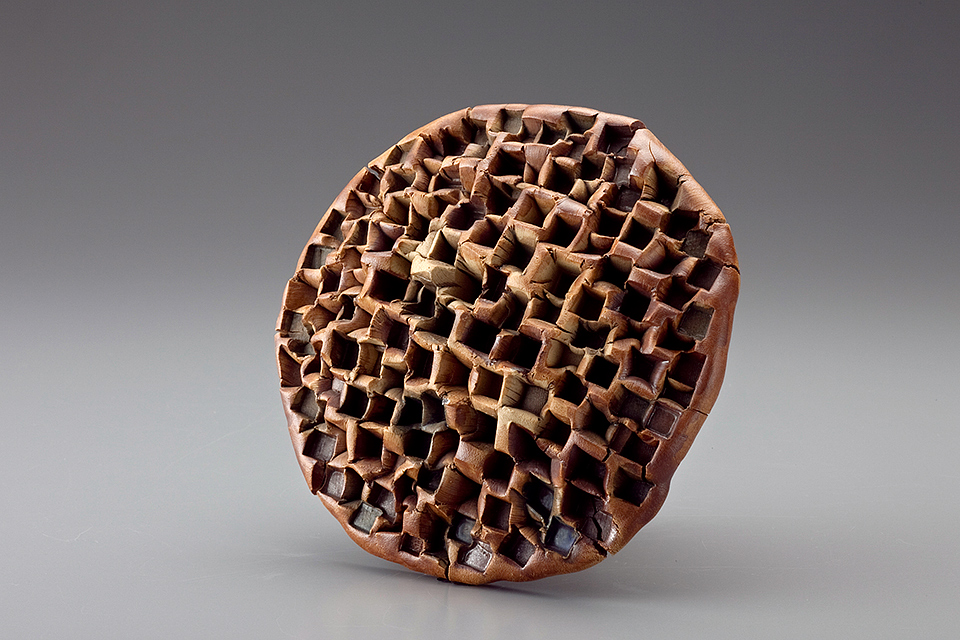
Object ware (1966)

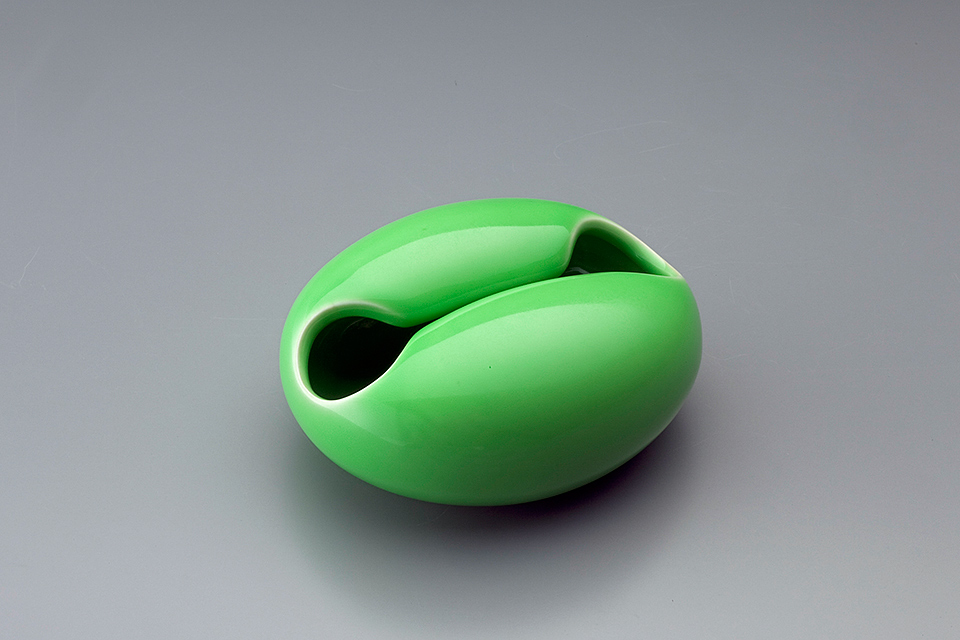
Q-type Ashtray (1966)

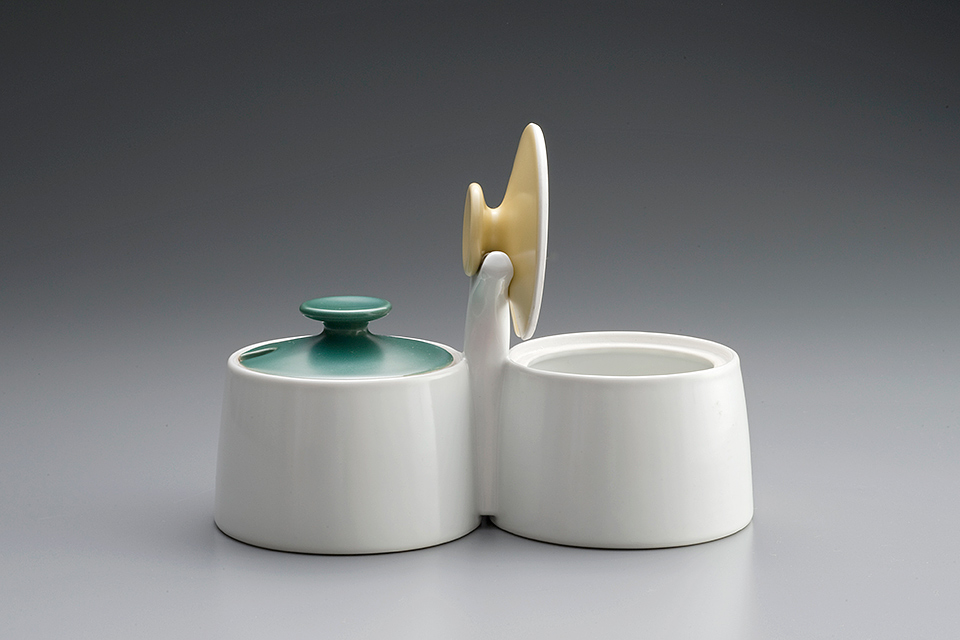
Jam Jar (1966)

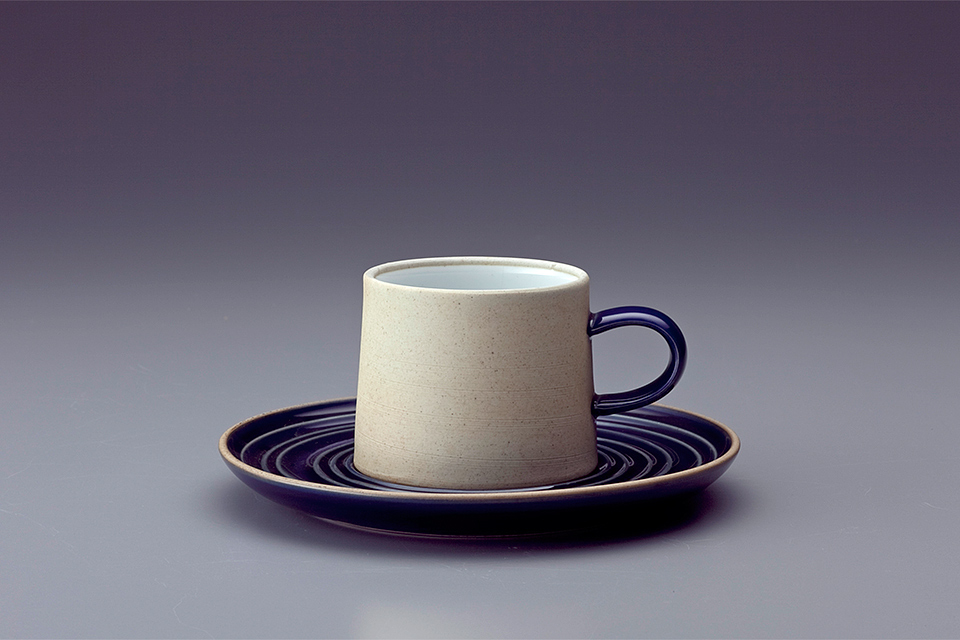
Stoneware A-type Coffee Cup (1967)

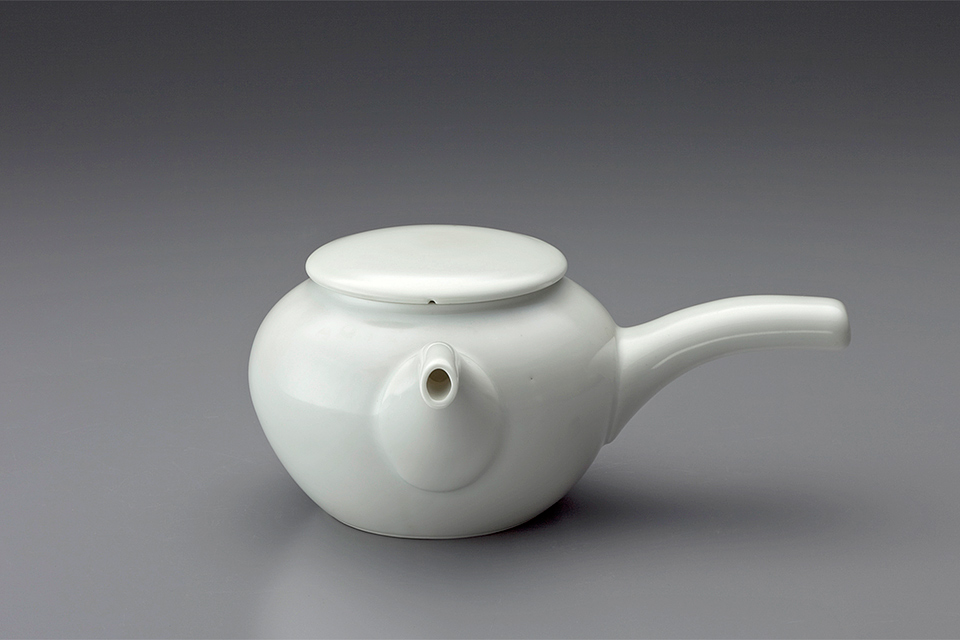
O-type Teapot (1967)

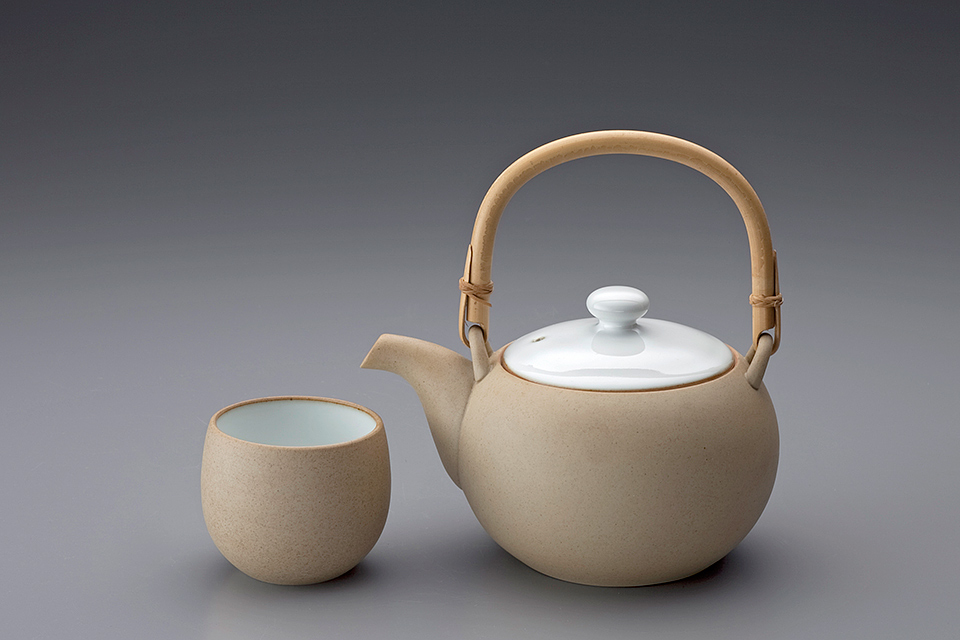
Stoneware Round Tea Set (1967)

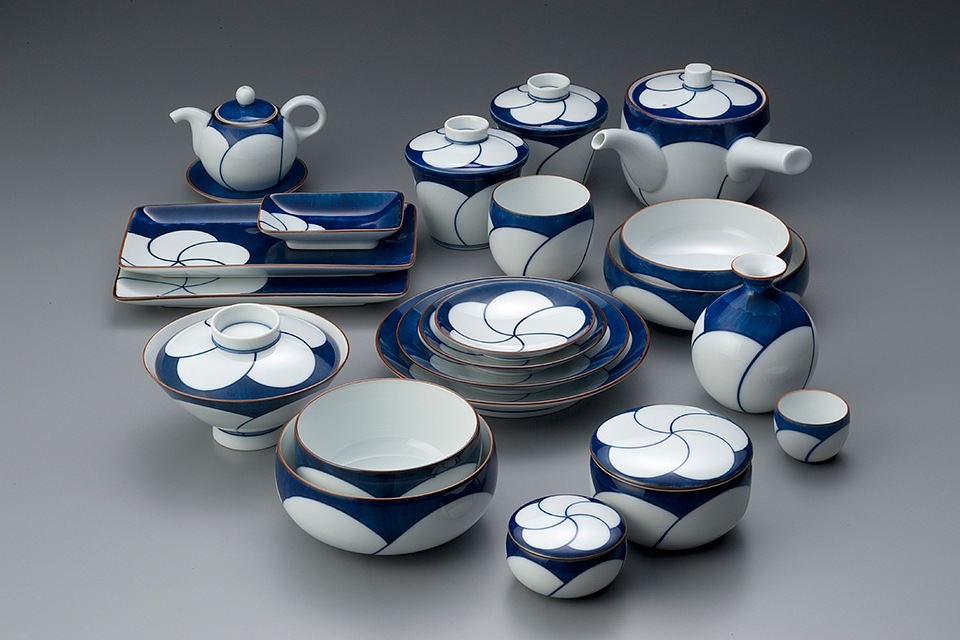
Twisted Ume Blossom series (1968)

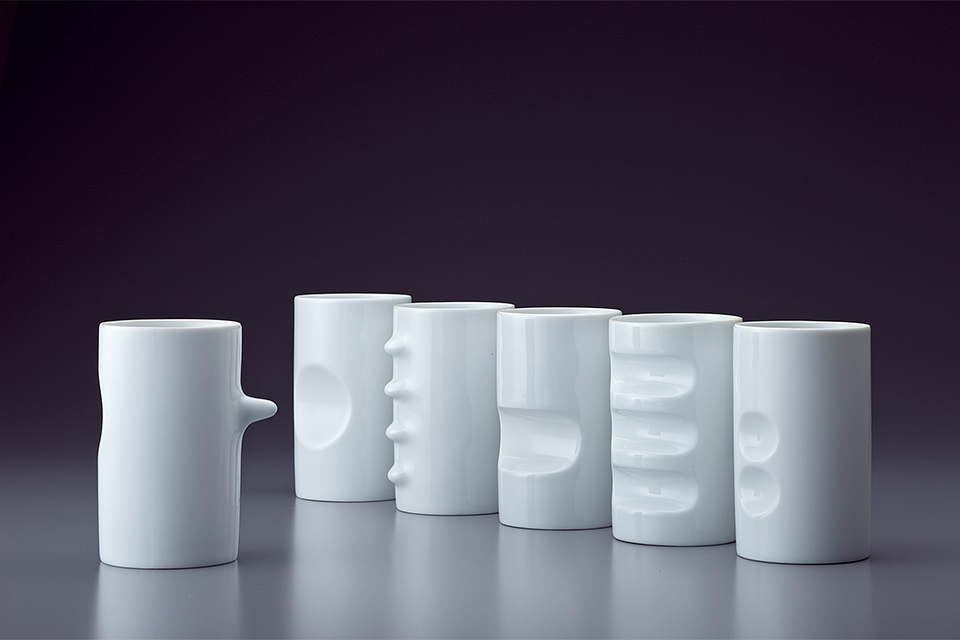
Fancy Cup (1969)

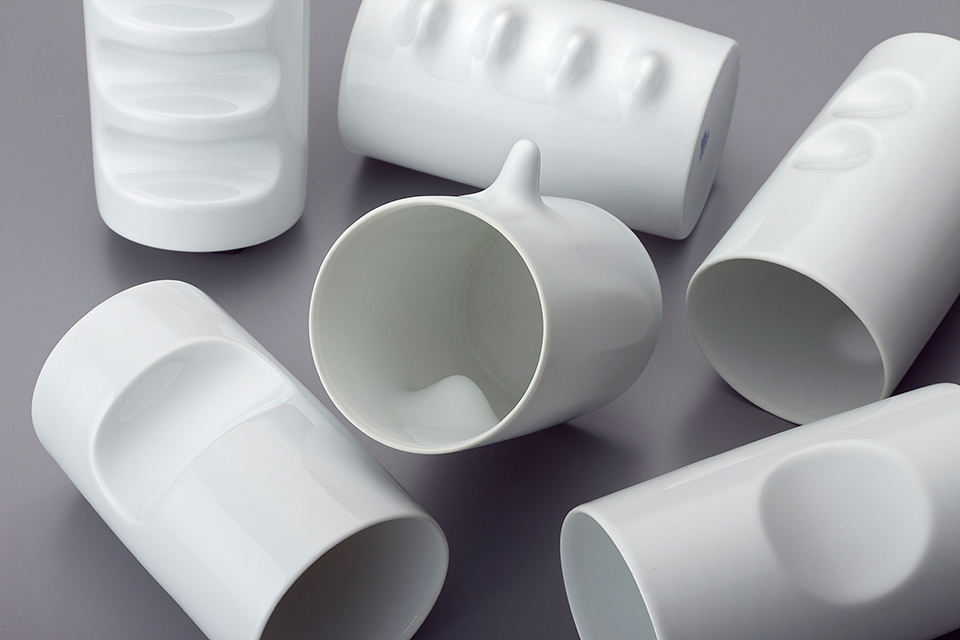
Fancy Cup (1969)

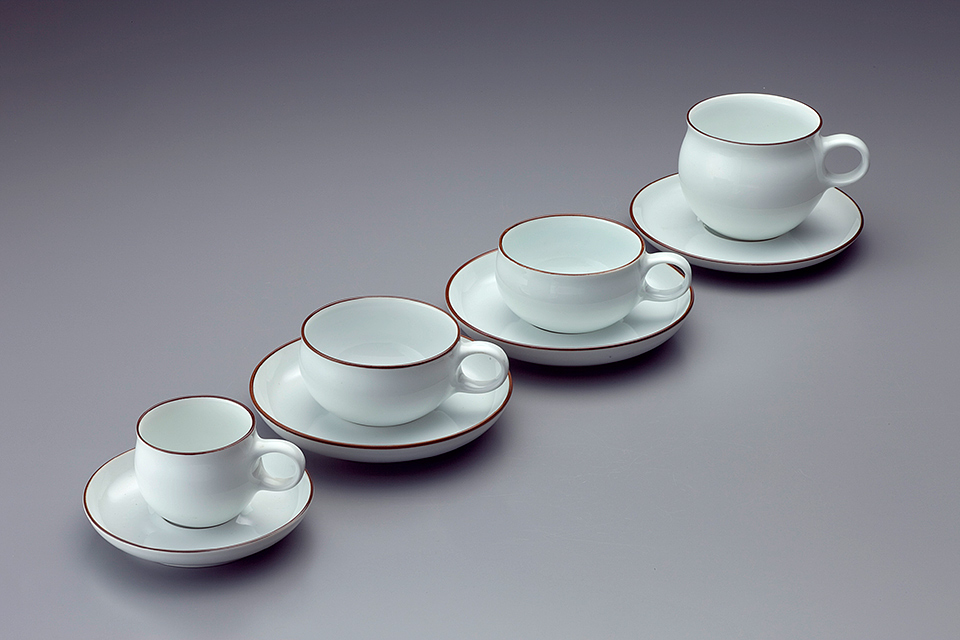
from the left : G-type Demitasse / G-type Coffee Cup / G-type Tea Cup / G-type Morning Cup (1969)

=== In the 1970s ===
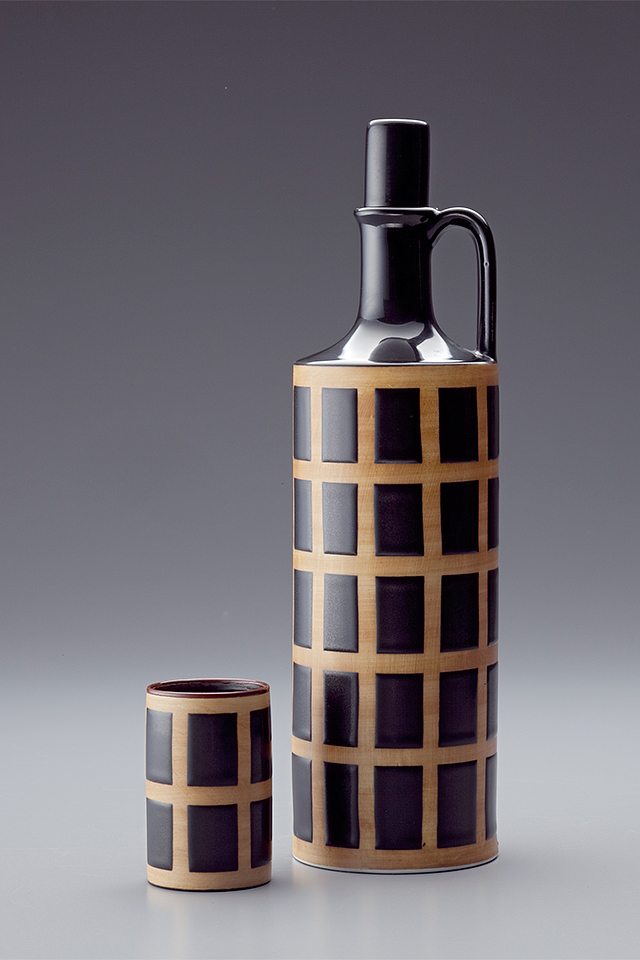
Liquor Set (1970)

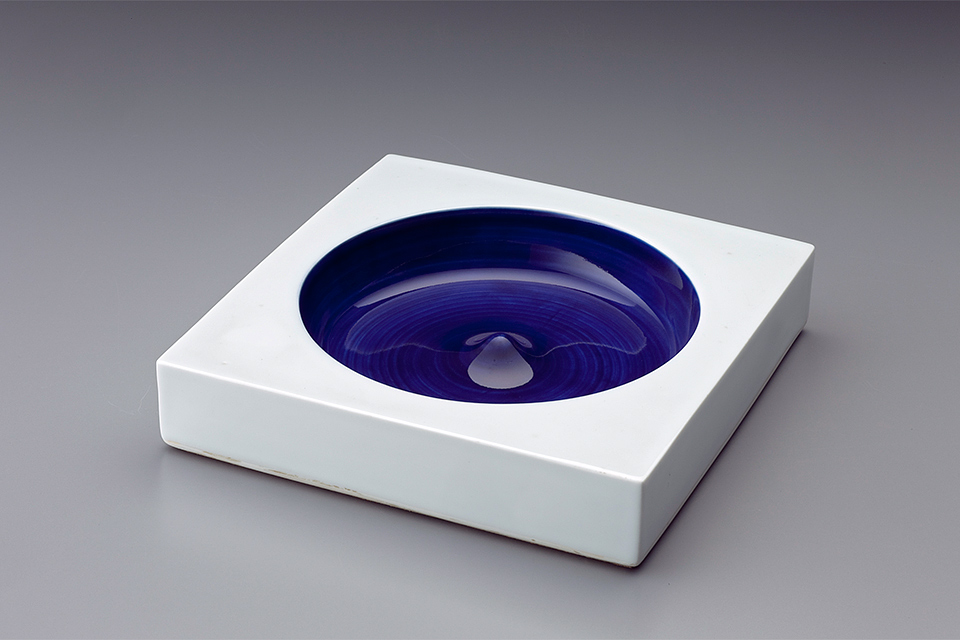
Square Ashtray (1970)

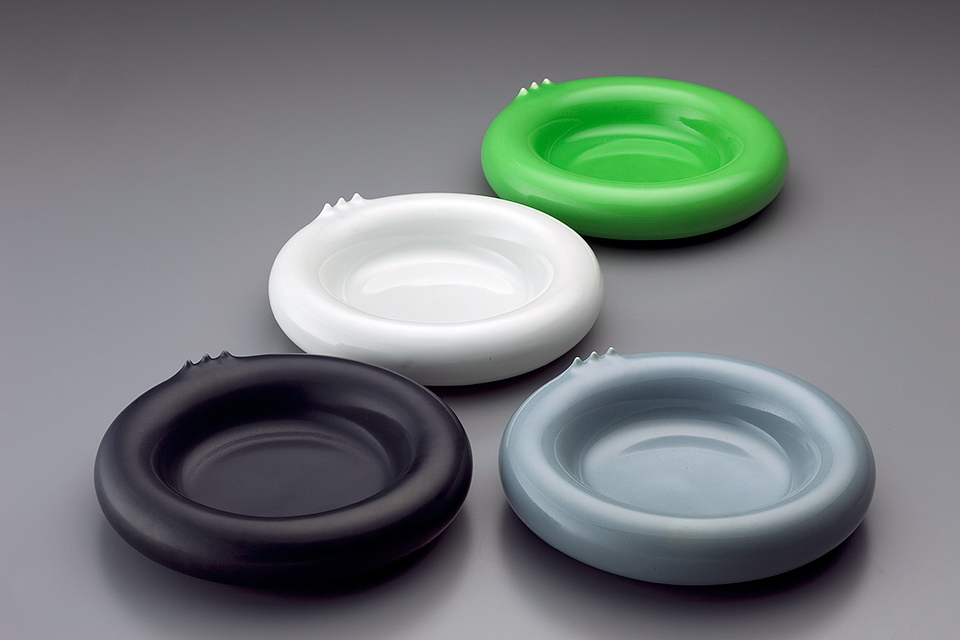
Ring Ashtray (1970)

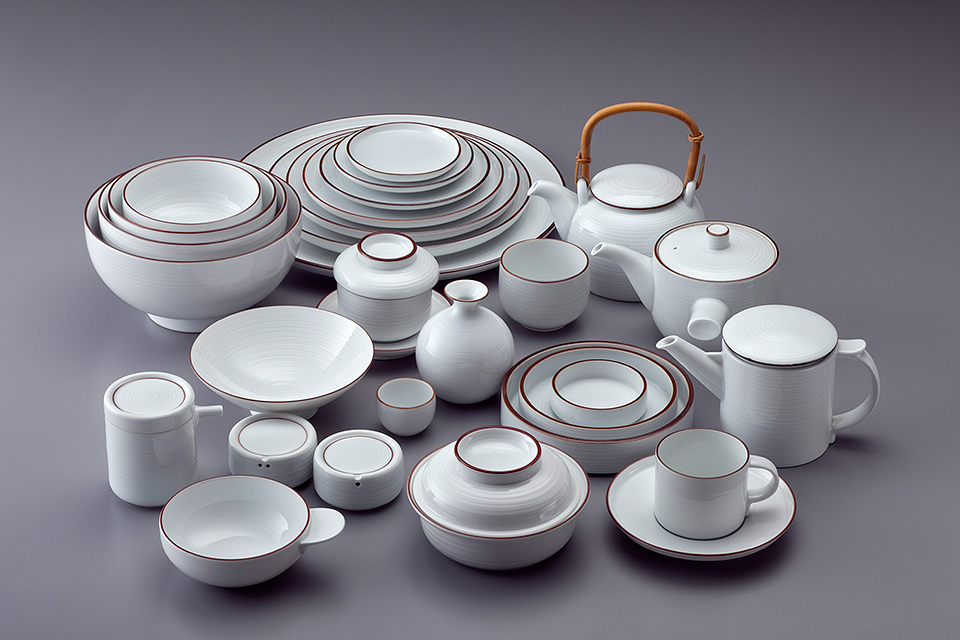
White Strings Ware series (1971)

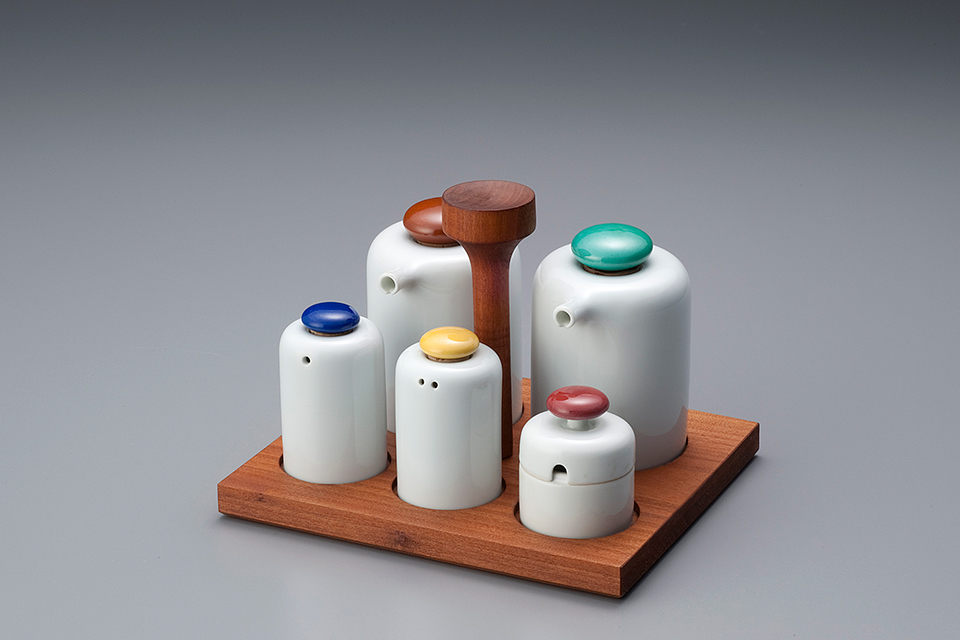
U-type Seasoning Set (1971)

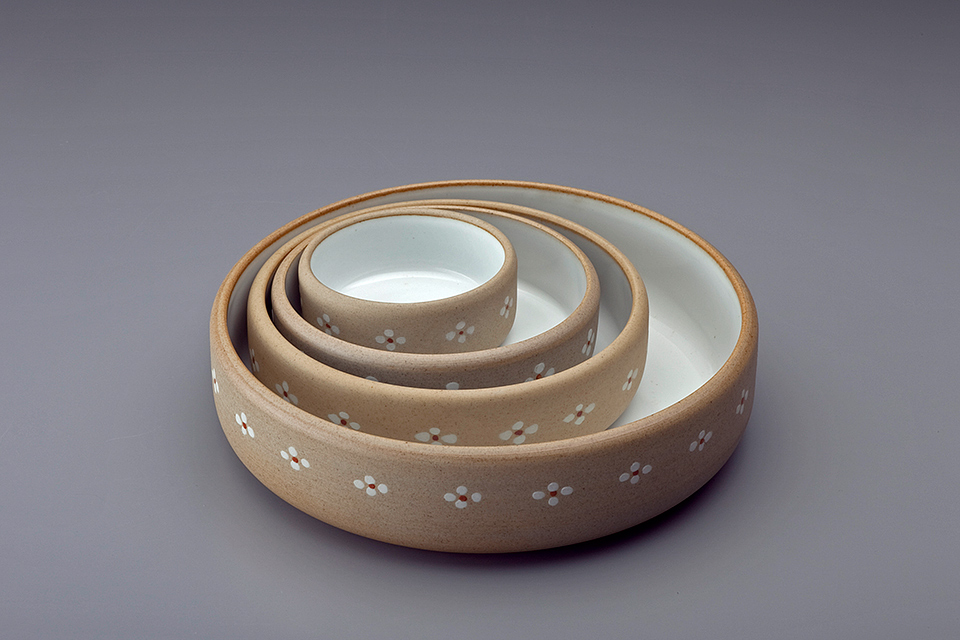
Stoneware Shallow Bowl (1971)

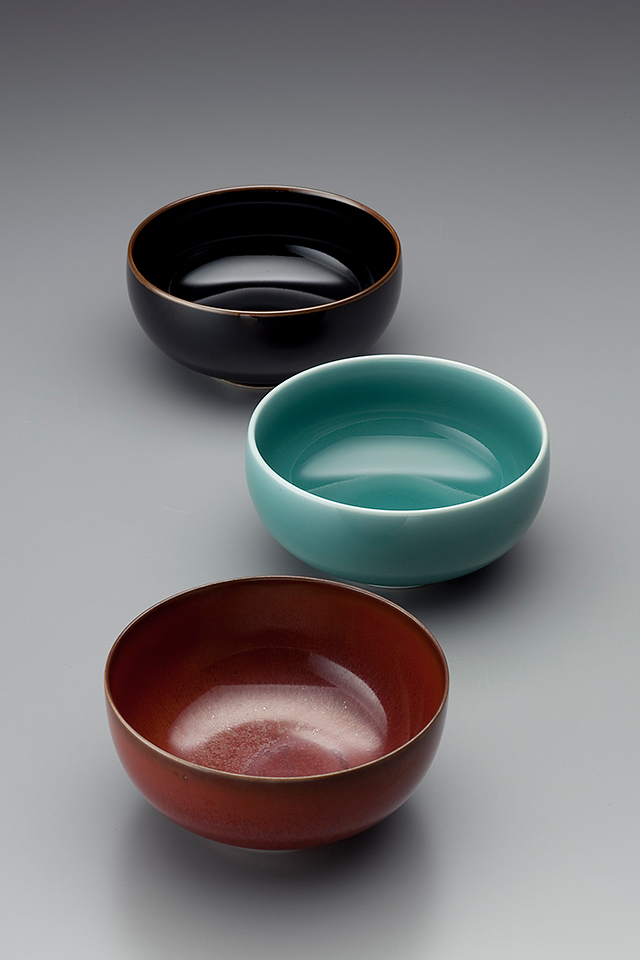
Tenmoku Soup Bowl (back), Celadon Soup Bowl (center), Red Iron Soup Bowl (front) (1972)

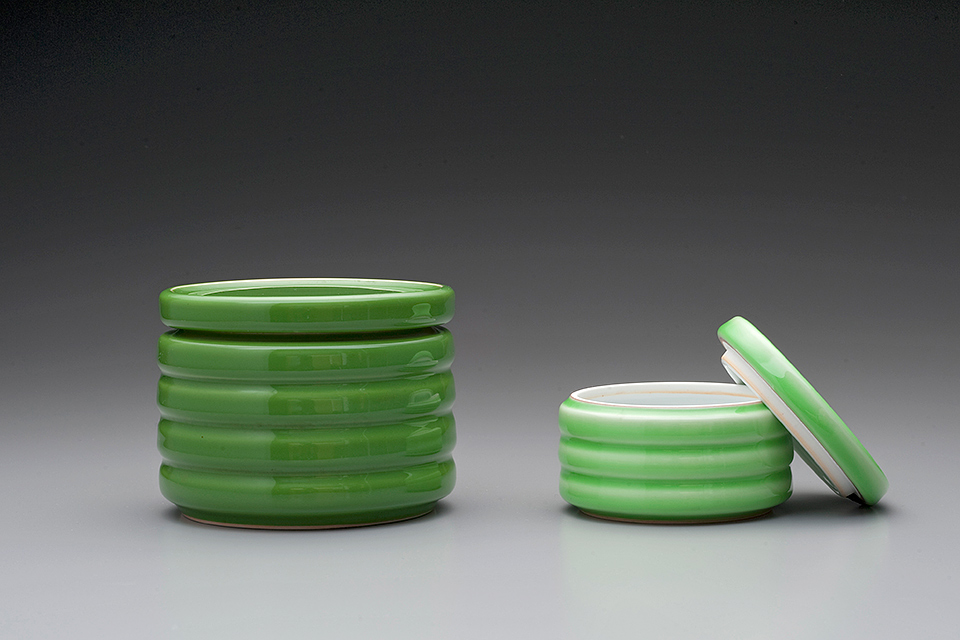
Lidded Jar (1972)

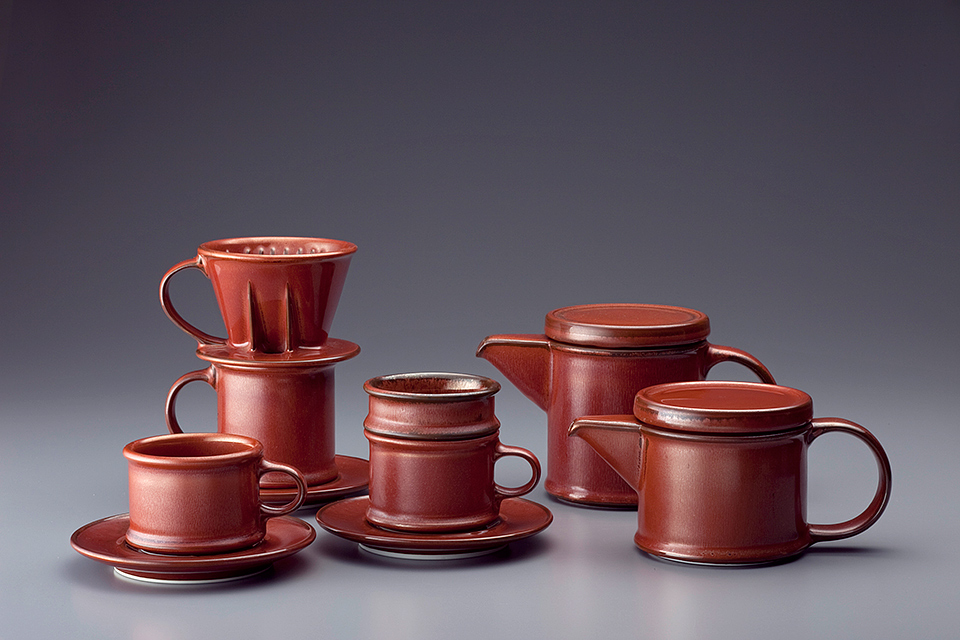
H-type Coffee Service (1972)

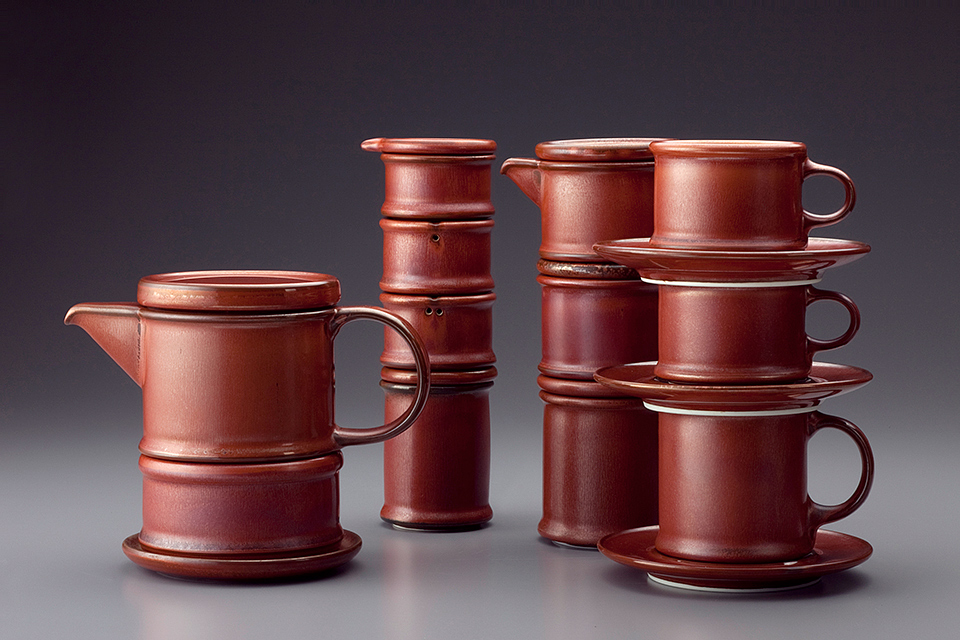
H-type set (1972)

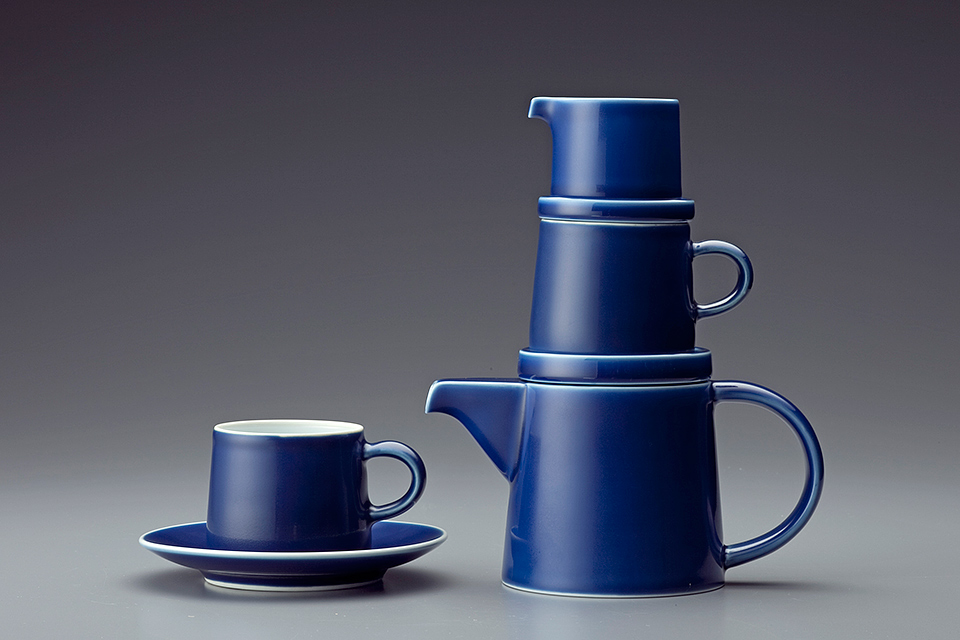
M-type Coffee Set (1973)

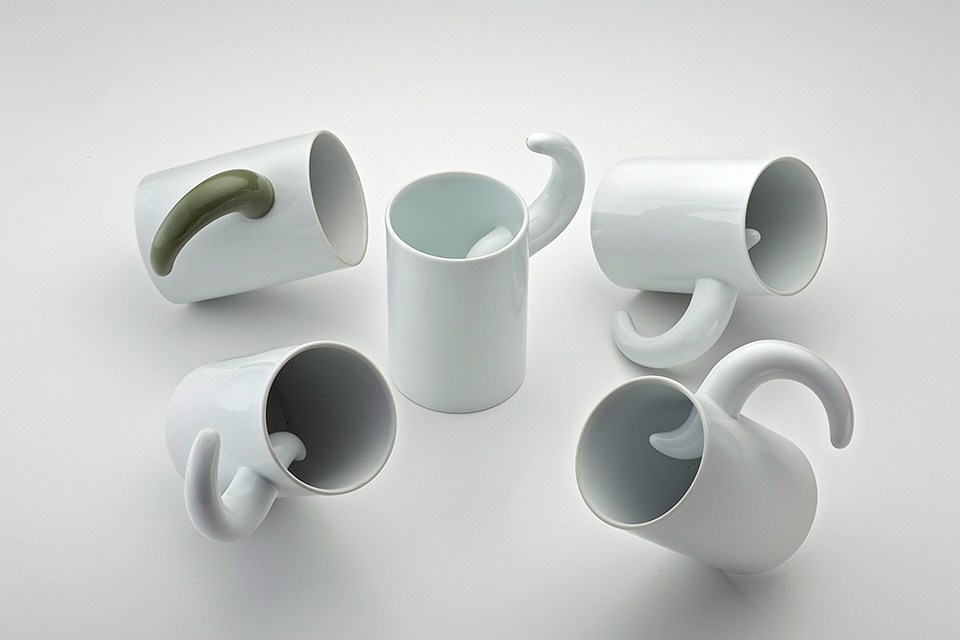
Horn Mug (1973)

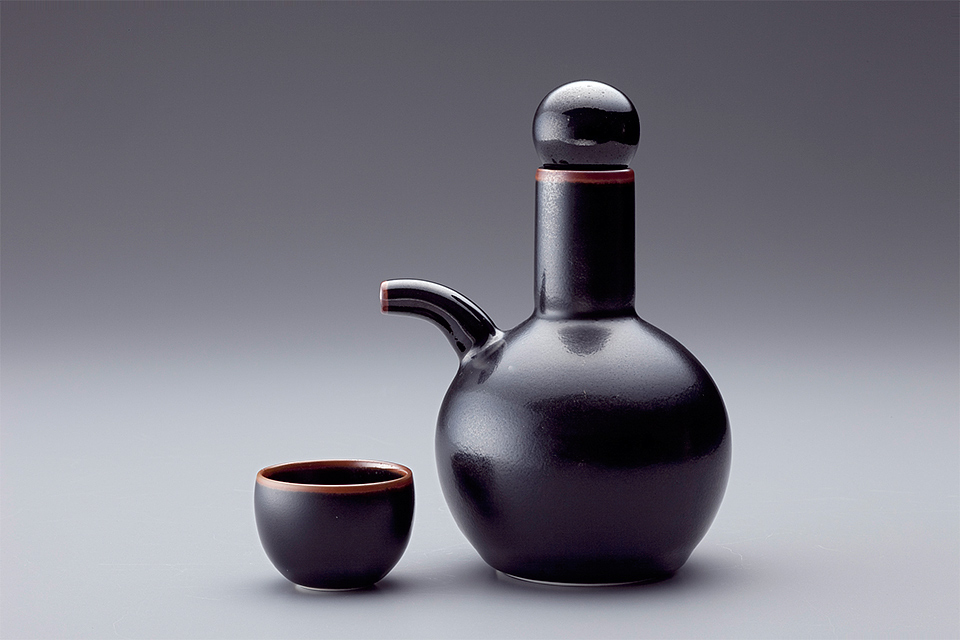
Lidded Sake Set (1973)

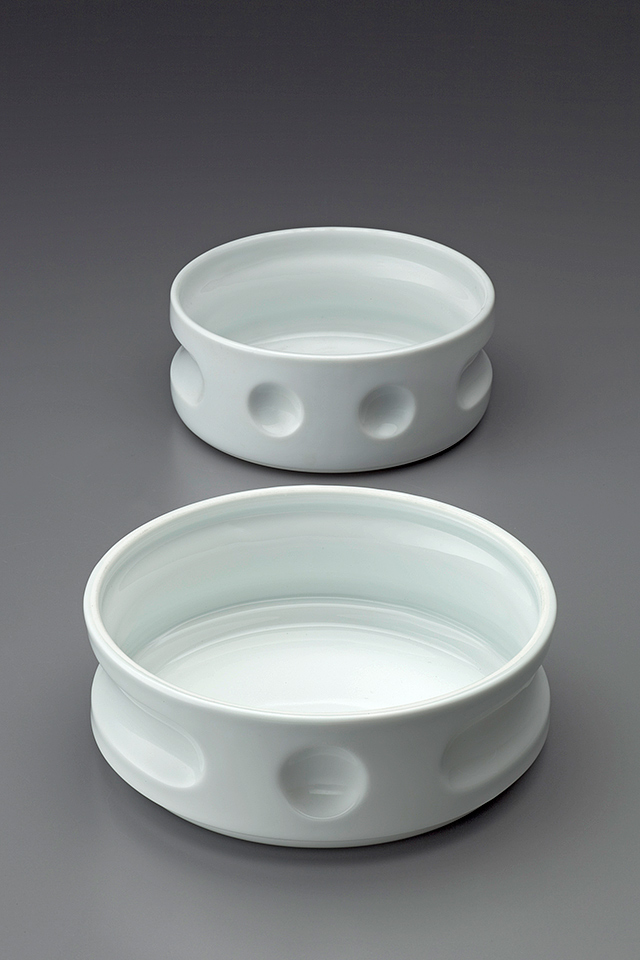
Fancy Bowl (front), Finger Bowl (back) (1974)

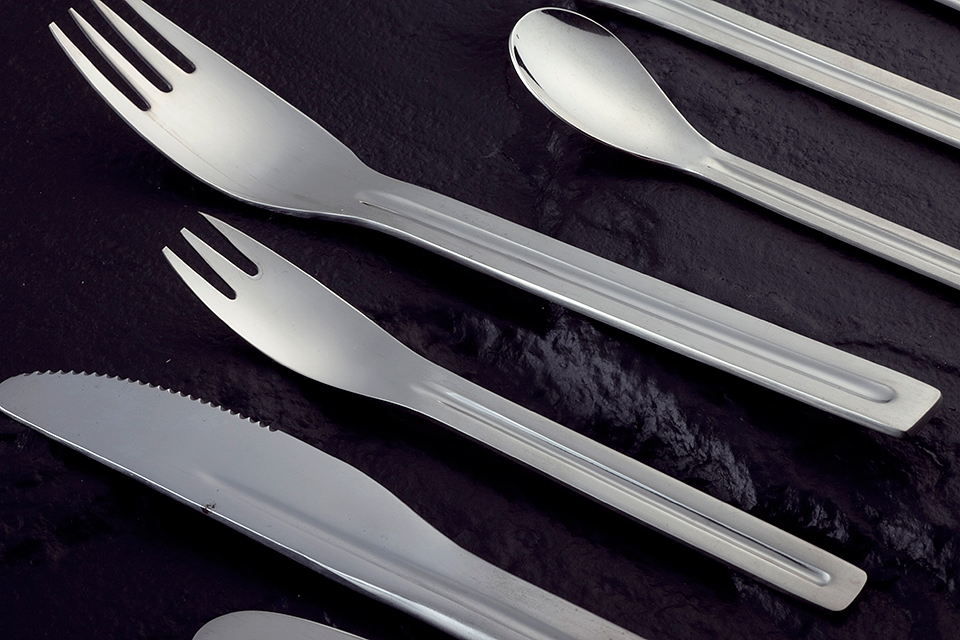
S-type Cutlery (1974)

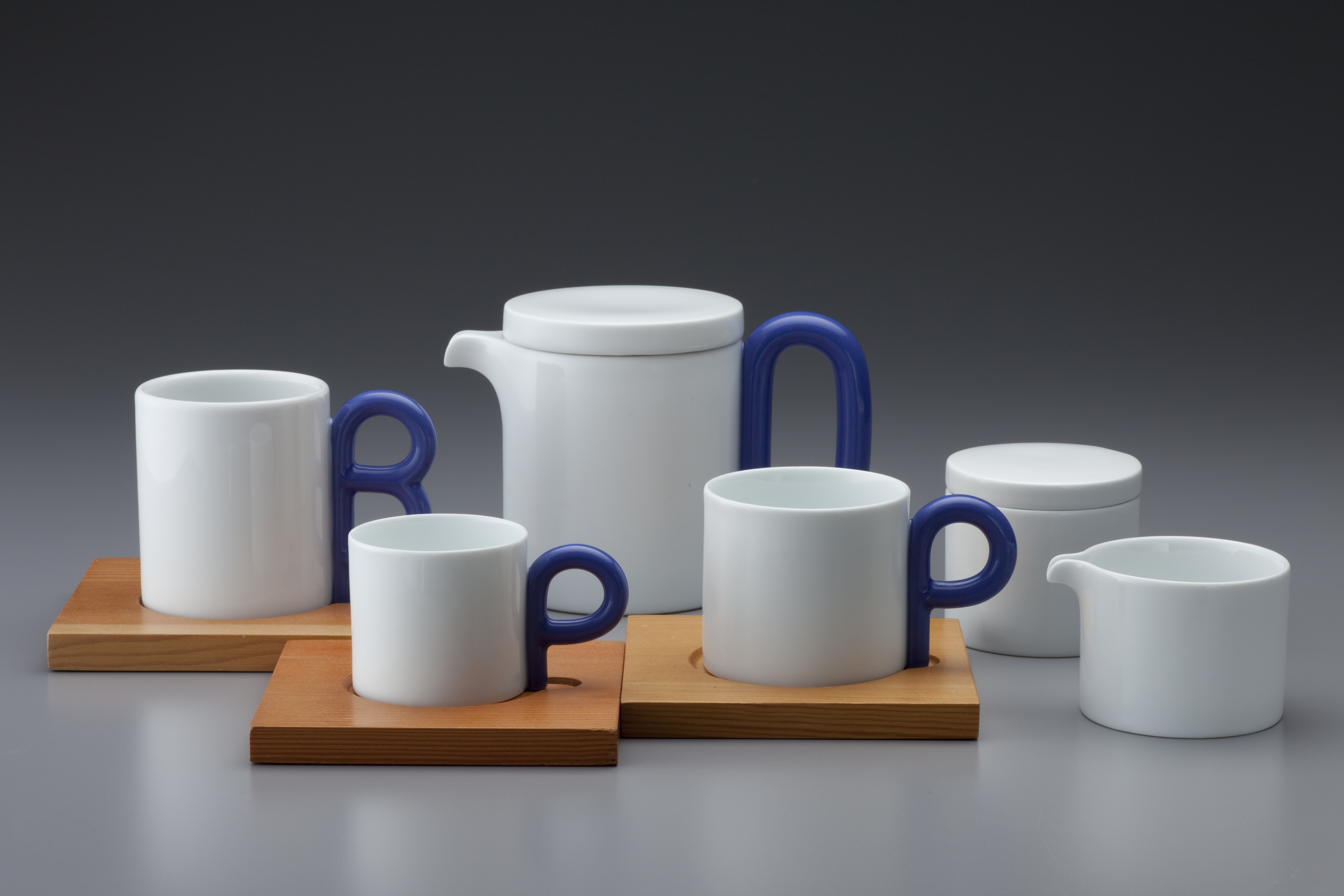
P-type Coffee Service (1974)

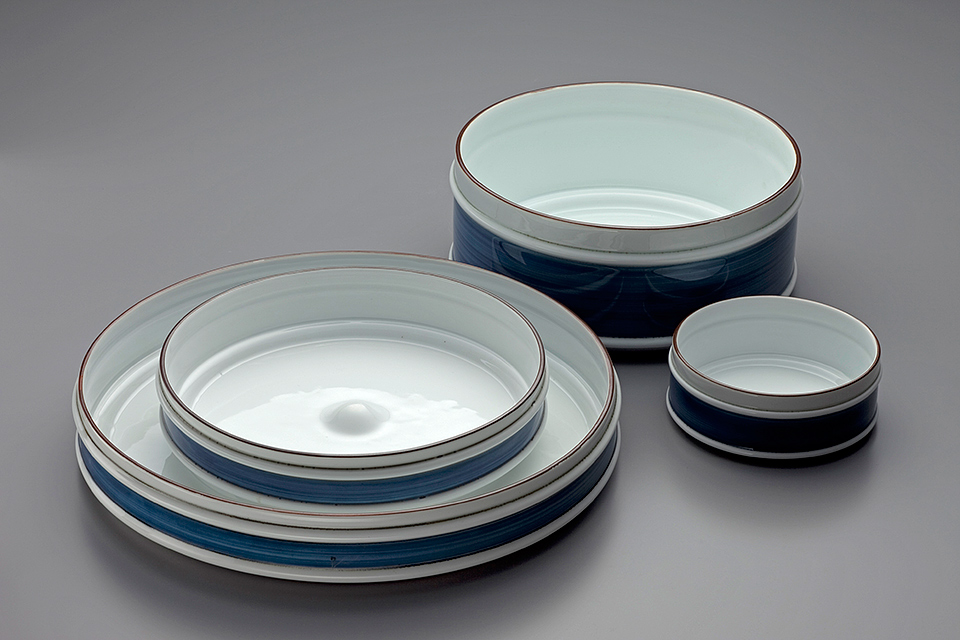
S-type Serving bowl, Bowl (1975)

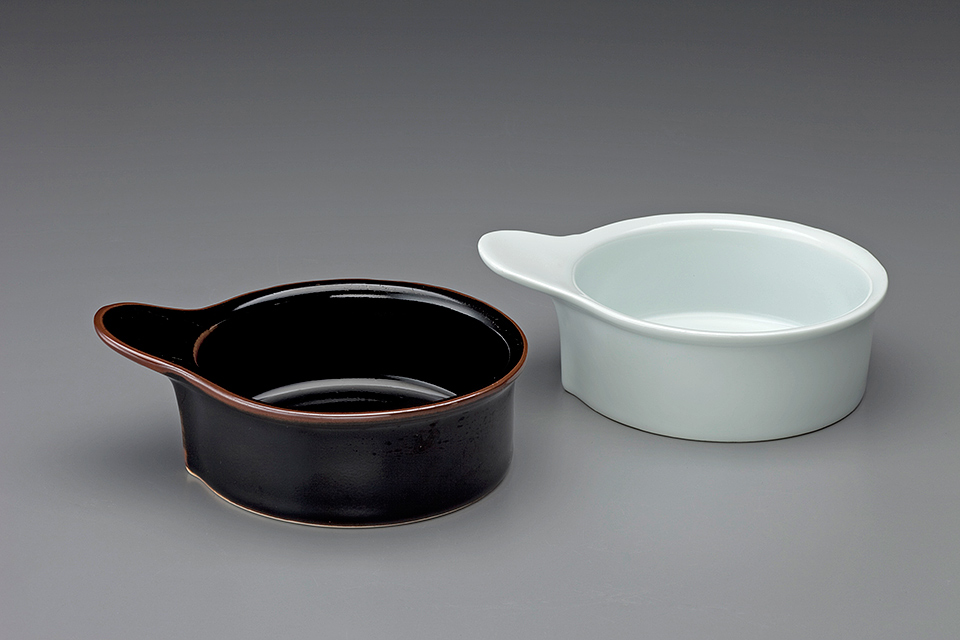
Bowl with Handle (1975)

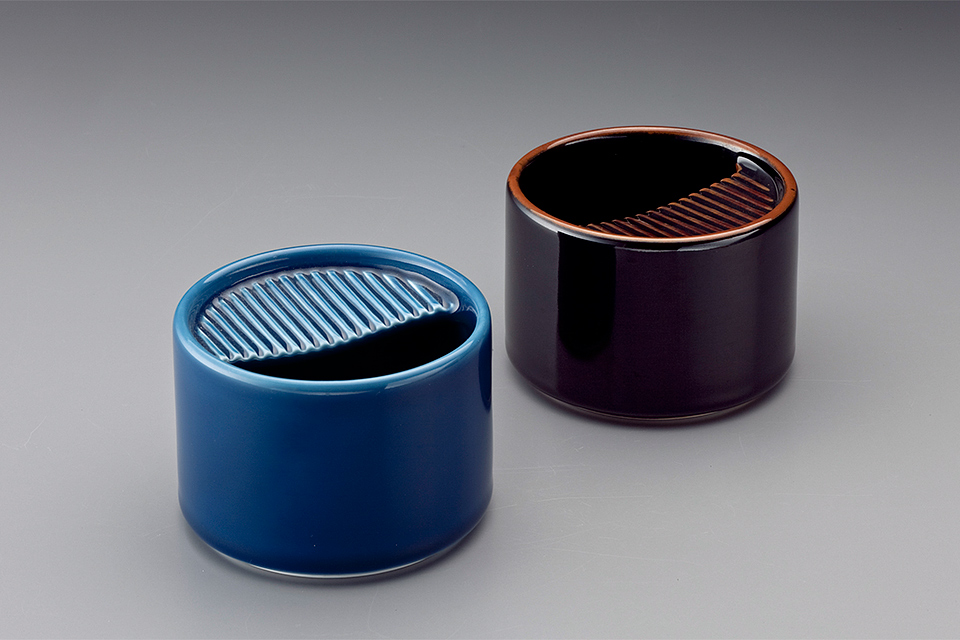
S-type Ashtray (1976)

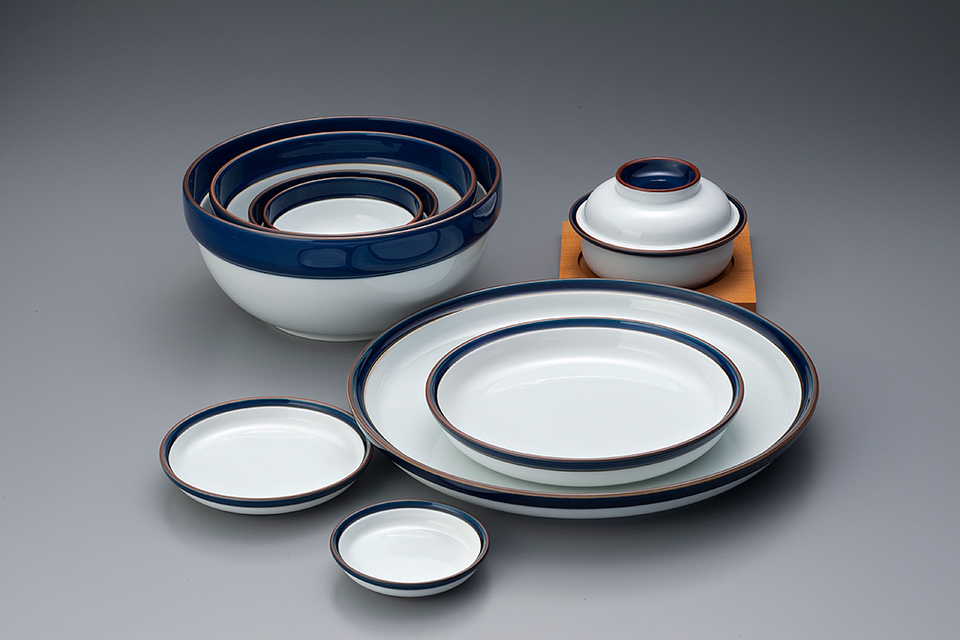
Multi series (1976)

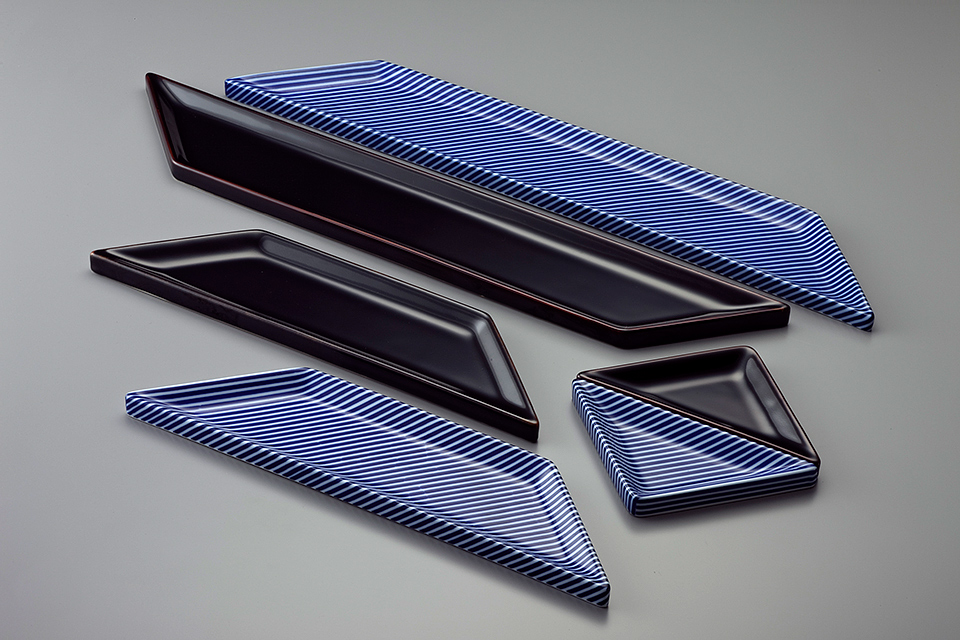
A-type Party Tray (1976)

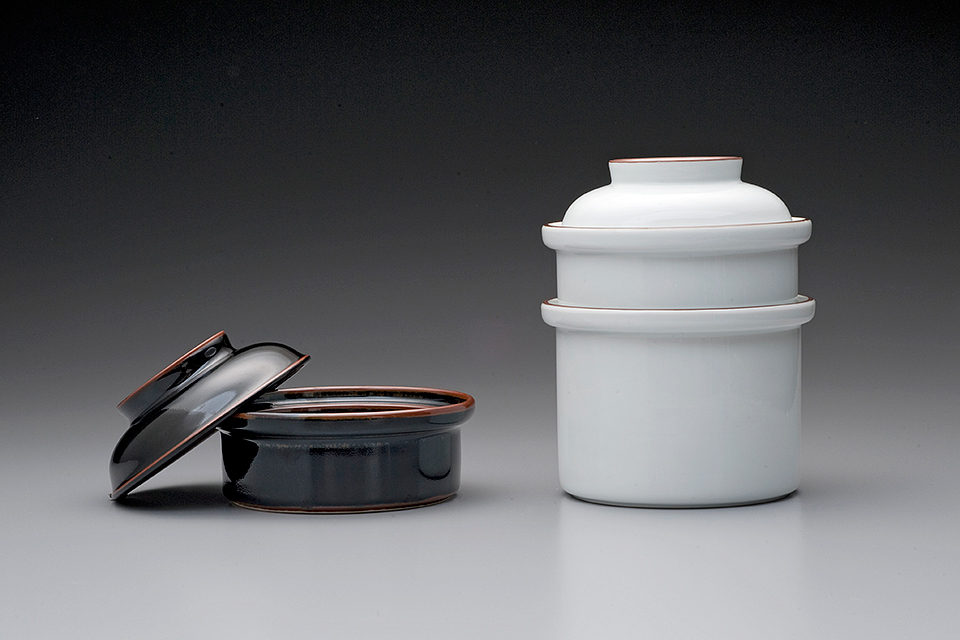
System Bowl (1976)

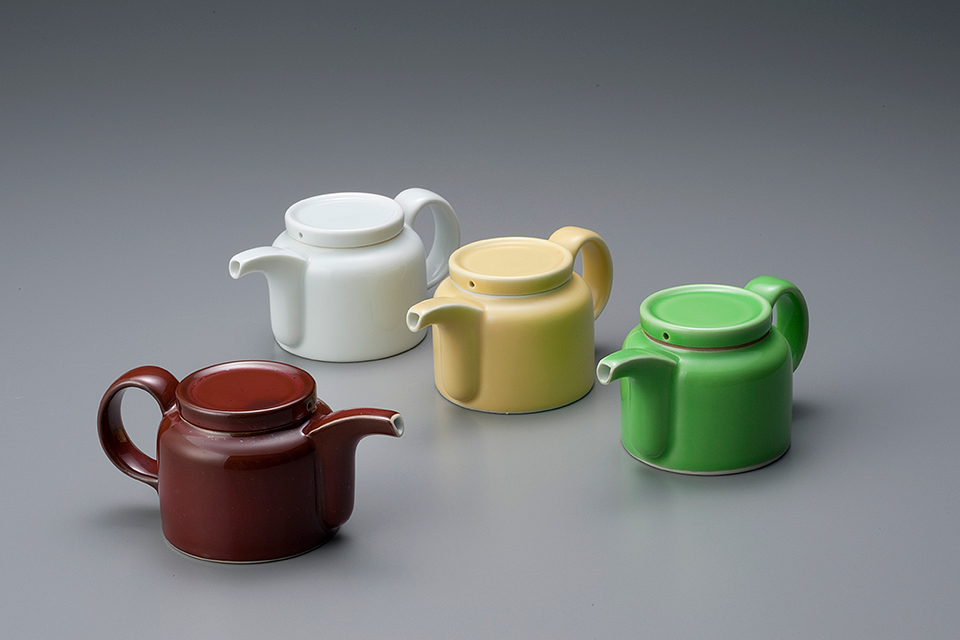
Dressing Pot (1976)

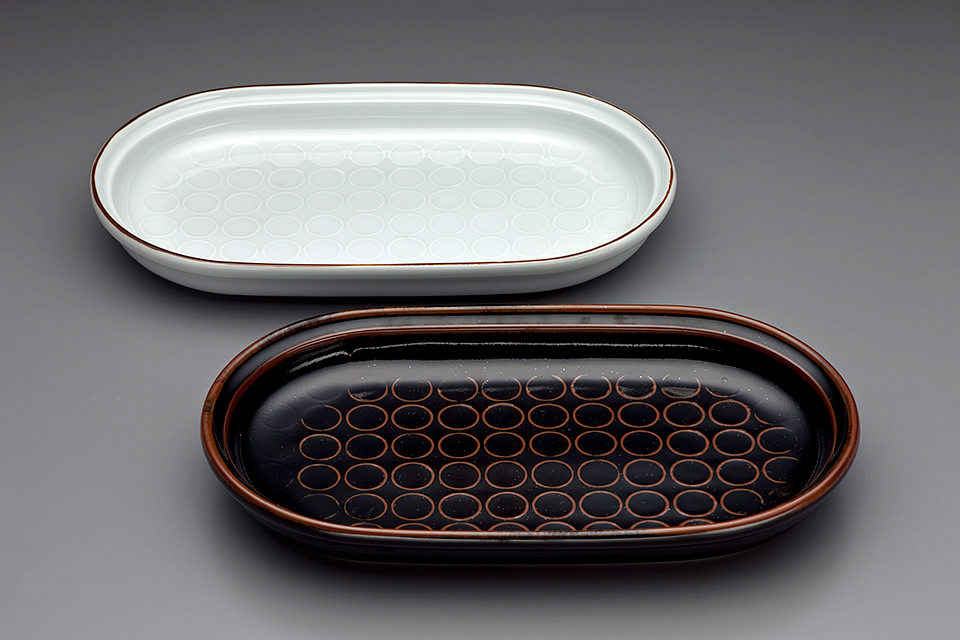
Snack Plate (1976)

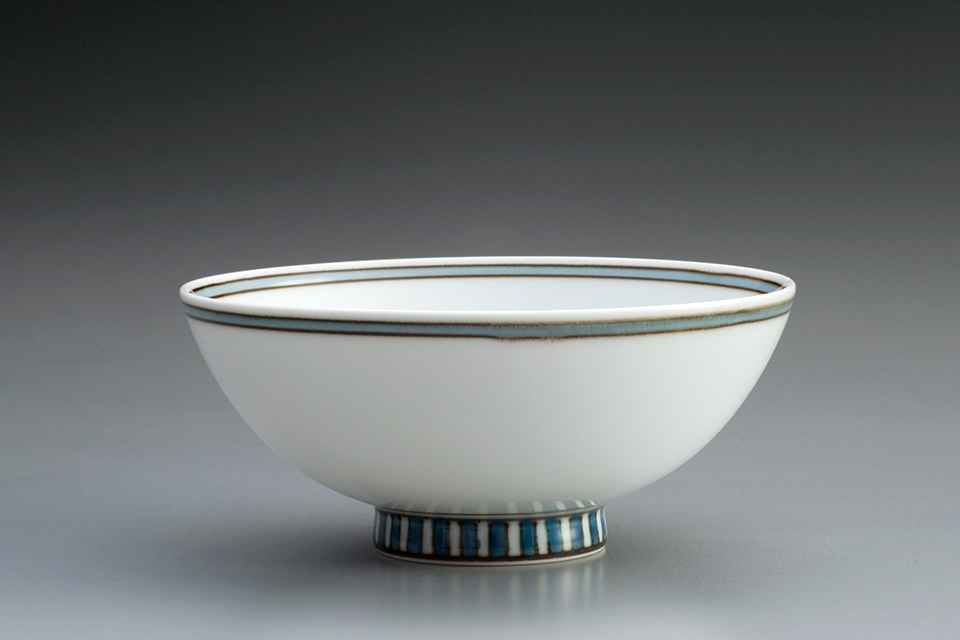
Ricebowl "KINOKAWA" (1977)

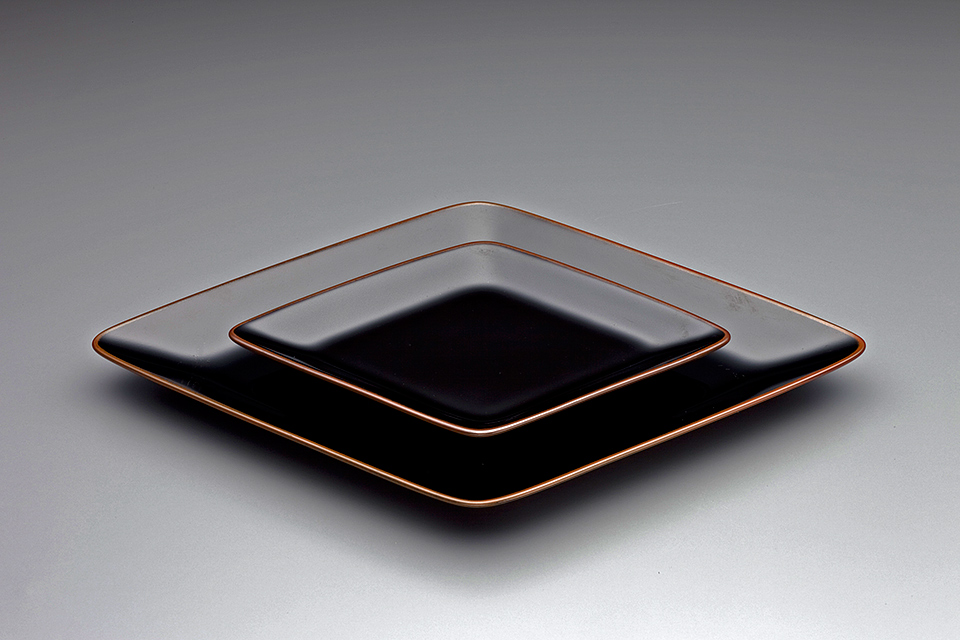
Diamond Shaped Plate (1977)

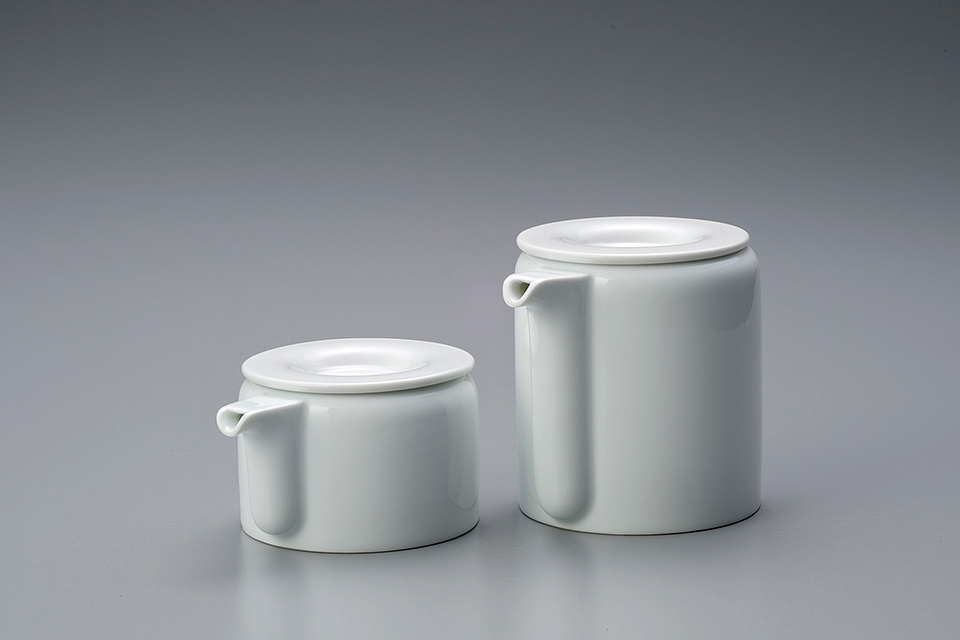
Lidded Lipped Bottle (1977)

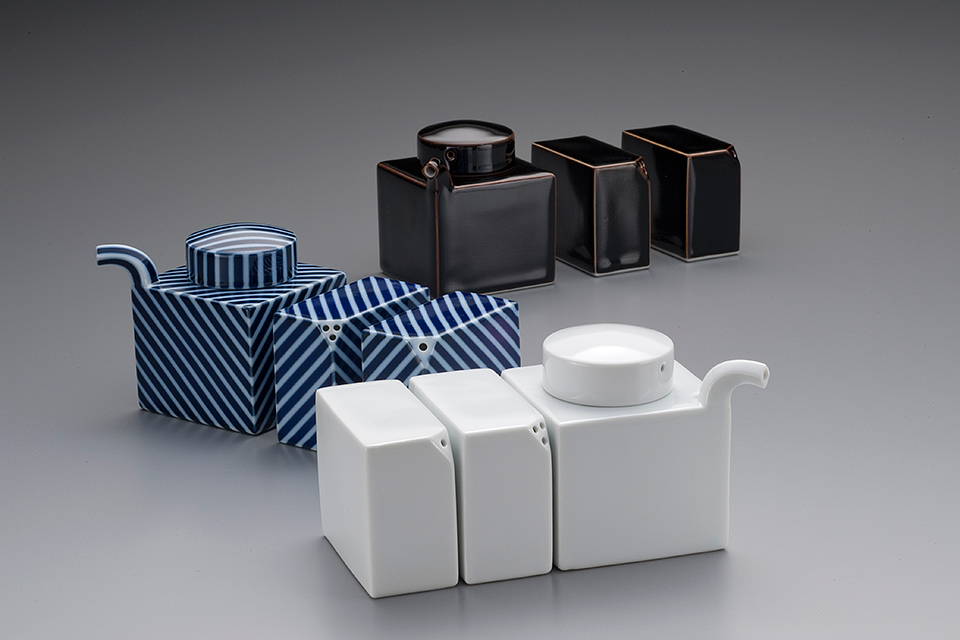
Cubic Seasoning Set (1977)

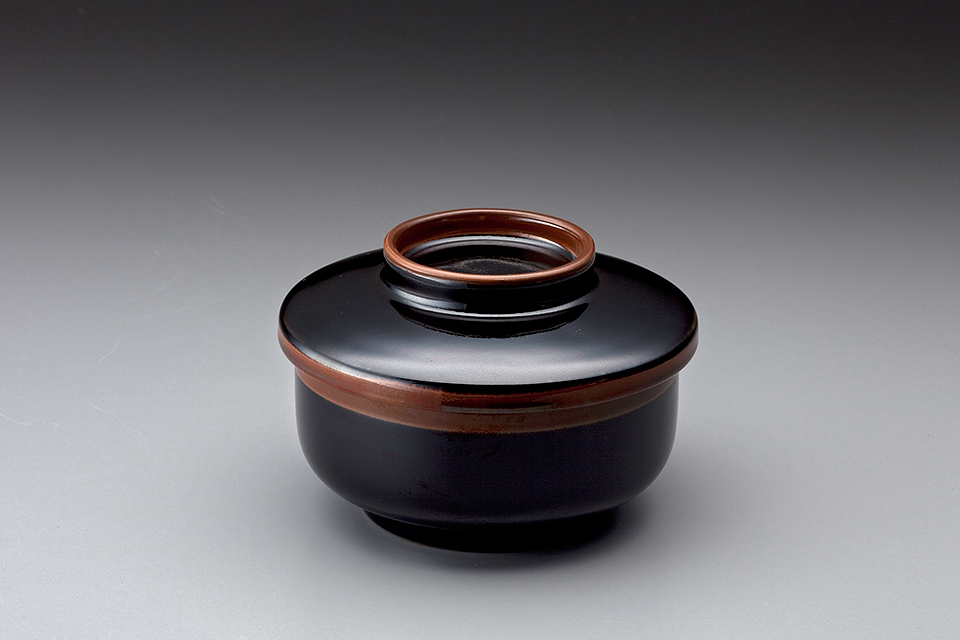
Bowl for boiled (1977)

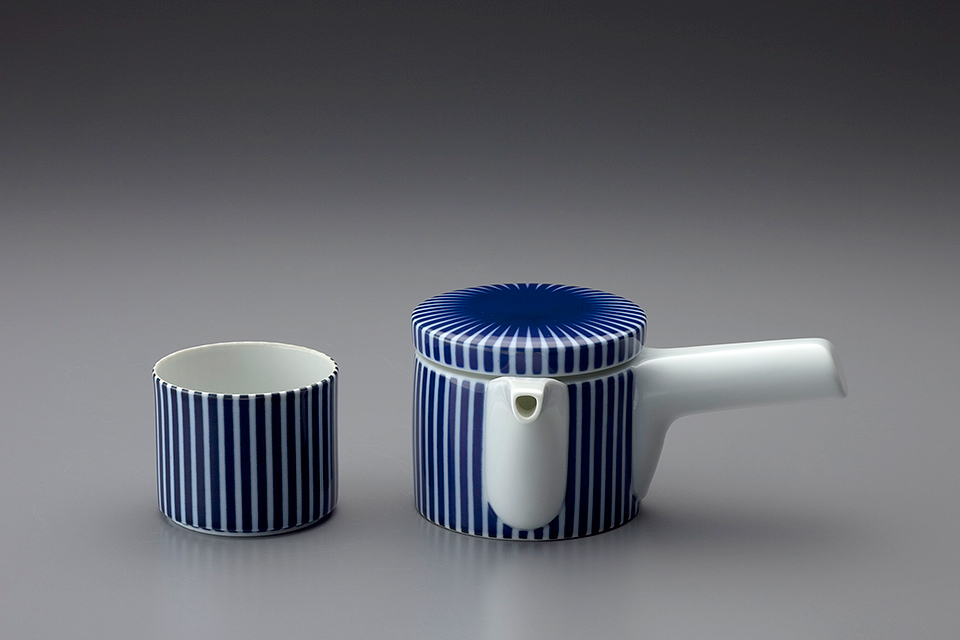
Blue Stripe Tea Set (1977)

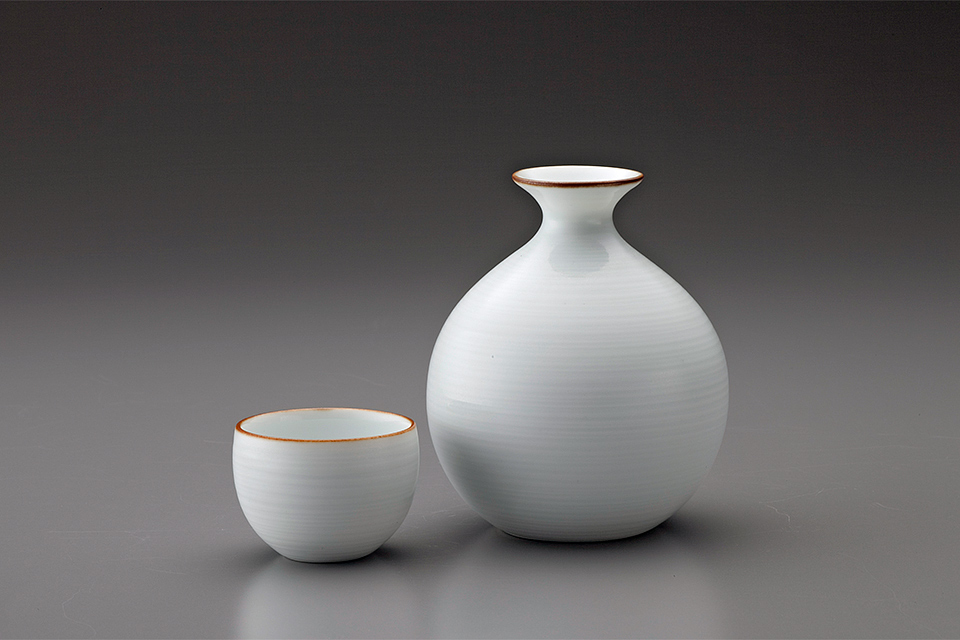
White Strings Ware Round Sake Set (1977)

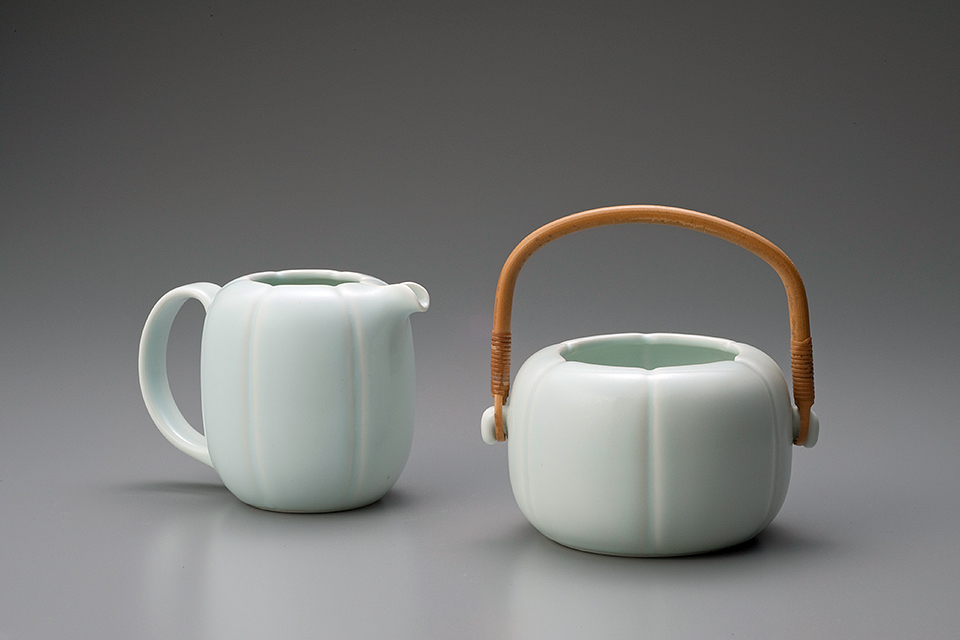
Whisky-and-water Set (1977)

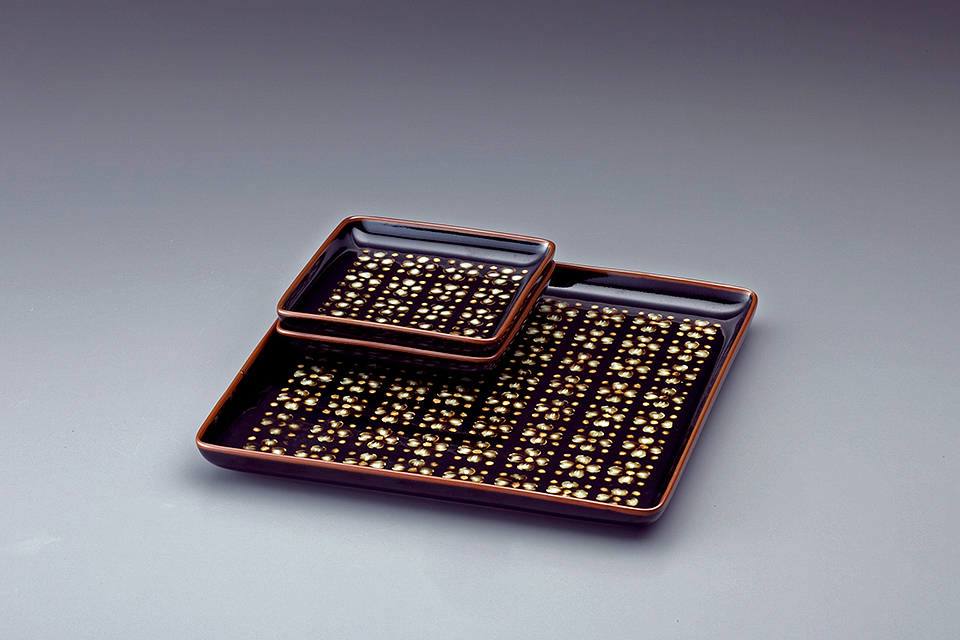
Tenmoku Floral Pattern Square Plate (1978)

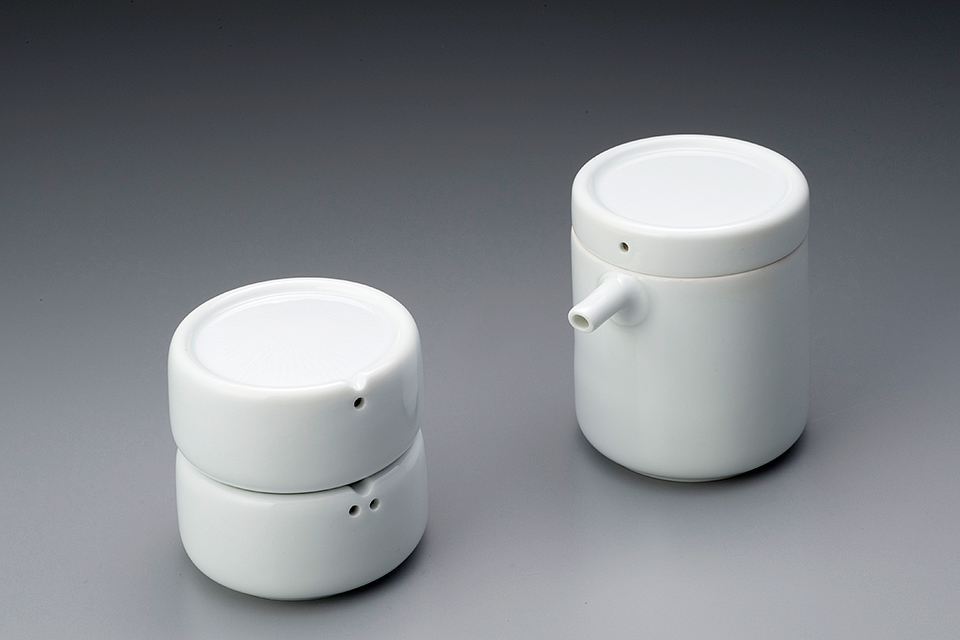
S-type Seasoning Set (1978)

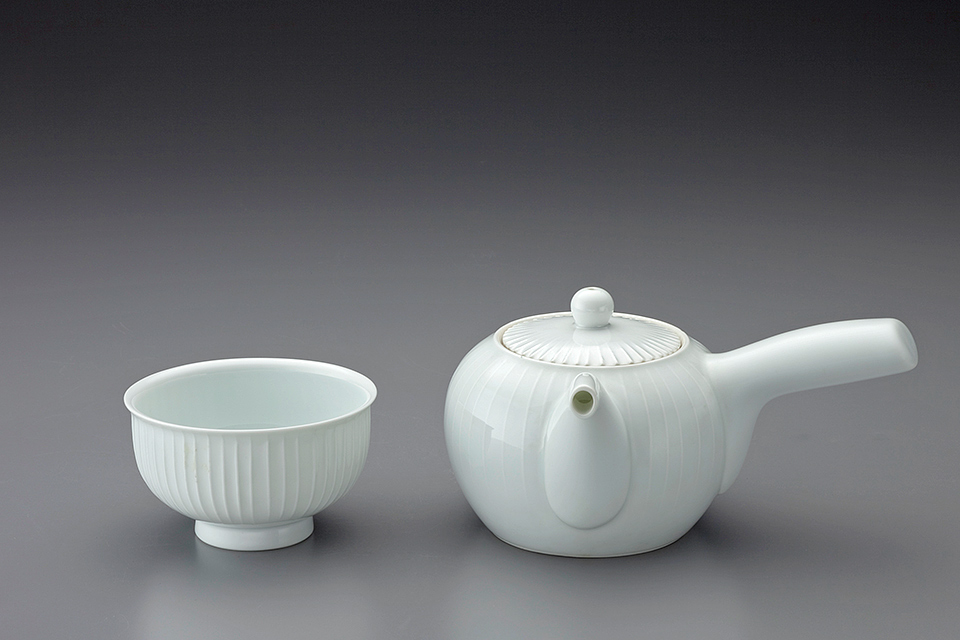
White Line Tea Set (1978)

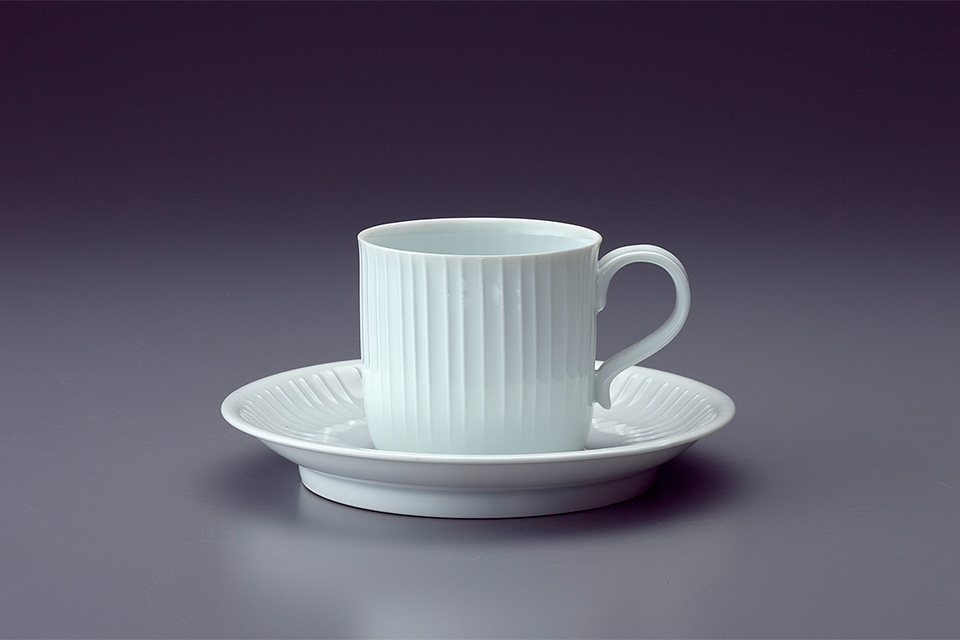
White Line Q-type Coffee Cup (1978)

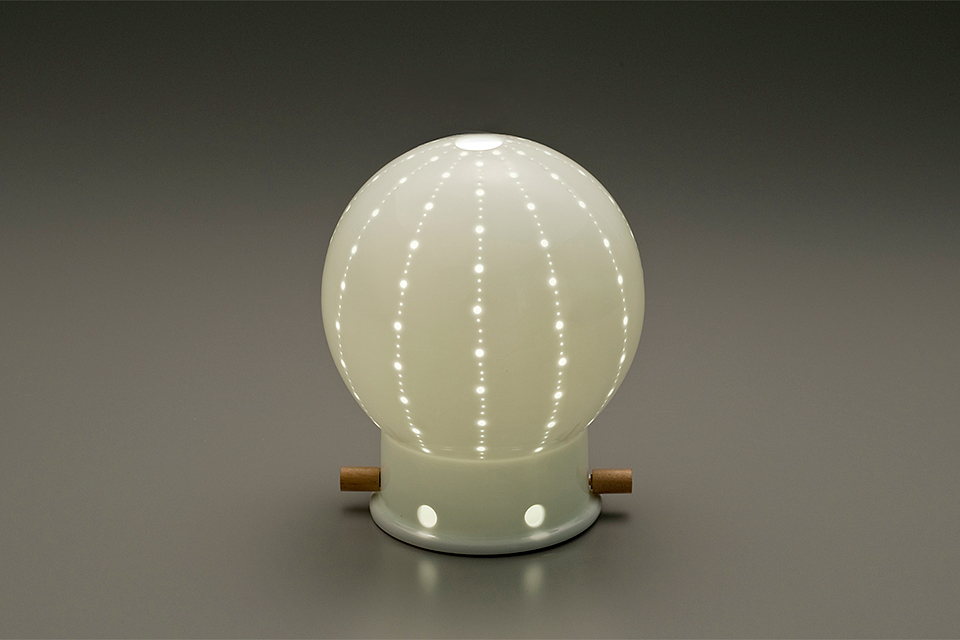
Lighting fixture POSEN A (1978)

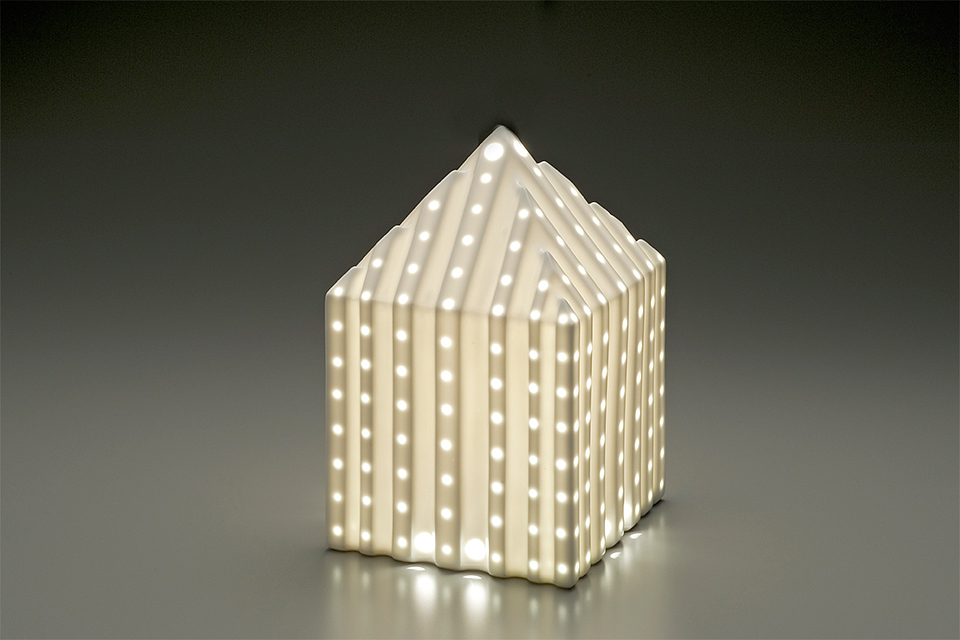
Lighting fixture POSEN B (1978)

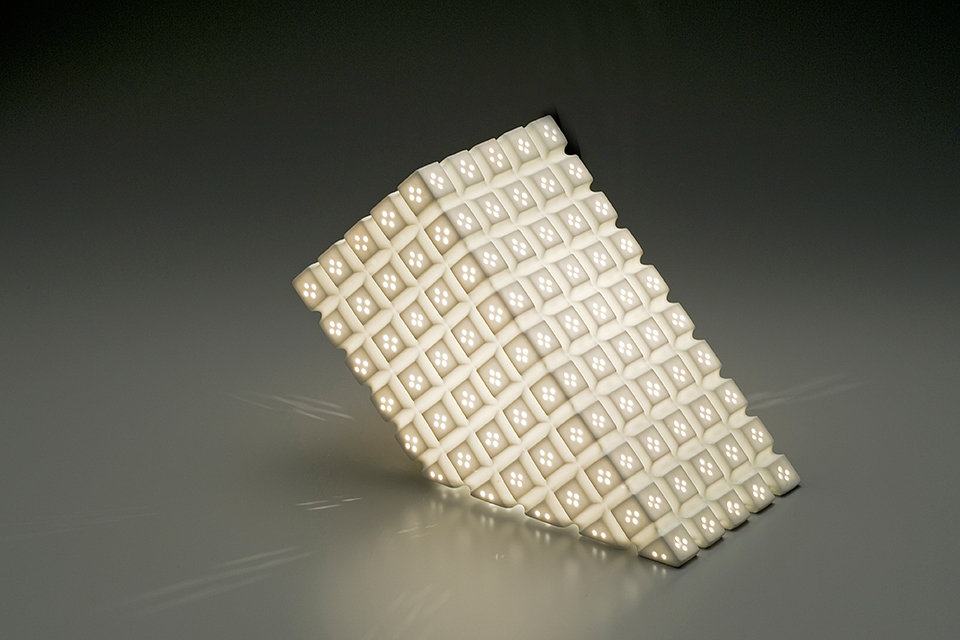
Lighting fixture POSEN C (1978)

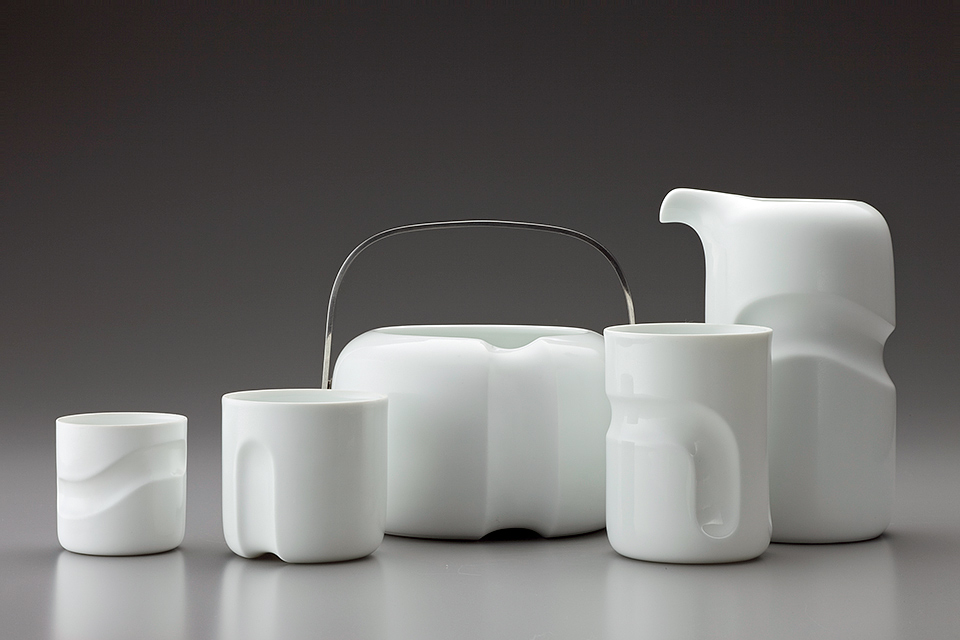
Whisky Set (1978)

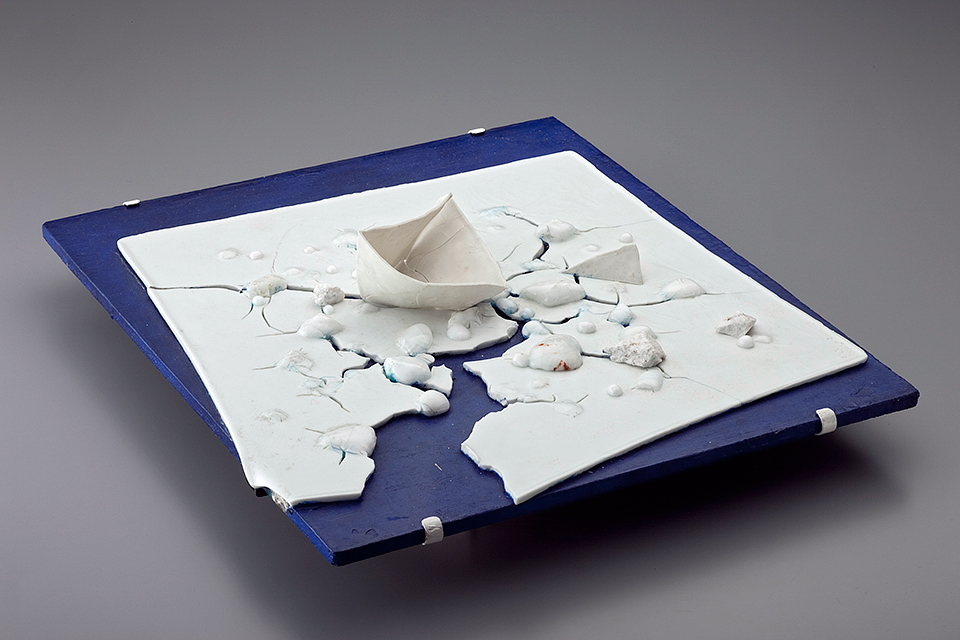
"The Arctic" (1978)

=== In the 1980s ===
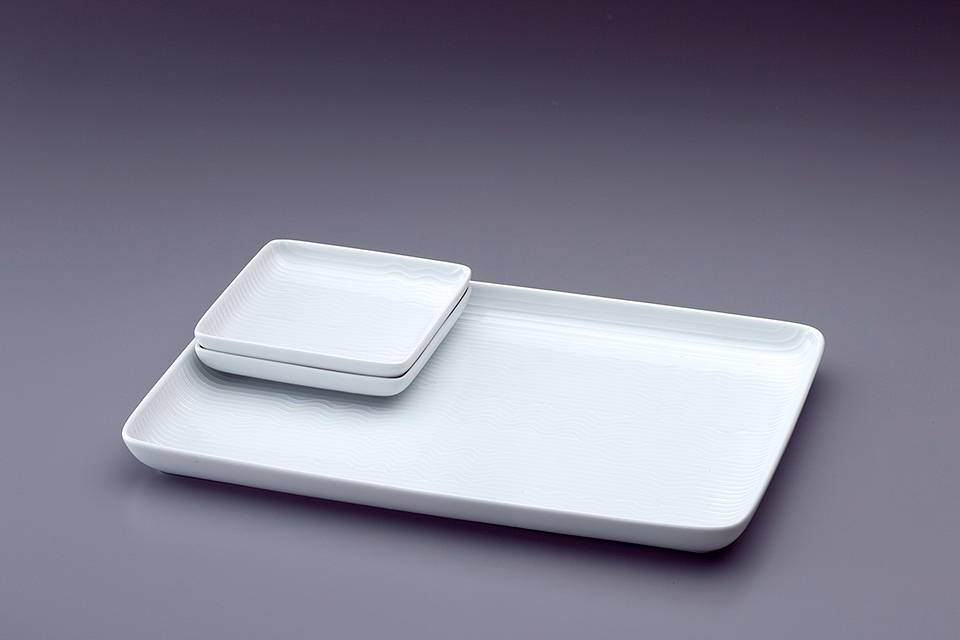
Square Plate "Babbling stream" (1980)

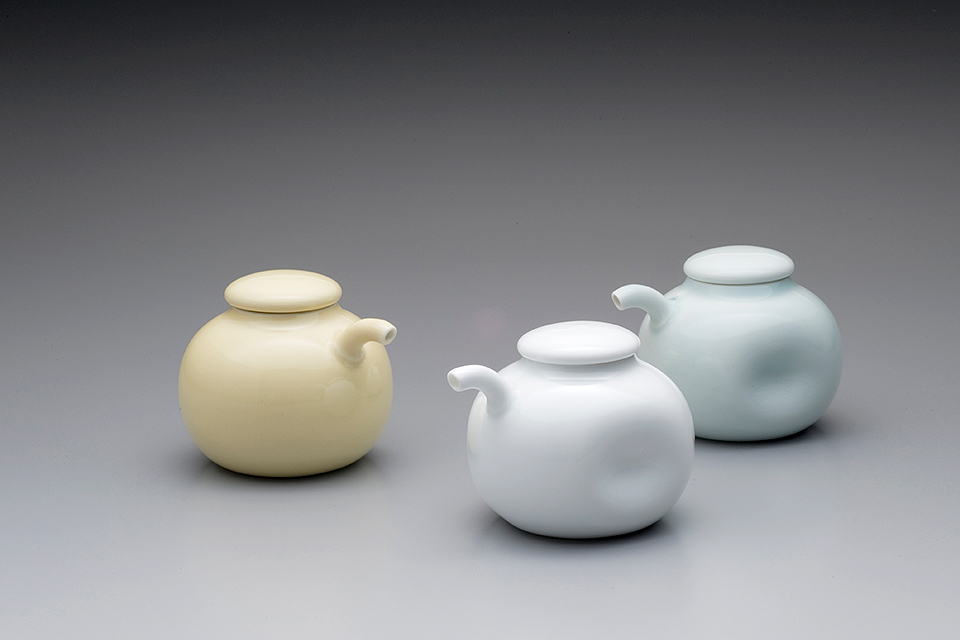
Soy Sauce Bottle "Dimple" (1980)

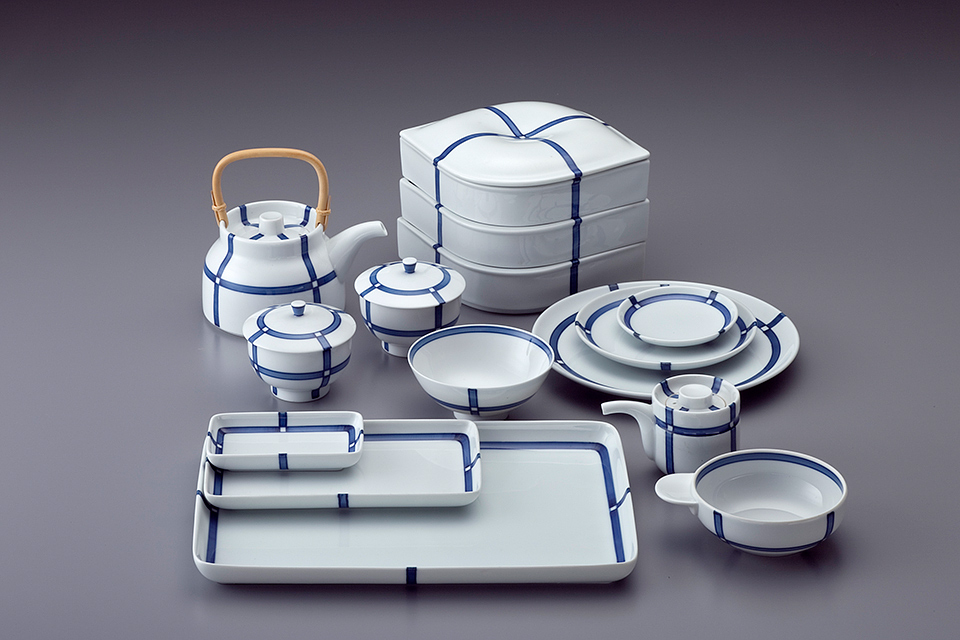
Blue Composition series (1980)

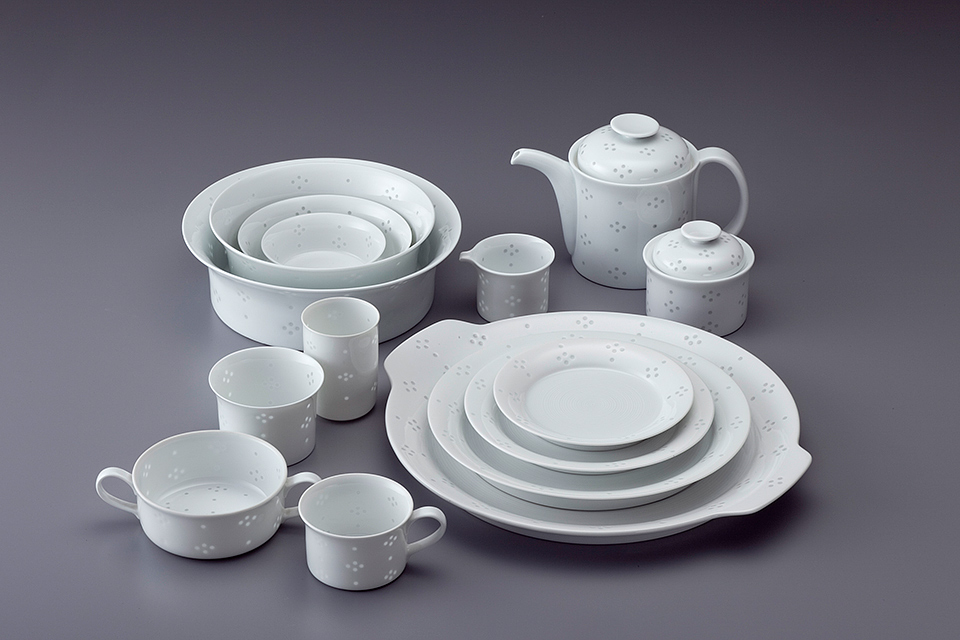
Star flowers like firefly series (1980)

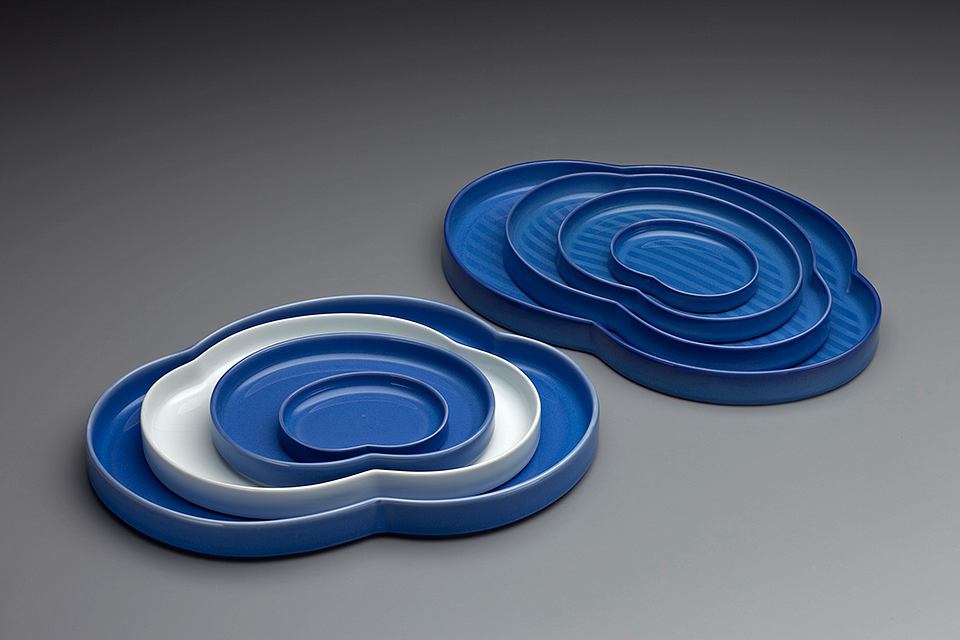
Free Plate, Free Plate Stripe (1981)

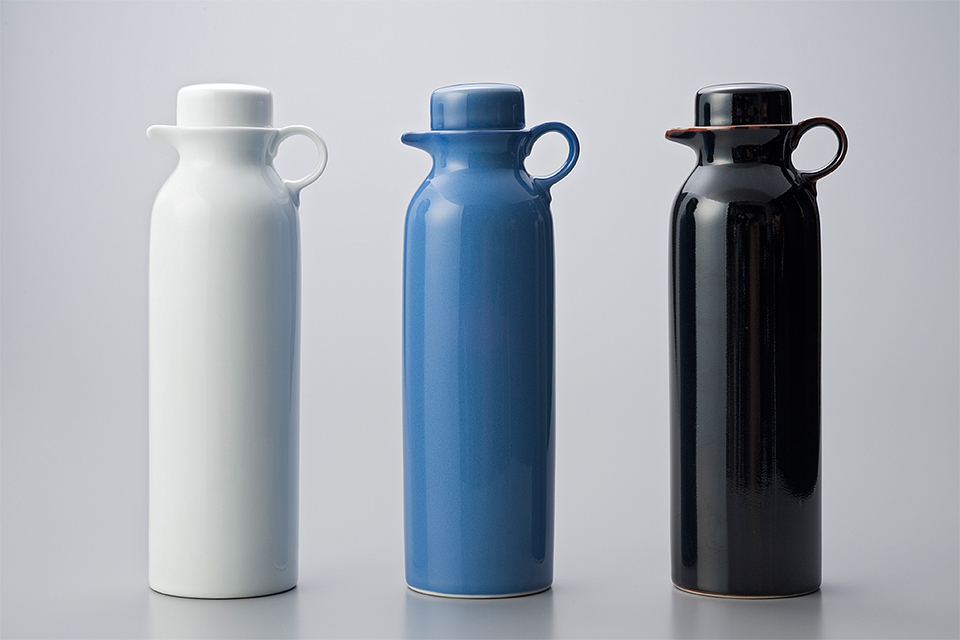
Pitcher (1981)

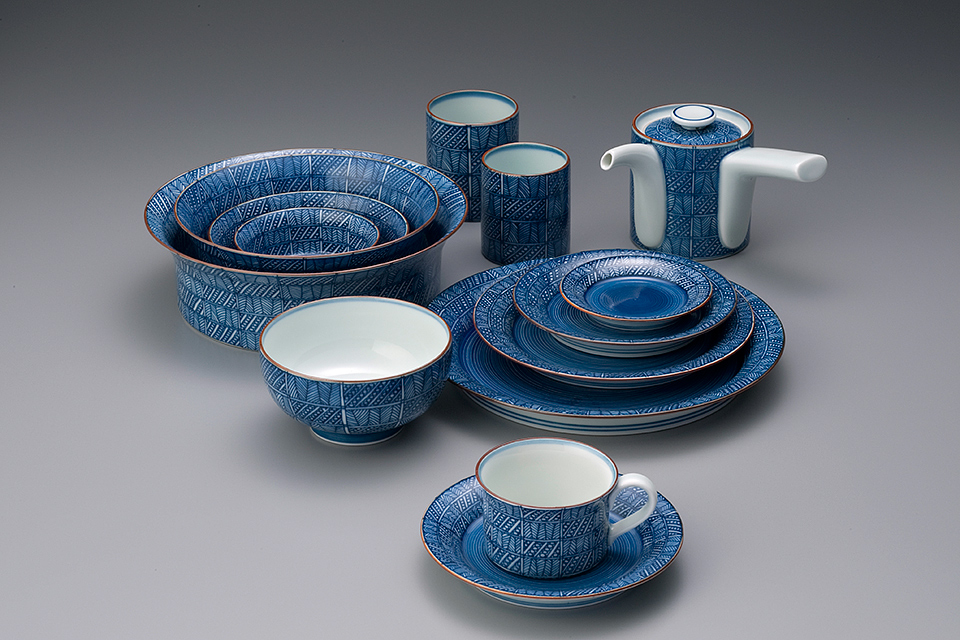
Print Weave series (1981)

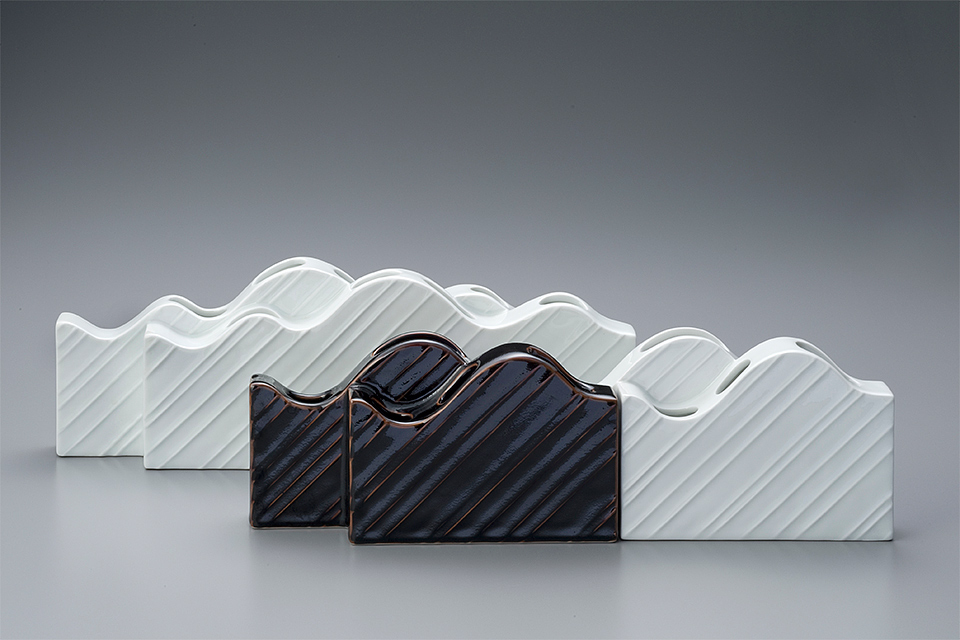
Waving Shaped Vase (1981)

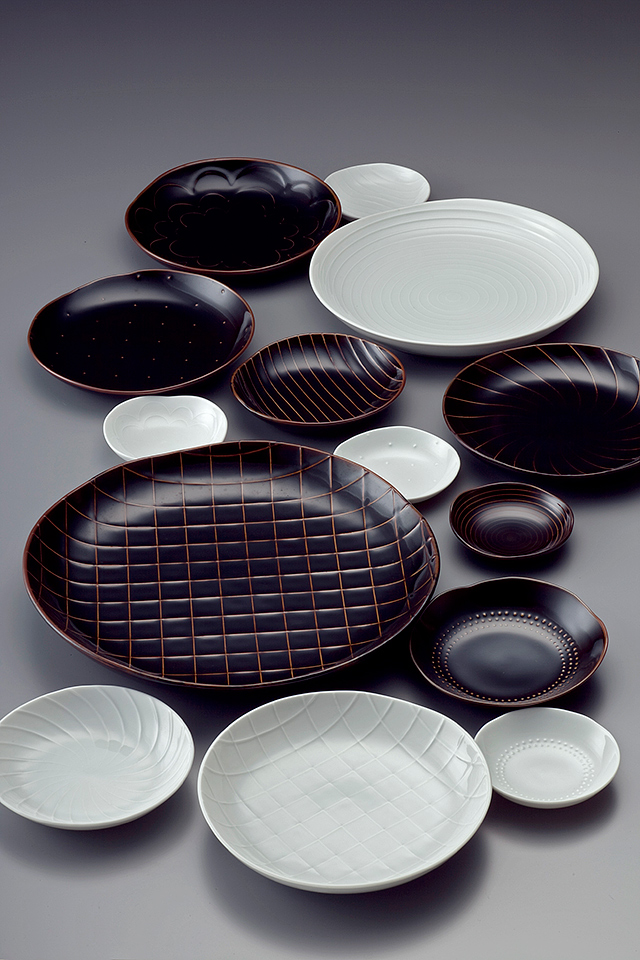
Shell Plate (1982)

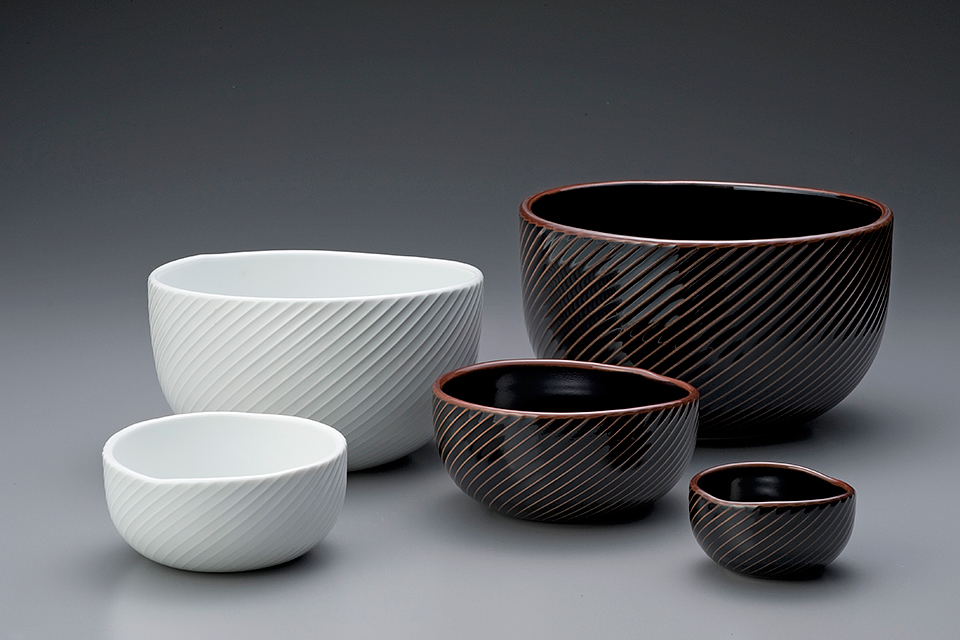
Shell Bowl (1982)

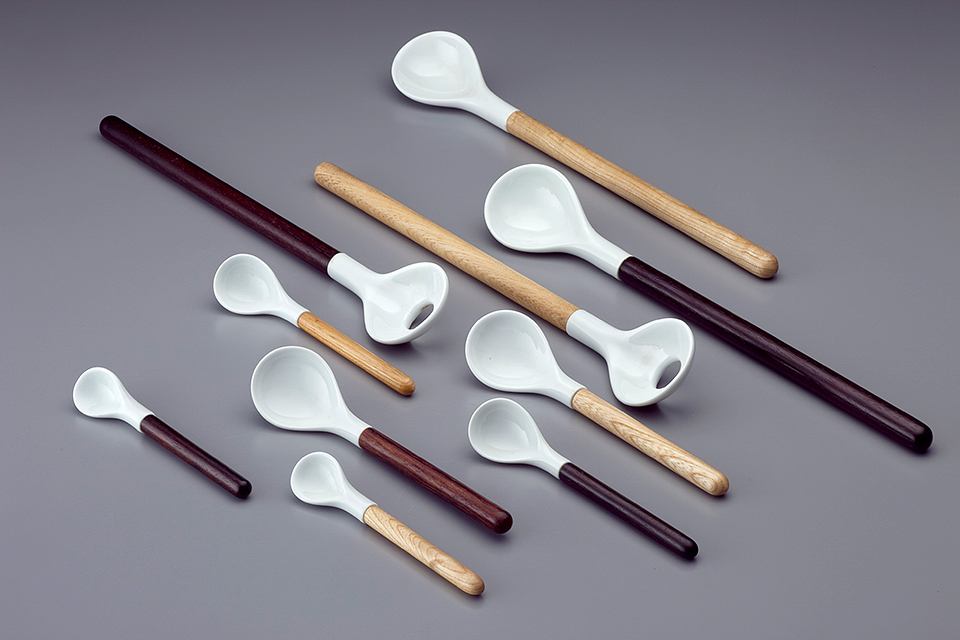
Serving Spoon, Spoon (1982)

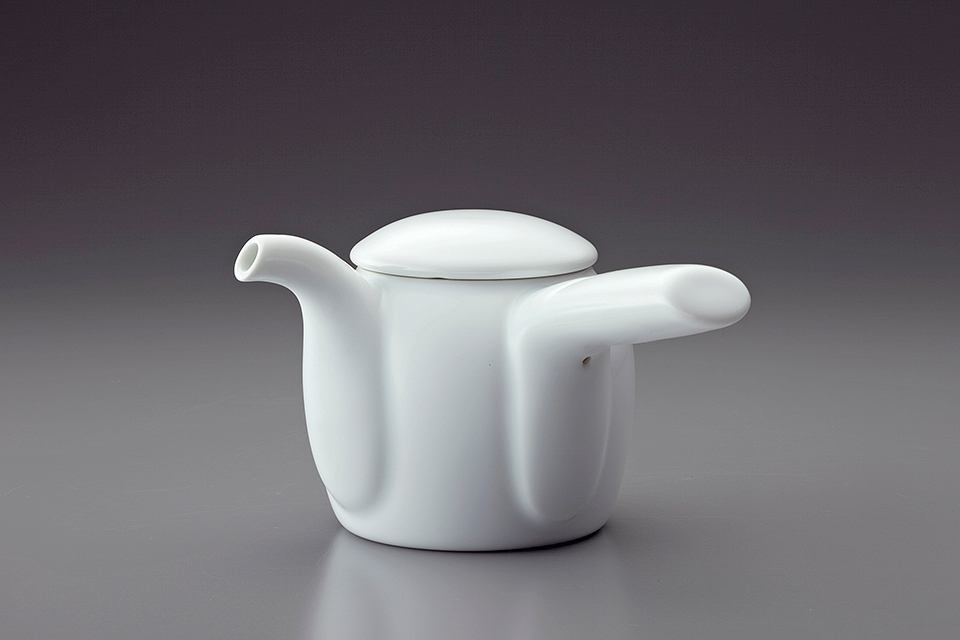
O-type Teapot (1983)

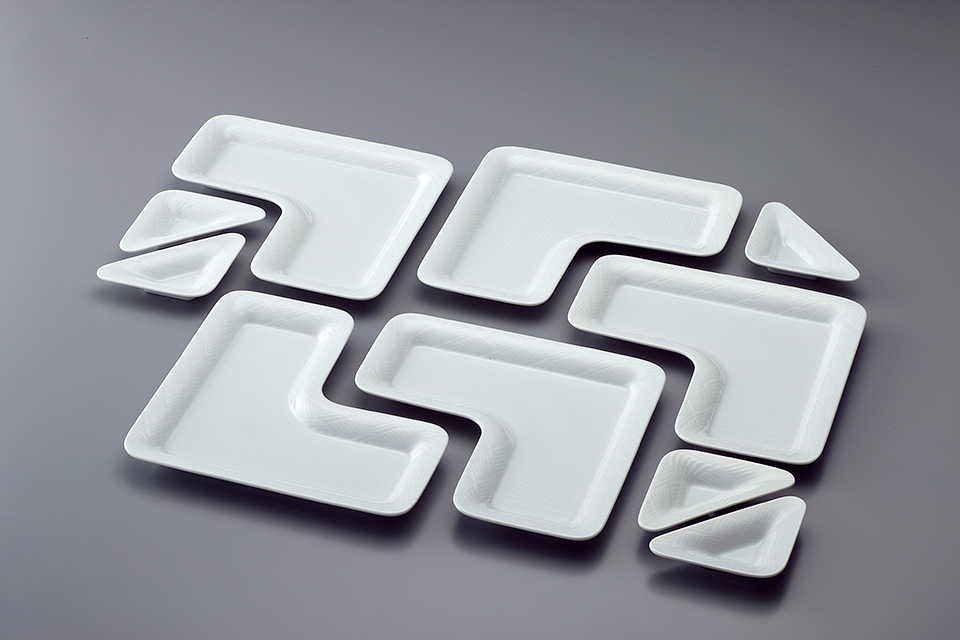
Ripples L-type Party Tray (1983)

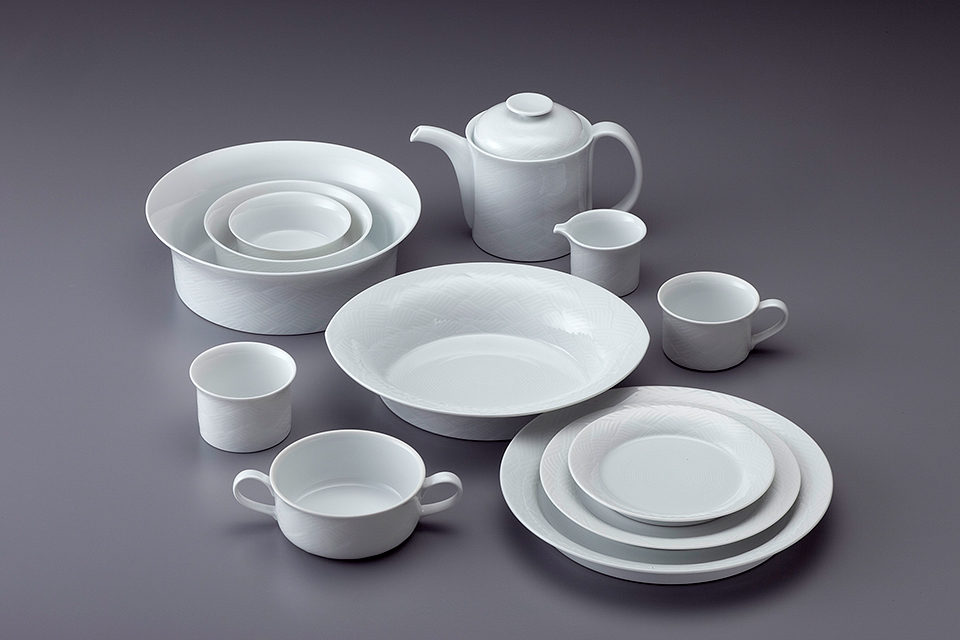
Ripples series (1983)

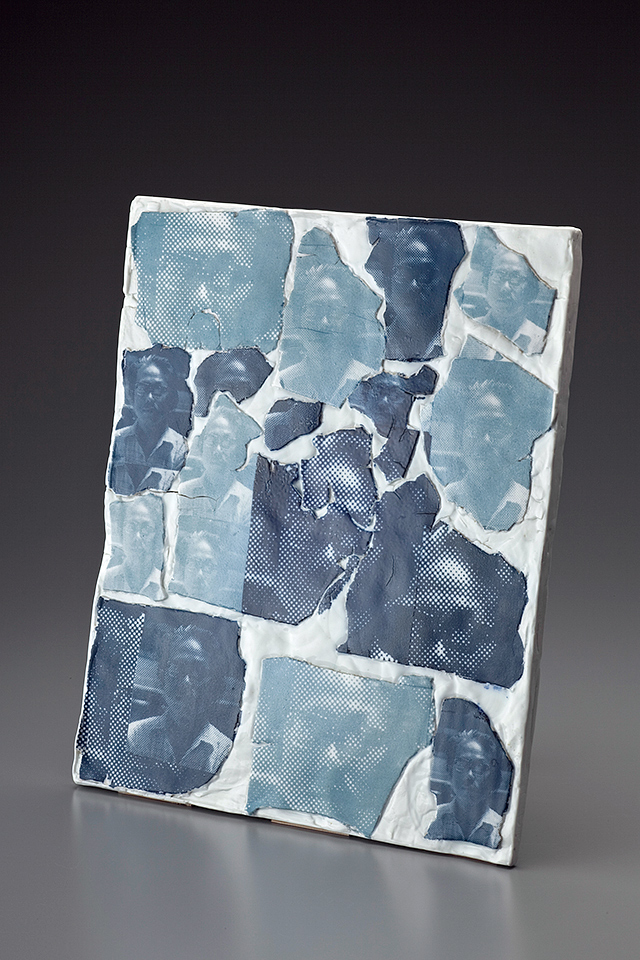
Self-portrait Tile (1983)

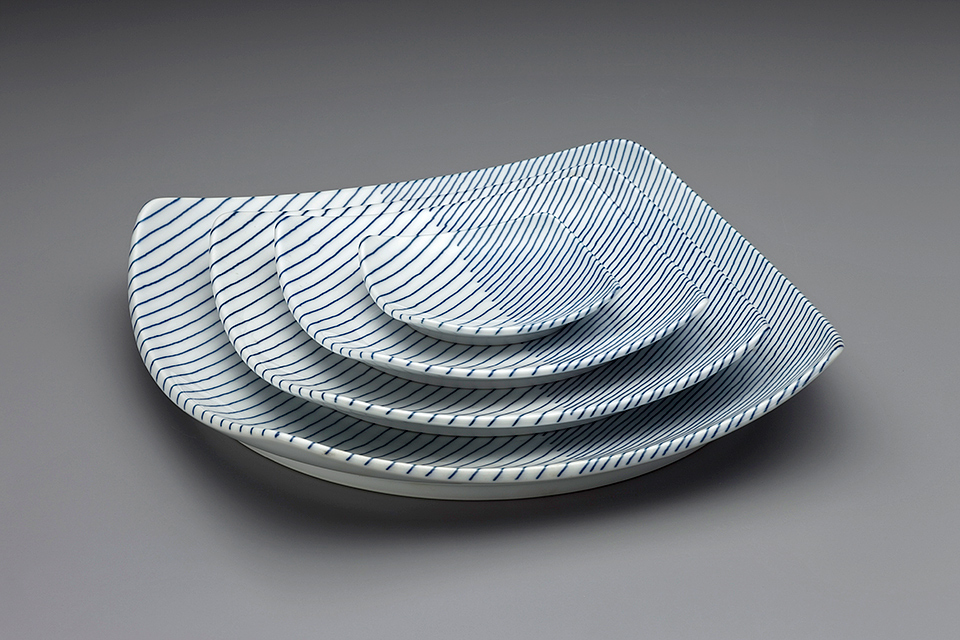
Double Stripe Square Plate (1984)

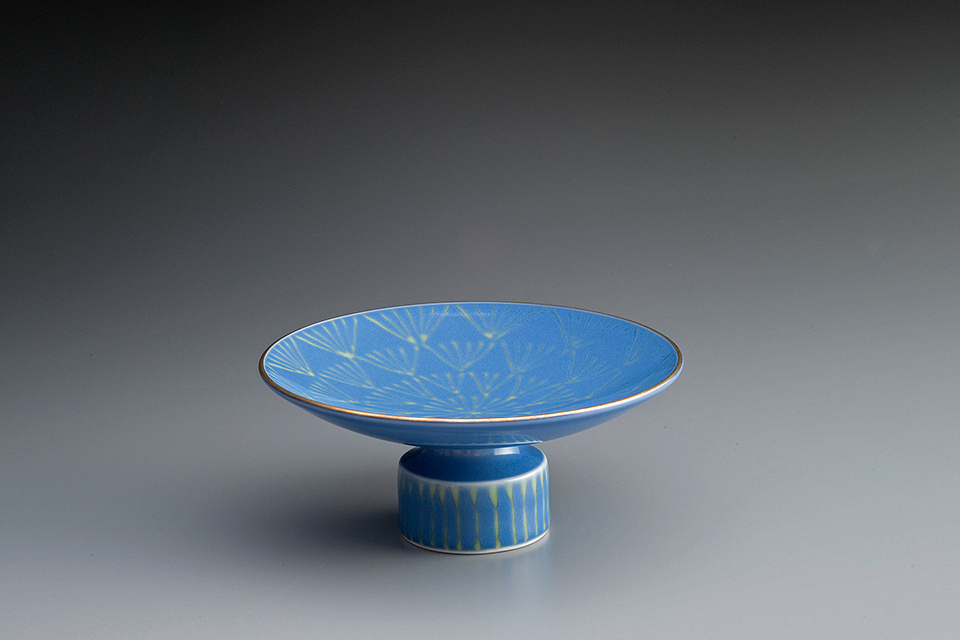
Plate with Tall Foot (1984)

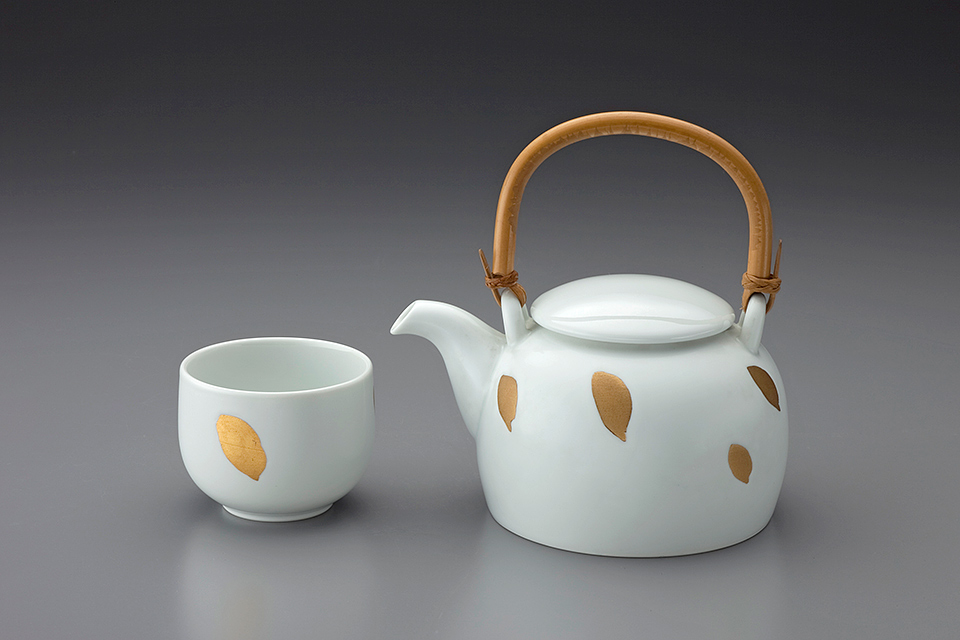
O-type Tea Set "Golden Splash" (1984)

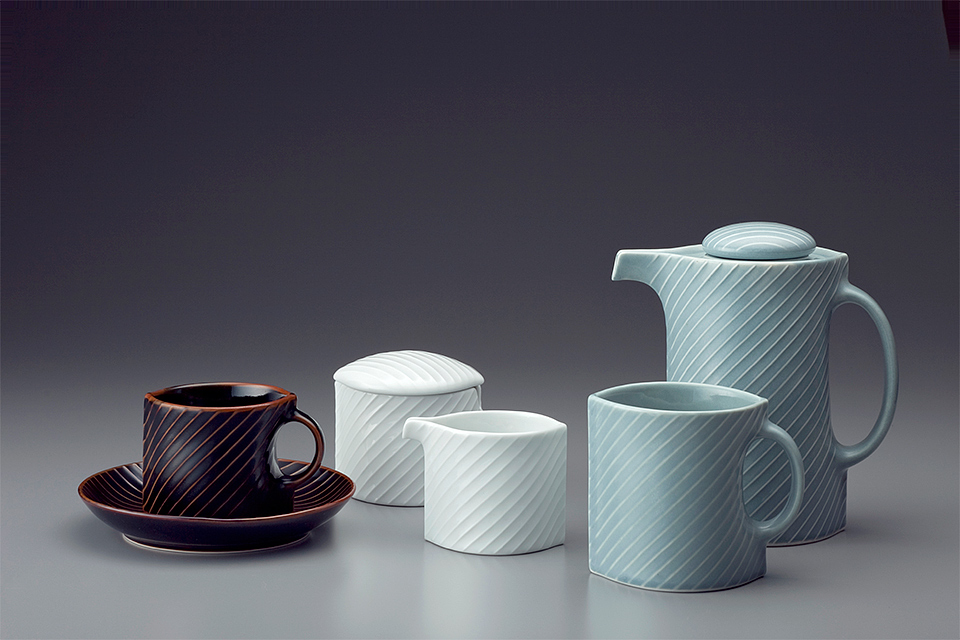
Shell Coffee Set, Mug (1984)

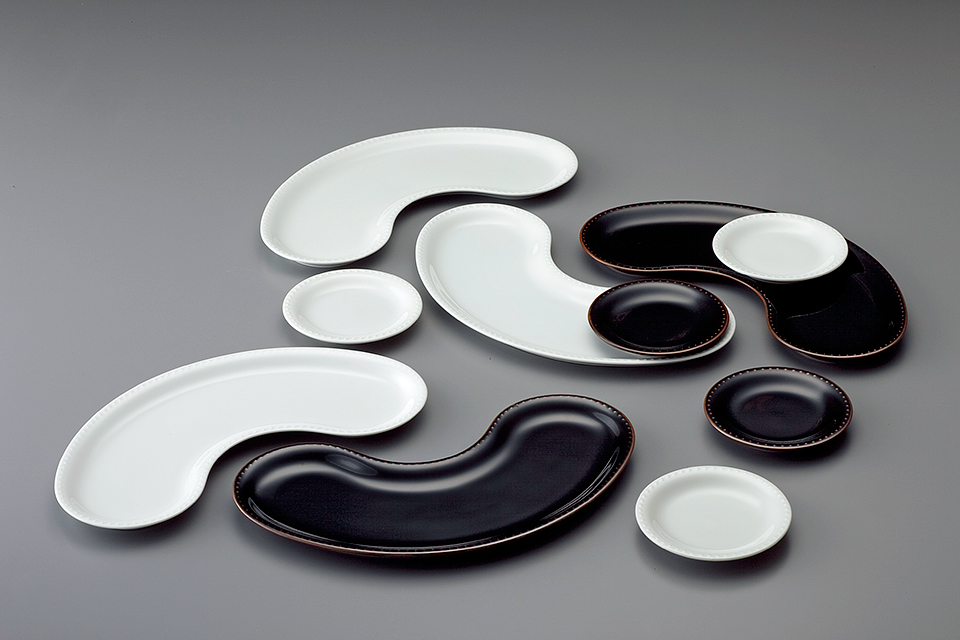
O-type Party Tray (1984)

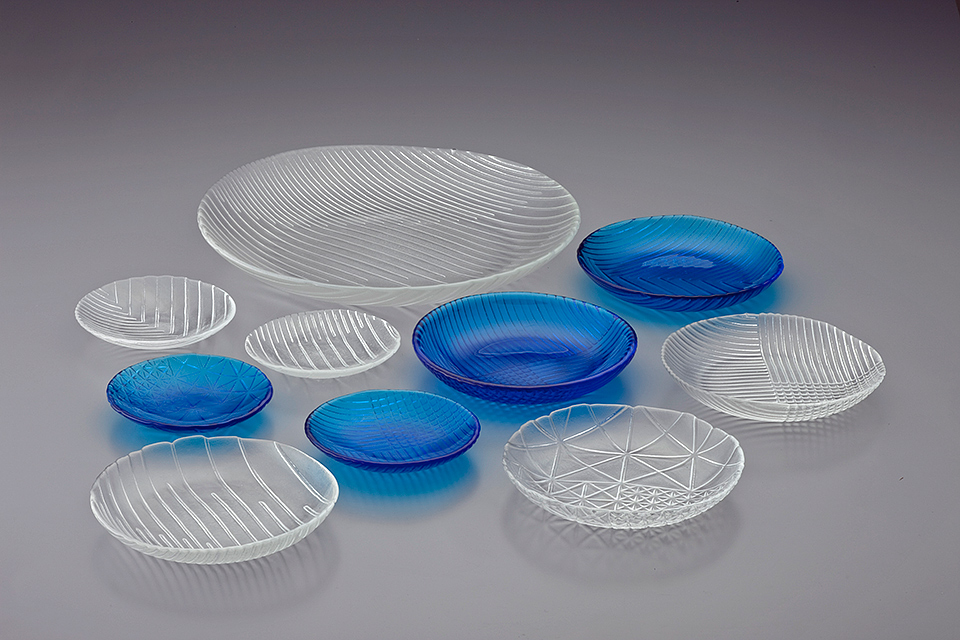
HR-type Glassware (1985)

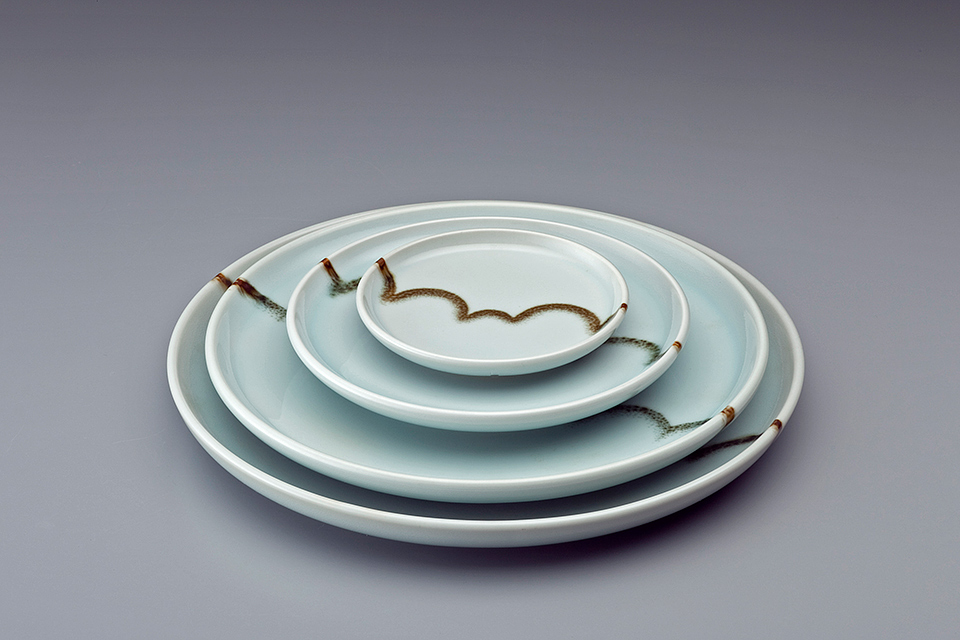
Stoneware K-type / Dish (1985)

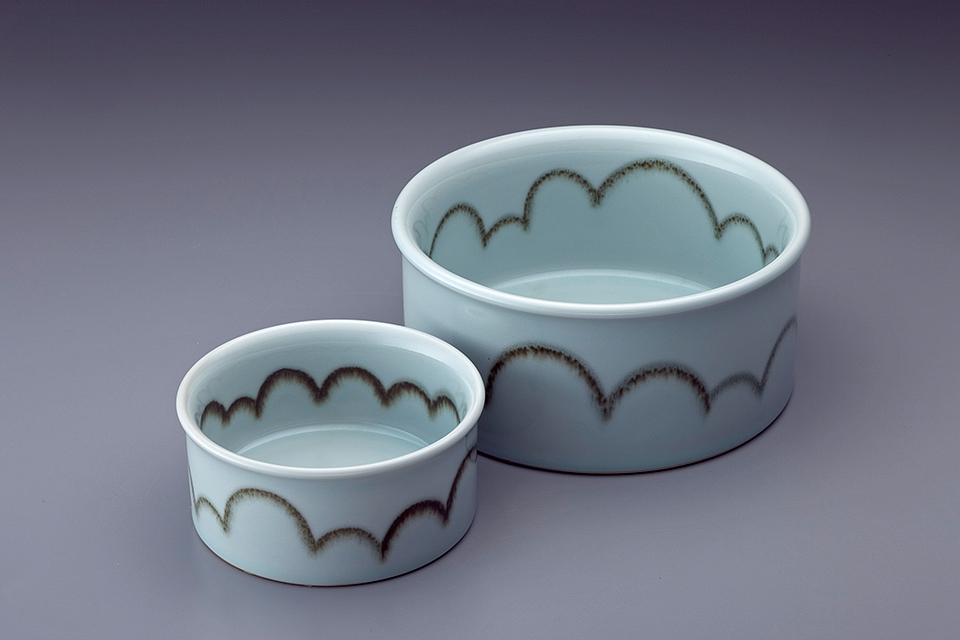
Stoneware K-type / Bowl (1985)

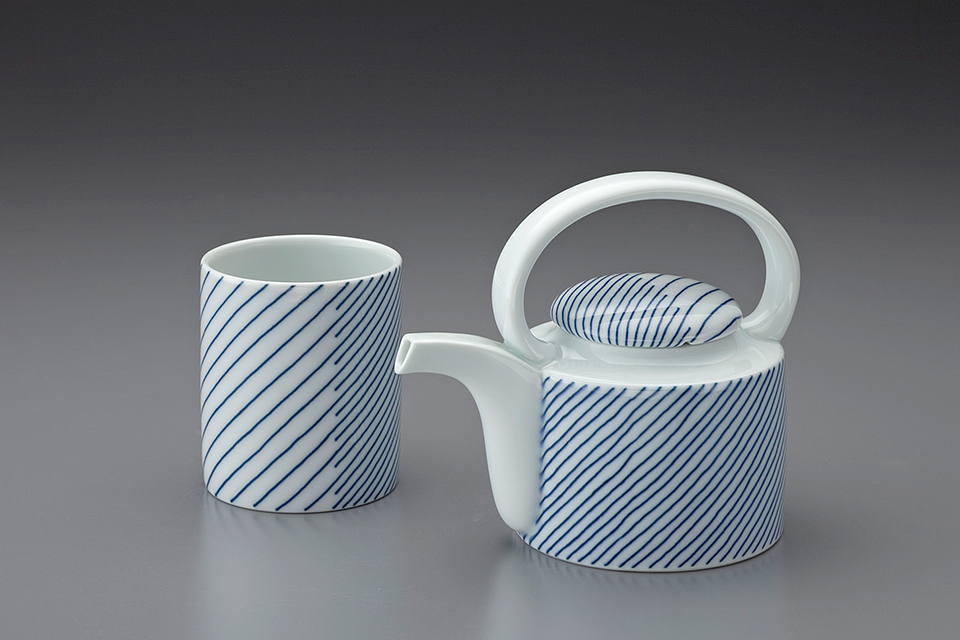
Double Stripe Square Tea Set (1985)

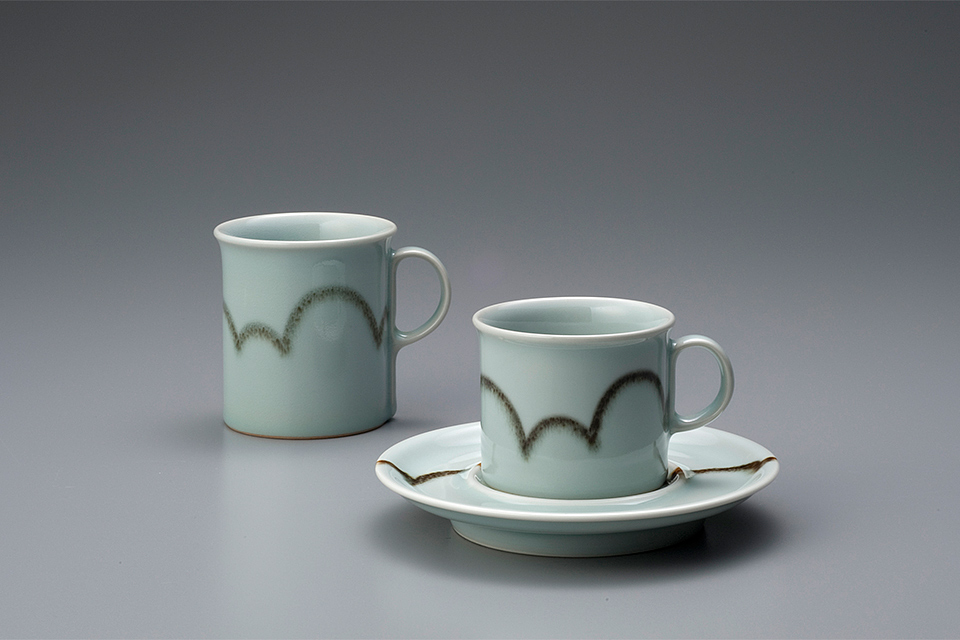
Stoneware K-type Coffee Cup, Mug (1985),

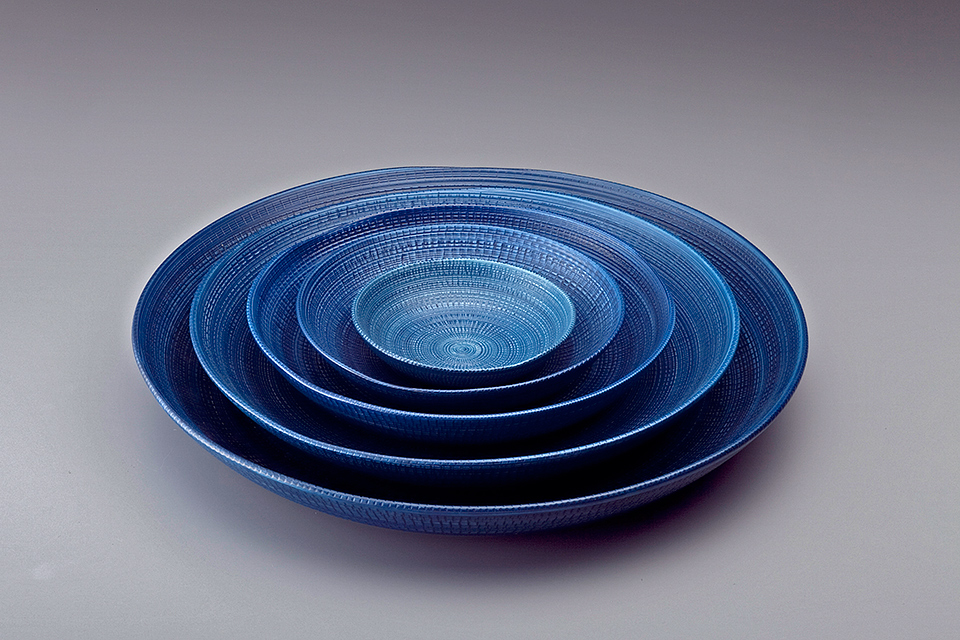
Shell series "Eddying Current" / Dish (1987)

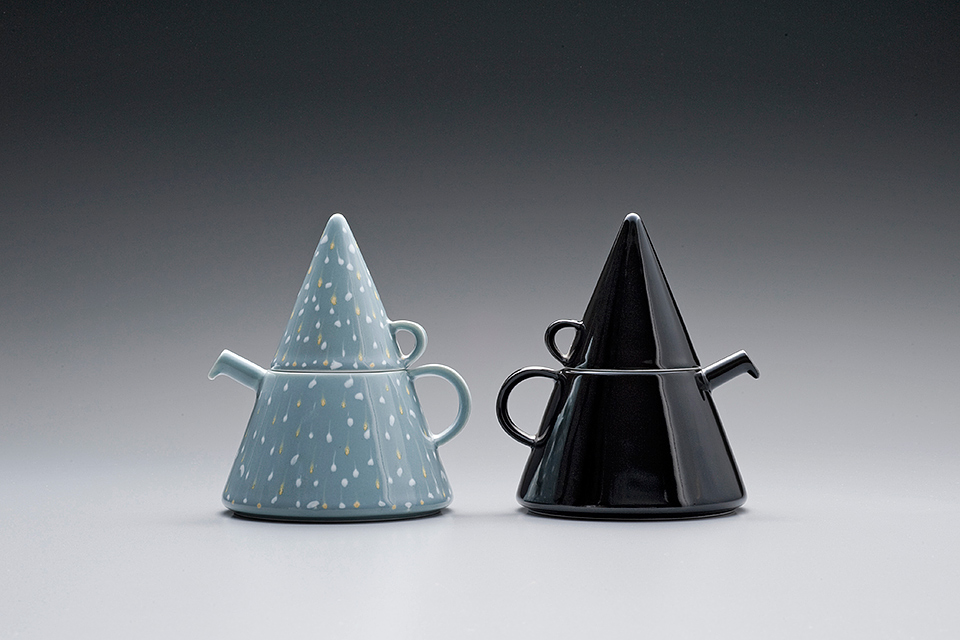
A-type Soy Sauce Bottle (1987)

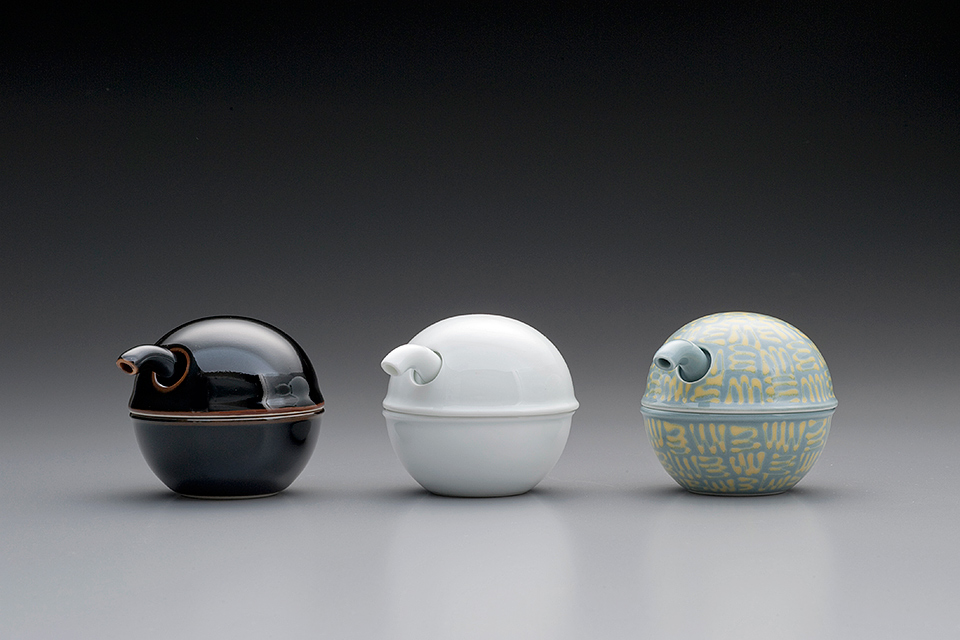
C-type Soy Sauce Bottle (1987)

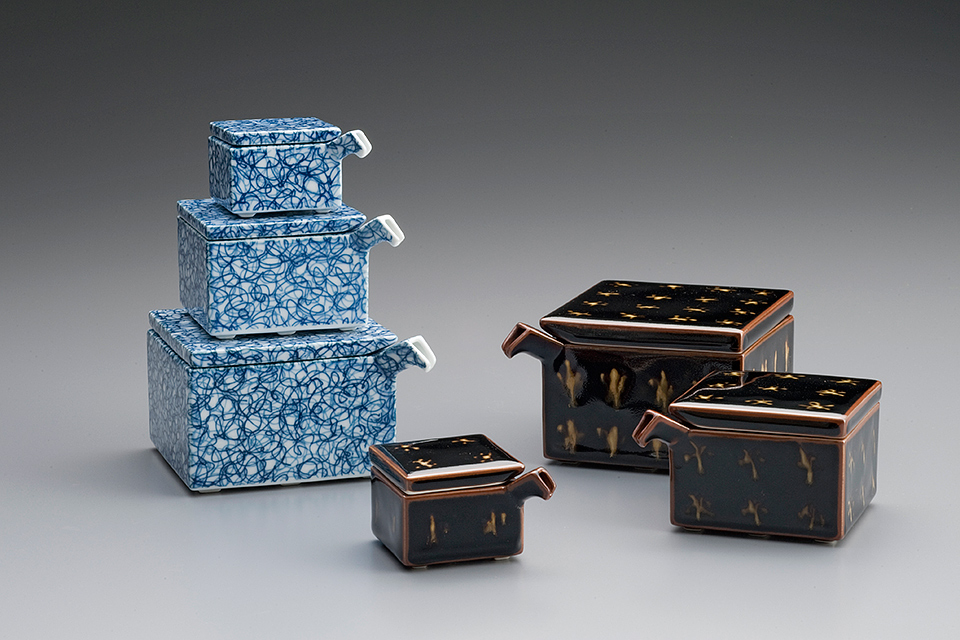
D-type Soy Sauce Bottle (1987)

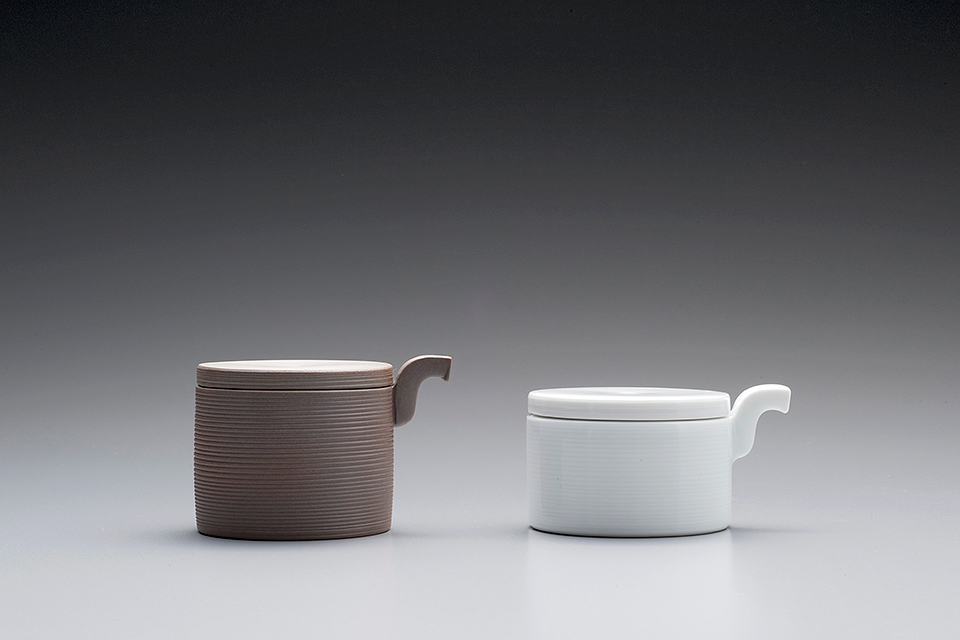
E-type Soy Sauce Bottle (1987)

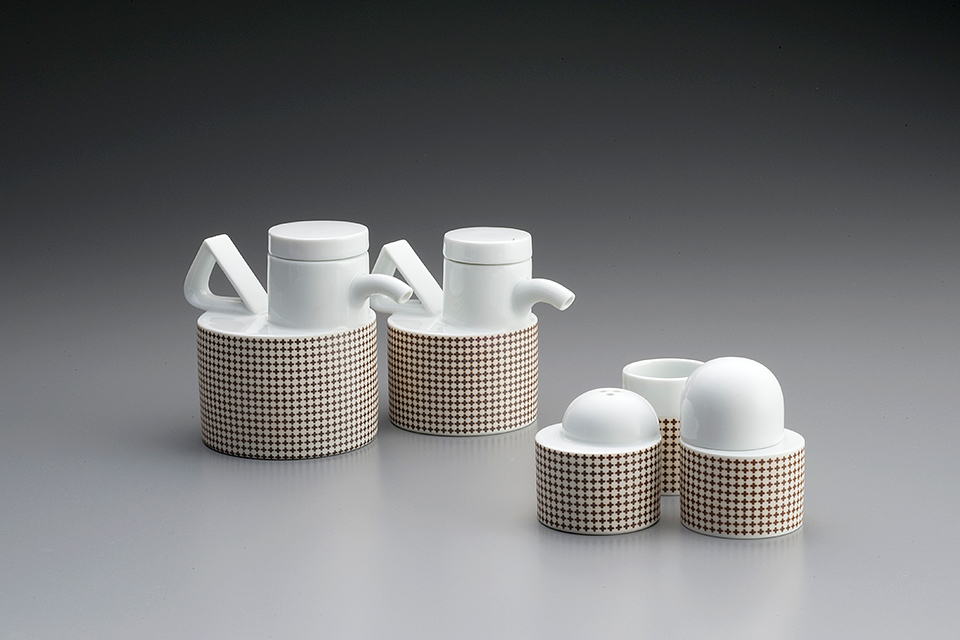
H-type Seasoning Set (1987)

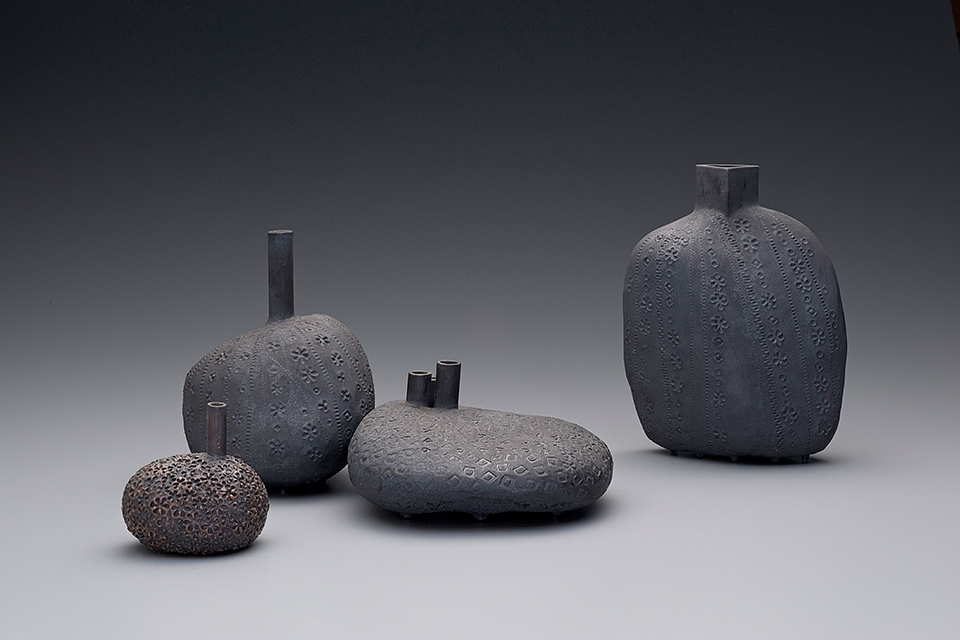
Vase "Material" (1987)

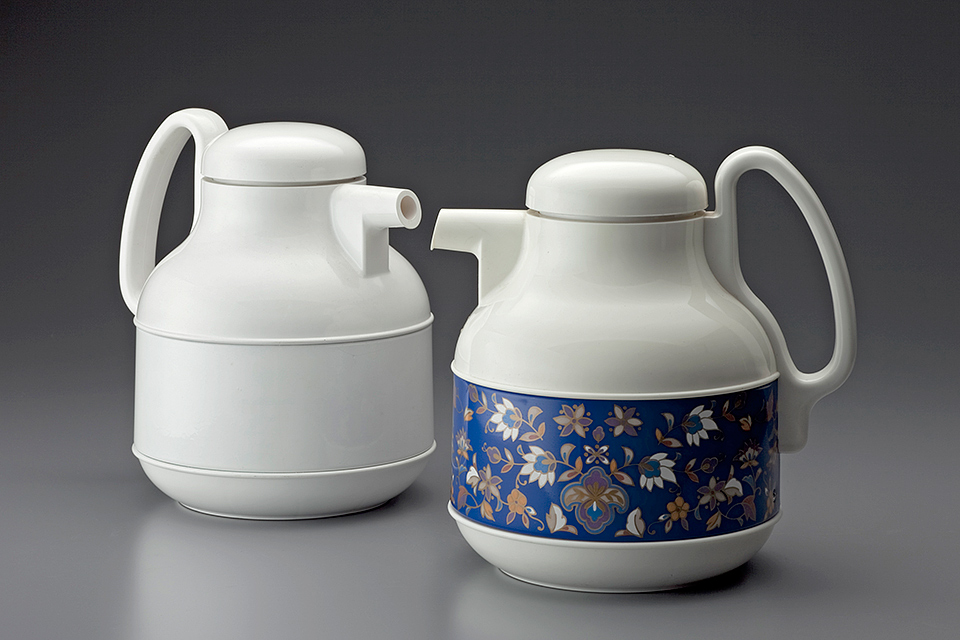
Thermos Jug (1988)

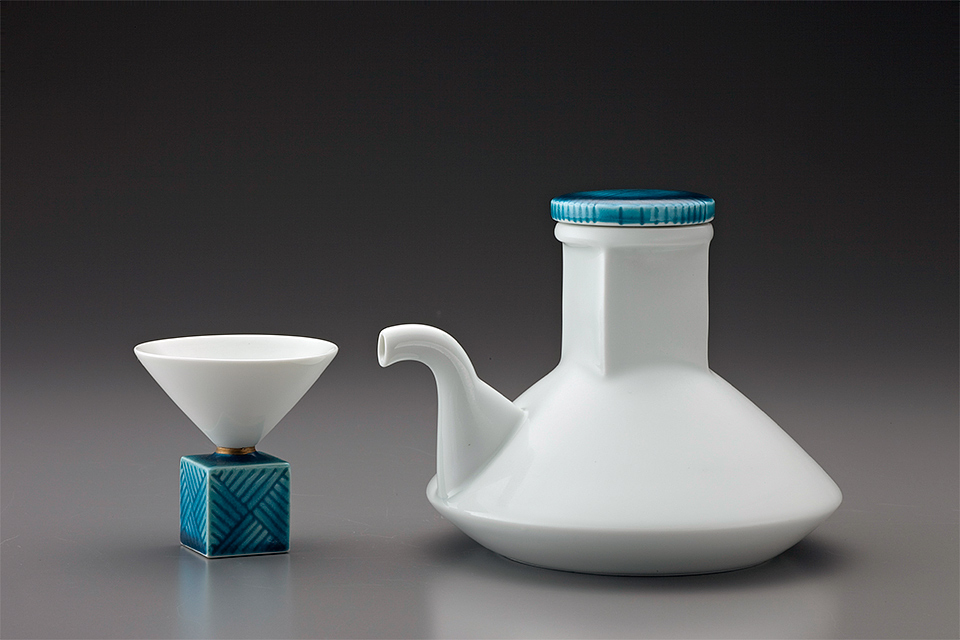
Sake Set "Turkey Blue" (1988)

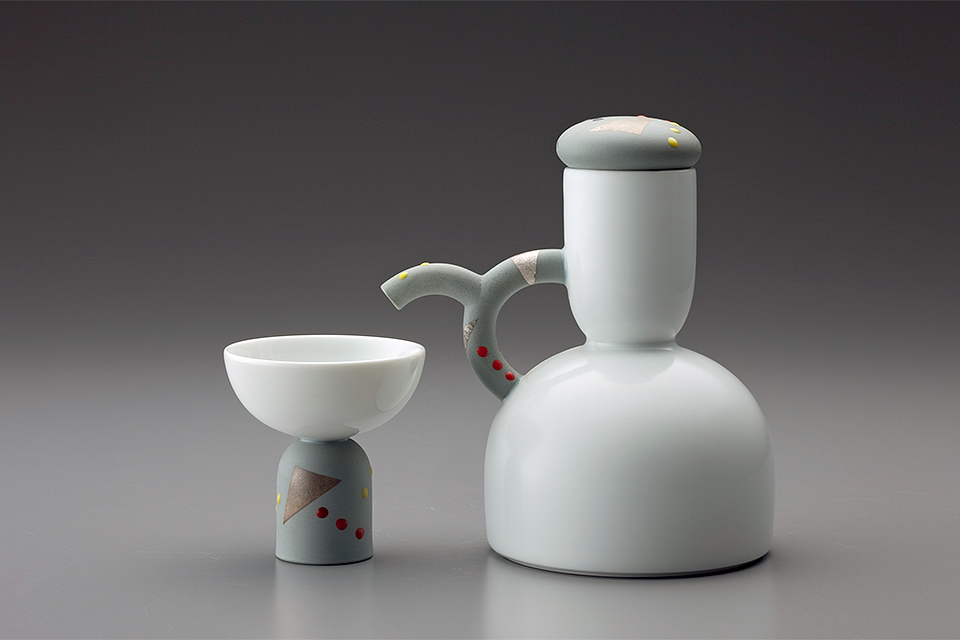
Sake Set "Arabesque" (1988)

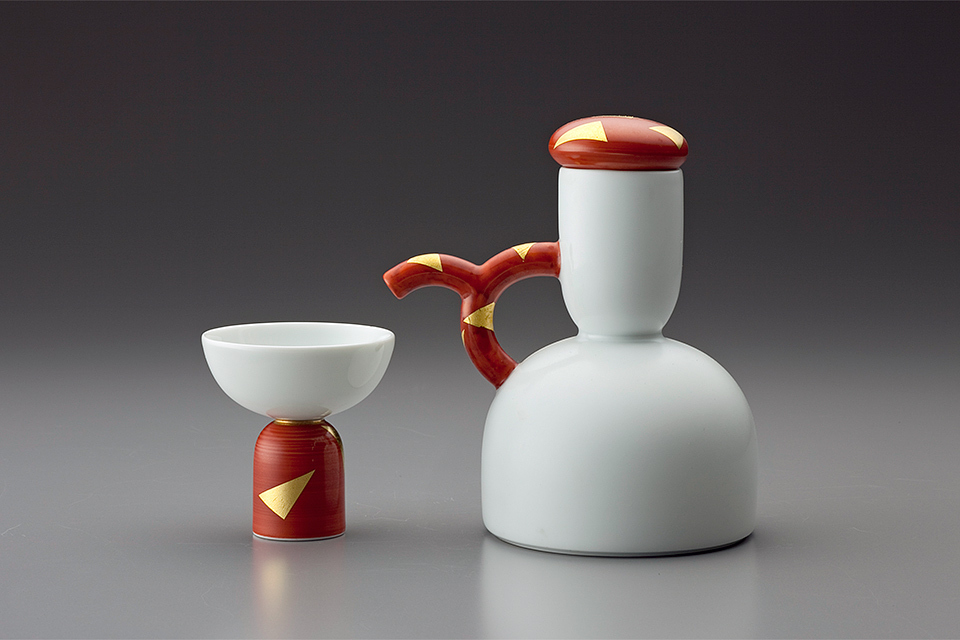
Sake Set "Vermilion" (1988)

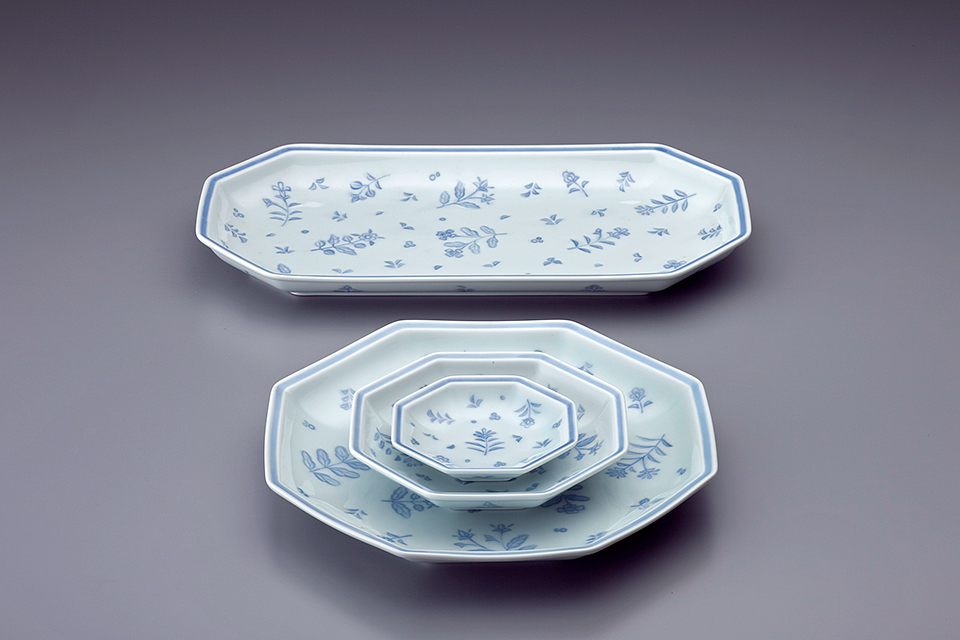
Oriental Pattern series / Dish (1989)

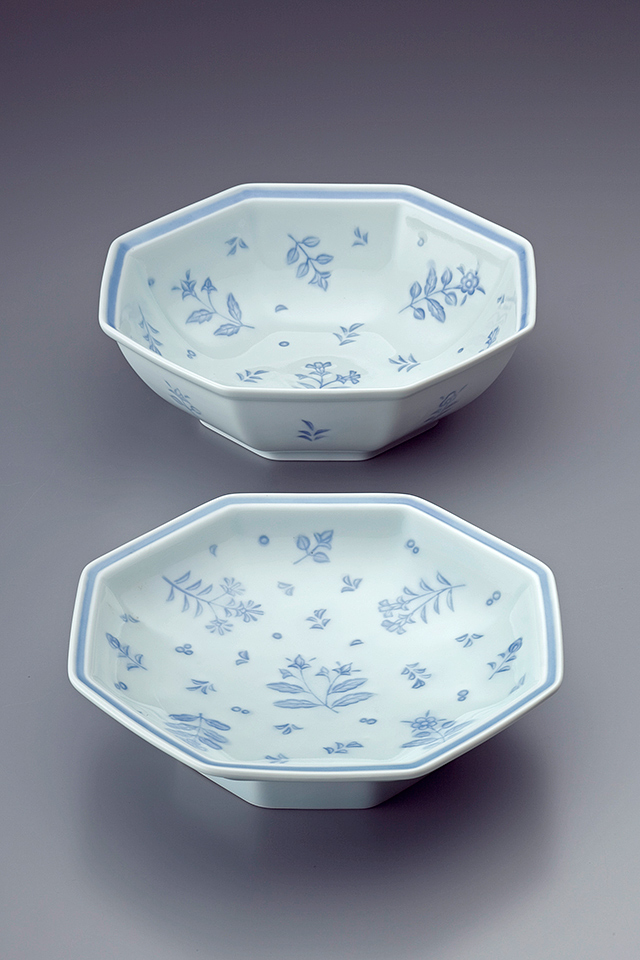
Oriental Pattern series / Bowl (1989)

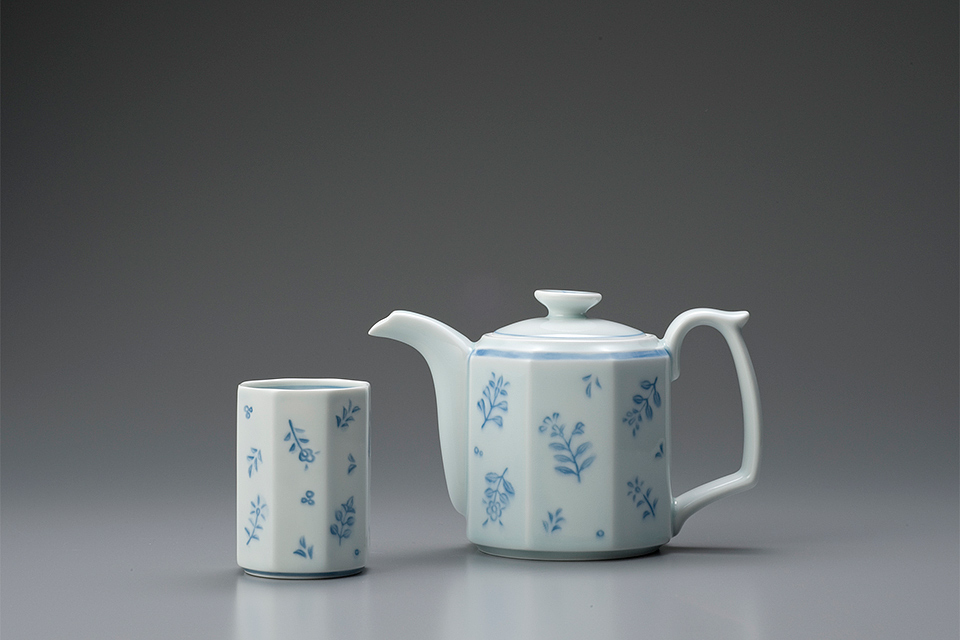
Oriental Pattern series / Teapot (1989)

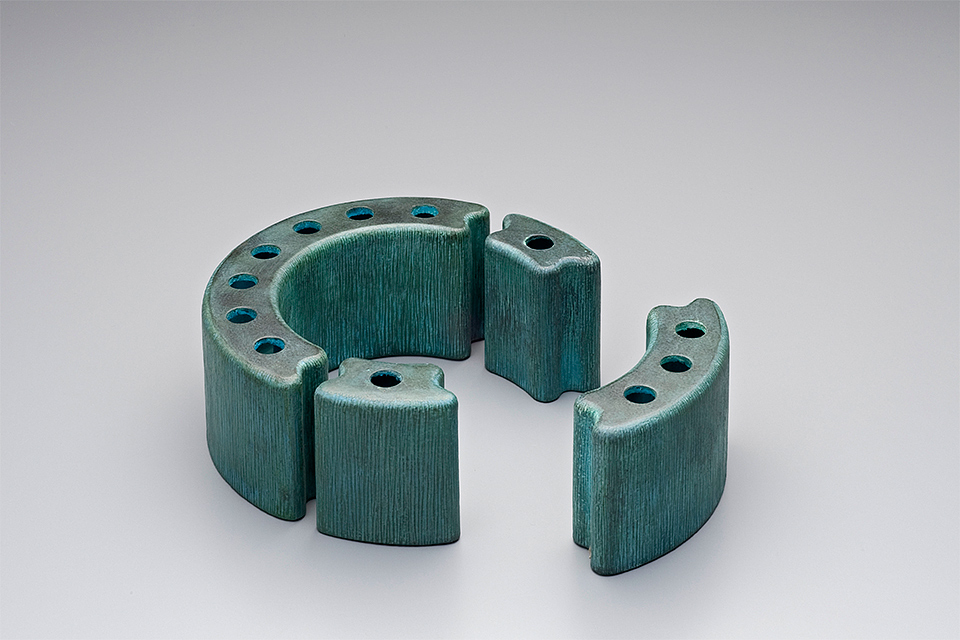
Vase (bronze, 1989)

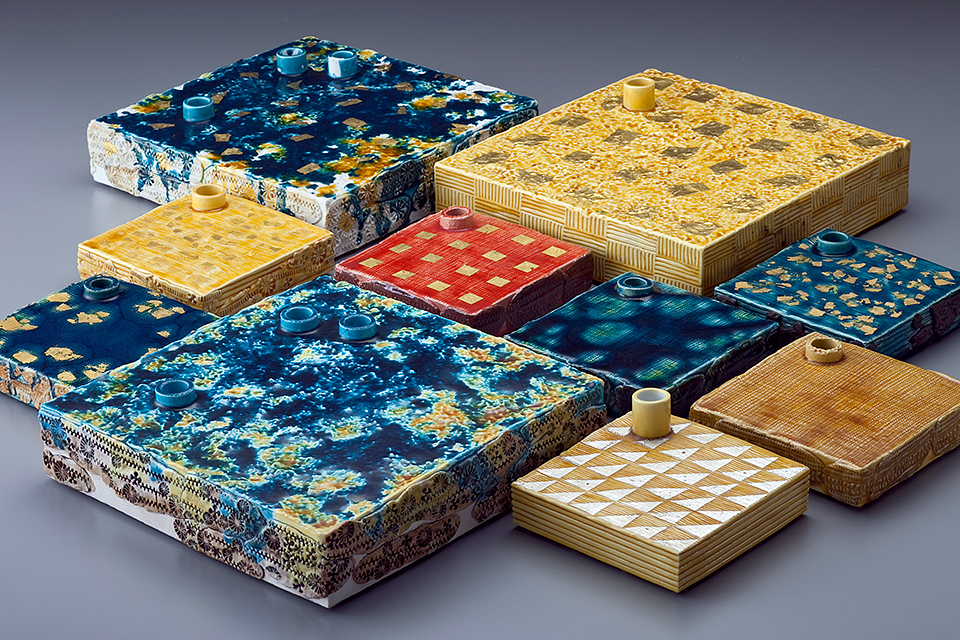
Square Vase (1989-1990)

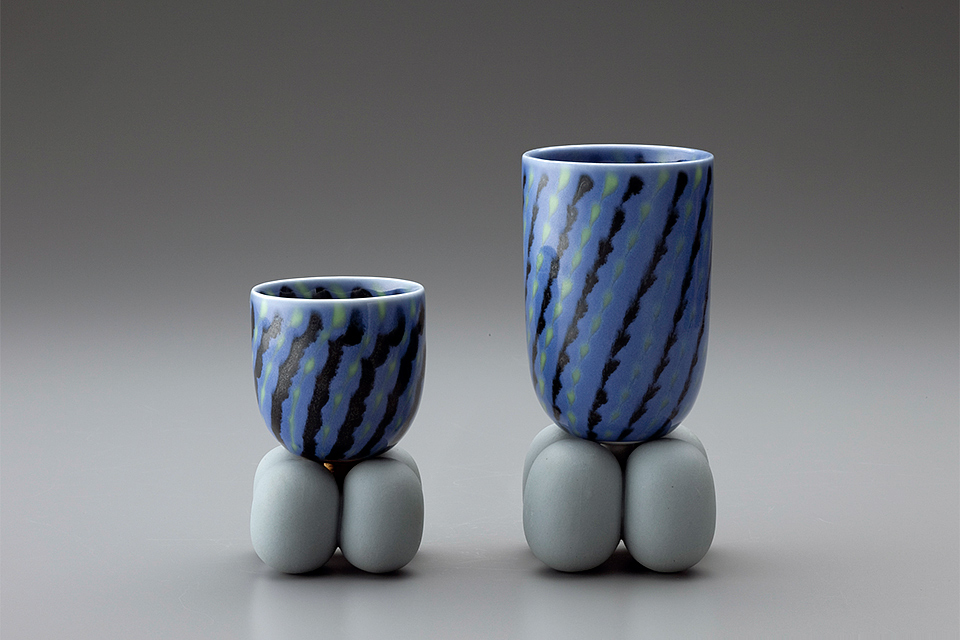
Sake Cup A (1989)

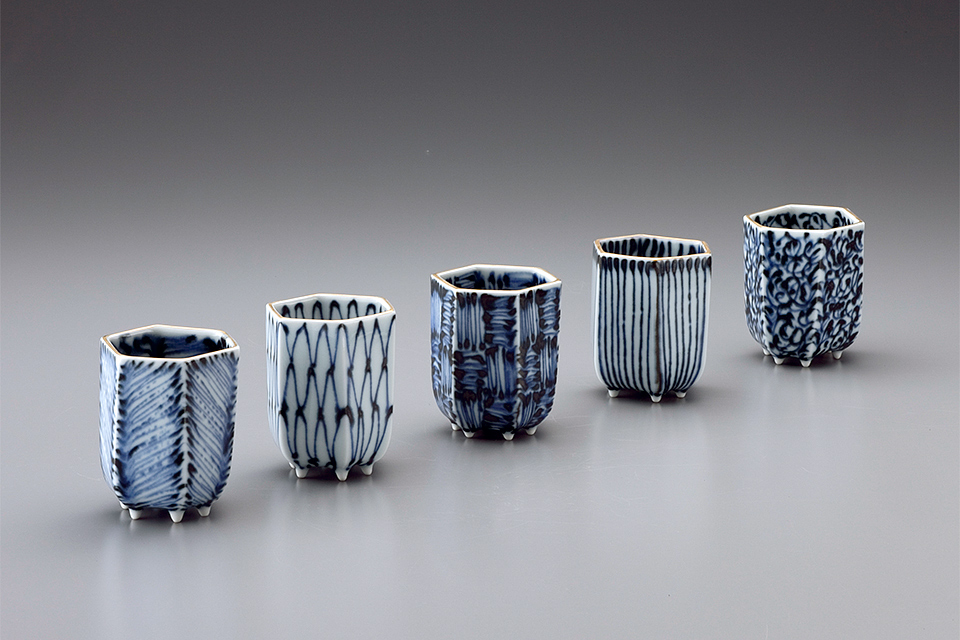
Hexagonal Sake Cup (1989)

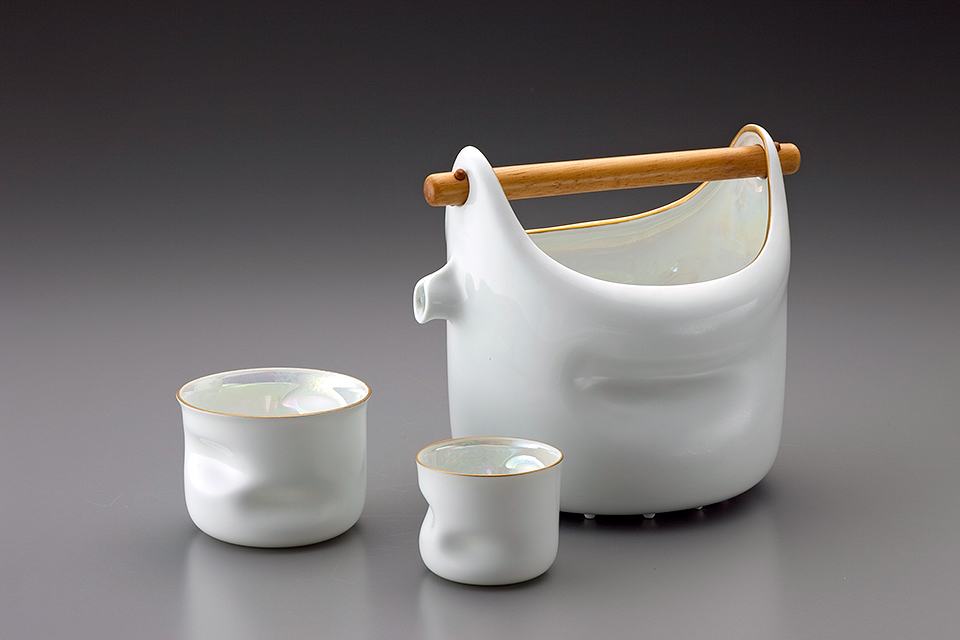
Gold Pearl Set (1989)

=== In the 1990s ===
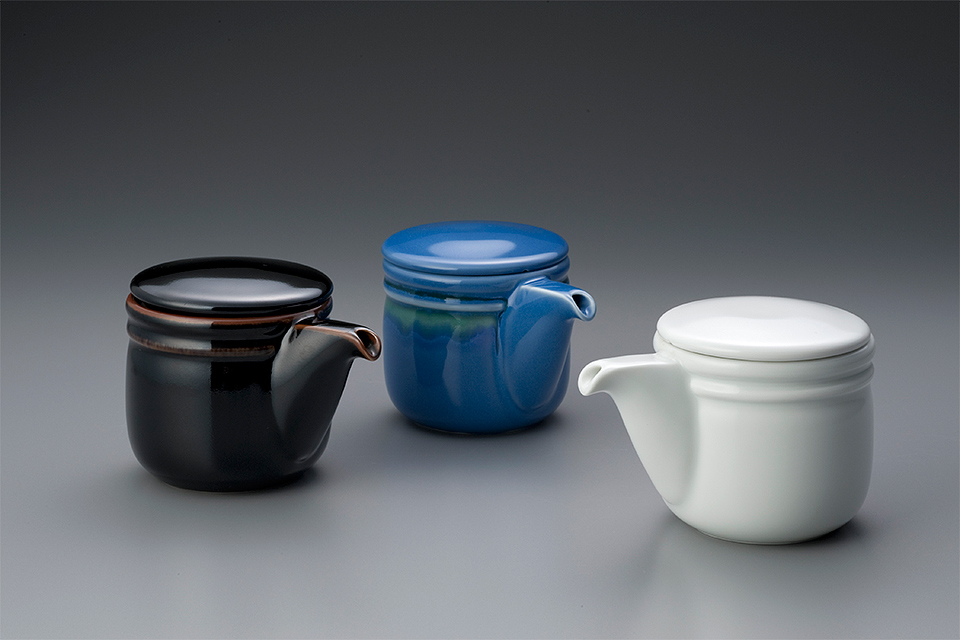
O-type Teapot "HOHIN" (1990)

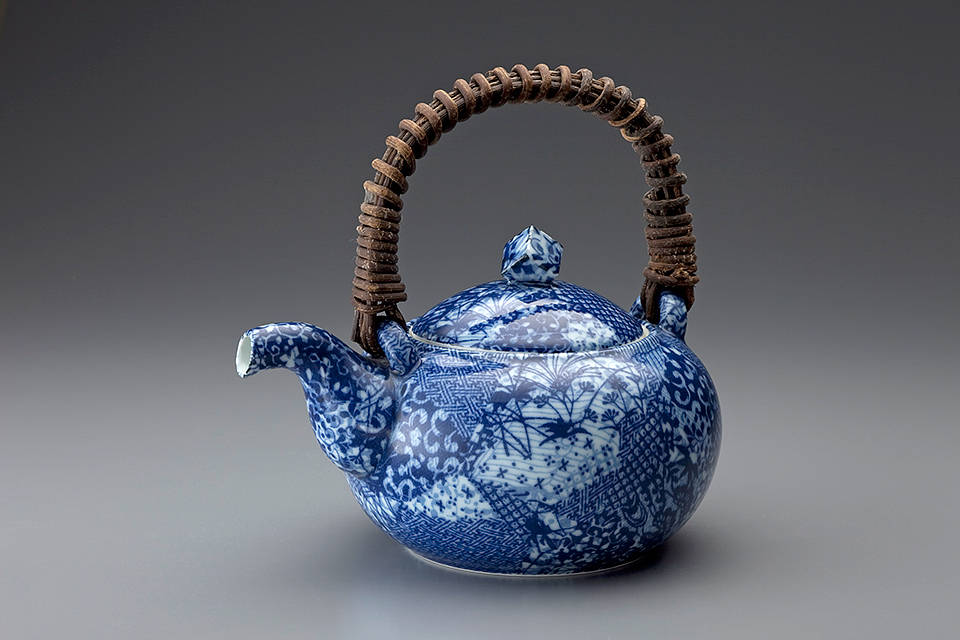
Teapot Printed Arabesque (1990)

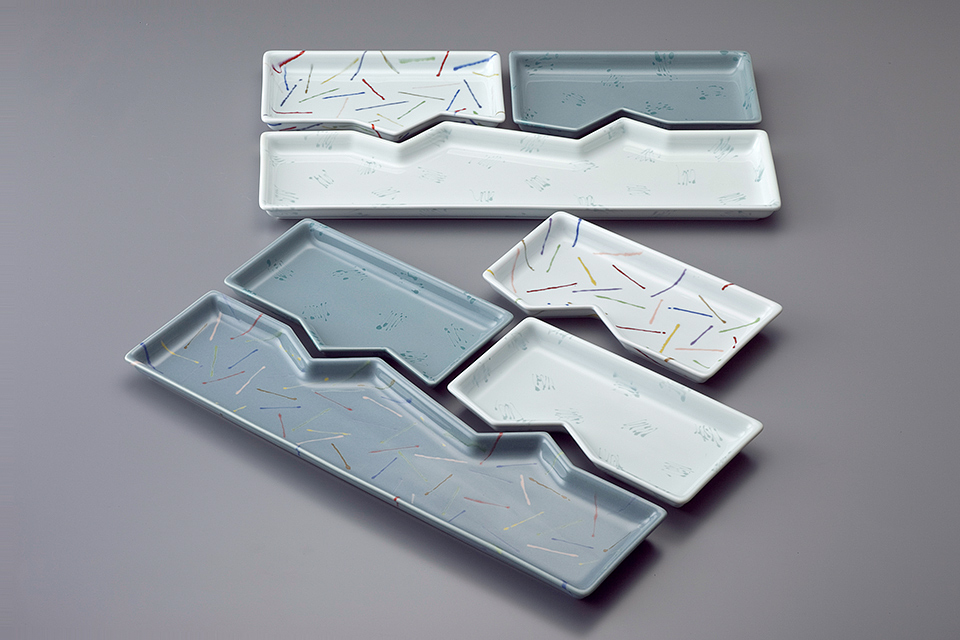
No.4 Party Tray (1991)

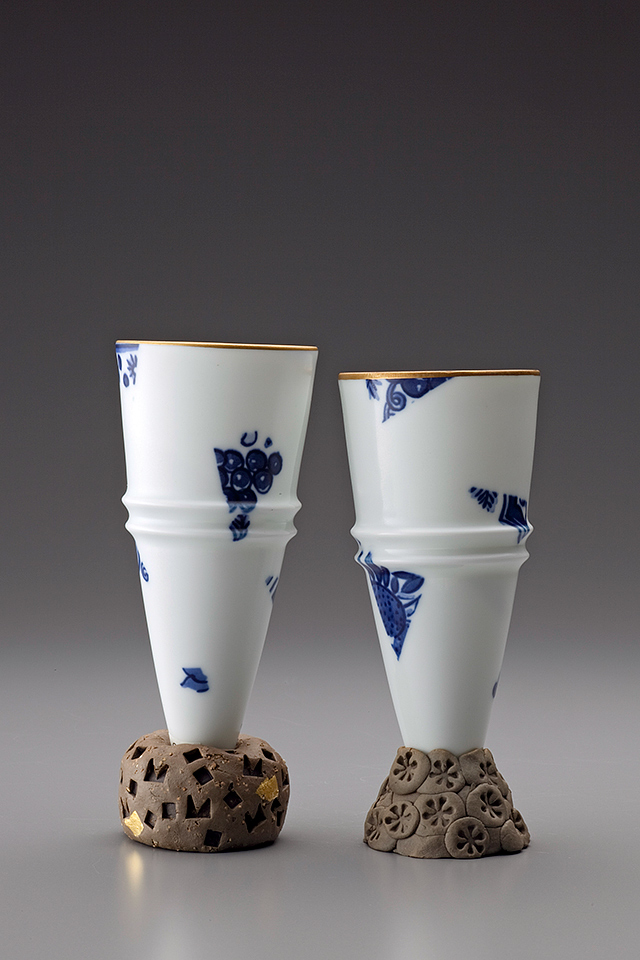
Horn Cup (1991)

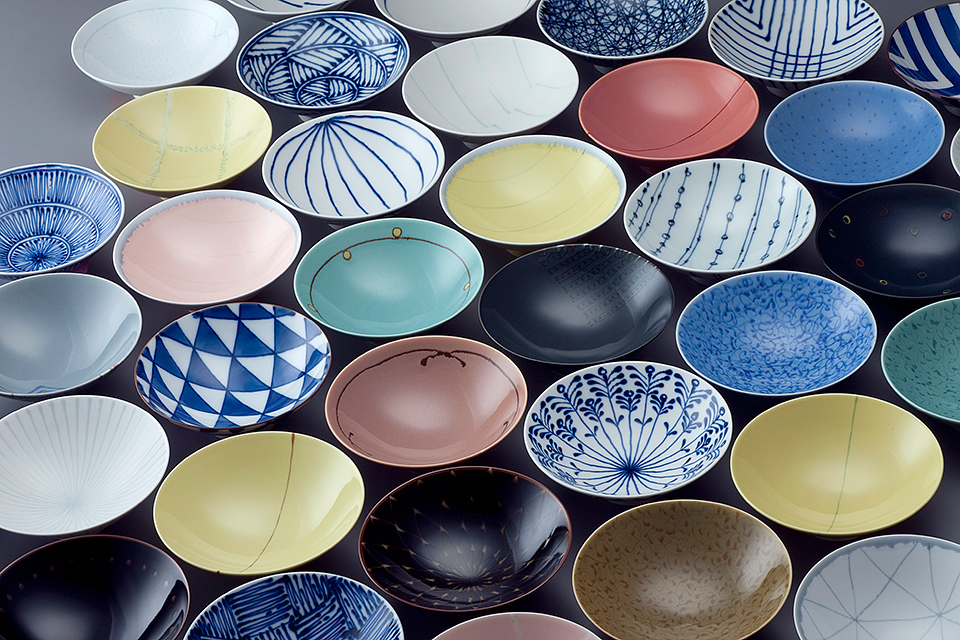
Shallow Ricebowl (1992)

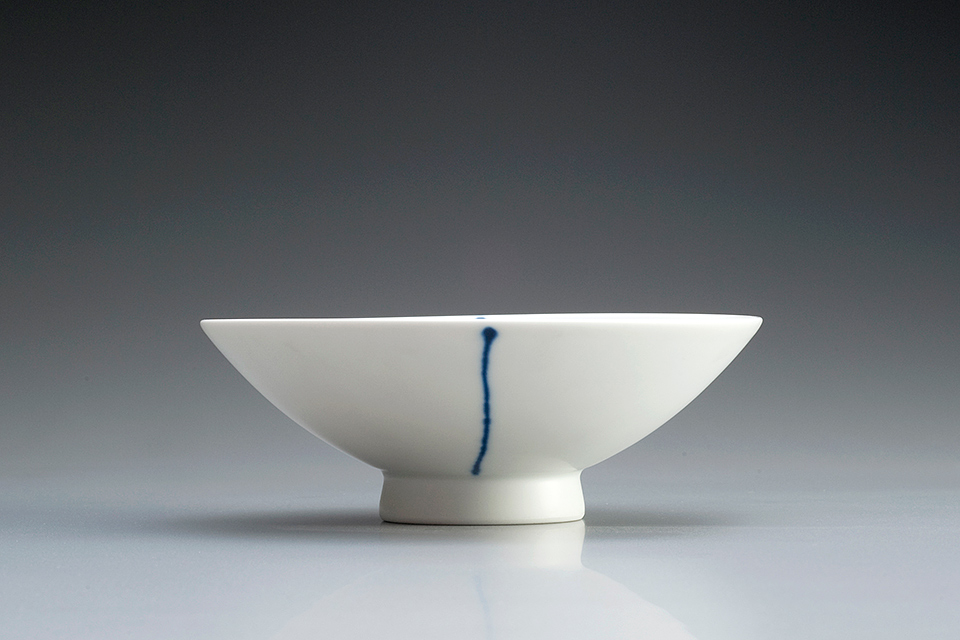
Shallow Ricebowl (1992)

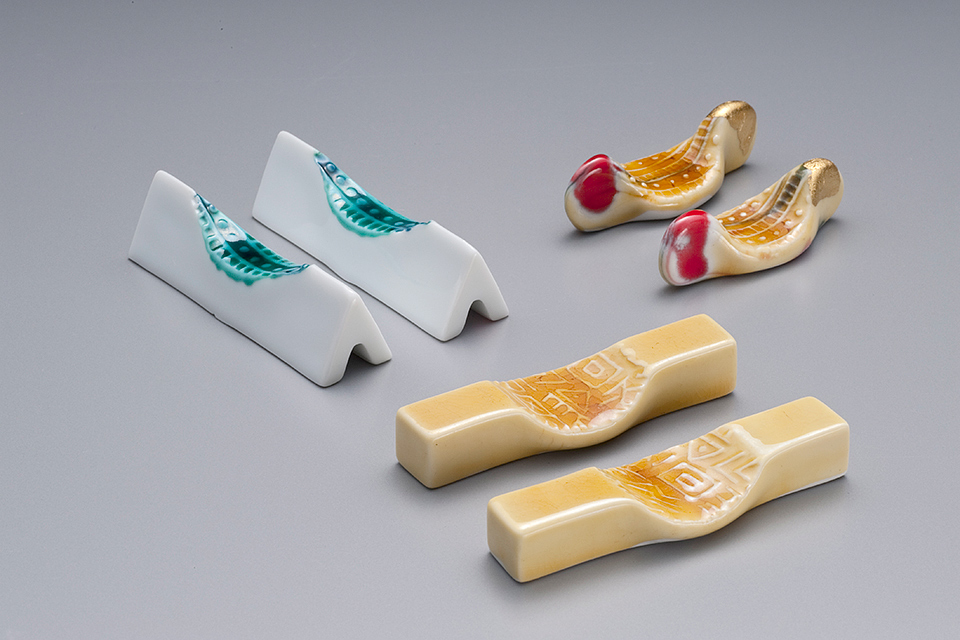
Chopstick Rest "Circle, Triangle, Square" (1992)

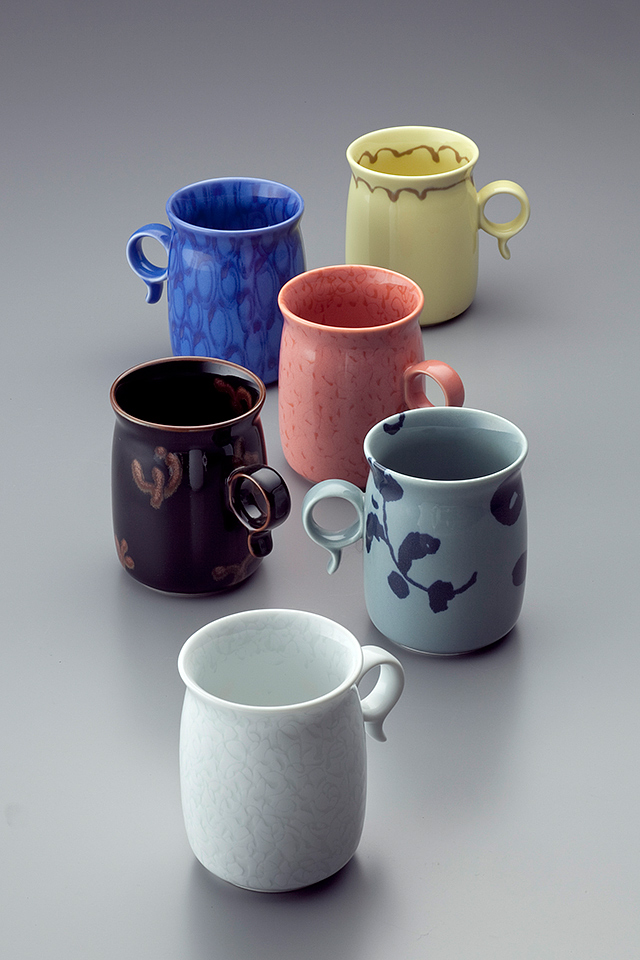
Q-type Mug (1993)

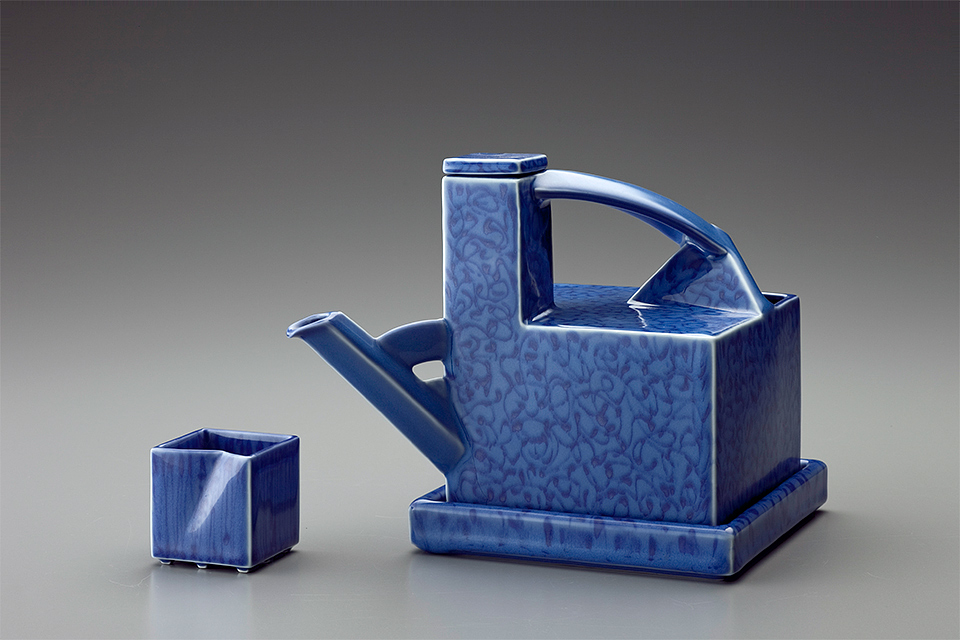
Cubic Cooling Sake Set (1993)

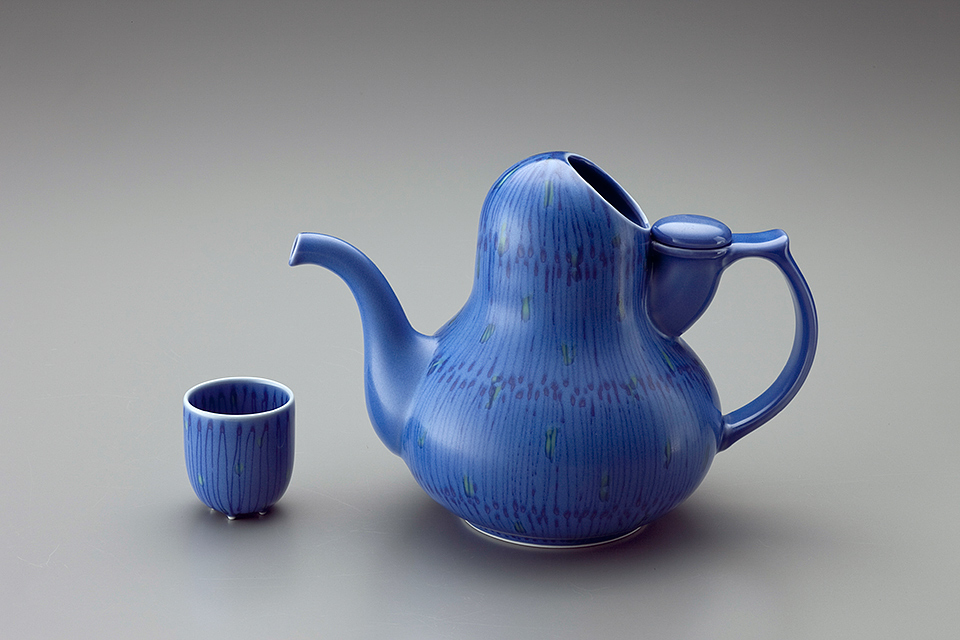
Round Cooling Sake Set (1993)

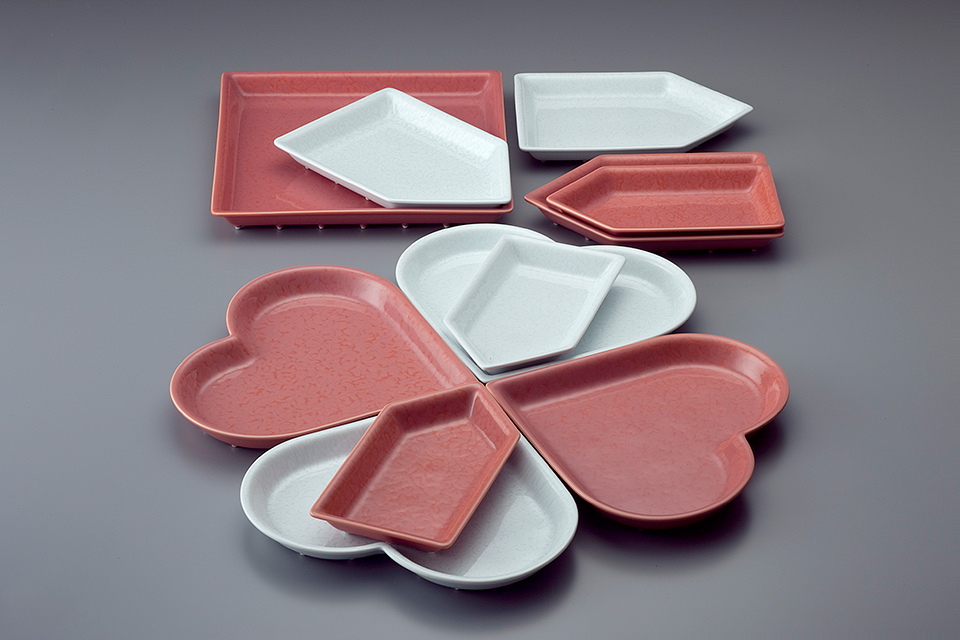
Party Tray "Cerabesque" (1994)

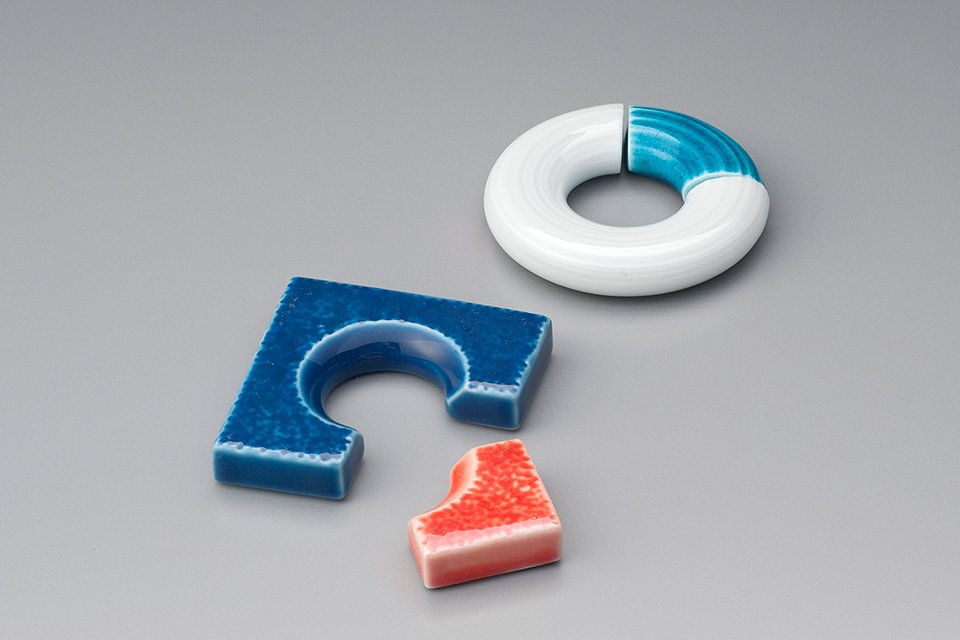
Square, Circle Chopstick Rest (1994)

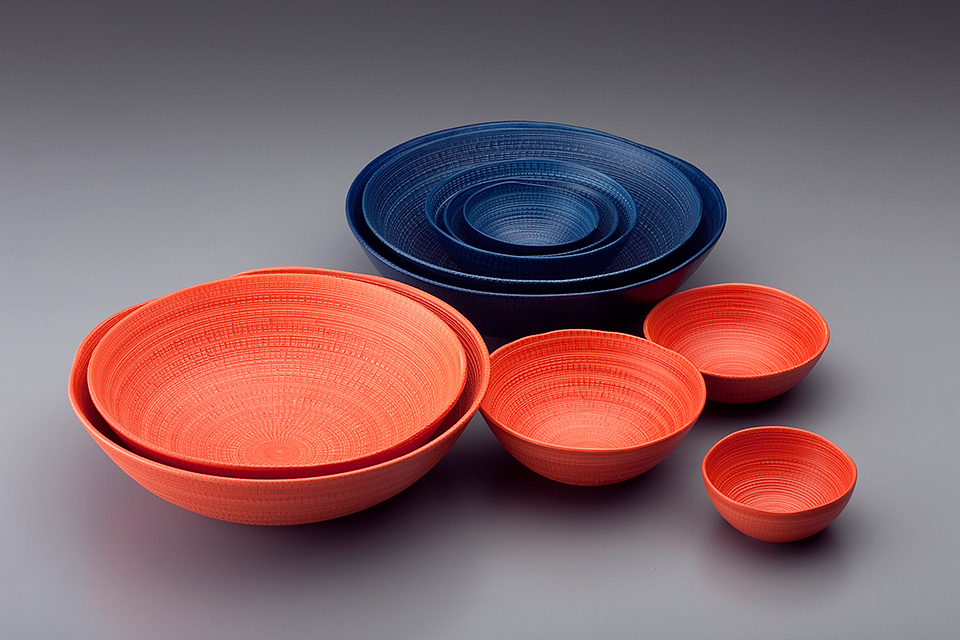
Shell series "Eddying Current" / Bowl (1995)

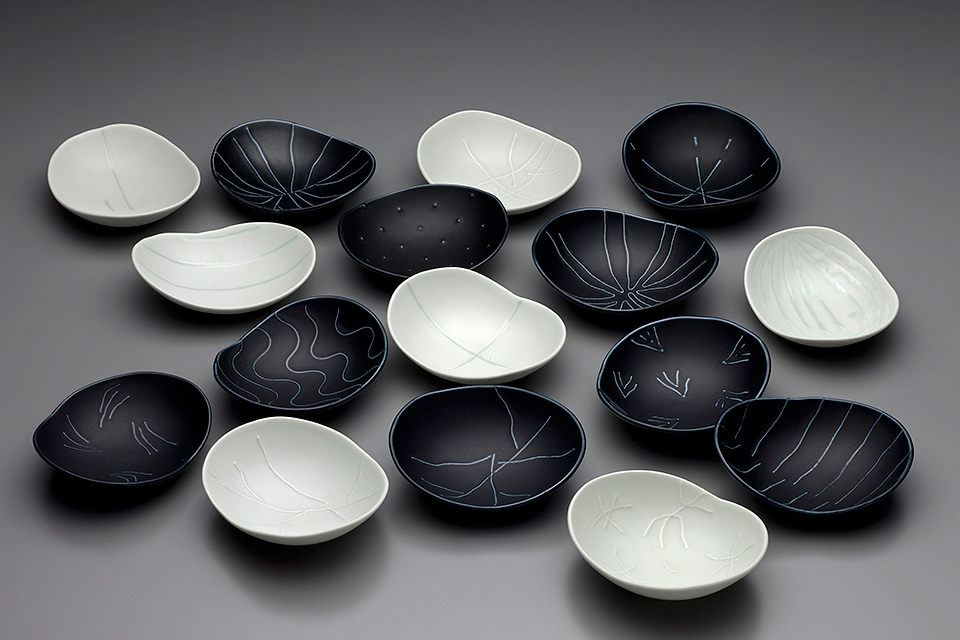
Free Bowl, Small (1998)

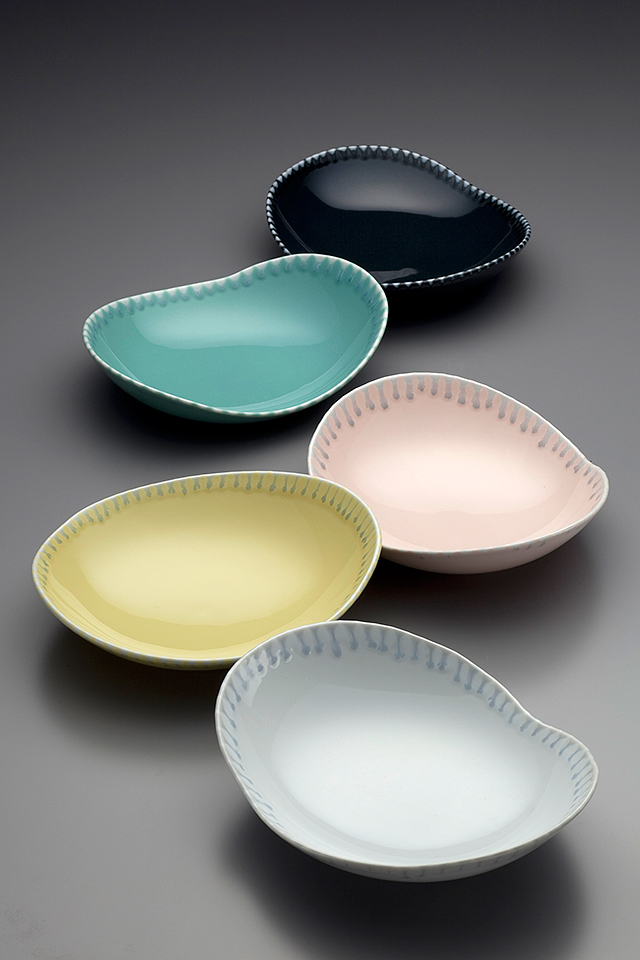
Free Bowl, Large (1998)

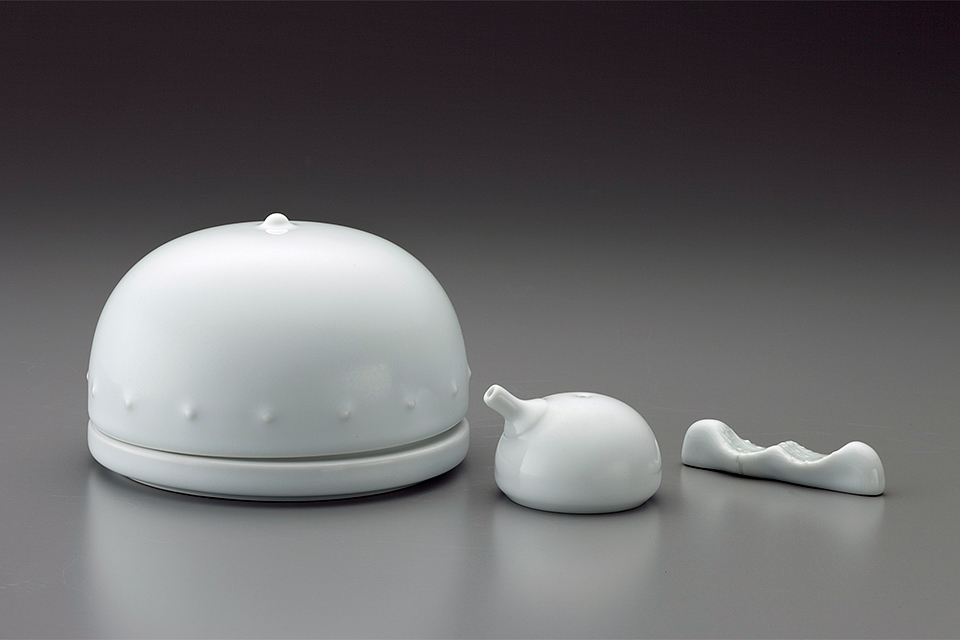
Bird Calligraphy Set (2000)

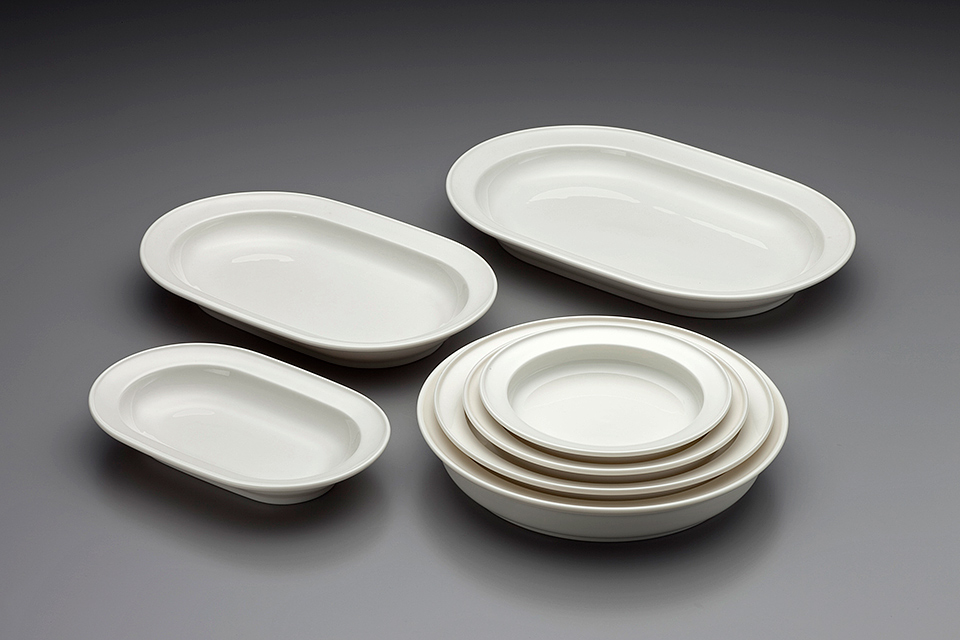
Universal Plate (2001)

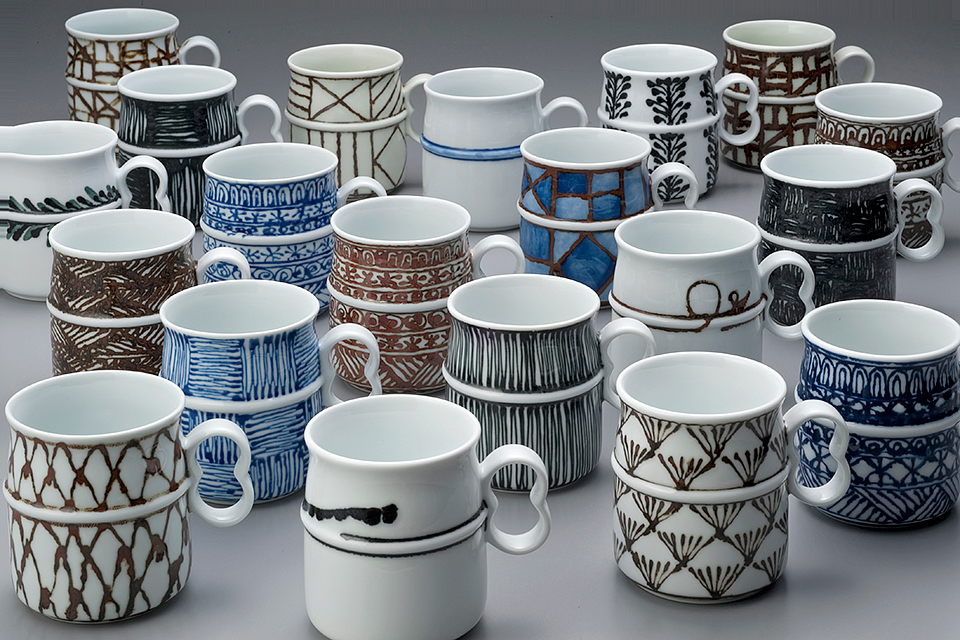
8-type Mug (2004)

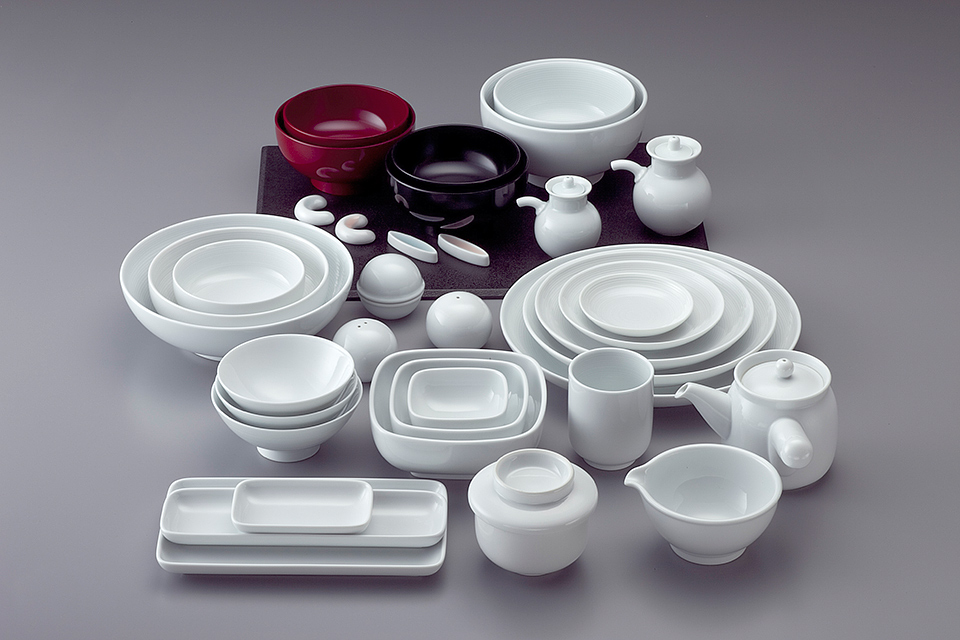
MUJI Japanese Tableware (2004)

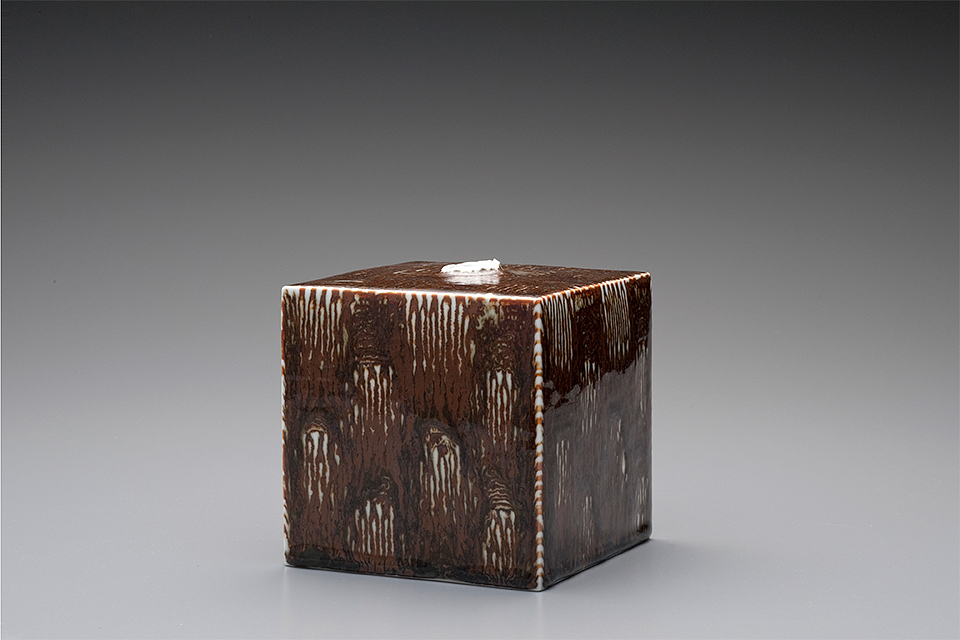
Cubic Vase (2004)

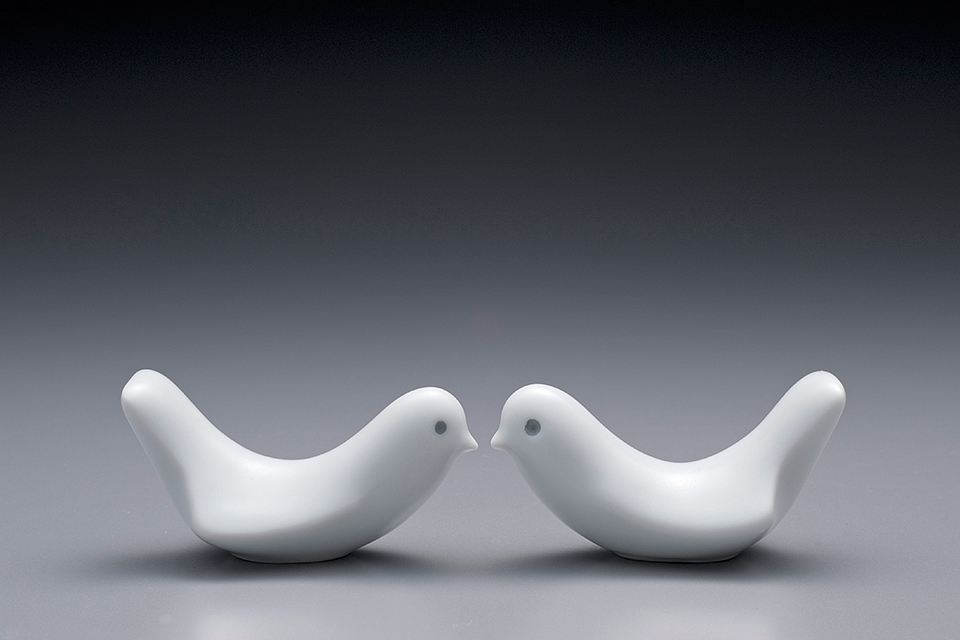
LoveBird (2004)

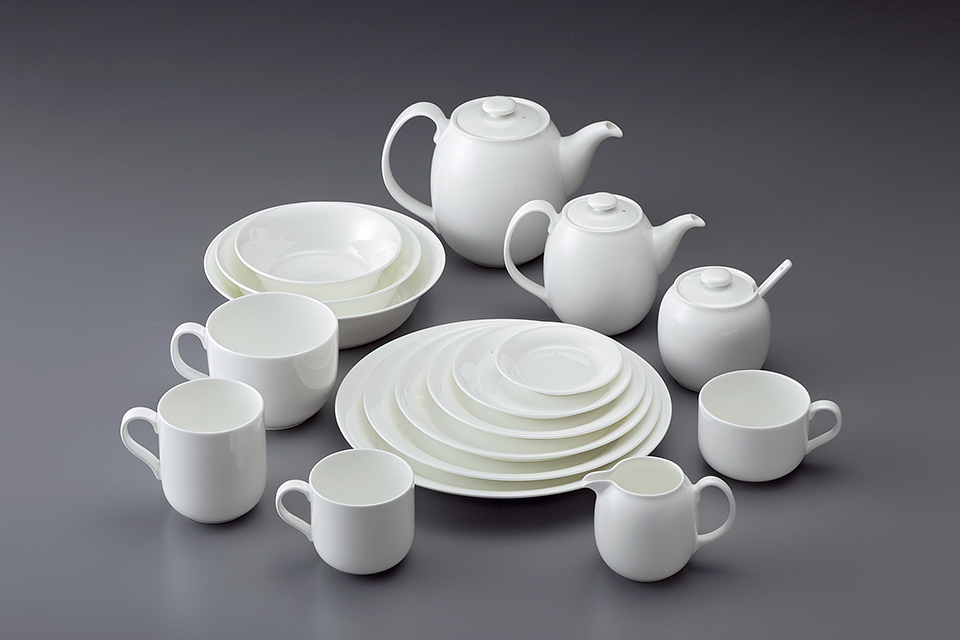
MUJI Bone China (2005)
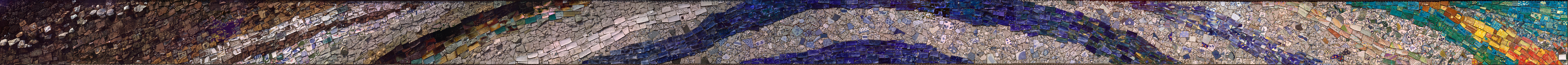
Ceramic Wall "Ceramic Road" in Ceramic Park in Hasami Nagasaki pref. JAPAN(1995)

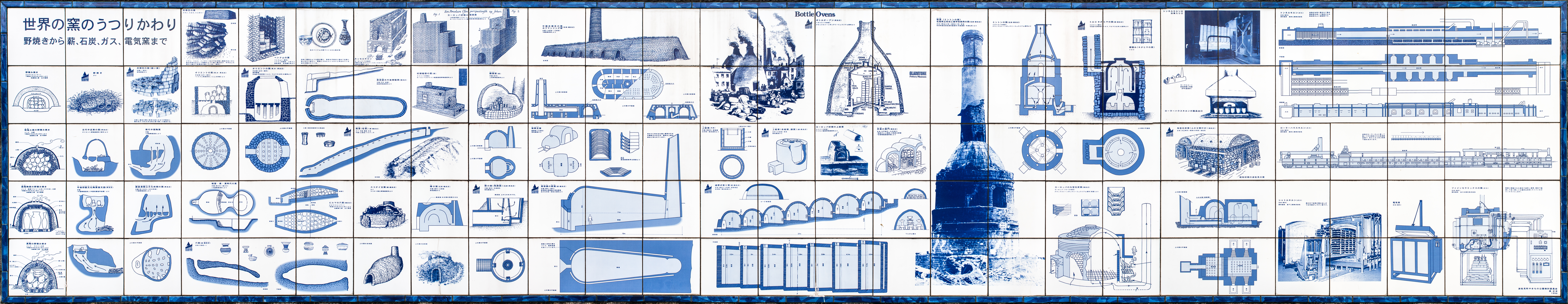
Ceramic Wall "Kilns around the world" in Ceramic Park in Hasami Nagasaki pref. JAPAN(1996)

== Awards and honors ==
- May 1960 The 1st Good Design Award by Good Design Committee (current Japan Design Committee)
- 1960 Good Design (G mark) Selection (Ministry of International Trade and Industry) G-type Soysauce Bottle
- 1973 The 1st KUNII KITARO Industrial Design Award (Japan Industrial Arts Foundation)
- Jan, 1975 The 20th Mainichi Industrial Design Award (Sponsored by The Mainichi Newspapers)
- Jul, 1975 International Ceramic Art Exhibition, Industrial Department Gold award, Faenza Italy for P-type Coffee Service
- 1977 The 7th International Industrial Design Exhibition in Valencia, Spain, Gold Prize in the Ceramic Division for A-type Party Tray
- Mar, 1983 The 13th International Industrial Design Exhibition in Valencia, Spain, Grand Prix in the Ceramic Division for Shell Bowl
- May 1999 Japan Ceramic Society Gold Award (Japan Ceramic Society)
- 2004 Masaru Katsumi Award

== Exhibitions ==
- Feb, 1969 Perspectives of Modern Design (National Museum of Modern Art, Kyoto) - Invited exhibits (Table ware set)
- Feb, 1982 ”Modern dishes - Pouring" (National Museum of Modern Art, Tokyo) - Invited exhibits (G-type Soysauce Bottle, P-type Coffee Service etc.)
- Nov, 1985 "Prospects for Contemporary Japanese Art - Design in the life" (Museum of Modern Art, Toyama) - Invited exhibits (Series "Shell")
- Dec, 1986 "Japanese avant-garde1910-1970" (Centre Georges Pompidou, Paris) - Invited exhibits (G-type Soysauce Bottle)
- Jul, 1991 "Japanese modern pottery dishes" (Aberystwyth Arts Centre, Wales, United Kingdom) - (Series "Ripples" etc.)
- Jul, 1993 "Design made in Nippon" (Hiroshima City Museum of Contemporary Art) - Invited exhibits (G-type Soysauce Bottle)
- Oct, 1993 "Always looking at our lifestyle - Considering of Modern Ceramics Dishes" (The Museum of Modern Art, Saitama) - Invited exhibits (Shallow Ricebowl etc.)
- Sep, 1994 "Japanese Design after 1950" (Philadelphia Museum of Art, USA) - Invited exhibits (G-type Soysauce Bottle, A-type Party Tray)
- Sep, 1997 "10 Designers from all over the world" (Museo Internazionale delle Ceramiche, Italy) - Invited exhibits (Test-B with Cylinder etc.)
- Jun, 1998 "Masahiro Mori's Ceramic Design" (Aichi Prefectural Ceramic Museum)
- Oct, 1998 "Product Designer Mori Masahiro Exhibition" (Nagasaki Prefectural Museum)
- Oct, 1999 "Movements of Contemporary Japanese art - New landscape of industrial design" (Museum of Modern Art, Toyama) - Invited exhibits (Ricebowl)
- May, 2000 "Masahiro Mori - Japanese Modern Ceramic Design" (German Porcelain Museum, Art Museum in Halle Germany)
- Jun, 2001 "Footprint of Masahiro Mori's Ceramic Design" (Gallery at Saga city public library) Japan Ceramic Society Gold Award Commemorative
- Jun, 2002 "Masahiro Mori: A Reformer of Ceramic Design" (National Museum of Modern Art, Tokyo)
- Oct, 2009 "Retrospective of Masahiro Mori's oeuvre - Seeking the affluence of daily dishes" Organizers (Agency for Cultural Affairs | Executive Committee for the promotion plan for regional arts and culture in Saga | Executive Committee for the Retrospective of Masahiro Mori's oeuvre.) Co-organizer (The Kyushu Ceramic Museum)

== See also ==
- Haizan Matsumoto
- Katsuhei Toyoguchi
- Masaru Katsumi
- Kaj Franck
- Isamu Kenmochi
- Yusaku Kamekura
- Sori Yanagi
- Kenji Ekuan
- Osamu Ishiyama
- Kenya Hara
- Naoto Fukasawa

== Notes ==
- "Product designer Mori Masahiro Exhibition" Nagasaki Prefectural Art Museum (Oct, 1998)
- "Ceramic Standard - Masahiro Mori Collection -" Petit Grand Publishing, Inc., (May, 2005) ISBN 978-4-939102-88-2
- Mori Masahiro Design Studio, LLC. "The works of Masahiro Mori" Random House Kodansha (Oct, 2009) ISBN 978-4-270-00543-9
