= Naoto Fukasawa =

Japanese designer, author, and educator

- 深澤 直人
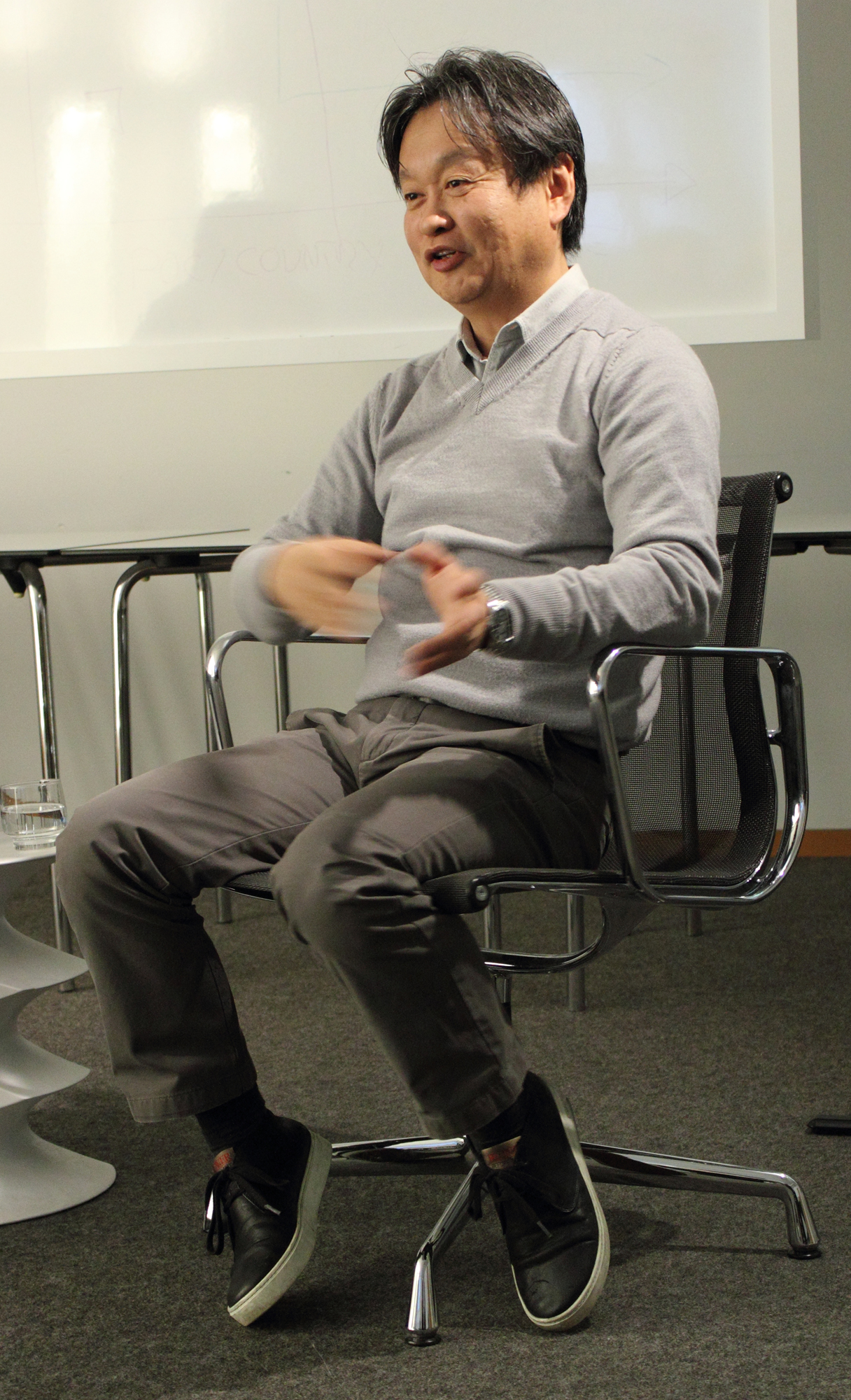
- Fukasawa seated on an Eames Aluminum Group chair (2012)
- Born: 1956 (age 69–70); Kōfu, Yamanashi Prefecture, Japan
- Education: Tama Art University
- Occupation: Industrial designer
- Website: naotofukasawa.com

Naoto Fukasawa (Japanese: 深澤 直人, Hepburn: Fukasawa Naoto; born 1956) is a Japanese designer, author, and educator, working in the fields of product and furniture design. He is known for his product design work with the Japanese retail company Muji, as well as collaborations with companies such as Herman Miller, Alessi, B&B Italia, Emeco, Magis, Maruni, Realme, and HAY.

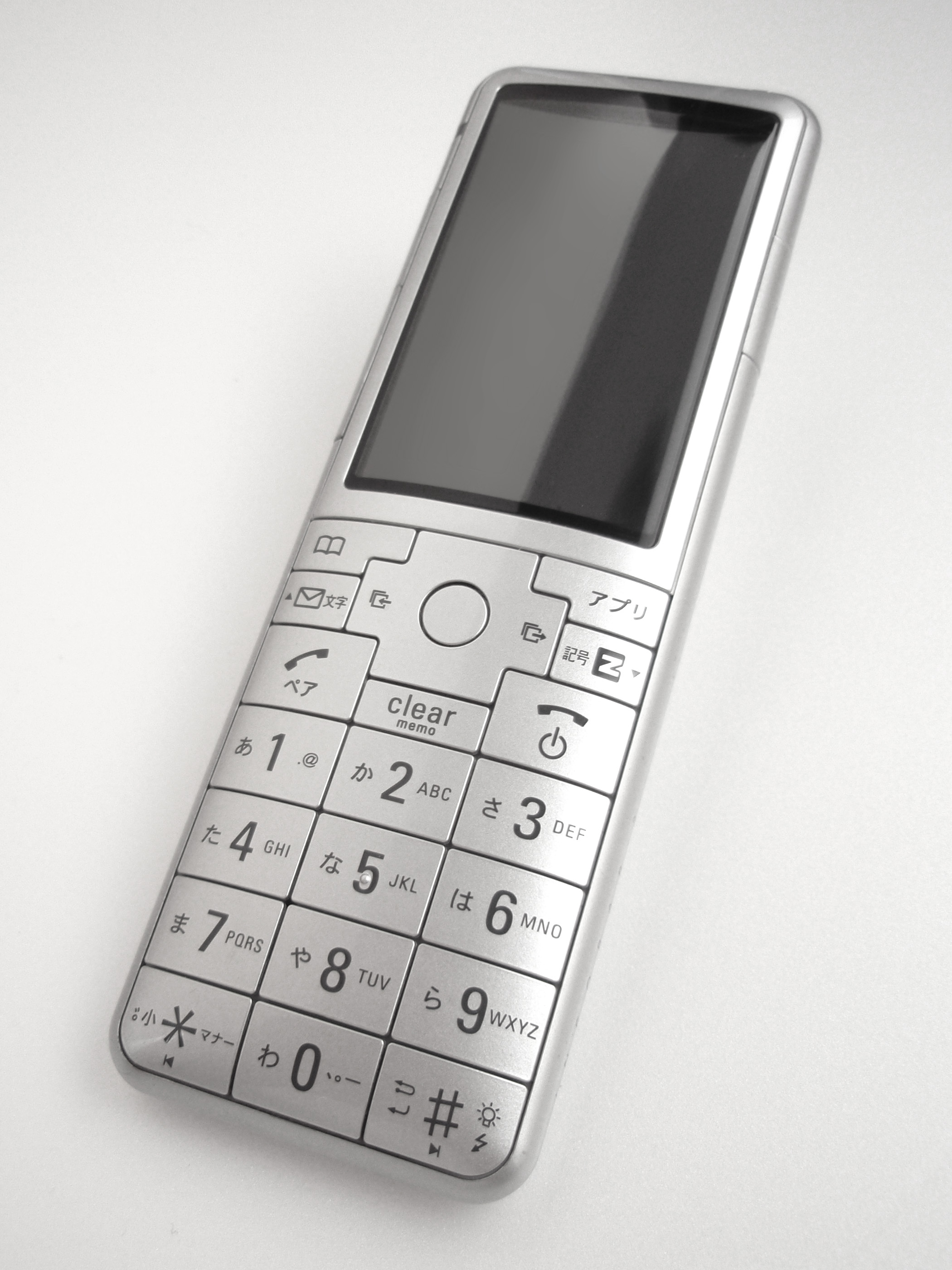
Infobar2 mobile telephone (2007)

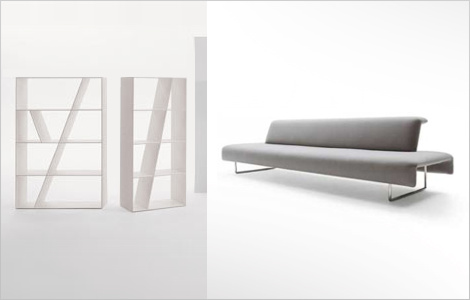
Designs for B&B Italia by Fukasawa

Fukasawa has been described by Bloomberg News as one of the world's most influential designers.

== Biography ==
Fukasawa was born in Kōfu, Yamanashi Prefecture, Japan in 1956. He studied product design at Tama Art University graduating in 1980. After graduating, Fukasawa worked as a product developer at Seiko Epson until 1988, before joining the design firm ID Two, a predecessor to the design consulting firm IDEO in San Francisco, California, for whom he later established a Tokyo office in 1996. During this time he collaborated with the English industrial designer Sam Hecht. In 2002, Fukasawa became a MUJI advisory board member, and worked on the development of many of their products. After leaving IDEO, he established his own independent firm Naoto Fukasawa Design in 2003. In the same year, Fukasawa founded the "±0" (Plus Minus Zero) brand of household electrical appliances and household products, focused on the design of goods that are felt to be "just right".He has also worked with Italian furniture companies including B&B Italia, Driade, Magis, Artemide, Danese, and Boffi, as well as several German and Northern European companies.

He is one of the co-directors of 21 21 DESIGN SIGHT, Japan's first design museum. Since 2012, he has been the director of the Japanese Folk Crafts Museum.

Since 2014, Fukasawa has taught Integrated Design at Tama Art University as a professor, and previously taught at Musashino Art University. He also occasionally teaches and lectures at other institutions, both in Japan and internationally.

Fukasawa's work is held in the collections of many museums including the Museum of Modern Art in New York (MUJI's wall-mounted CD player, Plus Minus Zero humidifier, and various Neon and Infobar cellular phones by KDDI), the Victoria and Albert Museum in London (Hiroshima chair), and the Philadelphia Museum of Art—which also staged a major retrospective of his work titled Naoto Fukasawa: Things in Themselves in 2024.

== Design approach ==
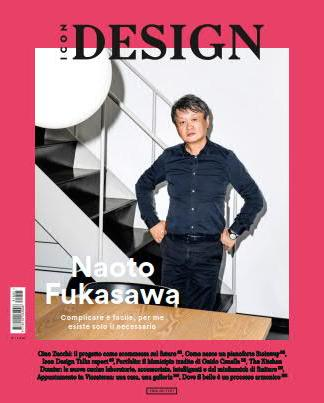
Naoto Fukasawa on the cover of Icon Design, June 2018

Naoto Fukasawa's design approach is centered around the relationship between design and behavior, using terms such as "design dissolving in behavior", "center of consciousness", "normality", "outline" and "archetype" to describe his work. His approach relies on observing how people act and react in their everyday, and finding solutions in these behaviors that link the design to the person. In his 2018 monograph, Fukasawa describes design as "attributing countenance to an object", in which the design is accompanied by the environment and the context.

Fukasawa coined the term "Without Thought" as a philosophy for how design can be found in people's unconscious behavior. Without Thought refers to how objects can feel important when seen for the first time, but only have their initial essence realized when being used. Ever since creating the term, Fukasawa has organized workshops to share his approach to other designers.

In 2006, Fukasawa and British designer Jasper Morrison curated the exhibition that helped explain their idea of the "Super Normal". The exhibition, titled Super Normal, presented 200 objects that were considered "ordinary" or to have been anonymously designed. Items presented in the exhibition ranged from notable objects such as the Bialetti espresso maker to anonymously designed and mass produced objects such as disposable plastic plates. The term defines objects as being absent of identity, originality, and elements that leave an impression, leading to objects that appear ordinary. This design concept can be seen reflected in Fukasawa's work with Muji, where products are created with an anti-branding approach of not presenting any traits that characterize the object.

== Select awards ==
Fukasawa has won over fifty awards, including the American IDEA Gold Award, the German iF Gold Award, the British D&AD Gold Award, the Mainichi Design Award and the 5th Oribe Award.

- 1991 – IDEA Gold Award
- 1994 – Red Dot Design Award
- 1996 – iF Gold Award
- 2003 – Mainichi Design Prize
- 2005 – 5th Oribe Award
- 2007 – Honorary Royal Designer for Industry (Royal Society of Arts), Product Design
- 2014 – Good Design award
- 2018 – Isamu Noguchi Award
- 2024 – Design Excellence Award, Collab, Philadelphia Museum of Art
- 2026 – German Design Award Personality of the Year

== Select exhibitions ==
- 2006, Super Normal, curated by Jasper Morrison and Naoto Fukasawa at Axis Gallery, Tokyo, Japan
- 2016–17, The Boundary between Kogei and Design at the 21st Century Museum of Contemporary art, Kanazawa
- 2024–25, Naoto Fukasawa: Things in Themselves, Philadelphia Museum of Art

== Works ==
Naoto Fukasawa has consulted and designed for several companies, ranging from home appliance retailers to furniture manufacturers. Companies that he has designed for include:

- KDDI Corporation
  - INFOBAR Cellular Phone, 2003
  - INFOBAR 2 Cellular Phone, 2006
  - neon Cellular Phone, 2006
  - INFOBAR A03 Smartphone, 2015
- ±0 (Plus Minus Zero)
  - A Light with a Dish, 2003
  - Wire frame Houseware, 2010
  - Toaster, 2007
- Muji
  - Wall-mounted CD player, 1999
  - Refrigerator, 2014
  - Electric Kettle, 2014
  - Rice Cooker, 2014
- Samsung
  - N310 Netbook, 2009
  - Multi Xpress7 Color Printer, 2015
- Maruni
  - Hiroshima Furniture Collection, 2010–2016
- B&B Italia
  - Belle and Bull, Chair and Table, 2018
- HAY
  - Pao lamp series
- realme
  - realme GT Master Edition
  - realme GT 2
  - realme GT 2 Pro
  - realme 16 Pro Series

== Gallery ==
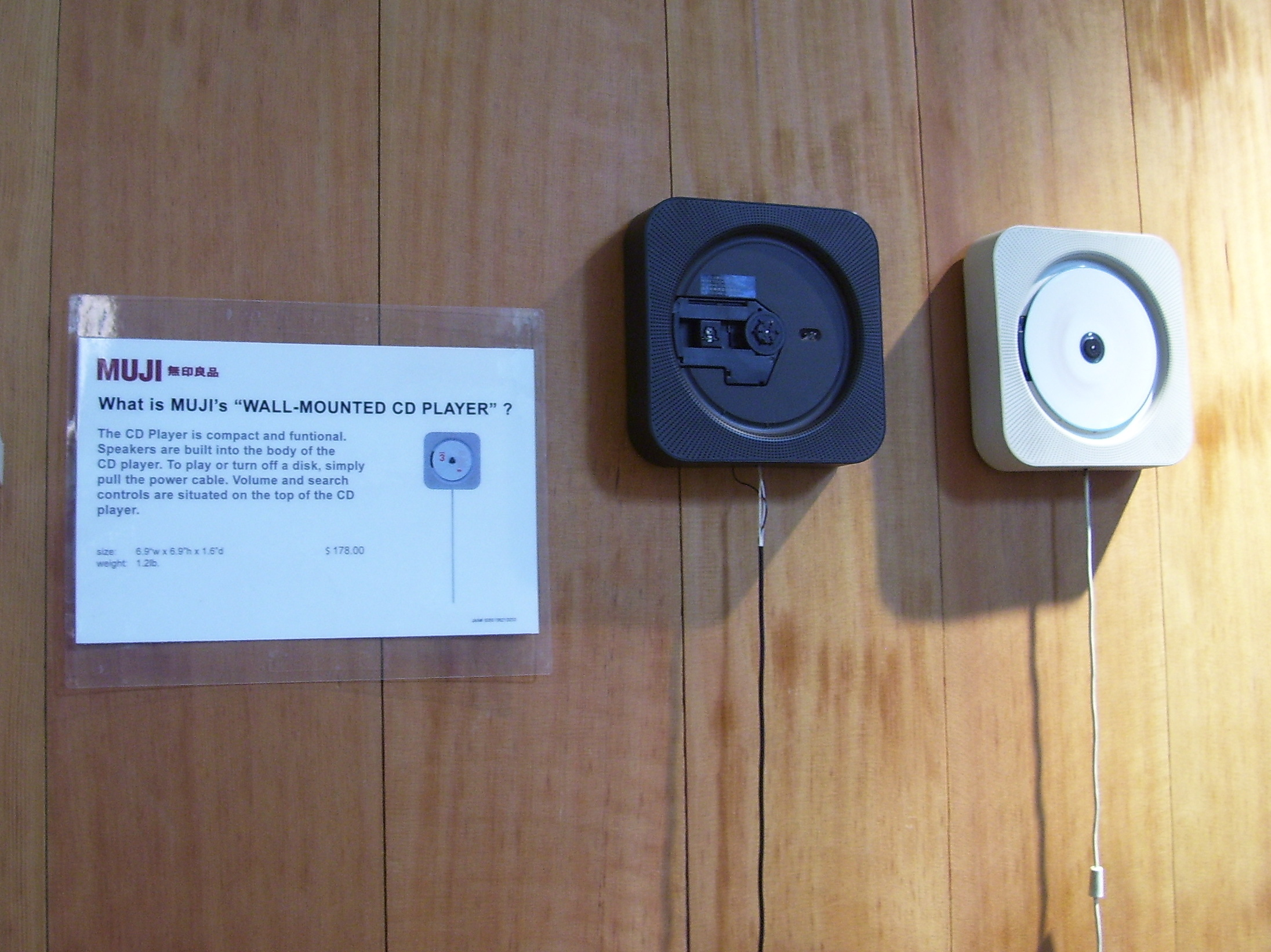
Wall-mounted CD player for Muji

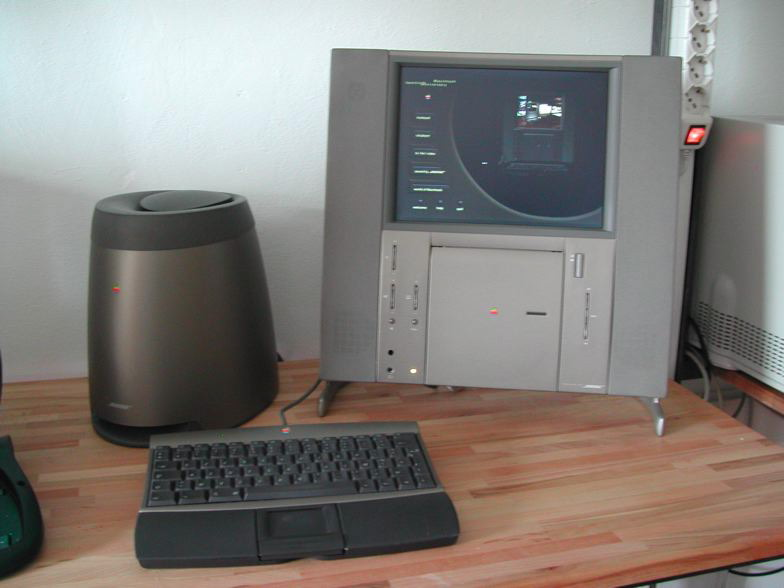
Twentieth Anniversary Macintosh for Apple

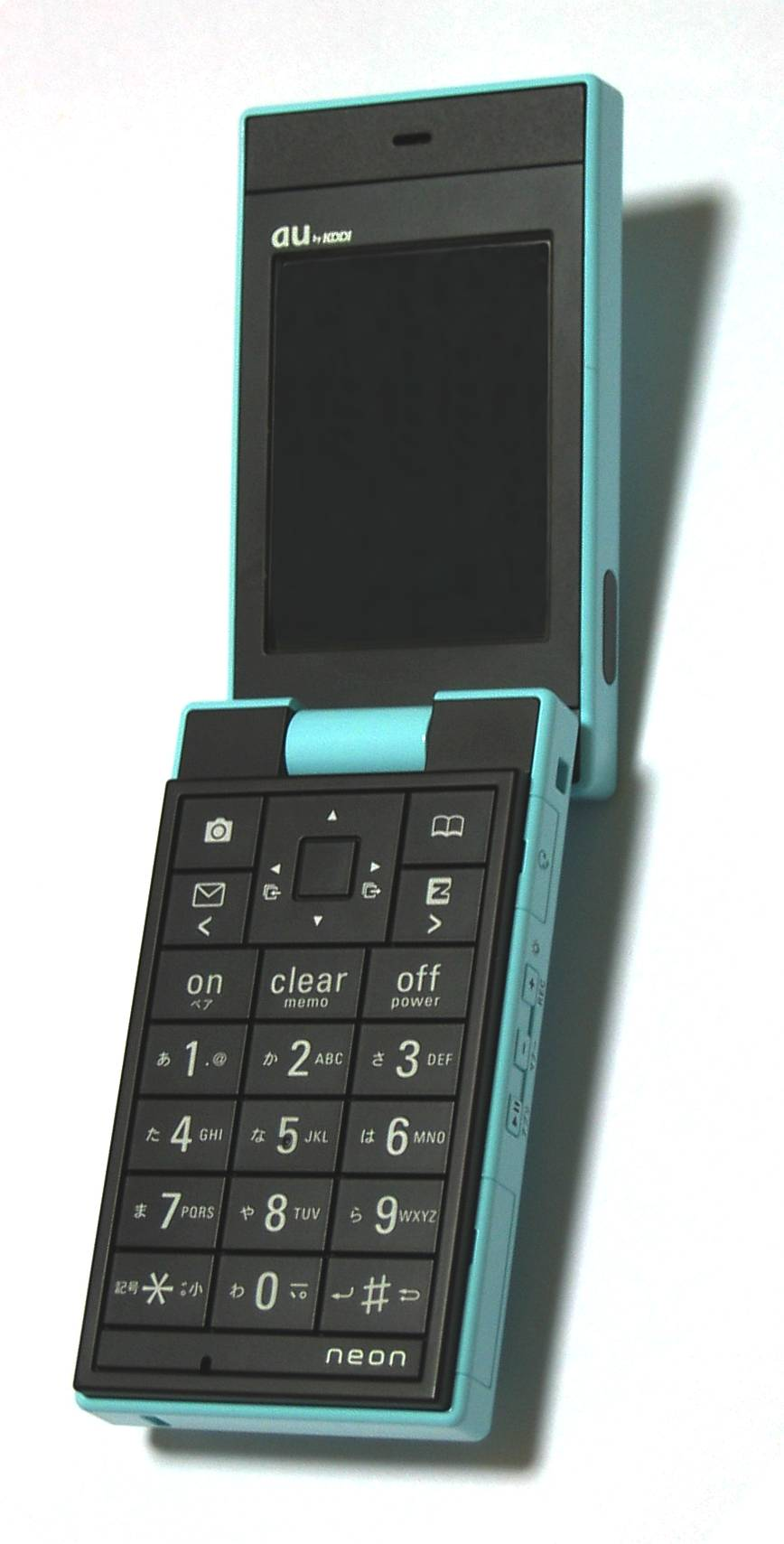
neon (Phone)

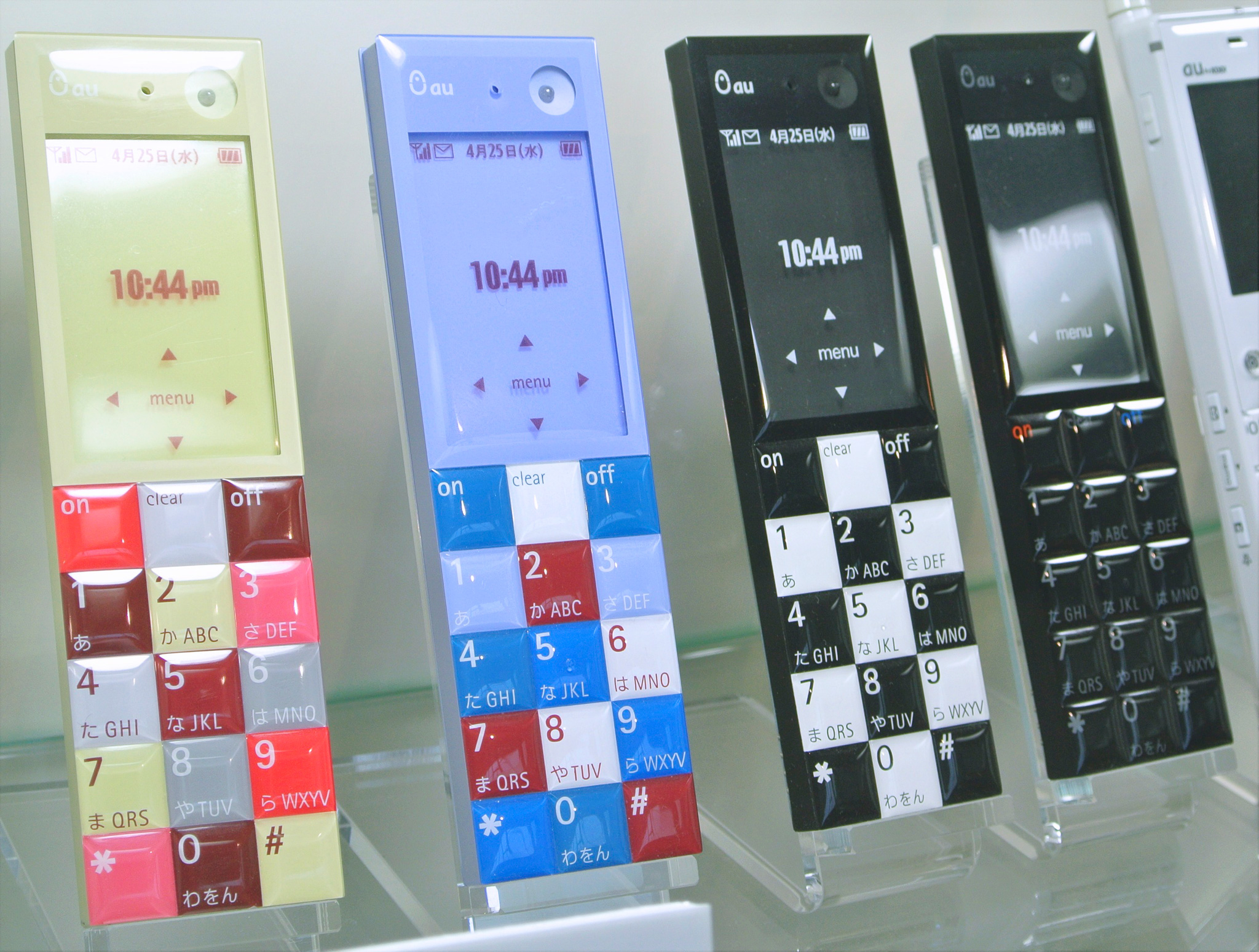
INFOBAR (Phone)

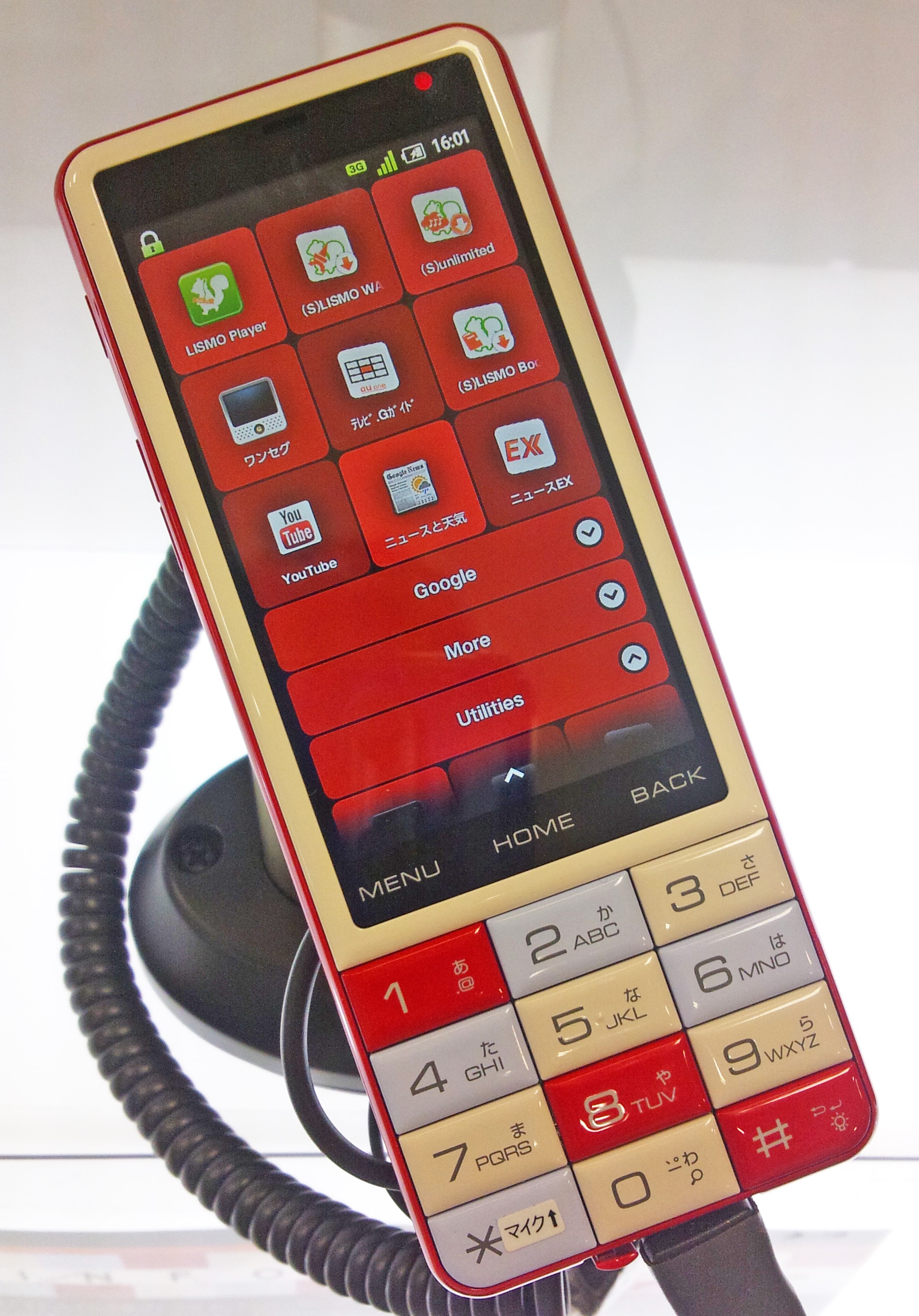
INFOBAR C01 (Phone)

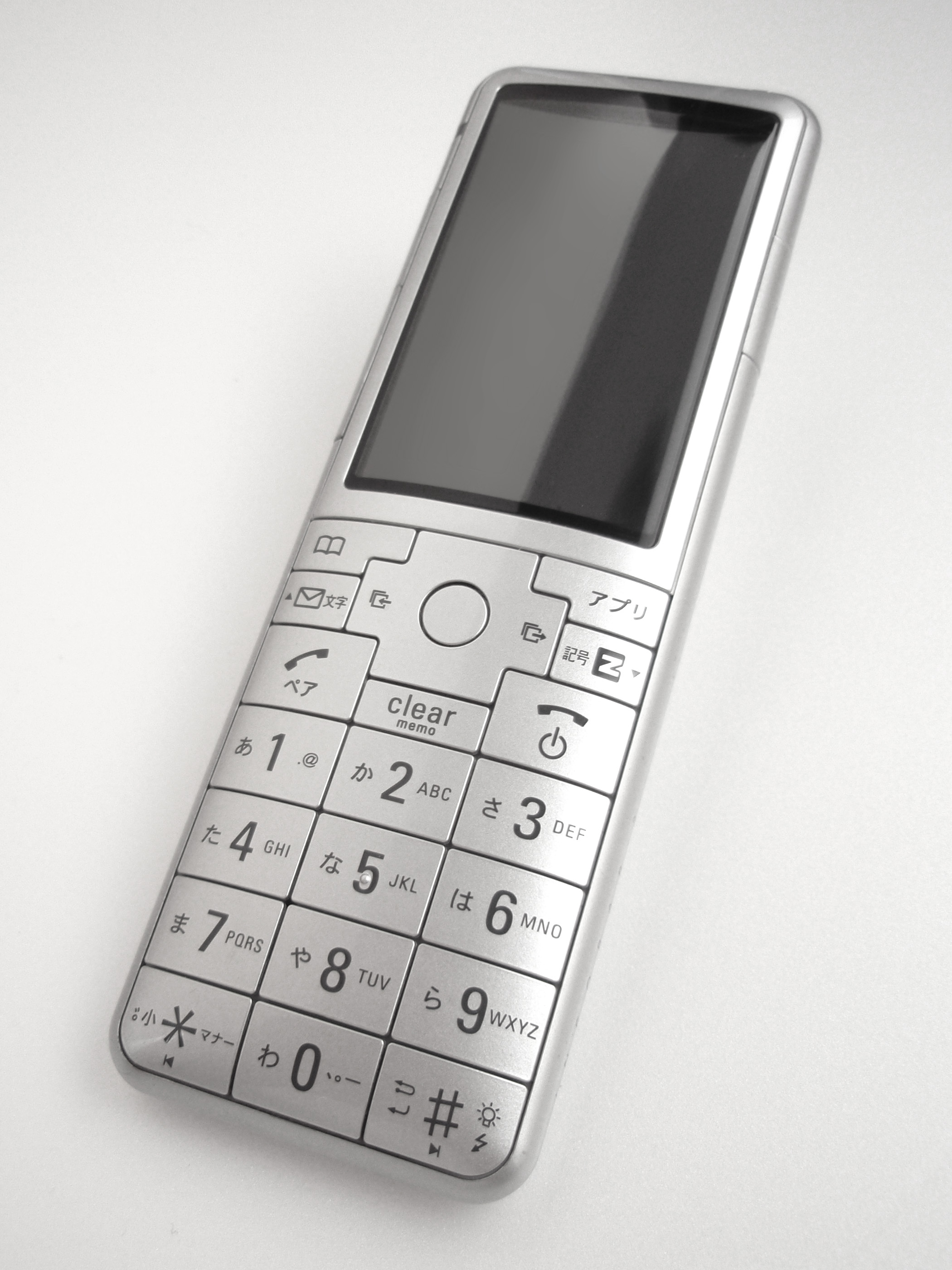
INFOBAR 2 (Phone)

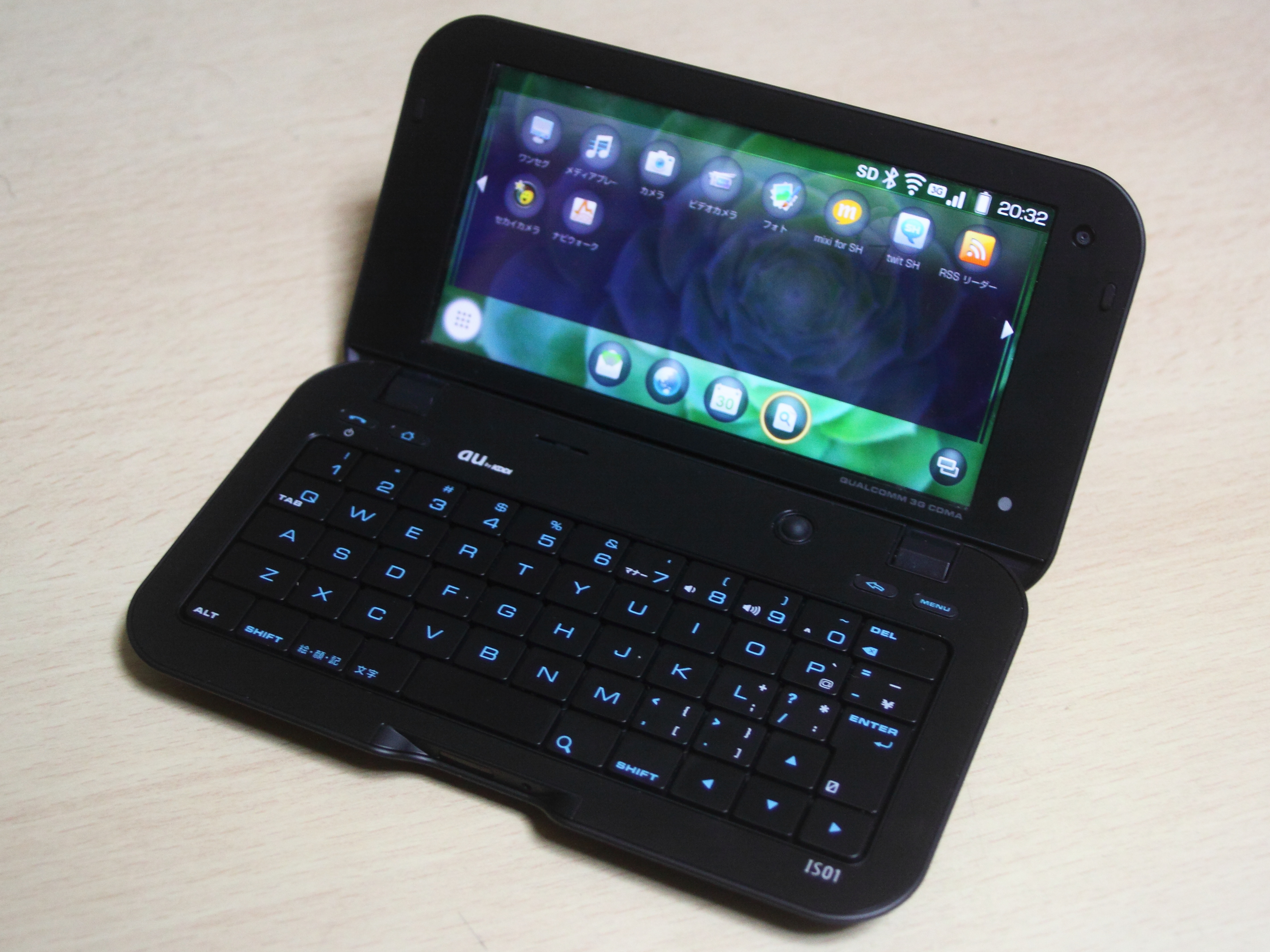
Sharp IS01 (Smartbook)

== Publications ==
- Fukasawa, Naoto; Goto, Takeshi; Sasak, Masato (2004). The Ecological Approach to Design. Japan: Tokyo Shoseki.
- Fukasawa, Naoto (2009). The Outline. Japan: TOTO Shuppan. ISBN 978-4-573-02034-4.
- Fukasawa, Naoto (2014). Naoto Fukasawa. Phaidon Press. ISBN 978-0-7148-6603-1.
- Fukasawa, Naoto (2018). Naoto Fukasawa: Embodiment. Phaidon Press. ISBN 978-0-7148-7607-8.
