= Kazuko Koike =

Kazuko Koike (小池一子, Koike Kazuko; born 1936) is a creative director born in Tokyo. She graduated from the School of Arts, Letters and Sciences, Waseda University, Tokyo, Japan. She is member of the Advisory Board for Muji (“Mujirushi Ryōhin”) since its founding and Professor Emeritus at Musashino Art University in Tokyo.

She is the founder and president of Kitchen Inc., an all-women studio that planned and produced design-related projects (since 1976). She is founder and president of Sagacho Exhibit Space, an alternative space for arts in Saga, Koto-ku, Tokyo (1983–2000). She is editor and author of books including Issey Miyake, East Meets West (Heibonsha, 1978); Kukan no Aura (Aura of Space) (Hakusuisha, 1993); Fashion: Fashion as a Form of Polyhedron (Musashino Art University Press, 2004); Japanese Coloring (Libro, 1981); and Japan Design (Libro, 1984). Major awards include the 1985 Mainichi Design Prize and the 1995 Japan Award for the Promotion of Art and Culture.

In September 2012, she curated the exhibition "Ikko Tanaka and Future/Past/East/West of Design" at 21_21 Design Sight in Tokyo.

In March 2022, her works will be displayed in an exhibition, "Alternative! Kazuko Koike Exhibition -- Soft-Power Movement of Art & Design".

== Works ==
=== Editing/Writing Work ===
- The Heibon Weekly "Weekly Fashion", a magazine (1959)
- Fashion News from Hanae Mori, a tabloid (1966)
- SO-EN, a magazine (1966-77)

=== Translation Work ===
- Through the Flower: My Struggle as a Woman Artist by Judy Chicago (1979, Parco Publishing)
- Eileen Gray: Architect/Designer (1991, Libro Port/2017, Misuzu Shobo)

== Honours ==
- Juzo Itami Award (2022)
- Person of Cultural Merit (2022)
