= Yoshiki Hishinuma =

Japanese fashion designer

- 菱沼良樹
- Born: 1958 (age 67–68); Sendai, Miyagi Prefecture, Japan
- Education: Bunka Fashion College
- Occupation: Fashion designer

Yoshiki Hishinuma (born 1958) is a Japanese fashion designer.

== Early life and career ==
Hishinuma was born in 1958 in Sendai, Miyagi Prefecture, and educated at Bunka Fashion College. His first interest in fashion came about in the third grade, when he collected scraps of felt from around his home to create a patchwork of Mickey Mouse. Hishinuma dropped out of college after winning the Newcomer Prize at the 1983 Mainichi Design Awards, and subsequently worked as an assistant to Issey Miyake for six months afterward. He began his own synonymous fashion label in 1992, and received the Grand Prize at the 1996 Mainichi Awards.

In 1999, Hishinuma became the first living designer to have an exhibition dedicated to them at the Fashion Gallery of the Kunstmuseum Den Haag. In 2015, Hishinuma collaborated with photographer Yoshihito Sasaguchi and makeup artist Rika Matsui for a multi-media exhibition entitled MAYUPO: A Robot Dreams of Apple Trees, which was featured at the Salone del Mobile. In 2022, one of Hishinuma's dresses was featured as a part of the Museum of FIT's Reinvention and Restlessness: Fashion in the Nineties exhibit in New York, New York.

== Personal life ==
Hishinuma has a wife, Hisae.
