= Emeco =

American furniture manufacturing company

Electric Machine and Equipment Company (Emeco)
- Type: Private
- Industry: Designer furniture
- Founded: 1944; 82 years ago
- Founder: Wilton C. Dinges
- Headquarters: Hanover, Pennsylvania
- Key people: Gregg Buchbinder, CEO and owner
- Products: Chairs, side-tables
- Website: Emeco.net

Emeco is a privately held company based in Hanover, Pennsylvania. The Emeco 1006, known as the Navy Chair, has been in continuous production since the 1940s. Today, Emeco manufactures furniture designed by notable designers and architects such as Philippe Starck, Norman Foster, and Frank Gehry.

== History ==
Wilton C. Dinges founded the Electric Machine and Equipment Company (Emeco) in 1944 with $300 in savings and a used lathe for machine-work. He started bidding on government manufacturing contracts out of a loft in Baltimore, Maryland, beginning with experimental antennas and jet engine parts. Dinges moved to Hanover, Pennsylvania in 1946 in order to take advantage of the local labor market. He obtained 10,000 pounds of aluminum scrap metal at an attractive price and started using it to build dining table legs. Later Emeco manufactured chair frames and eventually focused completely on aluminum chairs in 1948. The Emeco 1006 Navy Chair for which the company is known was one of several furniture products made out of anodized aluminum, such as bunks and lockers, that Emeco made for the US Navy's fleet during World War II. The business grew by under-bidding other manufacturers on government contracts for office building furniture. By 1953, there were four Emeco factories in Hanover.

By 1955, Emeco was producing 200,000 chairs per year. Dinges developed the chairs and Emeco's manufacturing process, but he was not a good businessman and due to the elaborate manufacturing process, found it hard to generate a profit. By 1979 the company was not receiving enough new government contracts to stay in business and was nearing bankruptcy.

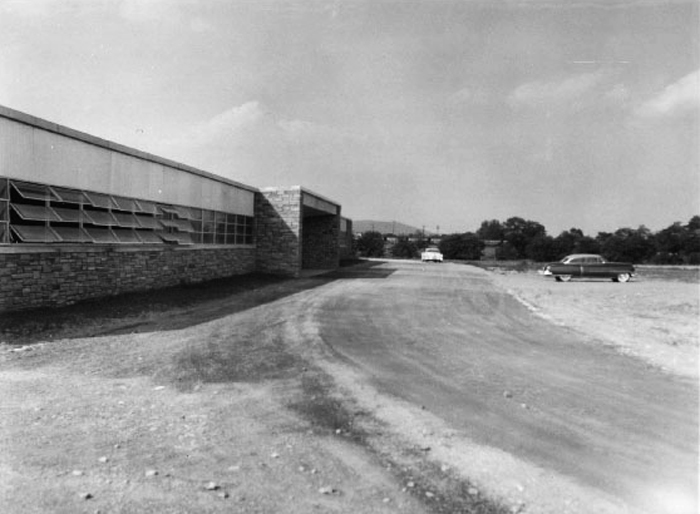
Emeco factory in Hanover, Pennsylvania (1940s)

Emeco was sold that year to Jay Buchbinder who tried unsuccessfully to revive the military end of the business. Buchbinder's son, Gregg, acquired Emeco from his father in 1998. He noticed that Giorgio Armani and other designers showed an interest in the 1006 chair, so he decided to focus on those and similar products. In 1999 the company posted a profit for the first time in more than 20 years. Gregg met French designer Philippe Starck at the 1998 International Contemporary Furniture Fair (ICFF) and the two agreed to collaborate on numerous designer versions of the 1006 Navy chair. By 2004 these accounted for half of Emeco's production, or 46,500 chairs per year.

A short documentary film called "The 77 Steps of Making an Emeco Chair" by the grandson of designers Charles and Ray Eames shows the industrial processes and craftsmanship required to manufacture the Navy Chair.

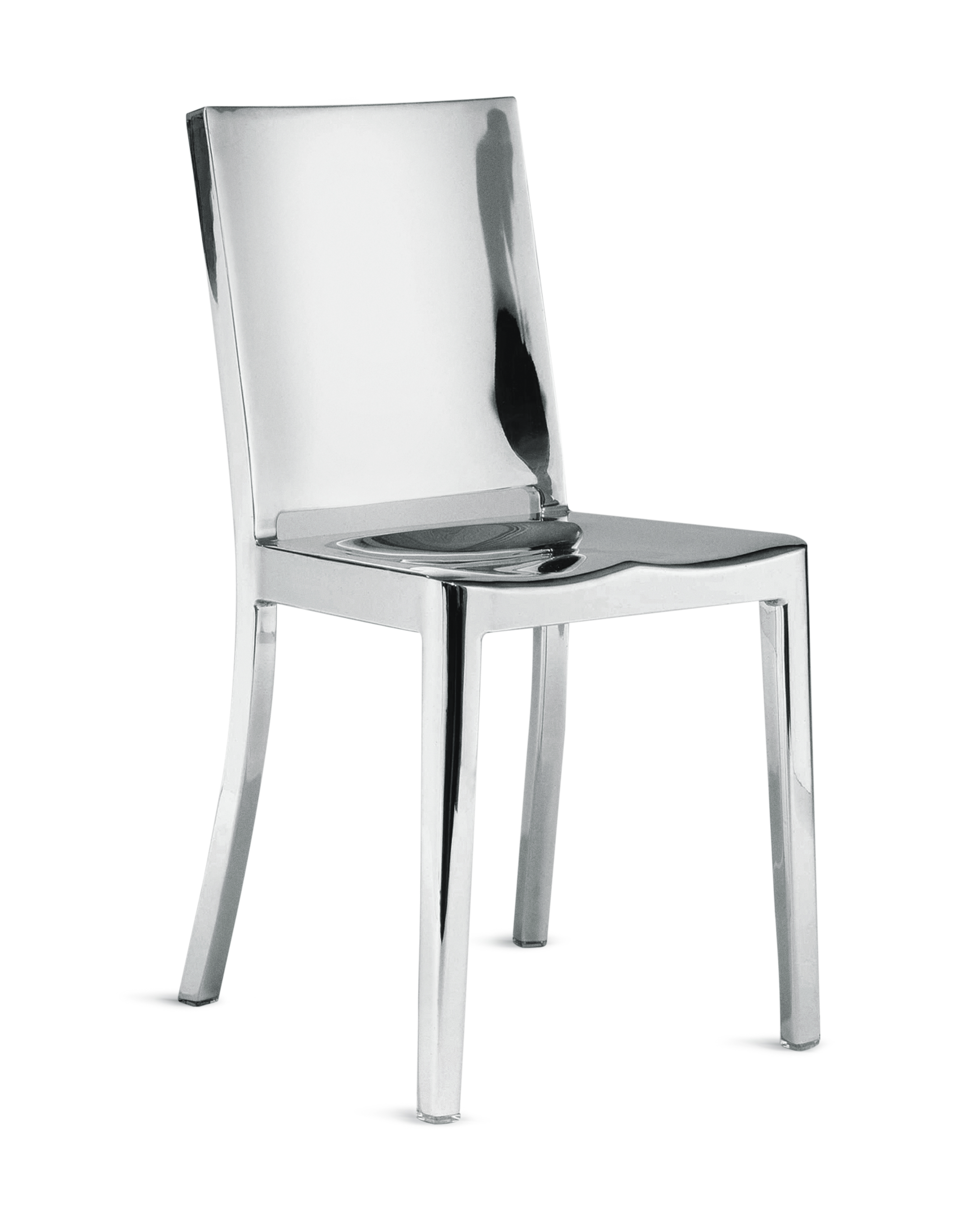
Hudson chair designed by Philippe Starck (2000)

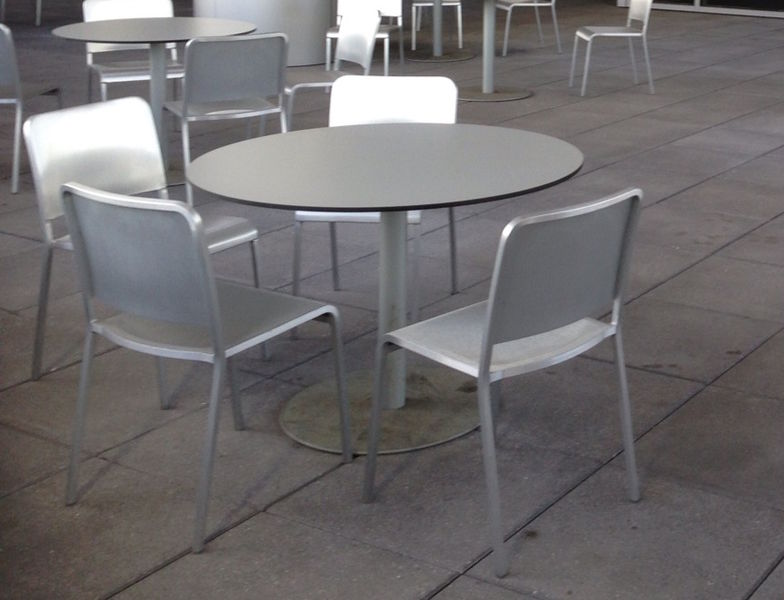
20-06 by Norman Foster

== Famous designers and starchitects ==
In addition to architects Gehry, Starck, and Lord Foster, Emeco has collaborated with many other famous architects and designers such as Ronan & Erwan Bouroullec, Naoto Fukasawa, Barber Osgerby, Jasper Morrison, Sam Hecht and Kim Colin, Nendo, Konstantin Grcic, Adrian Van Hooydonk (BMW Designworks), Michael Young, Jean Nouvel, Christophe Pillet, Andrée Putman, and Ettore Sottsass.

== Use of recycled and reclaimed materials ==
Emeco is noted for their use of recycled and reclaimed materials.

The Coca-Cola Company and Emeco partnered to re-create the Navy Chair using rPET plastic bottles; the 111 Navy Chair became available in 2010.

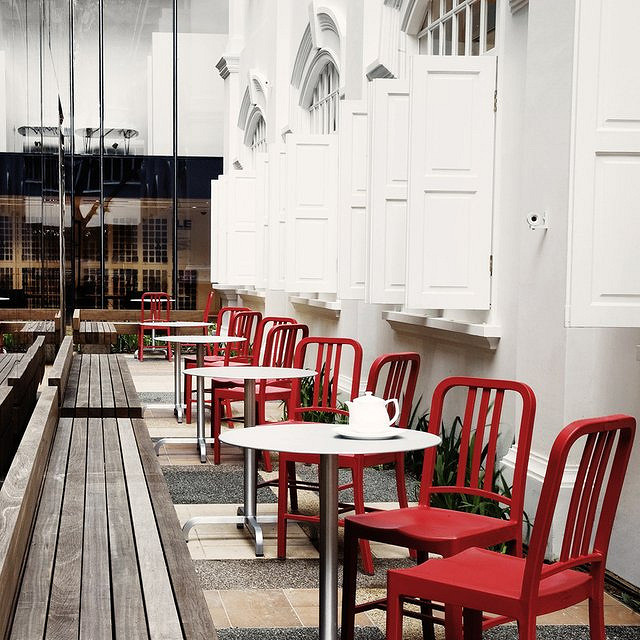
111 Navy chairs

Philippe Starck and Emeco revived and reengineered a 2001 design so that it could be made using a formula that combines waste polypropylene and reclaimed wood fiber. The result, called the Broom Chair, was launched in 2012.

In 2015, the Alfi Chair designed by Jasper Morrison was introduced. The seat of the chair is made of 100% discarded industrial waste – 92.5% polypropylene and 7.5% wood fiber.

A 2022 advanced product design course in collaboration with the MIT Department of Architecture led to the development of "The next 150-year chair".

== Legal actions ==
=== Restoration Hardware ===
In October 2012, Emeco filed a lawsuit against Restoration Hardware for allegedly violating their trademark and trade dress by selling look-alikes of the Emeco Navy chair, which Restoration Hardware called the “Naval Chair”. Restoration Hardware renamed the chair, then removed them from their website. In January 2013, Restoration Hardware agreed to stop selling the disputed chairs and to recycle their existing stock.

=== IKEA ===
Emeco filed a design right and copyright infringement case against Swedish furniture giant IKEA in 2015, alleging that IKEA’s Melltorp dining chair was similar to the Emeco 20-06 Stacking Chair designed by Norman Foster in 2006. In May 2016 Emeco accepted an out-of-court settlement from IKEA, both companies issued a joint statement announcing that a deal had been reached. Details of the deal remain confidential.

== Awards ==
- 2000 Good Design Award, Hudson Chair by Philippe Starck
- 2010 Good Design Award, 111 Navy Chair® (in collaboration with Coca-Cola)
- 2011 iF Design Award, 111 Navy Chair® (in collaboration with Coca-Cola)
- 2014 iF Design Award, Parrish chair by Konstantin Grcic
- 2020 Core77 Design Award, On & On Collection by Barber Osgerby
- 2021 Inaugural ELLE Decor Earth Award
- 2022 Wallpaper* Design Award, Za stools by Naoto Fukasawa
- 2022 Core77 Design Award, Student Notable Furniture & Lighting Award, Bethany Mumford, Savannah College of Art and Design (Inspired by Emeco)

== See also ==
- Interview with Gregg Buchbinder (by Grant Gibson)
- A Sustainable Seat: The Alfi Chair (Cooper Hewitt Museum, New York)
- Hudson Chair, The Hudson (Museum of Modern Art, New York)
- Superlight chair (2004) (San Francisco Museum of Modern Art)
- GoodForm (1931–32) (Vitra Design Museum)
- Leslie Gehry Brenner Award of the Hereditary Disease Foundation (HDF)
