= Ikko Tanaka =

Japanese graphic designer (1930–2002)

- 田中 一光
- Born: 13 January 1930; Nara, Empire of Japan
- Died: 10 January 2002 (aged 71); Tokyo, Japan
- Education: Kyoto City University of Arts
- Occupation: Graphic designer
- Awards: Mainichi Design Prize (1966, 1973); Asahi Prize (1997); Yusaku Kamekura Design Award (1999); Person of Cultural Merit (2000)

Ikko Tanaka (田中 一光, Tanaka Ikkō; January 13, 1930 – January 10, 2002) was a Japanese graphic designer.

Tanaka is widely recognized for his prolific body of interdisciplinary work, which includes graphic identity and visual matter for brands and corporations including Seibu Department Stores, Mazda, Issey Miyake, Hanae Mori, and Expo 85. He is credited with developing the foundational graphic identity for lifestyle brand Muji, emphasizing the "no brand" quality of their products through unadorned, charming line drawings paired with straightforward slogans. His use of bold, polychromatic geometries and his harnessing of the dynamic visual potential of typography are undergirded by a sensitivity towards traditional Japanese aesthetics. Though keenly sensitive to historical precedents and established conventions, Tanaka nevertheless maintained a degree of playfulness in his work, manipulating color, scale, and form to reconfigure familiar iconographies into fresh and accessible visual representations.

Tanaka is also widely recognized for his posters designs for Noh productions and other performances and exhibitions staged in Japan and beyond. He was active in realms of typography, exhibition design, and book design as well, and his publication Japan Style was released in 1980 alongside the Victoria and Albert Museum exhibition of the same name. As a leading figure in postwar Japanese design, Tanaka is also credited with playing a role in the professionalization and expansion of the discipline.

== Career ==
=== Education and early beginnings (1930-1957) ===
Born in 1930 in Nara, Ikko Tanaka studied art at the Kyoto City University of Arts, graduating in 1950 with a degree in ancient Japanese art. He began his professional career in the department of textile design at the Kanegafuchi Boseki (now Kracie Holdings) firm in Osaka, working under the direction of French-trained designer Katsujiro Kinoshita. Seeking a more print-focused design career, Tanaka started working at the Osaka-based Sankei Shimbun in 1952. Despite intending to take on a position in the Department of Graphic Design, he was relegated to performing clerical work in the office. Frustrated and listless, he began painting posters for performances at the newspaper’s theatre and pasted them in the lobby of the building. The renegade works caught the attention of avant-garde artist Jiro Yoshihara, a future Gutai leader who at the time was working on a fashion show for Sankei that was slated to tour the country as part of a publicity effort for the newspaper. Charmed by the designs, Yoshihara offered Tanaka a job designing the sets for the events, and upon completion of the successful tour, Tanaka was promoted to the Department of Graphic Design. Tanaka continued to work at Sankei through 1957, and in 1954 received the Japan Advertising Arts Club (JAAC) Members' Prize.

=== Move to Tokyo and career development (1957-2002) ===
Inspired by the seminal "Graphic '55" exhibition held at the Takashimaya department store in Tokyo, which featured several leading first-generation graphic designers including Yusaku Kamekura, Yoshio Hayakawa, and Ryuichi Yamashiro, Tanaka moved to Tokyo in 1957 and took up a position at advertising agency Light Publicity. He established his eponymous studio in 1963 in Aoyama. With the support of critic Masaru Katsumi, who coordinated many large-scale domestic and international graphic design exhibitions, Tanaka gained access to important platforms such as the World Design Conference, and received widespread exposure after being selected as the cover artist for the inaugural issue of Graphic Design in 1958.

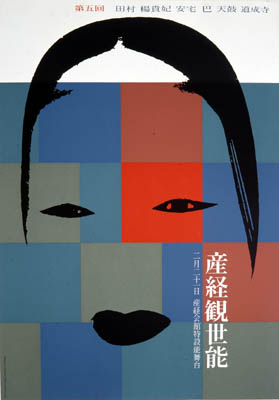
Poster by Ikko Tanaka for the "5th Sankei Kanze Noh" performance in 1958.

In December 1960, Tanaka took his first overseas trip to the United States and connected with several graphic design contemporaries including Saul Bass, Aaron Burns, Herb Lubalin, Ivan Chermayeff, Lou Dorfsman, and Pieter Brattinga. Brattinga invited Tanaka to deliver a lecture at the Pratt Institute, where he taught, and in 1965 organized a solo exhibition of Tanaka's work at Steendrukkerij de Jong & Co. in Hilversum, the Netherlands. Tanaka quickly rose to prominence and received numerous awards including the Japan Advertising Arts Club (JAAC) Members' Prize in 1959 and the Gold Medal of the Tokyo Art Directors’ Club in 1960. Tanaka also played a vital role in the professionalization of graphic design in Japan, and worked for the newly founded Nippon Design Center in the 1960s, a house agency geared towards corporations that sought to establish higher standards for advertising design. He remained active in the design world until his death in 2002, producing an immense portfolio of work that spanned the private and public sectors, and engaged with numerous forms of media in varying scales and dimensions.

== Work ==
=== Style ===
Though Tanaka's work is by no means monolithic and predictable, his overall sensibilities reveal interests in the potential for negative space to express matter, contoured forms, bold and simple geometries in novel arrangements, and vivid swaths of color, often rendered in opaque treatments. His clean and precise applications of color and contour recall the defined forms of Edo period woodblock prints, while his spatial arrangements link to the recursive patterns of contemporaneous Op art, and the earlier playful, scattered geometries found in Bauhaus graphic design.

Tanaka's style is often linked to the Rinpa school of painting, which originated in Kyoto in the 17th century and continued to develop and periodically resurface through the 18th and 19th centuries. These artists privileged decorative designs and vibrant colors, often depicting native flora and fauna against a gold-leaf ground. Tanaka's use of motifs borrowed from the natural world, and his placement of forms against monochromatic backgrounds has been described by art historian Yuji Yamashita as a 20th-century iteration of Rinpa, to such an extent that he could be considered "the very person that embodied Rinpa." Tanaka himself acknowledged the influence of Rinpa on his work, while simultaneously expressing a reluctance to wholly align with an aesthetic that "purveys an idea of beauty that’s far too far away from what we are." Tanaka maintained a careful balance between traditional and modern in his work, and actively drew inspiration from the mass consumer culture of America and precedents in European design, seamlessly integrating these visual languages with motifs and sensibilities drawn from Japanese aesthetics.

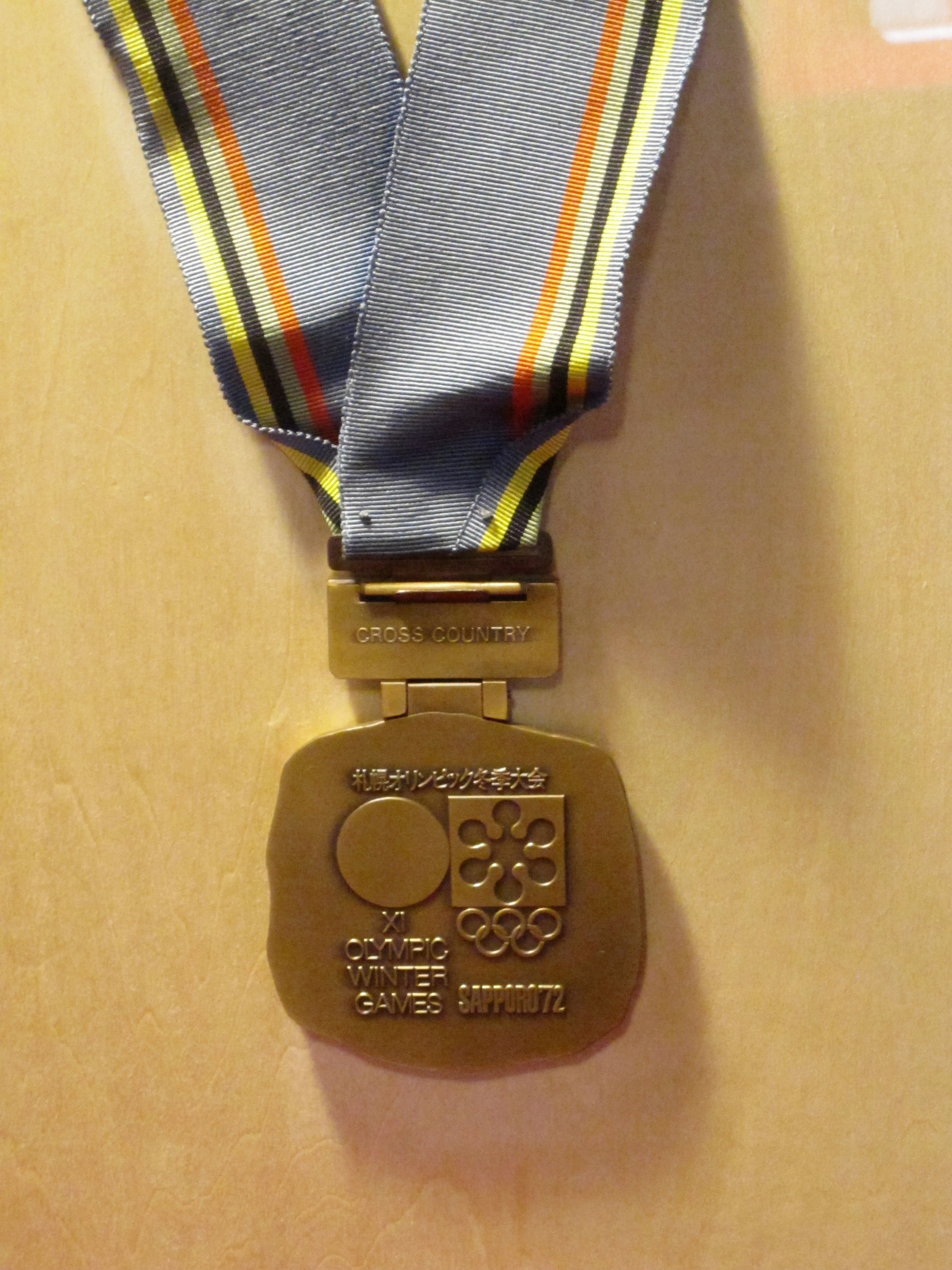
Reverse of the 1972 Sapporo Winter Olympics bronze medal.

=== Theatre and the cultural sector ===
Tanaka's practice intersected with numerous creative fields, and his interest in interdisciplinary collaboration can be traced back to his early days in Kyoto, where he was involved with set design and make-up for the Atelierza student theatre group, working alongside designers such as Hiroshi Awatsuji and Kikuko Ogata. He has spoken of his interest in the artistry and performance of the Japanese tea ceremony, likening his position as a designer to that of a tea host—roles that engage in transient processes and act as mediators between private interests and public audiences. These ideas percolate into his extensive work relating to theatre and other performing arts, and Tanaka played a critical role in the popular revival of Noh in the postwar era. By shifting the print matter associated with Noh performances from esoteric handwritten slips of paper to public-facing, bold posters that translated the enigmatic and profound qualities of the medium in more accessible and visually captivating terms, Tanaka helped bring the traditional art into the modern age without sacrificing its core aesthetic and cultural qualities.

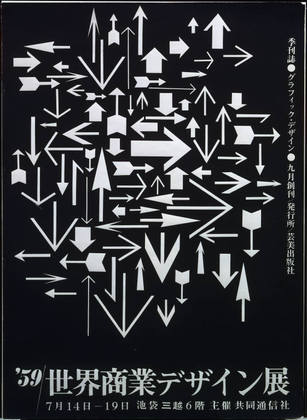
Poster for the 1959 World Commercial Design Exhibition in Tokyo.

Tanaka also produced promotional graphics for art exhibitions, music performances, and numerous cultural and industrial expositions, including Expo '70 in Osaka, Expo '85 in Tsukuba, and the World City Expo Tokyo '96. He designed the main logo of Osaka University and created notable posters for Hiroshima Appeals (1988) and Amnesty International. Tanaka also designed signage and medals for the 1964 Summer Olympics in Tokyo, and the 1972 Winter Olympics in Sapporo.

=== Commercial ===
In 1975, Tanaka was appointed creative director of the Seibu group, a holding company that encompasses railways, department stores, real estate, and numerous other industries under its umbrella. His work with Seibu had begun in 1973, when he was commissioned to make posters for performances at the Seibu Theater. As creative director, Tanaka was involved in a range of design projects that defined the company's visual presence: he produced iconic graphic designs including the green and blue target pattern used on the wrapping paper and shopping bags of the Seibu department store while also participating in the interior design of exhibitions, window displays, lobbies, and restaurants. Tanaka also produced logos for other Seibu subsidiaries including Loft and Credit Saison.

Together with marketing consultant Kazuko Koike and interior designer Takashi Sugimoto, Tanaka conceptualized the graphic identity for Mujirushi Ryōhin, a Seibu group discount brand founded as a response and respite to late capitalism’s brand-oriented culture. Tanaka proposed the use of recycled paper for the product packaging, and a simple logo printed in maroon, featuring the four kanji characters of the brand written in bold font. As part of the company’s advisory board, Tanaka also played a vital role in product design, advocating for the embrace of the natural textures and colors of metal and wood materials, and pushing back against the use of pigments in synthetic plastics.

=== Book design and typography ===
Tanaka collaborated with historians, curators, architects and artists throughout his career to produce art publications, exhibition designs, and promotional materials. Notable books include Japan Style (1980) with Yoshida Mitsukuni, published in conjunction with the exhibition of the same title at the Victoria and Albert Museum, Japan Color (1981) with Kazuko Koike, and Japan Design (1984) also with Kazuko Koike. These book design projects waned in the 1980s and 90s as publishers began to shift towards a less stylized, more packaged and industrial approach to literary production. Tanaka also published his own writings in texts such as The Surroundings of Design (Dezain no shuhen) (1980) and an autobiography, Ikko Tanaka: Design of Our Age (Tanaka Ikko jiden: Warera dezain no jidai) (2001).

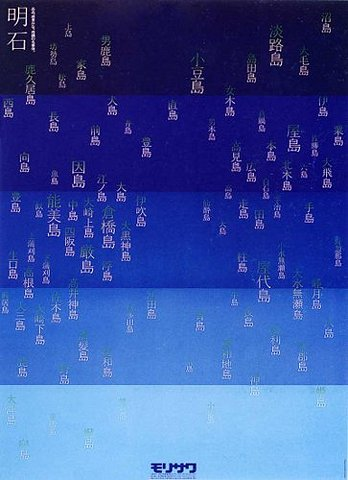
A poster by Tanaka that illustrates the designer's use of text as a graphic, self-referential medium. Here, the names of Japanese islands are themselves isolated and varied in scale, alluding to their physical status as floating landmasses.

Typography figures prominently in Tanaka's work, and his engagement with the medium fell in line with a growing interest in the visual potential of text among young Japanese designers in the postwar era. This impulse was in part shaped by the influences of Swiss and American typography. Prior to the 1950s, typography in Japanese graphic design was largely hand-lettered, either by compass and ruler or by brushwork. Designers including Tanaka sought to establish "nihon moji," a lettering aesthetic that would be recognized as uniquely Japanese and systematically standardized. Tanaka was particularly struck by the prominence of text in the visual language of American mass consumerism, and took an approach to graphic design that would treat text as a central mode of visual communication, rather than operating as a mere prosthetic to the image. A series of prints produced for type foundry Morisawa exemplify Tanaka's engagement with the visual expressiveness of letters. In one piece, he separates different stroke types into discrete forms that fill the surface of the picture plane, abstracting them from their original kanji contexts, while another work makes use of archaic pictogram characters, printed in white with a chalk-like texture against a black background.

Later in his career, he developed a Bodoni-inspired Mincho typeface called kōchō, which makes use of strong contrasts between thick and thin strokes, triangular uroko (serifs), and full osae (pressure).

=== Fashion ===
Beginning in the late 1960s and 70s, Tanaka engaged in collaborative work with several Japanese fashion designers. Tanaka designed Hanae Mori's iconic butterfly logo and produced a body of visual matter for the line, including a documentary on the fashion designer intended for foreign distribution. Tanaka's 1979 design for Issey Miyake's line, an "IM" motif previously used for non-clothing products, was brought back to life in 2021 as the logo for the company's new "IM Men" line (replacing the discontinued "Issey Miyake Men" line). In the late 1990s, Tanaka designed promotional posters for Salvatore Ferragamo and produced exhibition materials and designed the catalogue for "Salvatore Ferragamo - The Art of Shoe," held at the Sogetsu Kai Foundation in 1998.

== Death and legacy ==
Tanaka died on January 10, 2002, at the age of 71 from a heart attack in Tokyo. In 2008, the Tanaka Ikko Archive was established at the Center for Contemporary Graphic Art (CCGA) in Sukagawa, Fukushima. The expansive collection consists of approximately 2,700 poster works, 3,600 book design works, 9,500 books, 25,000 photographic materials, and 55,000 documents and letters.

Tanaka's work is held in the permanent collections of many museums worldwide, including the USC Pacific Asia Museum, the Walker Art Center, the Museum of Modern Art, the Indianapolis Museum of Art, the University of Michigan Museum of Art, the Cooper Hewitt, the Museum of Applied Arts and Sciences, the British Museum, the Nasher Museum of Art, the Artizon Museum, and the Victoria and Albert Museum.

== Selected awards and exhibitions ==
=== Awards ===
- 1954 Japan Advertising Arts Club (JAAC) Members' Prize
- 1966 Mainichi Design Prize
- 1968 Warsaw International Poster Biennial Silver Award
- 1973 Mainichi Design Prize
- 1973 Kodansha Publishing Book Design Award
- 1986 Art Directors Club of New York Gold Prize
- 1994 Purple Medal of Honor
- 1997 Asahi Prize
- 1999 Yusaku Kamekura Design Award
- 2000 Person of Cultural Merit

=== Exhibitions ===
- 2003 "Ikko Tanaka Retrospective: Our Era of Design," Museum of Contemporary Art Tokyo (exhibition designed by Tadao Ando)
- 2012 "Ikko Tanaka and Future/Past/East/West of Design," 21 21 Design Sight (curated by Kazuko Koike)
- 2015 "Ikko Style: The Graphic Art of Ikko Tanaka," USC Pacific Asia Museum
- 2016 "The Posters of Ikko Tanaka," National Museum of Art, Osaka
- 2018 "Ikko Tanaka: Faces." Die Neue Sammlung
