= Muji =

Japanese retail company

Ryohin Keikaku Co., Ltd.
- Trade name: Mujirushi Ryōhin; Muji
- Native name: 株式会社良品計画
- Romanized name: Kabushiki-gaisha Ryōhin Keikaku
- Type: Public
- Traded as: TYO: 7453
- Industry: Retail
- Founded: 1980
- Headquarters: Koraku, Bunkyō, Tokyo, Japan
- Number of locations: 1188 (2023)
- Key people: Masaaki Kanai (chairman); Satoru Matsuzaki (president)
- Products: Household goods Kitchen utensil Fashion; Stationery; Electronics; Home appliances Cosmetics; Food; Furniture
- Services: Residential Architectural design
- Owners: The Master Trust Bank of Japan (8.70%); Trust & Custody Services Bank (7.73%); Mitsubishi Corporation (4.09%); Credit Saison (2.40%)
- Divisions: Dabbey Muji, Café Muji, Meal Muji, Muji Campsite, florist and home furnishing;
- Website: www.ryohin-keikaku.jp

Ryohin Keikaku Co., Ltd. (株式会社良品計画, Kabushiki-gaisha Ryōhin Keikaku), doing business as Mujirushi Ryōhin (無印良品; lit. 'No Brand Quality Goods'), or Muji is a Japanese retailer which sells a wide variety of household and consumer goods.

== Products and businesses ==
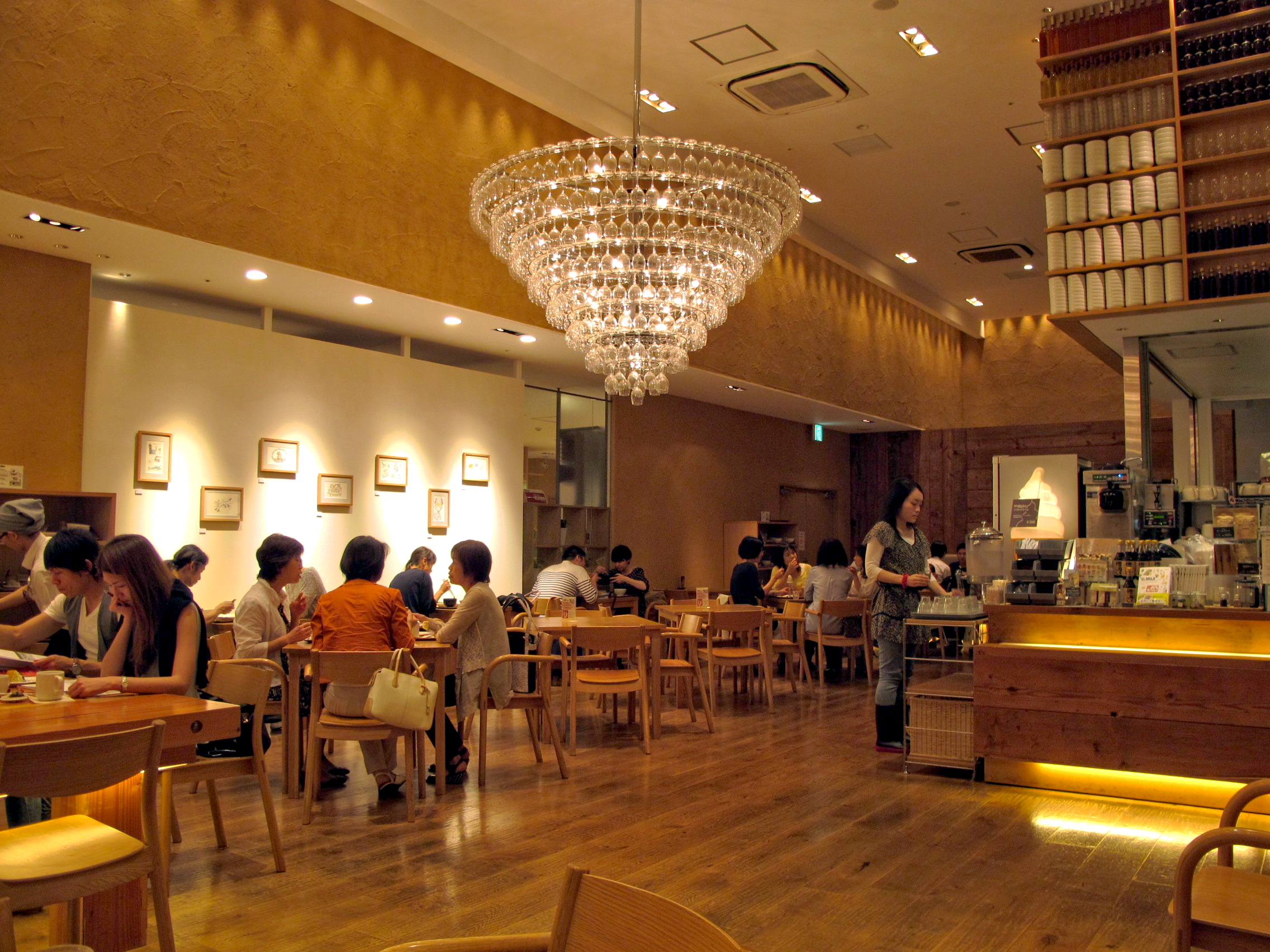
Café&Meal MUJI, in Shinjuku, Tokyo, Japan

Muji started with only 40 products in the 1980s. By the end of the 2000s, Muji was selling more than 7,000 different products.

Some of their products include pens, pencils, notebooks, storage units, apparel, kitchen appliances, food items, and household care products. Muji has also created an automobile. Muji storefronts such as the one in New York are large and stocked with nearly every single product available. The primary business also includes Café Muji, Meal Muji, Muji Campsite, florist and home furnishing; the company has also engaged in architectural projects such as Muji House.

Muji is positioned as a "reasonably priced" brand, keeping the retail prices of products "lower than usual" by the materials it selects, streamlining its manufacturing processes, and minimising packaging. In April 2019, Muji opened its largest Muji store in Ginza, Japan. The company added Atelier Muji Ginza located on the sixth floor.

Muji has opened hotels in Shenzhen, Beijing, and Ginza, Tokyo.

== History ==
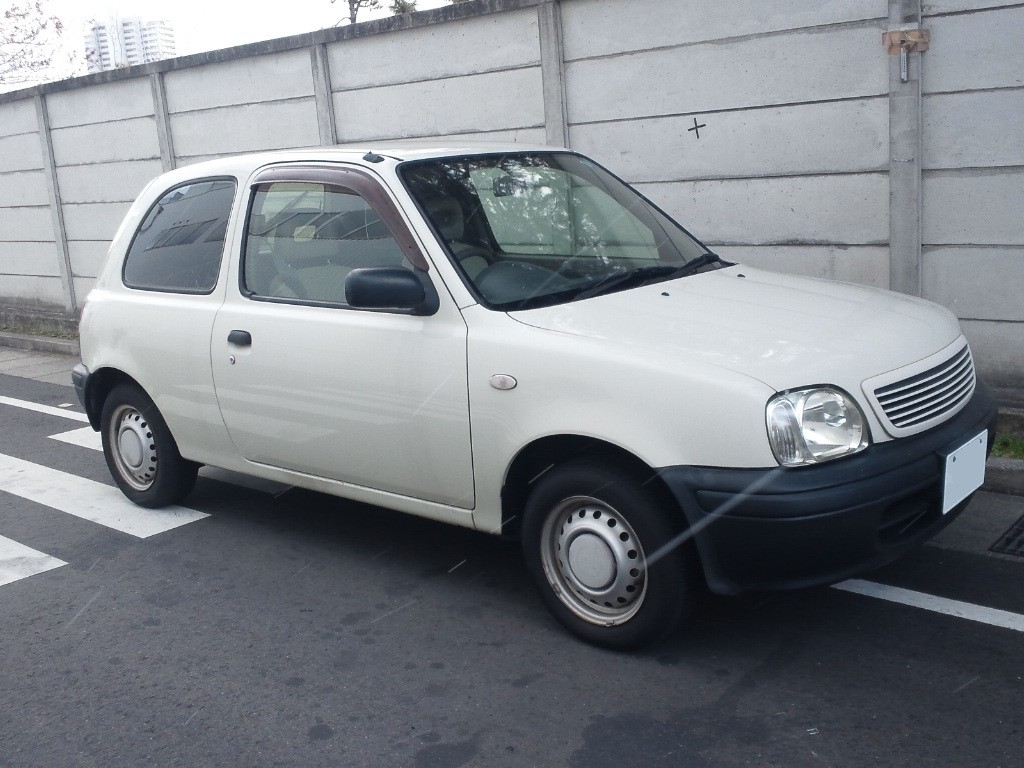
Muji Car 1000, the product of a 2001 collaboration with Nissan

Mujirushi (no-brand) Ryōhin (quality goods) began as a product brand of the supermarket chain The Seiyu, Ltd. in December 1980. The Mujirushi Ryōhin product range was developed to offer affordable quality products and were marketed using the slogan "Lower priced for a reason." Products were wrapped in clear cellophane, plain brown paper labels and red writing. Mujirushi Ryōhin's drive to cut retail prices for consumers saw the company cutting waste by, for example, selling U-shaped spaghetti, the left-over part that is cut off to sell straight spaghetti.

In 1981, Seiji Tsutsumi, the president of the Seiyu Ryutsu group proposed opening a dedicated shop for Mujirushi Ryōhin products. Although the idea was rejected by the directors of Seiyu, the advisory board of the company supported the idea, proposing the idea of a shop positioned against mass production. The company began to develop products that would allow the shop to expand from a supermarket product range to an independent product company. Such products included food, clothing, stationery, and household goods.

In 1983, the first directly operated Mujirushi Ryōhin store opened in Aoyama, Tokyo. In 1985, Mujirushi Ryōhin started overseas production and procurement, began placing direct factory orders in 1986, and in 1987 started developing materials globally.

In 1989, Ryohin Keikaku Ltd became the manufacturer and retailer for all Mujirushi Ryōhin products and operations, including planning, development, production, distribution and sale.

In 1991, Mujirushi Ryōhin opened its first international store in London.

In 1995, shares in "Muji Tsunan Campsite" were registered as over-the-counter shares of Japan Securities Dealers Association. In 1998, Ryōhin Keikaku listed on the second section of the Tokyo Stock Exchange. From 2001 onwards, it was listed on the first section. In April 2001 they issued the Muji Car 1000 (ムジ・カー 1000), a limited release of 1,000 badgeless and decontented Nissan Marches, only available online. Intended as an exercise to test their online marketing systems it was developed together with Nissan. The spartanly equipped little car (with the rear seat upholstered in vinyl, for instance) was only offered in "marble white".

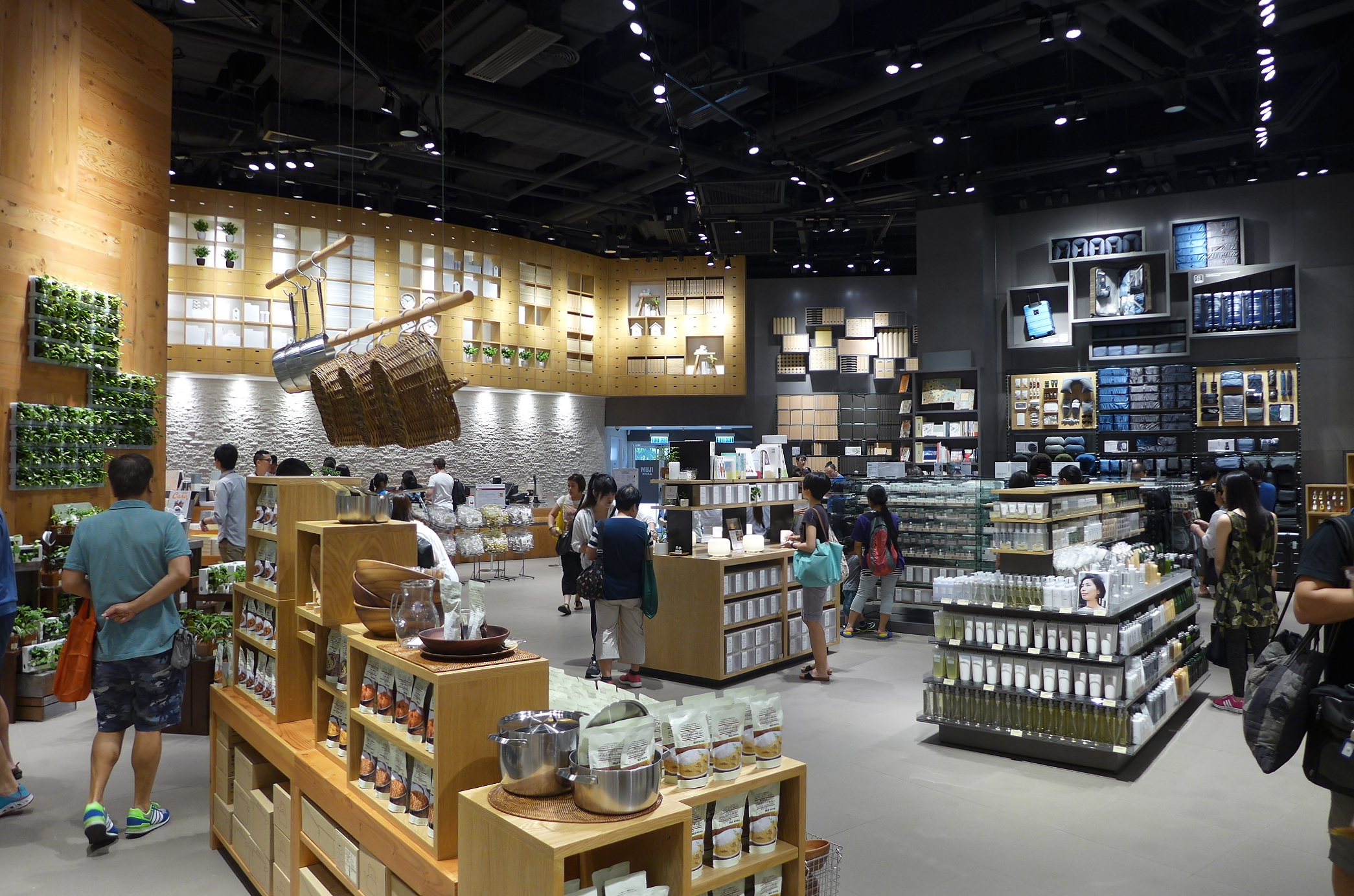
Muji store in Olympian City, Hong Kong.

The brand name "Muji" appears to have been used since around 1999.

In 2011, the first Muji store in Aoyama was redeveloped as a concept store with products from around the world.

In 2020 and 2021, Muji faced scrutiny over the use of cotton produced under conditions of forced labor in Xinjiang. Muji subsequently stopped labelling goods as "Xinjiang cotton" in certain markets, such as Hong Kong. In December 2021, it was reported that the same Muji garments labelled simply as "organic cotton" in the Hong Kong, Taiwanese, and Japanese markets were still being sold by Muji under the "Xinjiang cotton" banner in China.

== Countries of operation ==
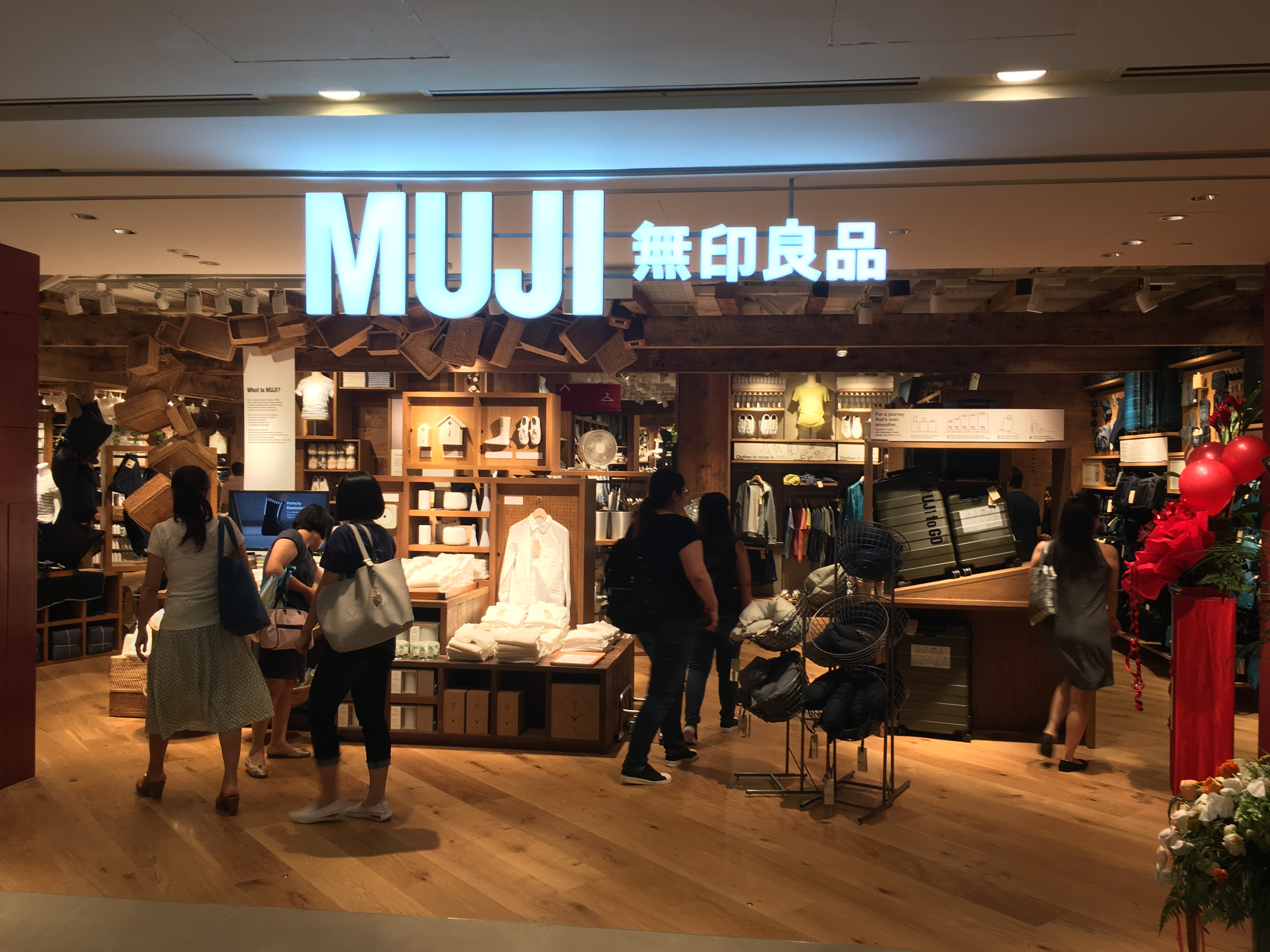
Muji Store in 2017, Plaza Singapura, Singapore.

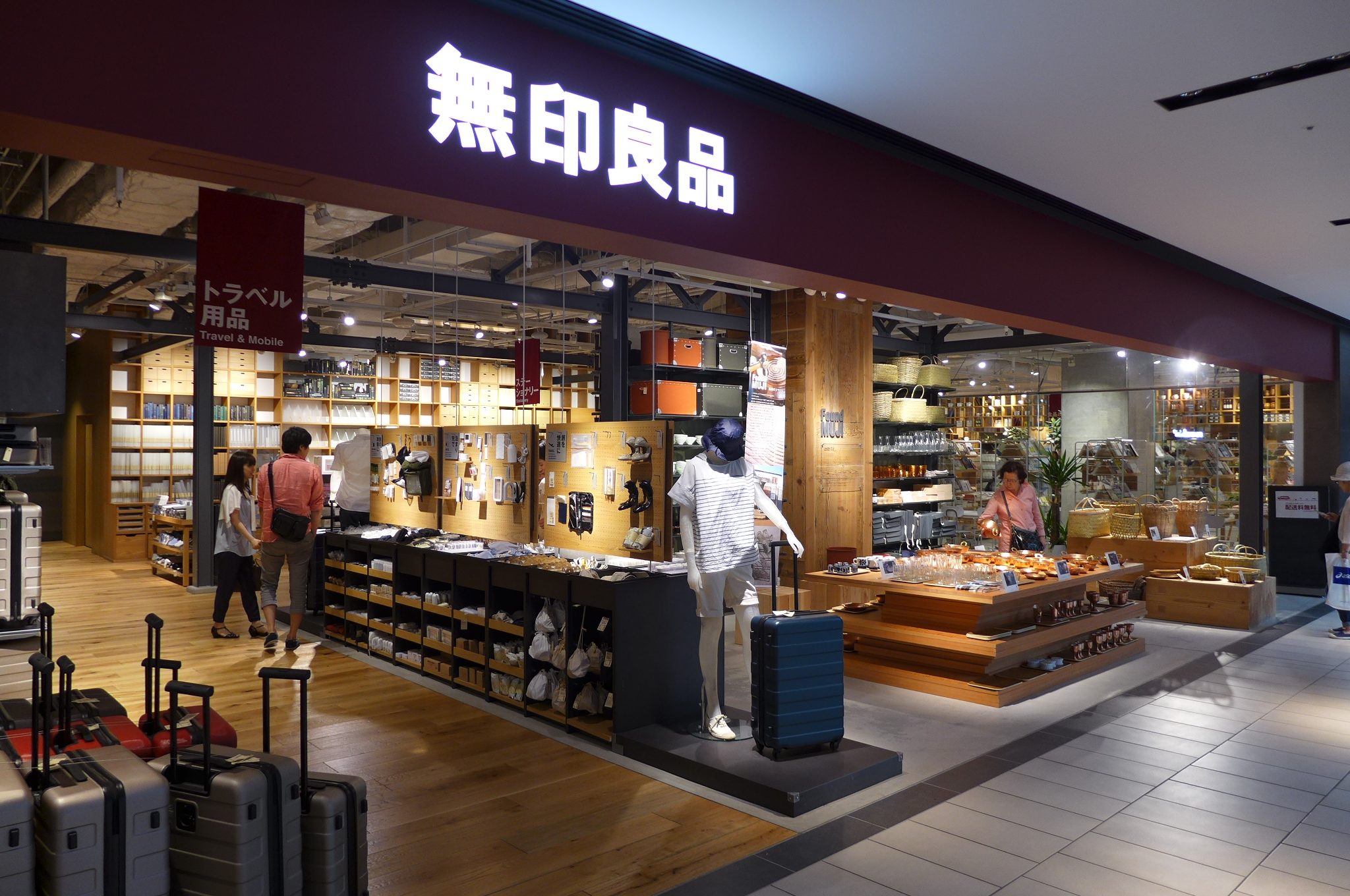
A Muji store in 2014, Grand Front Osaka, Osaka, Japan.

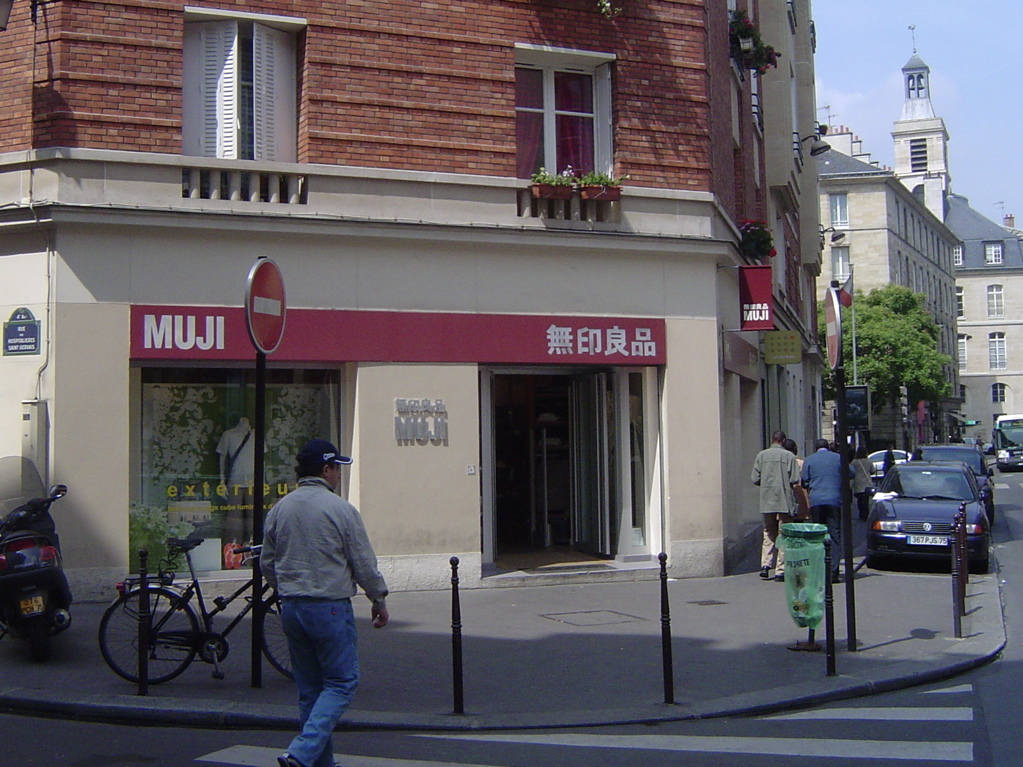
A Muji store in Paris, France.

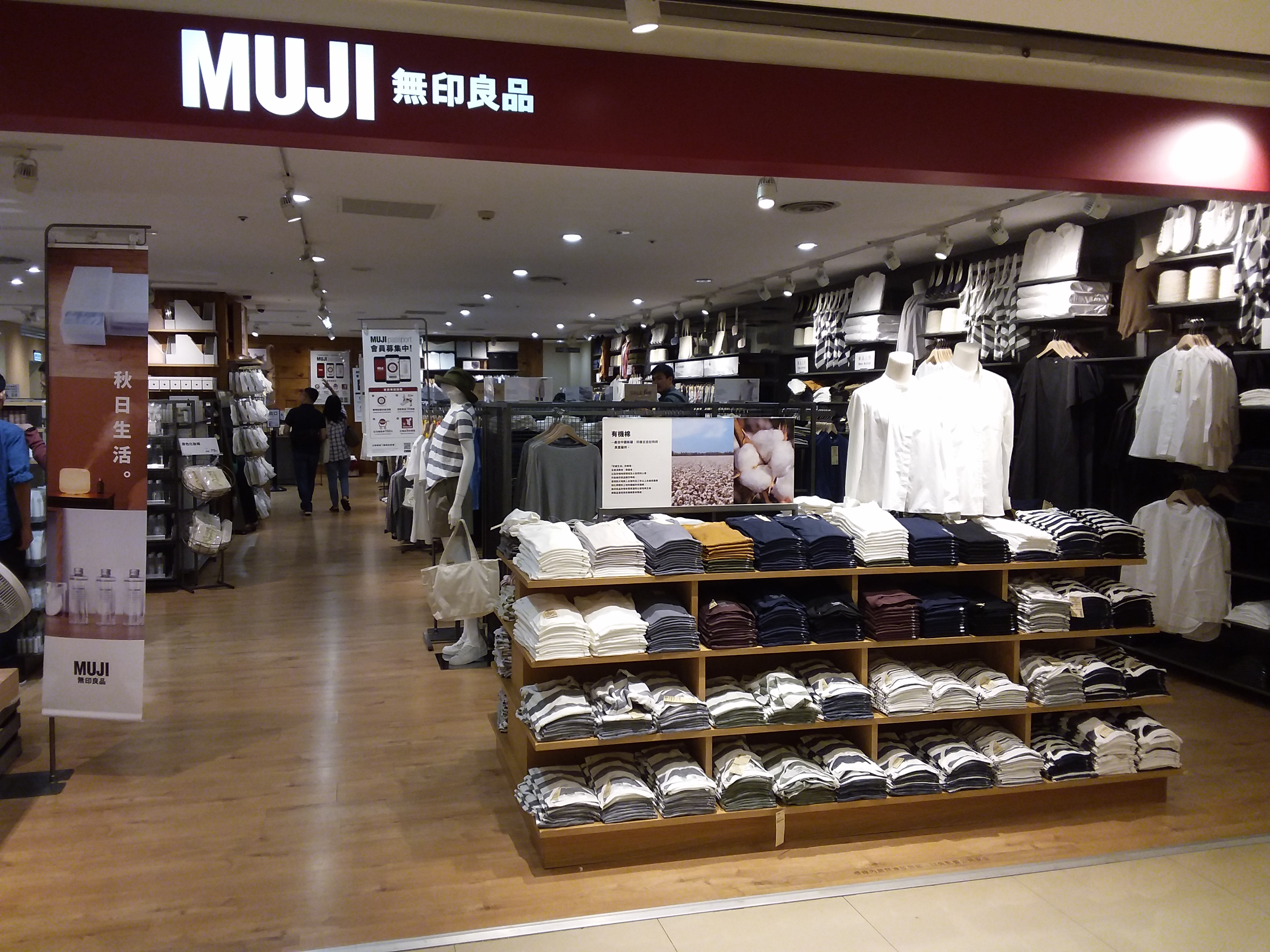
Muji Store in Breeze Center, Taipei, Taiwan

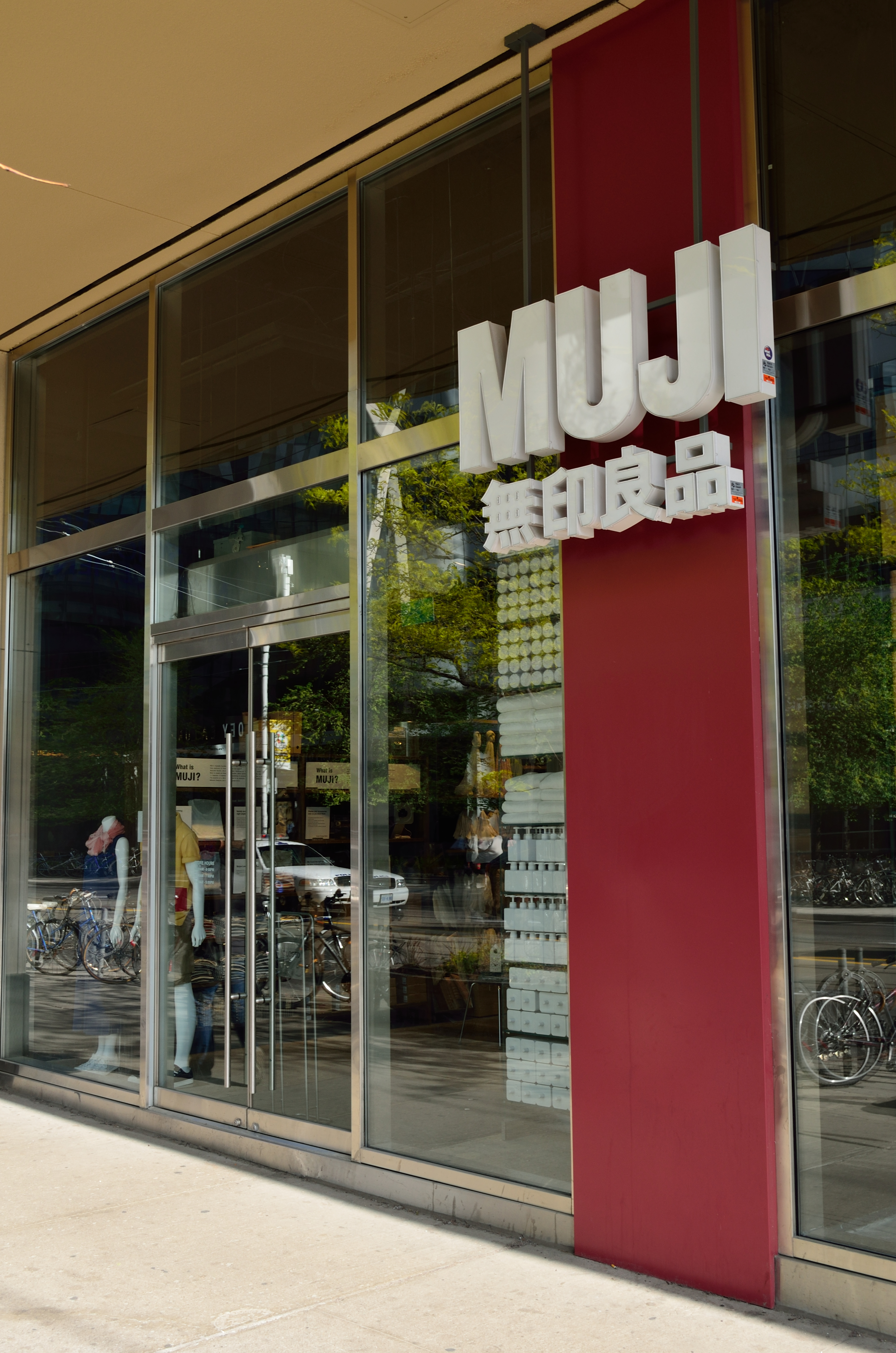
Muji at Atrium on Bay (Toronto, Canada). The store is the largest MUJI store outside Asia.

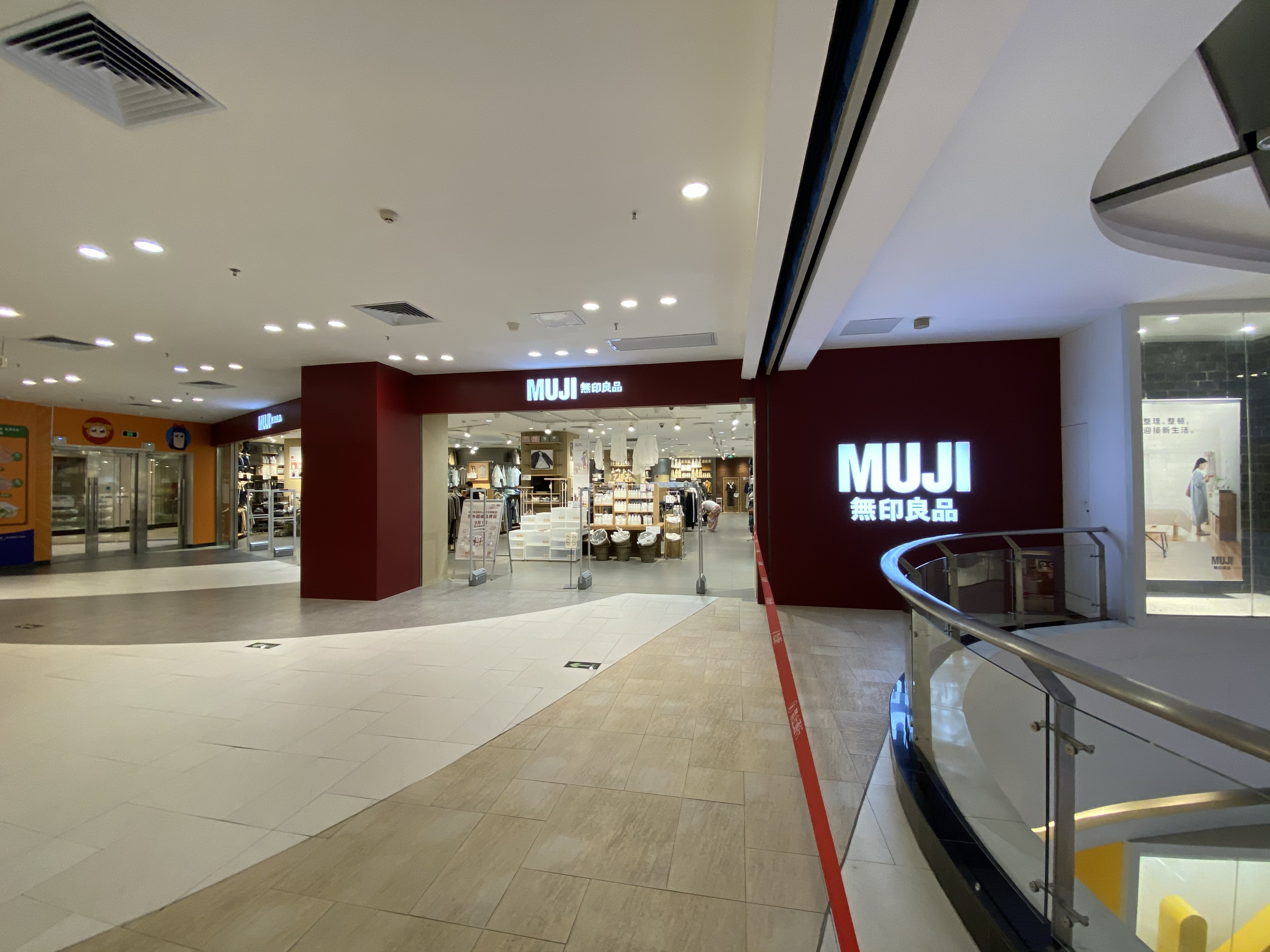
A MUJI store in POPARK, Guangzhou, Mainland China

In Japan, Ryohin Keikaku had 328 directly operated stores, and supplied 124 outlets, as of August 2017. Ryohin Keikaku has three factory outlets at Osaka, Gotenba and Fukuoka.

There were 579 International retail outlets as of August 2022, located in Denmark (1) UK (7), Finland (1), France (6), Italy (5), Germany (7), Ireland (1), Spain (4), Poland (1), Portugal (1), United States (10), Canada (8), Hong Kong (23), Macau (1), Singapore (14), Malaysia (19), South Korea (42), Mainland China (422), Taiwan (70), Thailand (39), Australia (6), Philippines (8), Bahrain (2), Kuwait (3), Qatar (2), Saudi Arabia (3), UAE (8), Oman (1), India (3), Vietnam (3).

Muji had operations in Indonesia, Turkey, Sweden and Switzerland in the past but has closed operations due to its low sales and other circumstances. In July 2026, it announced its withdrawal from Poland after 16 years of operations in the country.

=== American operations ===
Muji entered the US market in 2002; its products were stocked at MOMA, New York.

Muji opened its first American store on November 16, 2007, in SoHo, Manhattan. In 2008, it opened two more stores in Manhattan: one in Times Square, and one in Chelsea.

On November 30, 2012, it opened its first store on the West Coast in South of Market, San Francisco. The San Francisco store, the Hollywood store, and the Santa Monica store are now permanently closed.

In New York City, Muji supplies products to a design store at the Museum of Modern Art and maintains a flagship store. As of July 2023, there were 7 stores in Manhattan, one in Boston, one in Portland, and another location in Williamsburg, Brooklyn. A small branch previously operated at JFK International Airport.

In July 2020, Muji USA filed for Chapter 11 bankruptcy, citing shutdowns from the COVID-19 pandemic.

== No-brand branding ==
Muji's no-brand strategy (generic brand) means that little money is spent on advertisement or classical marketing, and Muji's success is attributed to word of mouth, a simple shopping experience, and the anti-brand movement. Muji's no-brand strategy also means its products are attractive to customers who prefer unbranded products for aesthetic reasons, and because it provides an alternative to traditional branded products.

In terms of Muji's advertising of their products, Kenya Hara states that because customers perceived Muji in different ways, advertising would have to be used to present information rather than to communicate a message. These customer perceptions included liking Muji's ecological approach, appreciation for their urban aesthetics, a perception of low cost, and a perception of sophisticated design.

Muji has released a T-shirt with a rubber square on the chest for customers to design their own logo or message. Muji now sells paper products (such as notebooks) which can be personalized by customers using rubber stamps in-store at no charge. They also sell soft goods (such as T-shirts and hats) which can be computer embroidered to customer specifications, and picked up a few hours or days later.

== Design ==
Muji is known for its distinctive design, which is extended throughout its more than 7,000 products. Commentators have described Muji's design style as having mundanity, being "no-frills", being "minimalist", and "Bauhaus-style".

Muji product design, and brand identity, is based around the selection of materials, streamlined manufacturing processes, and minimal packaging. Muji products have a limited colour range and are displayed on shelves with minimal packaging, displaying only functional product information and a price tag. Detailed instructions included with the product are usually printed only in Japanese, although multilingual translations are starting to be included with some products.

=== Design approach and production ===
On its corporate website, Ryohin Keikaku Ltd rationalises its principles in terms of producing high quality products at "lower than usual" retail prices, true to the original Muji marketing slogan "lower priced for a reason". On its catalogue website Muji states that "at the heart of Muji design is the Japanese concept of Kanketsu, the concept of simplicity", aiming to "bring a quiet sense of calm into strenuous everyday lives". In an interview, Hiroyoshi Azami, President of Muji USA, described Muji's design culture as centred around designing "simple" products that are basic and necessary.

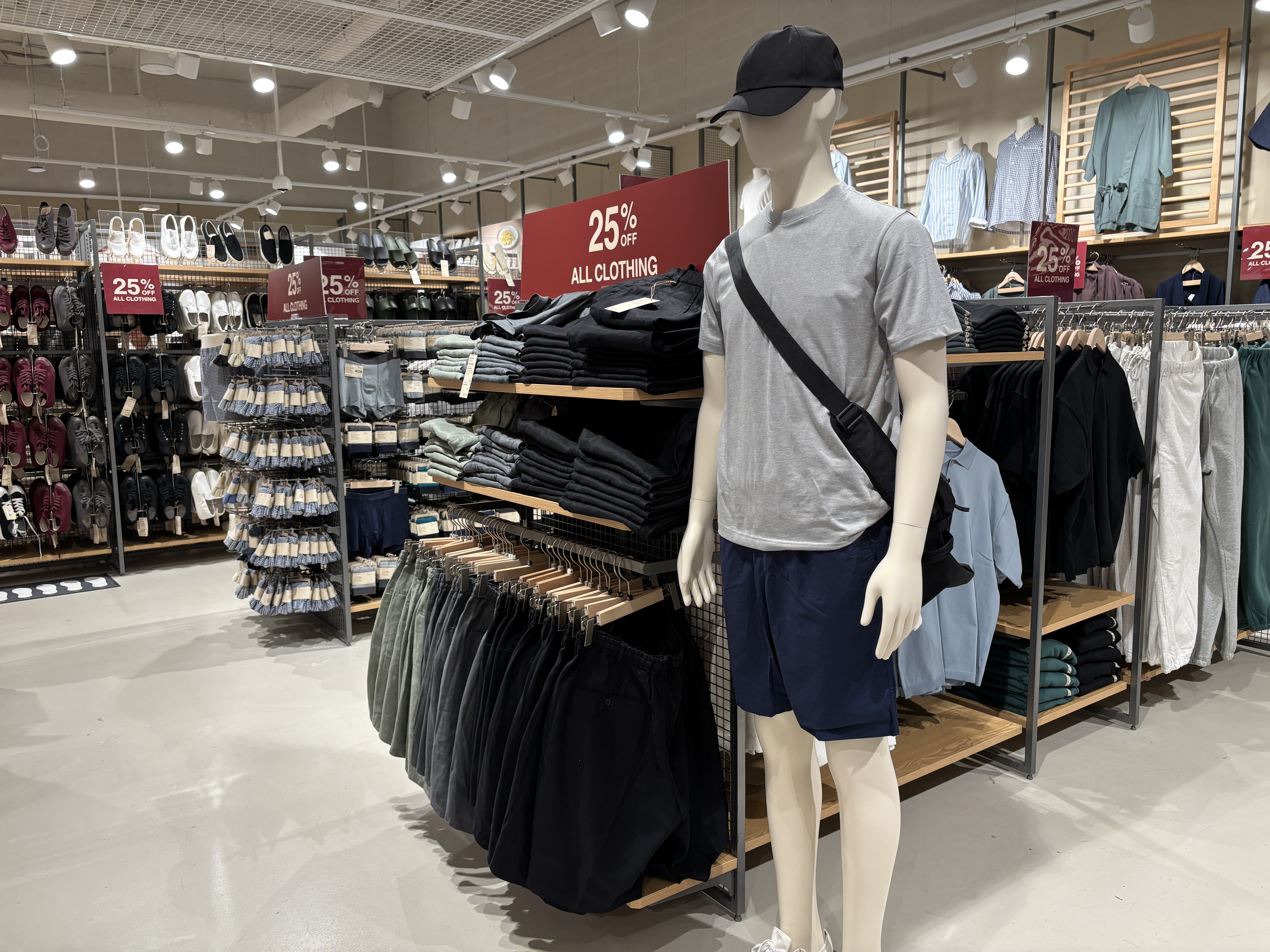
Men's clothes in a Muji store in Sydney

In its design, Muji also follows environmental guidelines, seeking to "restrict the use of substances that may have a significant impact on people or the environment" and "reduce waste by standardising modules, facilitating disassembly, and by reducing packaging".

The Muji design process resists technology for its own sake, and prototype designs are produced on paper rather than computers, so as not to encourage unnecessary detail. The manufacturing process is determined by the consumer's use of the product, which is a design priority. Finishes, lines, and forms are minimised for manufacturing ease.

In recent years, Muji has looked towards appreciating local culture and craftsmanship. The Found Muji line of products is a movement where Muji's designers find products and designs that follow the company's design approach, focusing on crafts and items that are used globally.

=== Designers ===
Muji products are not attributed to individual designers. While Muji has stated that some of its products have been the works of famous international designers, it does not disclose who they are. There are, however, some designers who made their involvement public. The most notable are Naoto Fukasawa, Jasper Morrison, James Irvine, Sam Hecht, and Konstantin Grčić.

Muji participates in design collaborations with other companies. In 2001, Muji and Nissan Motors produced the Muji Car 1000. This fuel efficient, low-emission, and low-cost limited edition vehicle aimed to incorporate recycled materials wherever possible. Following Muji's no-brand strategy, the car had no branding logos.

=== Manufacturers ===
Generally, Muji keeps its manufacturing sources private.

One notable exception is the brand's collaboration with Thonet, the oldest German furniture maker. In 2008, Muji and Thonet announced their cooperation to produce two lines of minimalist furniture. The first was bentwood chairs designed by James Irvine in homage to the iconic No. 14 chair of Thonet. The second was steel tubular chairs and desks designed by Konstantin Grčić. Roland Ohnacker, managing director of Thonet, stated that the aim was "to help 18 to 35 year-olds enter the Thonet brand world". From Spring 2009, these items of furniture are available at selected Muji stores.

=== Directors ===
The first art director of Muji was Ikko Tanaka. Tanaka is credited with developing the Muji concept together with Kazuko Koike (marketing consultant), and Takashi Sugimoto (interior designer). Tanaka articulated the Muji vision and appearance, and he provided ideas and prototypes that visualized the design strategy. Tanaka's design strategy included brown paper and clear cellophane packaging. In 2001, Kenya Hara, an internationally recognized graphic designer and curator, took over as art director. He stated that:

I found that the company was at a standstill with the original idea, 'No design', which was advocated at its inception. They also had more than 250 outlets and sold more than 5,000 items, including products that deviated from the initial Muji concept or were low cost, but of substandard quality.

Kenya Hara has been credited as key figure in further developing Muji. Hara has a background in graphic design, hence had experience in designing packaging and corporate identities. Beyond that, he is credited with significantly moulding the Muji brand and design identity. In an interview in 2005, Hara stated that "Everything in the world has become an object of interest for me. Everything is designed." Hara has published books on design philosophy, most recently Designing Design.

Sam Hecht, Creative Director of Muji Europe, is quoted as saying "The human is not the centre of everything, but on the same level of everything".

=== Design awards and competition ===
In 2005, Muji was awarded five gold product design awards by the International Forum Design in Germany.

In 2006, Muji held its first international design competition, "Muji Award 01". In 2007, Chen Jiaojiao published a book on Muji design and brand entitled "Brands A-Z: Muji".

== Following ==
The Berlin correspondent for The New York Times reports that the Japanese call Muji-fans "Mujirers". Muji's international stores and The Muji Catalogue mainly retail Muji home consumer goods, furniture and clothing, while Muji Japan sells in a wide range of sectors, including food, bicycles, camp sites, phones, yoga, florists, cafes, and concept houses.
