= Kenya Hara =

Japanese graphic designer

- 原 研哉 (Hara Ken'ya)
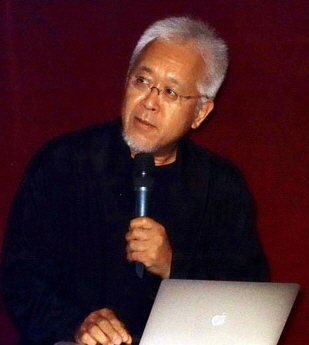
- Hara in 2015
- Born: Okayama Prefecture, Japan
- Education: Master's Degree Program (Design Course) of Musashino Art University
- Known for: Communication Design; Identification Design
- Website: ndc.co.jp/hara/

Kenya Hara (Japanese: 原 研哉, Hepburn: Hara Ken'ya; born 1958) is a Japanese graphic designer, curator and writer from Okayama prefecture, Japan. He is a graduate of the Musashino Art University. Hara joined Nippon Design Center after graduating from master's program at Musashino Art University in 1983. He is employed by the Musashino Art University as a professor and taught Communication Design and Design Theory in Science on the Design Faculty since April 2003.

Hara is one of the leading designers in Japan and his books Designing Design and White are recognized as important in the fields of design theory and aesthetics.

Hara has been the art director of Muji since 2001 and designed the opening and closing ceremony programs of the 1998 Winter Olympics.

In 2008, Hara partnered with fashion label Kenzo for the launch of its men's fragrance Kenzo Power. He designed the official posters for EXPO 2005 Aichi, created the signage system for the Umeda Hospital, the visual identification for the Nagasaki Prefectural Art Museum, worked on a new design for the Matsuya department store in Ginza, and participated in other design projects.

In 2021, Hara partnered with Xiaomi, designing a new logo for the company, which was unveiled on 31 March 2021. Hara and his company converted the previous square logo into a combination of a square and a circle. He earned $300,000 from the project.

== Exhibitions ==
In 2000, he organized the exhibition Re-Design: The Daily Products of the 21st Century. This exhibition was first held at Takeo Paper Show in Tokyo, then spread to the U.K. (Glasgow), Denmark (Copenhagen), Hong Kong, Canada (Toronto), and China (Shanghai, Shenzhen, Beijing). According to Hara, the exhibition is "a means by which to correct and renew our feelings about the essence of design, hidden within the fascinating environment of an object that is so overly familiar to us that we can no longer see it."

He invited 32 leading Japanese creators from various fields such as architecture, graphic design, lighting, fashion, and photography. He told them to redesign tedious goods. Each participant was in charge of one subject to re-design. Shigeru Ban re-designed toilet paper, Masahiko Sato re-designed exit/entry stamps for passports at international airports, Kengo Kuma re-designed the roach trap, Kaoru Mende re-designed matches, Kosuke Tsumura re-designed diapers, and Naoto Fukasawa re-designed tea bags.

In 2004, Hara planned and produced an exhibition named HAPTIC–Awakening the Senses, which focused on human sensory perception in design. For this exhibition, he invited various creators such as fashion designer Kosuke Tsumura, graphic designer Shin Sobue, product designers Jasper Morrison and Naoto Fukasawa, and architects Kengo Kuma and Toyo Ito. He told them to design "an object not based on form or color but motivated primarily by "haptic" considerations".

His other exhibitions include The Architects' Macaroni Exhibition (Tokyo), Tokyo Fiber – Senseware held in Paris, Milan and Tokyo, Japan Car (Paris and London), and Architecture for Dogs (Long Beach, Tokyo, SiChuan, Kanazawa, Shanghai, Kanazawa, Sao Paulo, and London.

== Works ==
- 1998 – Umeda Hospital - VI System, Applications
- 2000 – Hakkin – Sake Bottle
- 2000 – Matsuya Ginza – VI System, Advertising
- 2003 – MUJI – Poster, "Horizon"
- 2011 – Tsutaya Shoten (Bookstore) – VI System, Sign System, Applications & Advertising
- 2011 – Zhi Art Museum – VI System
- 2014 – PIERRE HERMÉ PARIS – Product Design
- 2017 – Graphic, "NOH"
- 2018 – Poster, "Natsure, Naturally, MUJI."

== Books ==
=== The Riddle of the Macaroni Hole, 2001 ===
Asahi Shimbunsha compiled a series of columns that Hara had written for the Nihon Keizai Shimbun [Japan Economic Newspaper] from 2000 to 2001.

=== Designing Design, 2007 ===
In Designing Design, Hara explains his theories and philosophical approach to design. Hara writes about the essence of design: "There are an unlimited number of ways of thinking and perceiving. In my understanding, to design is to intentionally apply to ordinary objects, phenomena and communication the essence of these innumerable ways of thinking and perceiving". "Producing something new from scratch is creative, but making known unknown is also an act of creation. Maybe the latter is more useful in nailing down just what design is". In this book, Hara also mentioned about his study "Information Architecture". Hara explained that the formation of impression is through the external stimulation of the senses and to recall the past memory in the brain. The past memory is constantly combined with the external information to build the "Information Architecture" (form a new memory). By changing the external stimuli, designers can meet the effect of certain information transmission.

=== White, 2010 ===
He also authored another book, White, which explores white as a design concept. He points out that "white is a color from which color has escaped, but its diversity is boundless." In this book, Kenya Hara elaborates on the importance of "emptiness" in both the visual and philosophical traditions of Japan and its application to design. Hara writes: "In some cases, white denotes "emptiness." White as noncolor transforms into a symbol of nonbeing. Yet emptiness doesn't mean "nothingness" or "energy-less"; rather, in many cases, it indicates a condition, or kizen, which will likely be filled with content in the future. On the basis of this assumption, the application of white is able to create a forceful energy for communication."

=== Ex-formation, 2017 ===
The book introduces a communication design method that is based on the new concept of determining how to make people aware of what they do not know.

=== Designing Japan: a future built on aesthetics, 2018 ===
In 2018, the English edition of Nihon no dezain: Biishiki ga tsukuru mirai was released as Designing Japan: A Future Built on Aesthetics. In this work, Hara explains his vision of how his industry can support Japan in crafting a future founded on a unique philosophy of beauty as well as crowd-sourced wisdom from around the world. The book is important for understanding Japanese aesthetics, while maintaining a practical approach to Japan's circumstances and future possibilities.

=== 100 Whites, 2019 ===
100 Whites is the extension of his previously published book 'White'. In this book, Hara gives 100 specific examples of white to explain the importance in design. On the basis of these examples, he discusses the importance of white in design – not only as a color but as a philosophy. Hara describes how he experiments with the different whites he mentions, what they mean in the process of his work, and how they influence design today.

== Awards ==
Kenya Hara is the recipient of numerous awards including the Grand Prize for the Signage Design Award Japan for his Signage System in Umeda Hospital, the Prime Minister's Award: Japan Calendar Exhibition he gained in 1999 for his EXPO 2005 Calendar, the Mainichi Design Award 2000, which he gained in 2001, and the grand prize for the Tokyo Art Director's Club Award he gained in 2003 for his advertisement campaign "Horizon".
