= Sam Hecht =

British industrial designer (born 1969)

Sam Hecht RDI
- Born: 7 August 1969 (age 56); London, England
- Occupation: Industrial designer

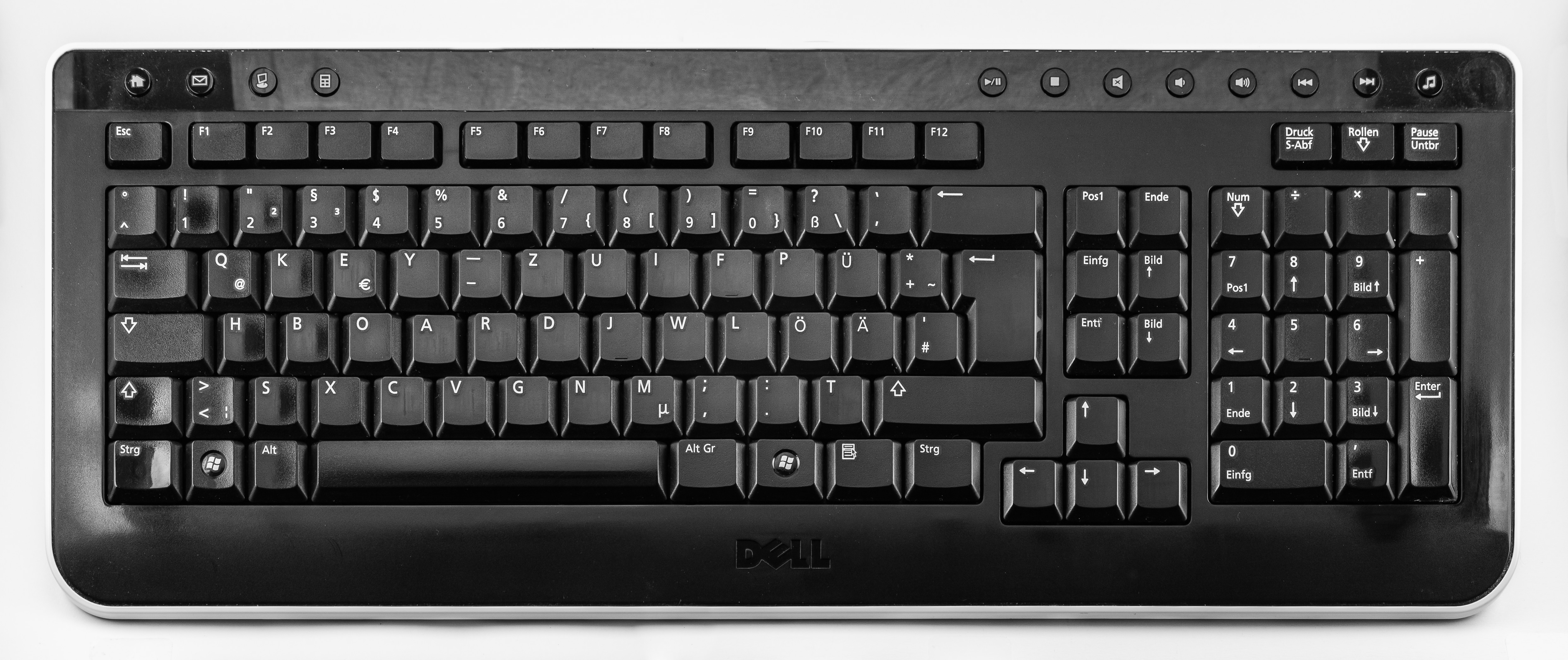
Dell keyboard SK-8165 with modified layout of the keycaps, designed by Industrial Facility

Sam Hecht RDI (born 7 August 1969) is a British industrial designer. Hecht and his partner Kim Colin are the founders of a London design studio called Industrial Facility. Clients include Muji, Yamaha, LaCie, Emeco, Established & Sons, Issey Miyake, Epson, Magis, Lexon, Dell, Whirlpool, and Wästberg.

He has taught at the Royal College of Art and as visiting professor of Karlsruhe University in Germany.

Hecht and Colin's work is held in museum collections including the Museum of Modern Art (MoMA) in New York and the Centre Pompidou in Paris.

Designs by Hecht and Colin have received numerous prizes including six iF Gold Awards.

Hecht and Colin were appointed Royal Designers for Industry in the United Kingdom in 2008 and 2015, respectively.

In 2019 Phaidon Press published a monograph about Industrial Facility’s work.
