= Emeco 1006 =

Navy chair

Emeco 1006 Navy Chair
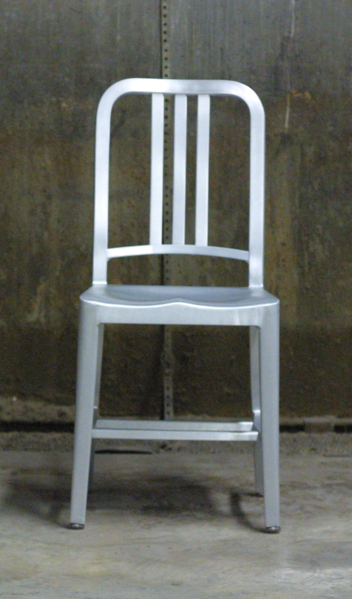
- An Emeco 1006 aluminium chair
- Inception: 1944
- Manufacturer: Emeco
- Available: Yes
- Website: Official website

The Emeco 1006 (pronounced ten-oh-six), also known as the Navy chair, is an aluminum chair manufactured by Emeco. The 1006 was originally built in 1944 for Navy warships during World War II, but later became a designer chair used in high-end restaurants and by interior designers. In the 1990s, the company began creating designer versions of the 1006 chair, such as the stackable Hudson chair and the 111 Navy Chair made from recycled plastic. Emeco also makes stools, tables, and other furniture. As of 2012, more than one million Emeco 1006 chairs have been produced.

== History ==
Emeco founder Wilton C. Dinges developed the Emeco 1006 chair in 1944 in collaboration with the Aluminum Company of America (ALCOA). It was originally designed for the US Navy, which needed a chair for the deck of battleships that could survive sea air and a torpedo blast to the side of the ship. The chairs had eye bolts under the seat, so they could be attached to a ship-deck using cables. When competing for the Navy contract, Dinges is reported to have demonstrated the chair's durability by throwing it out of an eighth floor window of a Chicago hotel where the Navy was examining submissions. It bounced, but did not bend or break.

A similar design called the No. 4295 chair which was part of the "GoodForm" line of products was produced by the General Fireproofing Company of Youngstown, Ohio in the 1930s.

After the war, Emeco started selling 1006 chairs to prisons, hospitals and government offices. The chair was sold to restaurants in the 1980s and 1990s, under Jay Buchbinder's leadership, then as a designer chair in the 2000s after Emeco was acquired by his son, Gregg. French designer Philippe Starck designed a total of 14 chairs and 4 tables for Emeco.

In 2006, Coca-Cola began a collaboration with Emeco to create a 1006-based chair made out of recycled Coca-Cola bottles, which was released as the 111 Navy Chair in 2010. Metropolis Magazine said it was a public relations effort by Coke to make a durable product out of their bottles; they also hoped to encourage other manufacturers to do the same.

In 2005, Target started selling an Emeco 1006 imitation product supplied by Euro Style. The supplier said it planned to modify the chair's style to avoid a legal dispute over alleged trademark infringement. In October 2012, Emeco filed a lawsuit against Restoration Hardware for allegedly making unauthorized reproductions of the 1006 Navy chair. Restoration Hardware removed the chair from its website, stopped selling the chair, and reached an undisclosed settlement with Emeco.

The Emeco 1006 chair is featured regularly in design magazines and movies, such as The Matrix, Law & Order and CSI. In Europe the original 1006 chair is sometimes referred to as "the prison chair" due to its use in government prisons and in prison-related movie scenes.

== Description ==
The original Emeco 1006 chair has a curved back with three vertical struts and a slight curve on the back legs. It weighs about seven pounds and is guaranteed to last 150 years. Most of the original chairs from the 1940s are still in use. The traditional aluminum chairs are made mostly out of recycled aluminum, but also silicon, iron, copper, magnesium, chromium, titanium and zinc. Emeco 111 chairs are made out of 60 percent recycled plastic and 30 percent glass fiber. The Emeco 111 chair was named based on it being made of at least 111 recycled Coca-Cola bottles.

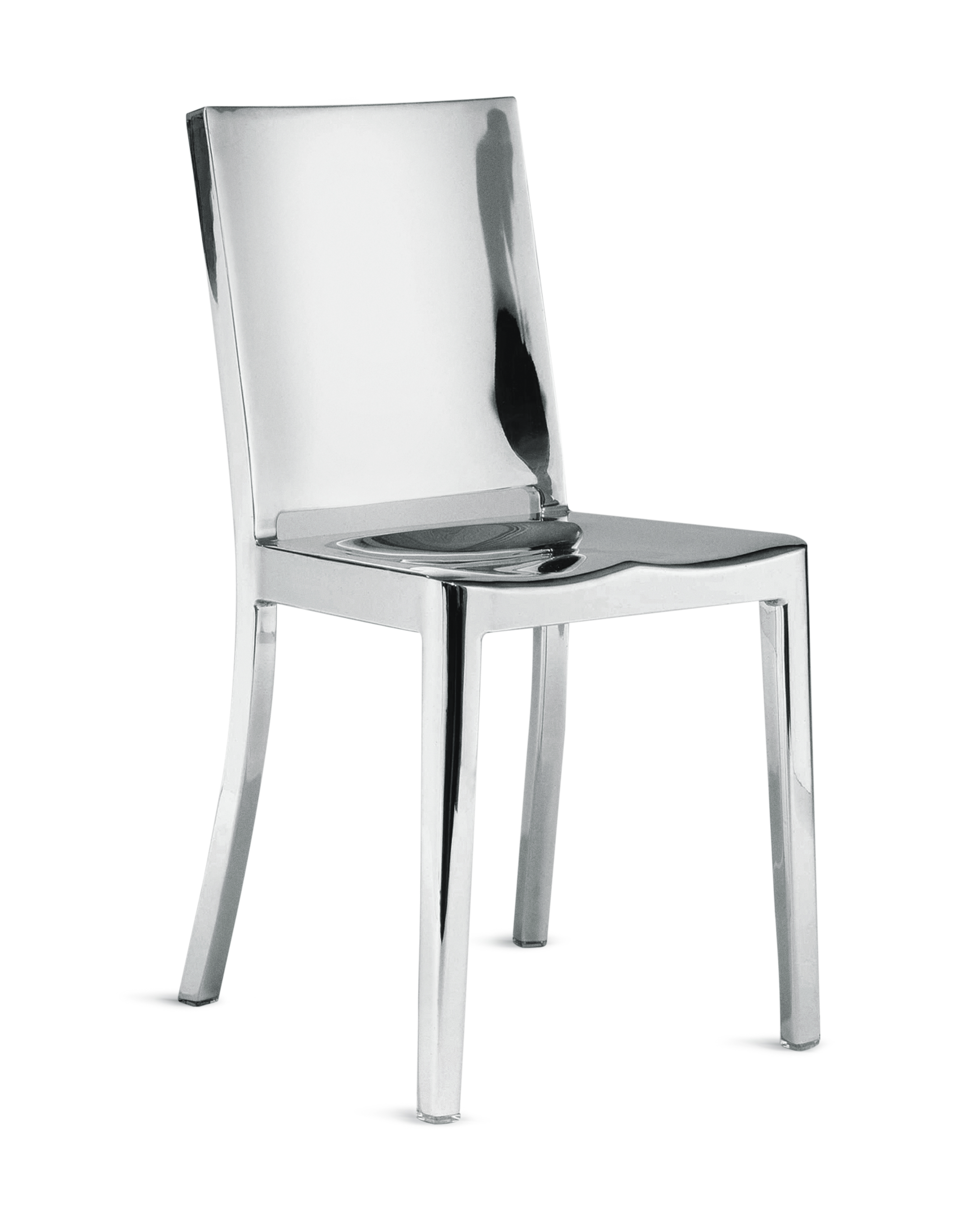
The Hudson chair

As of 2014, there are approximately 88 Emeco chair models. The first designer version of the 1006 chair in the "Emeco by Starck" line was the Hudson chair, named after the Hudson Hotel that put a Hudson chair in every room. It has a similar silhouette as the original 1006, but has a reflective or brushed aluminum surface, a solid backrest and is stackable. It also came in swivel and upholstered versions. The reflective glossy versions of the 1006 chair are polished for eight hours, substantially increasing their cost. There are also Emeco-brand barstools, swivel chairs, rocking chairs and armchairs.

Emeco's chairs are manufactured by hand in Hanover, Pennsylvania, through a two-week, 77-step process. Eames Demetrios, the grandson of designer Charles Eames, published a documentary film on the manufacturing process called "77 Steps." Many believe the chair is cast from a single form, but it is actually welded together from 12 pieces. Sheets of aluminum are rolled into tubes, cut to length, and bent into shapes on large hydraulic machines. Various notches and punchouts are made so pieces can fit together before welding. Workers grind down the welding joints to give it a smooth finish, creating the appearance of being cast from a single piece. The chair goes through a repeated heating and cooling cycle that increases the strength of the aluminum. The chairs are also anodized. Originally swivel chair bases and other parts were purchased from a supplier, but in the 1950s, Emeco began purchasing manufacturing equipment to manufacture them in-house.
