= 111 Navy Chair =

Recycled plastic chair

Emeco 111 Navy Chair
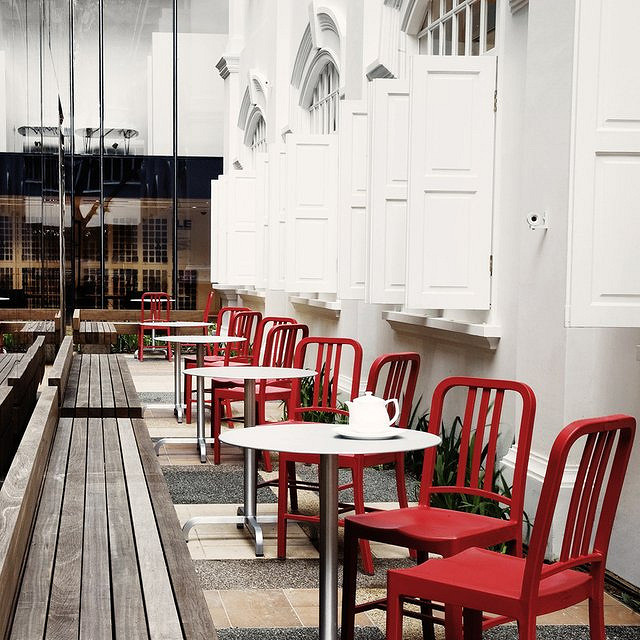
- A cafe using Emeco 111 Navy Chairs
- Type: Furniture
- Inception: 2010
- Manufacturer: Emeco
- Available: Yes
- Website: Official website

The Emeco 111 Navy Chair is a recycled plastic chair manufactured by Emeco. It is based on the Emeco 1006 chair originally built for Navy warships during World War II.

== History ==
In 2006, Coca-Cola sought a means to keep more of its plastic bottles out of landfills, and sought product applications via manufacturing partnerships. They approached chair manufacturer Emeco, best known for manufacturing chairs from aluminum. Emeco's leadership "jumped on the project." The company saw it as an opportunity to develop an innovative, structurally sound material and keep plastic bottles out of the landfill. The two companies began to talk about the possibilities of recreating the iconic Navy Chair using rPET.

== Development ==
At the time Emeco began working to create the chair out of rPET, other companies were making rPET products such as T-shirts, bags, caps and notebooks. Soft recycled PET plastic was initially intended for short-lived fabric and textiles and Emeco needed to build a tough, one-piece, scratch-resistant chair for heavy-duty use.

Emeco's engineering team spent four years developing a material made from recycled PET plastic, which is then formed into pellets. Those pellets are mixed with glass fiber and color pigment. Each chair starts as 6 kilograms (13 lb) of plastic pellets that are melted down and then injection-molded into the shape of the 1006 Navy Chair. Craftsmen add the H brace to make the chair sturdier, and they smooth out any imperfections that result from the injection molding process.

The resulting 111 Navy Chair has the identical design of the 1006 Navy Chair. The one-piece design is scratch-resistant and suitable for heavy-duty use.

Each 111 Navy Chair is made of at least 111 recycled PET plastic bottles—65% post consumer PET—with 35% glass fiber and pigment; this gives the chair its name. The chair comes in six colors and passes all commercial requirements—it is structurally strong, fire retardant and cleanable.

== Results ==
As of late 2016, over 22 million plastic bottles have been kept out of the landfill and made into 111 Navy Chairs. Emeco CEO Gregg Buchbinder said in an interview with Forbes magazine, "We've turned something many people throw away into something you want and can keep for a long, long time."

The chair is sold at a significantly lower price than the original aluminum version of the Navy Chair.
