= Naoki Takizawa =

Japanese fashion designer

Naoki Takizawa (Japanese: 滝沢直己; born 19 July 1960 in Tokyo, Japan) is a Japanese fashion designer. He has worked for notable fashion brands such as Issey Miyake, Uniqlo and Helmut Lang.

== Career ==
In 1983, Takizawa designed the Plantation collection at Issey Miyake fashion industry. In 1989, he joined the design team and in two years—1991, he became the company's design associate. From 1993, Takizawa began designing "Issey Miyake men" and in 1999 when he became the Chief Designer/Creative Director of Issey Miyake men's and women's.

In 2013, as part of Yanmar's centenary brand renewal project, Takizawa designed a famous marine and agricultural attire. From 2009 to 2013, he was a Project Professor at the Department of Intermediatheque within the University Museum at the University of Tokyo. In 2010, Takizawa became the creative director of Helmut Lang's "Mens line".

As the creative director of Uniqlo from 2011 to 2014, Takizawa created "LifeWear". He served in 2014, as the Design Director for Special Projects at Uniqlo, and represented in a collection collaboration with Inès de La Fressange. In 2015, he directed the design for the collaboration of Carine Roitfeld and Uniqlo.

In 2006, Takizawa founded his company Naoki Takizawa Design Inc., as a subsidiary of Issey Miyake. After collaborations, it started producing from 2008 to 2012 including the Train Suite Shiki-Shima uniforms.

== Awards ==
- In 1998, Takizawa was awarded the 16th Mainichi Design Prize.
- In 1999, he won the Bessie Award.
- In 2007, he was awarded the title of the Chevalier dans l'Ordre des Arts et des Lettres (Knight in the Order of Arts and Literature) at the Musée du Quai Branly – Jacques Chirac, Paris.
