= Mainichi Design Prize =

Japanese award for outstanding design

- Native name: 毎日デザイン賞
- Description: Japan's most prestigious annual award for outstanding designers
- Country: Japan
- Presented by: Mainichi Shimbun
- Website: https://macs.mainichi.co.jp/design/m/

The Mainichi Design Prize (毎日デザイン賞, Mainichi Dezain Shō), originally the New Japan Design Competition, is an annual award given to outstanding Japanese designers. The award, founded in 1952, is sponsored by Japanese newspaper Mainichi Shimbun. It is considered Japan's most prestigious award for design.

== Recipients ==
Listed below are some of the award winners:

- 1955: Kenji Ekuan, industrial designer
- 1962: Hozumi Akita, industrial designer
- 1964: Mitsuo Katsui, graphic designer
- 1966: Ikko Tanak
- 1972: Shiro Kuramata, furniture designer
- 1973: Ikko Tanaka, designer
- 1977: Issey Miyake, fashion designer
- 1985: Tishiyuki Kita, furniture designer
- 1986: Masayuki Kurokawa, interior designer, and Shigeo Fukuda, graphic designer
- 1987: Shigeru Uchida, interior architect, furniture and lighting designer
- 1990: Naoto Fukasawa, product designer
- 1991: Motomi Kawakami, furniture designer
- 1994: Mitsuo Katsui, graphic designer
- 1998:Naoki Takizawa
- 2002: John Maeda, digital graphic designer
- 2003: Kenya Hara, graphic designer
- 2016: Daito Manabe
- 2024: Shōhei Shigematsu
- 2025: Sou Fujimoto, architecture (Expo 2025 Grand Roof Ring)
