= Magis =

Latin word that means "more" or "greater"

Magis (pronounced "màh-gis") is a Latin word that means "more" or "greater". It is related to ad majorem Dei gloriam, a Latin phrase meaning "for the greater glory of God", the motto of the Society of Jesus. Magis refers to the philosophy of doing more for Christ, and therefore doing more for others. It is an expression of an aspiration and inspiration. It relates to forming the ideal society centered on Jesus Christ.

== From Ignatian retreat ==
Modern use of the word is often traced to St. Ignatius's Spiritual Exercises or retreat, where he would have the exercitant ask: "What have I done for Christ? What am I doing for Christ? and What ought I to do for Christ?" The more intimately the person comes to know Christ, according to St. Ignatius, the more the person will love him and the more closely the person will follow him. Throughout the Exercises, a grace the person asks for is to follow Christ more closely or to do what is more pleasing to God. This is frequently mentioned in the "points" for contemplating Christ's life which Ignatius proposes. Ignatius calls it the highest degree of humility for people to always want to be more like Christ in matters of poverty and worldly honors. Also, in what Ignatius calls the "First Principle and Foundation of the Christian life", he concludes with the admonition: "our one desire and choice should be what is more conducive to the end for which we are created". This concept of doing "more" occurs frequently throughout the Ignatian Exercises.

== Impact ==
Contemporary uses of magis often have Ignatian roots. Beginning in 1997 Jesuits have invited students to a "magis gathering", as before World Youth Day celebrations, to share the ideals which they learned in the Jesuit tradition. Additionally, the name "Magis" has been used for a Jesuit journal and newspaper and on banners heralding Jesuit education. The term is frequently central to the mission statement of Jesuit schools and can serve as a name for a voluntary service program or for an educational enhancement program for needy students. A video produced by Jesuits points out that the "more" is a matter of depth and quality, rather than of quantity.

== Usage in Jesuit higher education ==
The concept of magis as an ideal of life is emphasized in many of the Jesuit universities across the globe. One of the 10 service organizations on campus at Loyola Marymount University uses Magis as its name. The organization stands to allow students to be leaders and contribute in the greater Los Angeles Community in the areas of Homelessness and Education, citing their three pillars of Service, Diversity, and Spirituality on the strive for "The more" that is emphasized in the contemporary definition of the term.
