= Andrew Prokos =

American photographer

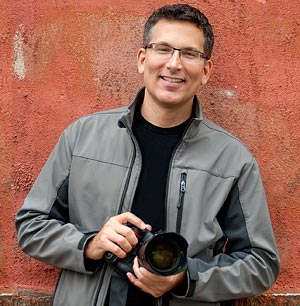
- Photographer Andrew Prokos
- Born: 1971 (age 54–55); Chicago, Illinois, U.S.
- Known for: Photography
- Awards: Lucies (IPA Awards), Prix de la Photographie Paris (Px3), American Photography, Epson International Pano Awards, Neutral Density Photography Awards
- Website: andrewprokos.com/bio.html

Andrew Prokos (born 1971) is an American architectural and fine-art photographer.

== Early life ==
Prokos was born to Greek parents who immigrated to the United States after World War II, settling in Chicago. At an early age Prokos's family moved to Florida, where he grew up and attended the University of Florida, where he graduated with a degree in Political Science. He first started taking photographs after moving to New York City at the age of 20.

== Work ==
During the mid-1990s Prokos spent two years living in Italy and Greece and traveling through Europe and Turkey. Prokos returned to New York City in 1996, and began working in interactive advertising. Prokos turned to photography full-time in 2002, and received commissions from a variety of clients, including architects, property developers, interior designers, ad agencies, and corporate clients. His photography has been published in numerous magazines, newspapers, and websites, including: ArchDaily, Casa Vogue, Communication Arts, DesignBoom Magazine, Dezeen Magazine, Manhattan Magazine, Metropolis, New York City Monthly, PDN Edu, and others. His photography has also been used in advertising campaigns for numerous companies such as Lloyds Bank, Morgan Stanley, E&J Gallo, Abbott Labs, Ritz-Carlton Hotel Company, and Evraz. Prokos is a member of the New York Chapter of the American Society of Media Photographers.

In 2012 and 2013 Prokos traveled to Brazil and produced several award-winning series of photographs, including Niemeyer's Brasilia. Niemeyer's Brasilia captured the surreal Modernist architecture of Brazilian architect Oscar Niemeyer in Brasília utilizing stark compositions and long exposure times. In July 2014 Prokos was one of 23 prominent Greek-Americans profiled in a documentary video series entitled Greeks Gone West, produced by the Embassy of the United States, Athens and Kathimerini newspaper. The video was shot on location at Prokos's exhibition at Banco do Brasil in New York.

In 2019 Prokos took part in a cultural delegation to the United Arab Emirates, which included prominent photographic artists and curators from the Guggenheim Museum in New York City and the A+D Museum in Los Angeles. He continued to document the landscapes and cityscapes of the Emirates of Dubai, Abu Dhabi, Sharjah and Al Ain in long-exposure photographs which spanned 4–10 minutes per exposure, as well as large-scale images derived from merging multiple 100 megapixel medium format images, a process known as 'stitching'. This formed the basis of his conceptual photography series Inverted UAE, which went on to win numerous awards and be published in the Middle East, the UK and Europe including DesignBoom, CNN, and Harper's Bazaar Art.

In 2020 Prokos produced series of experimental and abstract art. Metropolis Abstracted presents highly abstracted close-up details of contemporary architecture in New York City, Boston, and other major cities. Captured with a very high-definition medium-format camera, the photos went on to be included in Prokos's major solo exhibition Andrew Prokos: New Abstraction in the United Arab Emirates in 2022. In an interview with Widewalls Art Magazine, Prokos noted that "...when the image is reflected, an entirely new and inherent structure and visual language emerge. People often comment that the images seem to be revealing a hidden symbolism, and they interpret the images in all kinds of ways. So they do become a sort of Rorschach test for the viewer, which is not something that I can honestly claim to be by design but rather an interesting by-product of the process and its effect on the viewer. Metropolis Abstracted is a more psychological series in that sense.".

== Awards ==
Prokos has won numerous awards for his photography, most recently a jury selection at American Photography 37 (2021) for his series Metropolis Abstracted and a silver medal at the 2021 International Photography Awards in New York for his series Inverted. The same series were honored with honorable mentions at the 2020 and 2021 Prix de la Photographie, Paris (Px3).

Prokos' series "Night & Day", which utilizes multiple exposures captured over time to document the transition from day to night in various locations around the world, was selected for American Photography 31 and was awarded two first-place finishes at the 2015 Prix de la Photographie People's Choice Awards.

"Night & Day" was previously awarded a silver medal at the 2014 Neutral Density Photography Awards., and was awarded two Honorable Mentions at the 2014 International Photography Awards (Lucies).

Prokos's series of fine-art architectural photographs based on the works of architect Frank Gehry, entitled Gehry's Children, was awarded a silver medal at the 2014 Prix de la Photographie, Paris (Px3) for his and Honorable Mention at the 2014 International Photography Awards (Lucies).

Prokos's series of photographs of the Brazilian capital at night, entitled Niemeyer's Brasilia, was selected in 2014 by a panel of judges for the Latin American Fotografia 3 collection, and in 2013 was awarded a silver medal at the International Photography Awards (Lucie Awards). Prokos has been awarded with numerous medals in recent years at the Epson International Pano Awards for his panoramic photography of cityscapes and landscapes and has also won numerous Honorable Mentions for his photography from the International Photography Awards, the Prix de la Photographie, Paris, the International Color Awards, and the London International Creative Competition.

== Collections ==
Prokos's photographs have been included in several museum collections, including the Museum of the City of New York, 21_21 DesignSight Museum in Tokyo, and MART Museum of contemporary art in Rovereto, Italy. Corporate art collections displaying Prokos's work include: Diageo North America, Invesco, JP Morgan Chase, Ralph Lauren Corp, Northwestern Mutual, Merrill Lynch & Co, Capital One Bank, Cisco Systems, the Federal Reserve Bank of New York, Hyatt Hotels, Kimpton Hotels, Moody's Corporation, Oppenheimer & Co. Inc. and numerous others.

In 2018 Prokos's work was included in the U.S. State Department's Art in Embassies program, which places artwork by prominent American artists in embassies around the world. His work is also placed in the Consulate of Brazil in New York and in the Embassy of the United Arab Emirates in Washington DC.

== Exhibitions ==
In early 2022 Prokos was offered an extensive solo exhibition at the Xposure International Photography Festival in Sharjah, United Arab Emirates. Entitled Andrew Prokos: New Abstraction, the exhibition included large-scale abstract photography from his series Metropolis Abstracted and Inverted. The photographs encompass two separate galleries in order to show the photographs, which are five feet in scale each. In September 2022, the New Abstraction solo exhibition exhibited at GalleryX, an art gallery located on Al Majaz island in Sharjah.

A concurrent exhibition in early 2022, Andrew Prokos: Architecture, opened in February at Gallery Estella in New Orleans. Prokos's large-scale black and white photography of New York's famous landmark buildings were on display in 50 inch wide photographs.

In early 2019 Prokos opened his own photography gallery at 368 Broadway in New York's Tribeca neighborhood. The gallery showcased his large-scale photographs of cityscapes, landscapes, and architecture. Prokos closed the gallery in 2021 during the height of the COVID-19 pandemic in New York City.

In 2015-2016 Prokos's architectural photography relating to the work of architect Frank Gehry were exhibited in Architect Frank Gehry - I Have an Idea at 21 21 Design Sight museum in Tokyo, Japan.

In 2014, his photographs of Brazil were displayed in a solo exhibition at Banco do Brasil in New York entitled Brazil: Night & Day - Photographs by Andrew Prokos. The exhibition was held in conjunction with the Year of Brazil at Queens College, City University of New York. It was the first time that Banco do Brasil had exhibited works by a non-Brazilian artist in New York. Brazil: Night & Day - Photographs by Andrew Prokos was also exhibited at the Consulate General of Brazil in New York from May 5 - August 10, 2014 to coincide with the Brazil 2014 FIFA World Cup.

In both 2012 and 2013 Prokos's photographs were selected by a jury panel to be exhibited in the ASMP gallery at the American Institute of Architects national convention. Prokos's night photographs of Coney Island, Brooklyn were exhibited in 2006 at the Museum of the City of New York in an exhibition entitled Transformed by Light - The New York Night.
