= Dai Fujiwara =

Japanese fashion designer

- 藤原大
- Born: 1967 (age 58–59); Kanagawa Prefecture, Japan
- Education: Tama Art University; Central Academy of Fine Arts
- Occupations: Fashion designer, creative director, professor
- Years active: 1994–present
- Known for: Creative director of Issey Miyake; co-creator of A-POC
- Label(s): Issey Miyake (2006–2011); DAI&Co (2009–present)
- Awards: Good Design Grand Award (2000); Mainichi Design Award (2003)

Dai Fujiwara (藤原大 (Fujiwara Dai, born 1967)) is a Japanese fashion designer and creative director. He served as the creative director of Issey Miyake from 2006 to 2011. He is known for integrating mathematical and industrial engineering concepts into fashion design, most notably through the A-POC ("A Piece of Cloth") system co-created with Issey Miyake. His tenure at the brand was the subject of critical analysis for its use of geometry and scientific methodology in garment construction.

== Early life and education ==
Fujiwara was born in 1967 in Kanagawa Prefecture, Japan. He studied traditional Chinese painting at the Central Academy of Fine Arts in Beijing and later attended Tama Art University (Department of Design, textiles), graduating with a design degree.

== Career ==
=== Issey Miyake (1994–2011) ===
Fujiwara joined the Miyake Design Studio in 1994. In 1998, he began collaborating with founder Issey Miyake on the A-POC project. This system utilized computer-programmed industrial knitting machines to create continuous tubes of fabric that consumers could cut into garments without sewing, a process that earned the Good Design Grand Award in 2000.

In 2006, Fujiwara was appointed creative director of the Issey Miyake women's and men's Paris collections, succeeding Naoki Takizawa. Fashion critics noted a shift in the brand's direction under his leadership; Tokyo Weekender described Fujiwara as an "intellectual" designer whose "meticulous and calculating approach" differed from his predecessors, citing his focus on integrating A-POC technology directly into the main ready-to-wear lines.

His collections frequently referenced academic themes. In 2010, the American Mathematical Society highlighted his "New Geometry" collection, noting that he had consulted with mathematician William Thurston to develop garments based on the Poincaré conjecture. Fashion critic Suzy Menkes reviewed the collection for The New York Times under the title "Designers Outline a New Geometry", analyzing how the team used topology to transform flat 2D shapes into 3D garments. Industry publication The Cutting Class praised his "process as presentation" approach, observing that his decision to display paper patterns alongside finished garments revealed the "geometric base" and complex engineering usually hidden in fashion.

=== DAI&Co (2012–present) ===
After leaving Issey Miyake in 2011, Fujiwara founded his own firm, DAI&Co. He has since directed research-based exhibitions, such as "Color-hunting" (2013) at 21_21 Design Sight, where he led a team to capture colors from nature and wildlife for design applications. He serves as a professor at Tama Art University and a visiting professor at Kanazawa College of Art.

== Exhibitions ==
Fujiwara’s work is held in the permanent collections of major museums. The Museum of Modern Art (MoMA) in New York acquired examples of his A-POC textiles, which were featured in the exhibition Items: Is Fashion Modern? (2017–2018). The Metropolitan Museum of Art holds a 1999 A-POC ensemble in its Costume Institute collection.

In 2021, the Hong Kong Design Institute Gallery presented a retrospective titled Dai Fujiwara: The Road of My Cyber Physical Hands.

== Awards ==
2000: Good Design Grand Award (for A-POC)

2003: Mainichi Design Award

== Collections ==
Fujwara's work is included in the permeant collection of the Museum of Modern Art.
