= Harvey Lloyd =

American photographer (1926–2022)

- Born: November 26, 1926; New York City, U.S.
- Died: April 2022 (aged 95); Belgrade, Serbia
- Education: Cooper Union
- Known for: Photography
- Movement: Breaking the Light

Harvey Lloyd (November 26, 1926 – April 2022) was an American photographer and the leading figure in the "Breaking the Light" abstract expressionist photographic movement. He is well known for both his realistic and abstract photography. Lloyd trained under the legendary Alexey Brodovitch and his photography spans a range of realistic styles from advertising to aerial photography to nature photography, and social photography; as well as, more recently, abstract styles. Lloyd uses his abstract work to inform his realistic work. His work has been shown at the Museum of Modern Art in New York City, the Grand Palais in Paris, and the International Center of Photography.

== Early life ==
Lloyd was born in Brooklyn, New York City on November 26, 1926, to Jewish Ukrainian immigrants. He attended public schools in New York. Lloyd spent one year at Cooper Union in New York studying graphic art and art direction.

== Progression of styles ==
Lloyd began his career as a graphic designer for the old American Weekly Hearst Sunday Magazine in New York. In the 1950s he created his own companies Graphic Arts Center and APA and Lloyd Inc. where he practiced traditional graphic design. In the 1960s, he attended Brodovitch's Design Laboratory in New York for graphic designers. He made slide shows for projection in the workshop using images and sound in an aleatory manner to discover serendipitous and unexpected combinations of audio-visual experiences. He then attended Brodovitch's Design Laboratory Workshops for photography. He became involved in photojournalism using a realistic traditional style of photography.

His interest in photojournalism was accompanied by an interest in and practice of abstract photography. Initially, his approach was in the manner of traditional photographic abstraction—seeing patterns of peeling paint, tattered wall poster ads, patterns of every kind. Partly influenced by the blurred bullfighter images of his colleague Ernst Haas, Loyd's traditional still color and black-and-white photography transformed in 1995 with his first photography of the Halloween Eve parade up Sixth Avenue in Manhattan at dusk and night. He made blurred several-second exposures of the grotesquely masked witches, skeletons, etc., and fired his camera mounted flash during the long exposures. These images straddled between the real and the abstract blurred impressions. These post abstract expressionistic and post impressionist images "reinvented" the over two hundred year old "What you see is what you get" art of still film photography. He made tens of thousands of these images around Manhattan at night. "Breaking the Light" is the name for his post-abstract photographs. Each image is made during a single exposure in Lloyd's digital camera. The name "Breaking the Light" was coined in 2002 by Ivana Lovincic, photographer and current Director/Curator of Lloyd's Studio.

In 2010 Loyd moved to Santa Fe, New Mexico. From Santa Fe he traveled approximately 80,000 miles to photograph National Parks and Pueblo ruins. He used his classic still film realistic technique. However his work was influenced by Breaking the Light. In addition, concepts from quantum physics, metaphysics and Eastern philosophy influenced the realistic work.

== Death ==
Lloyd died in Belgrade, Serbia in April 2022, at the age of 95.

== Major shows ==
Lloyd's work has been shown at

- The Museum of Modern Art in New York City
- The Grand Palais Museum in Paris
- The International Center of Photography in New York
- The Museum of Northern Arizona
- The Venice Film Festival where he won the Mercurio d'Oro, and
- The Heard Museum in Phoenix with the installation of the multi-screen show Our Voices, Our Land
  - "Harvey, I literally had goose bumps when viewing your (new Southwest images DVD) which I became recipient of only moments ago. It was nearly 30 years ago that you created the single most compelling multi-media production of any public attraction at the time... To think this show ran in the orientation theater for a good 15 years and it is still being shown in the Heard daily within their permanent exhibit! A remarkable run because of a remarkable artist and his creation that I am confident has impacted millions of lives."—Mike Fox, former director Heard Museum

== Awards ==
- The Pacific Area Travel Association's gold medal for photography of China
- The Art Director's Club Gold and silver medals for the Royal Viking Line advertising campaign
- CINE Golden Eagle Award
- Mercurio d'Oro from the Venice Industrial Film Festival for Portrait of a Railroad
- Silver Anvil from the Public Relations Society of America for photography of volunteer older teachers
- Grand Award—Photo Essays from the German magazine Bilderzeit

== Professional positions ==
- Lloyd was a president of the American Society of Media Photographers
- One of Canon USA's distinguished Explorers of Light
- An exhibiting member of The National Arts Club in New York City

== Bibliography ==
=== Picture books ===
- Lloyd, Harvey (2004). THE SAMURAI WAY, Spiritual Journeys With A Warrior Photographer. New York: Ruder Finn Press.
- Maxtone-Grahame, John; Harvey Lloyd (2004). QUEEN MARY 2, The Greatest Ocean Liner of Our Time. New York: Bulfinch Press.
- Lloyd, Harvey (2010). THROUGH MY EYES, The Remarkable Children of Senegal. New York: Ruder Finn Press.
- Lloyd, Harvey. FIRE IN MY HAIR: Reinventing The Art of Photography In The Digital Age. Bloomington IN: X-Libris Press.
- Lloyd, Harvey. VOICES FROM THE FUTURE: Young People Speak About Their Lives, Art and Photography. Bloomington IN: X-Libris Press.

=== Trade books ===
- Lloyd, Harvey; Michael J. Fox (1995). Sacred Lands of the Southwest. New York: Monacelli Press.
- Lloyd, Harvey; Jay Clarke (1999). Voyages: The Romance of Cruising. London: DK Publishing.
- Lloyd, Harvey (1992). Isles of Eden: Life in the Southern Family Islands of the Bahamas. Benjamin Press.
- Lloyd, Harvey (1990). Aerial Photography: Professional Techniques and Commercial Applications. New York: Watson Guptill.

=== Limited edition books ===
Lloyd also has a number of limited-edition, print-on-demand books of his photography.

- BREAKING THE LIGHT: Post Abstract Expressionist Photographic Images.
- BACH'S MIND: A Walk To The Stars
- LAS VEGAS DECONSTRUCTED, images from one man exhibition in Las Vegas.
- THE TAO OF CRANES: Sandhill Cranes Bosque del Apache Wildlife Reserve.
- DEAD SEA MIRAGES: Hidden Rainbows.
- MOONLIGHT SONATAS: The Moon In Hyperspace.
- MOONLIGHT NOCTURNES: Homage To Whistler
- YELLOWSTONE: The Devil's Volcano.
- SENEGAL: The Remarkable Children of the Desert Nomads
- LOG RHYTHMS: Aspen Tree Trunk Carvings
- TOTEMS: Graffiti On The Road To The Summit
- MONUMENT VALLEY, aerial & ground level images.
- BACH: A Christmas Oratorio
- LAS VEGAS DECONSTRUCTED
- PARADISE LOST: Petrified Logs From The Emergence of Dinosaurs
- HOLOCAUST: Yad Vashem Memorial Museum in Israel.
- FOUR SEASONS OF HENRY MOORE (At NY Botanical Garden)
- CONDOR: MACHU PICCHU, "A Life of Stone After So Many Lives."
- ULTIMATE ROSES; The Beauty and Poetry of Macro Images of Roses.
- A TIME FOR WAR & A TIME FOR PEACE: Israel Soon After 1967 War
- THE QUANTUM GHOST: Reality & Unreality In the Art of Digital Photography.
- DANCING WITH GHOSTS: Point Lobos Nature Reserve.
- HALLOWEEN: NYC's GIGANTIC WITCHES & DEVILS PARADE.
- SPIRIT HOUSE: Lloyd's Studio - Spirit Figures From Around the World
- THE SERMON ON THE MOUNT: Illustrated With Cloudscapes
- THE QUANTUM EYE: Macro Holograms &The New Art of Digital Photography.
- SAKURA: Cherry Blossoms In A Japanese Garden with Poems from Kyoto.
- BRYCE CANYON: Nature's Barber Poles and Totems
