= Carel Balth =

Dutch artist and curator (1939–2019)

Carel Balth (Rotterdam, November 25, 1939 – Vreeland, July 10, 2019) was a Dutch artist and curator. He was self-taught and lived and worked in the Netherlands and Italy. Between 1987 and 1999 he worked regularly from his studio in White Street in New York. The main themes in his work are light, time, space and movement. Balth has made many different kinds of works in his career, but his hallmark is exploring the intersections between abstract photography, painting and new media.

- 60s/70s: Light Objects

In the late 1960s, he began with the abstract Light Objects, made of crystal-clear plexiglass, sometimes combined with metal bands. By cutting the material and then projecting artificial light onto the object, he creates special light and shadow lines and shapes on the wall, creating a new composition. He had several exhibitions at the avant-garde Galerie Swart in Amsterdam. Mondriaan and Lucio Fontana are important for the development of his work. The straight line, which divides and connects at the same time, is an element that recurs throughout Balth's oeuvre.

- 70s/80s: Abstract Photography

Balth uses various techniques to delve into the interplay of light and time. In the 70s and 80s, photography played a major role in this. He is one of the pioneers of abstract photography.

By photographing the same architectural form by day and night in his Light Photo Works, he connects daylight with artificial light, reality with abstraction. In The New Collage he captures the light on beautiful foil, stuck to a corner of an exterior wall. Later, he incorporates the same foil into the print of the photo. In doing so, he creates a special interplay between the three-dimensionality of the photographed subject and the final collage on the flat surface. The photo becomes an object. In his Polaroid Paintings, Balth edits the Polaroid photos with his nails during the development process, leaving his signature on an image that does not yet exist at that time.

- The 90s: New techniques

In his Laser Paintings, Balth experiments with new light: laser. He uses this technique to 'paint' on canvas, a medium with which he once started his career as a painter in 1967. In his series of laser paintings 'The Touch', Balth uses the brushstrokes of the French Impressionist Monet, which he magnifies 2500 times. An ode to the French master who, like Balth, but some 100 years earlier, was always looking for light and the effect of light in his work. In 1997, Balth brought his research into light and reflection to The Vinyls, large pieces of canvas hanging off the wall with poetic semi-abstract images on them.

- 2001-2019: Videowatercolors

Since 2001, Balth has been using two or more moments from a digital video in the Videowatercolors, which he freezes in time, as it were. By combining these different 'video grabs' in 1 print, a new, often painterly image is created, which connects space and time. Always separated by a horizontal or vertical line, Balth combines two different moments from time, which he brings together in 1 image. The images from the videos Balth chooses often have the fluid effect of watercolour on paper. Hence the term 'videowatercolors'. Light, movement and the passage of time are important elements in this series.

== Museums ==
His work can be found in, among others, the following museums:

- Stedelijk Museum, Amsterdam
- Kunstmuseum Den Haag, The Hague
- Museum of Modern Art, New York
- Centre Georges Pompidou, Paris
- Louisiana Museum of Modern Art, Humlebæk, Denmark
- National Gallery of Art, Washington
- Stedelijk Museum de Lakenhal, Leiden
- Kröller-Müller Museum, Otterlo
- Henry Art Gallery, Seattle
- Groninger Museum, Groningen
- Stedelijk Museum Schiedam, Schiedam
- Museum Voorlinden, Wassenaar
- Princeton University Art Museum, Washington
- Fleming Museum of Art, Vermont
- Städtiches Museum Abteiberg, Monchengladbach
- Museo Fondazione Antonio & Carmela Calderara, Milan
- Musée d'Art Moderne et Contemporain, Saint-Étienne

== Television programs ==
- Exhibition of Carel Balth in Museum EICAS on Dutch National Television "Nu te Zien!" on 28 oktober 2024
- Exhibition interview of Carel Balth in Galerie Swart, Amsterdam on Dutch National Television "NOS Scala" on 29 augustus 1969

== Gallery ==
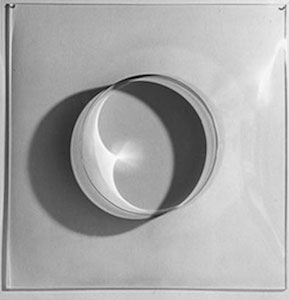
Light Object 1969

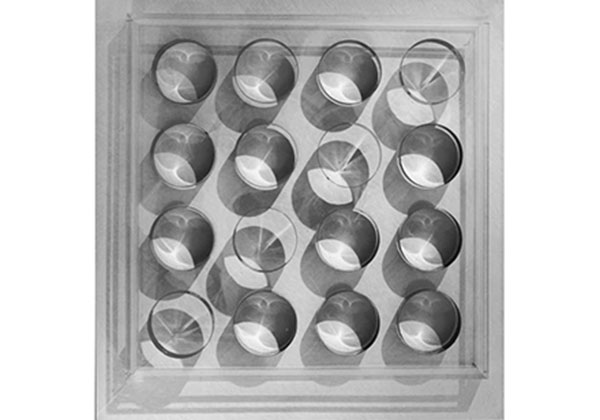
Light object 16 rings 1969

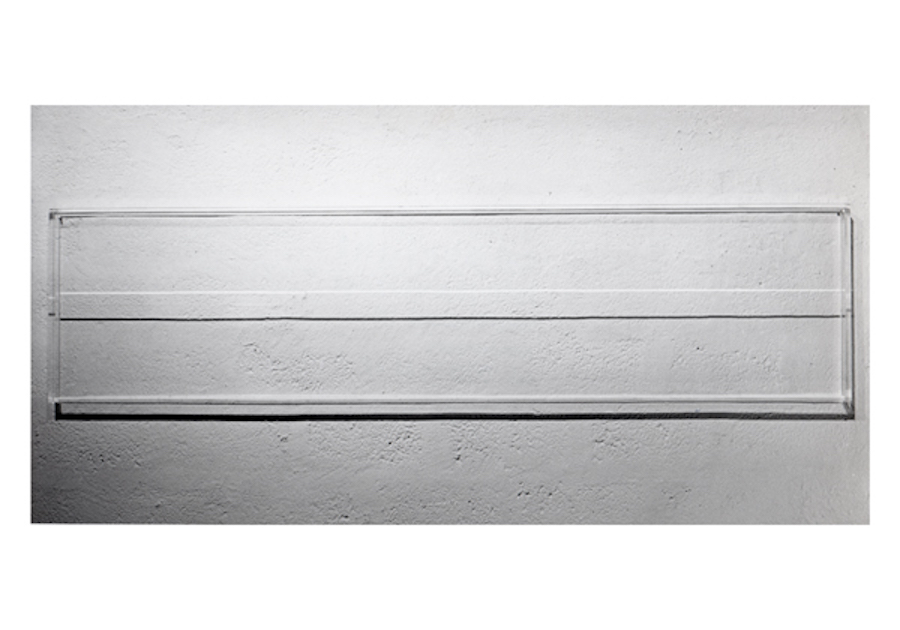
Light object continuous lightline 1973

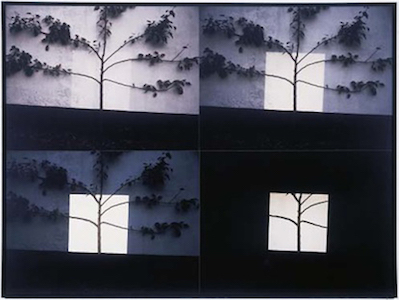
Light Photo Works Transitions Tree I 1976

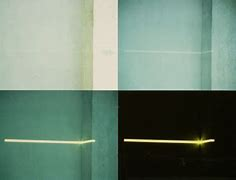
Light Photo Works Transitions Line I 1977

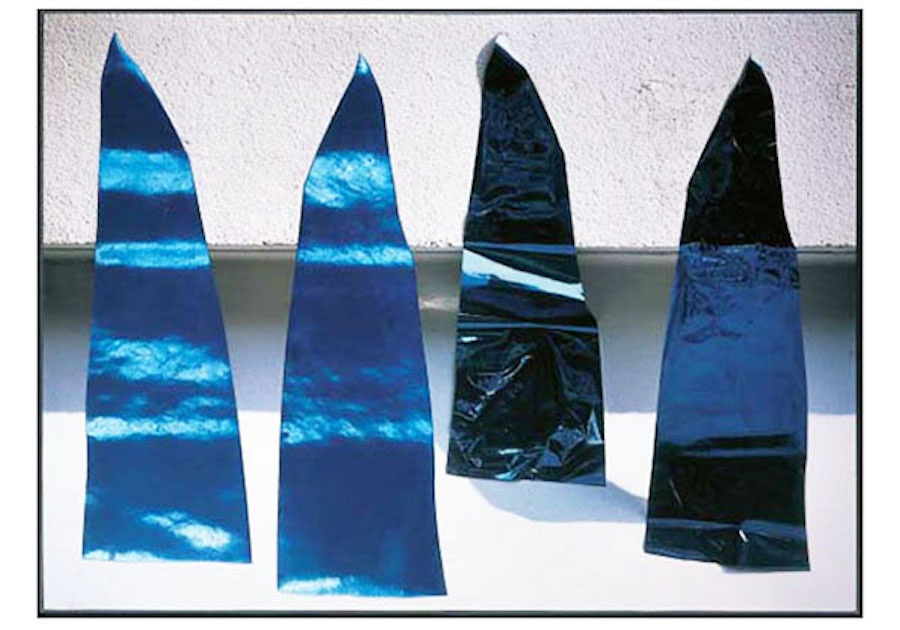
The New Collage 2 1980

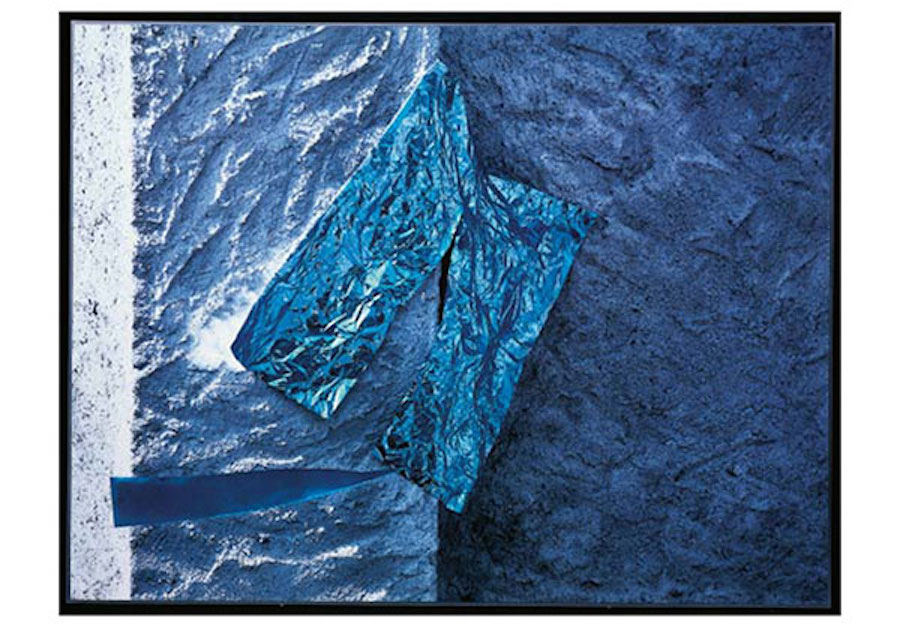
The New Collage 4 1980

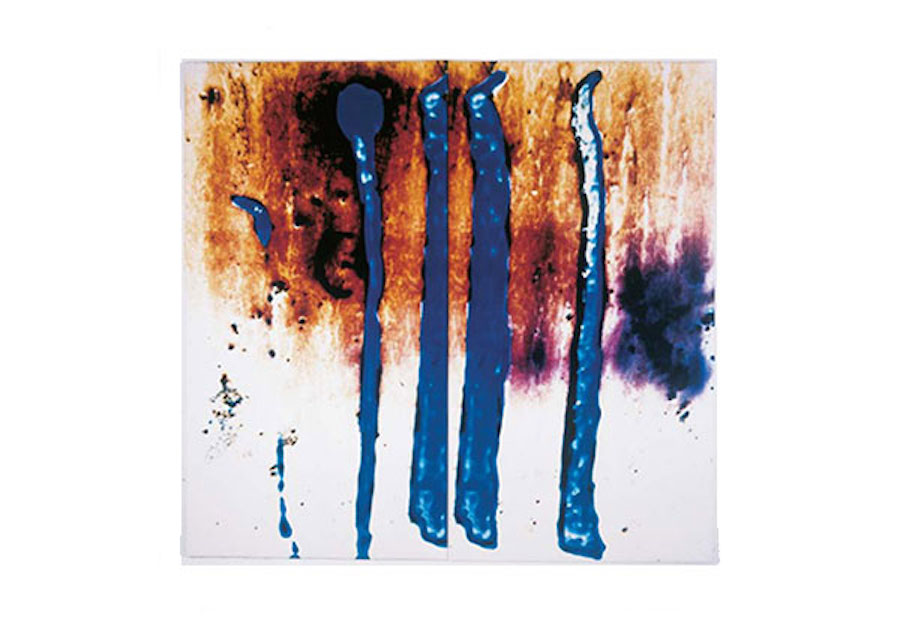
Polaroid Painting About the Reality of Peace 1986

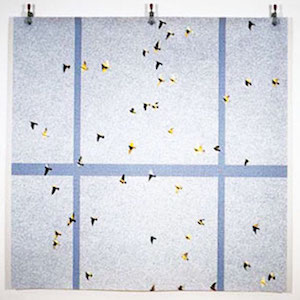
The Vinyls Sky lines II 1999

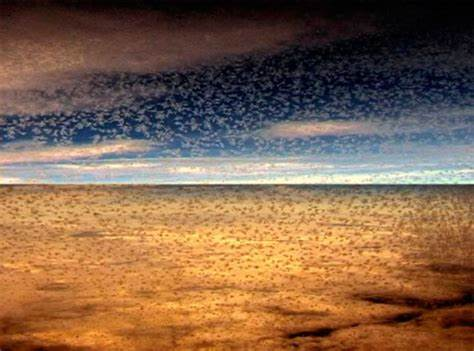
Videowatercolor Skyscape 2003

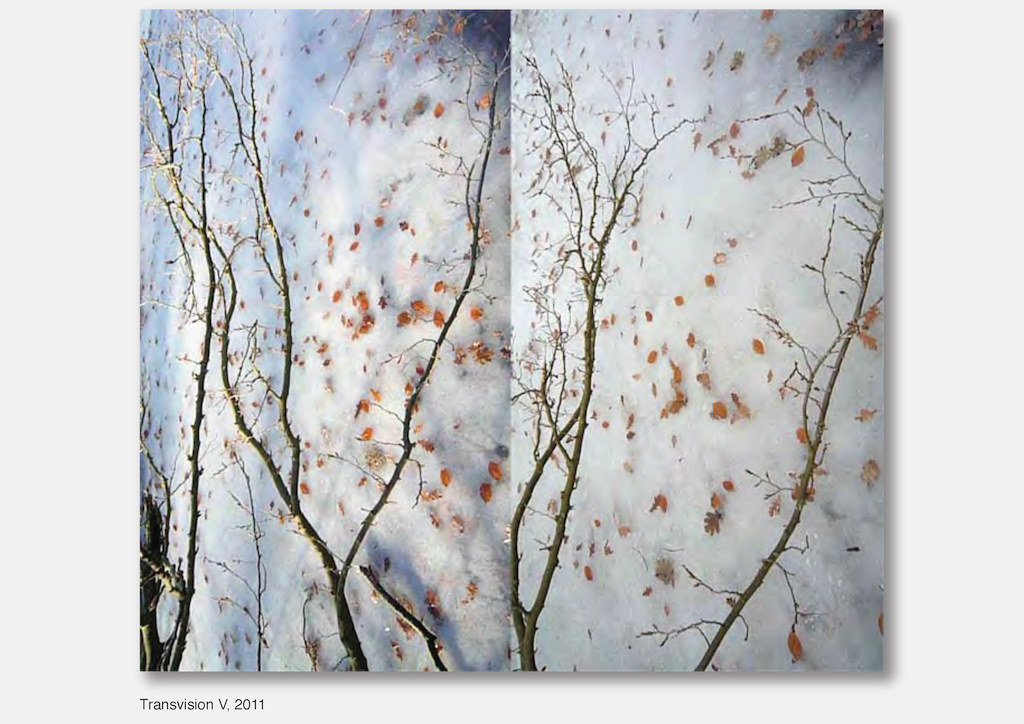
Videowatercolor Transvision V 2011

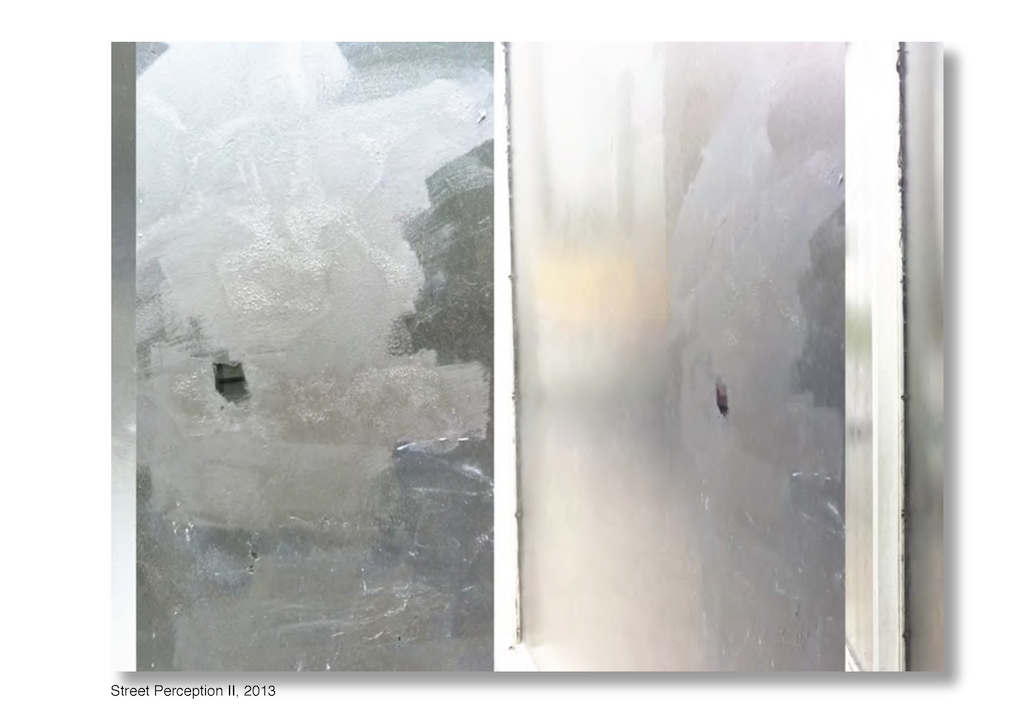
Videowatercolor Street Perception II 2013

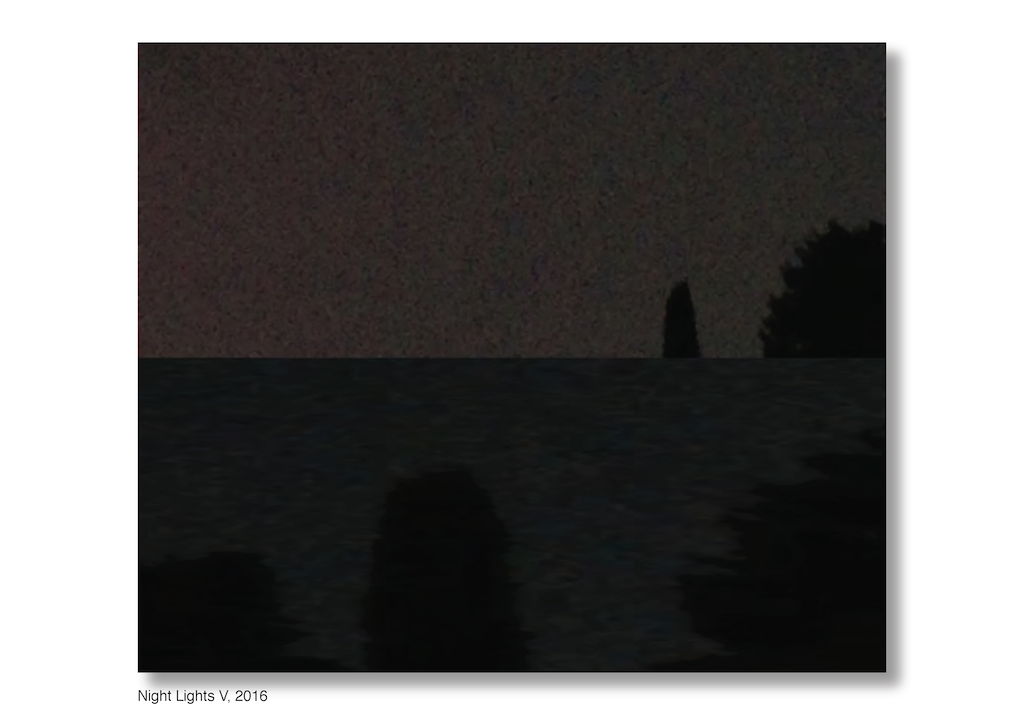
Videowatercolor Night Lights V 2016

== Selected exhibitions ==
- 2024-2025 Museum EICAS in Deventer: 03 The Poetry of Light
- 2024 Gallery Borzo on PAN Amsterdam
- 2022 Double Je (collection Durand-Dessert) Musée d'art Moderne et Contemporain in Saint-Étienne
- 2020 Kjubh Kunstverein in Cologne: Beauty in Restraint
- 2017 Parts Project 06 in The Hague
- 2013 Louisiana Art & Science Museum in Baton Rouge: The Edge of Vision
- 2012 Schneider Museum of Art in Ashland: The Edge of Vision
- 2011 The Henry Art Gallery in Seattle
- 2010 Center for Creative Photography in Tucson: The Edge of Vision Abstract photography
- 2009 Aperture Foundation in New York: The Edge of Vision
- 2009 China Pingyao Photography Festival in Pingyao
- 2002 Kunstraum Innsbruck
- 2001 Kunstmuseum The Hague: The Beauty of Intimacy
- 2001 Staatliche Kunsthalle Baden Baden: The Beauty of Intimacy
- 2000 Kunstmuseum The Hague
- 1992 Elga Wimmer Gallery New York
- 1989 Danforth Museum in Boston: Vision and Revision, recent art from the Netherlands
- 1988 Städtisches Museum Abteiberg in Monchengladbach: Collectie Etzold
- 1988 Kunsthalle Dusseldorf: Similia/Dissimilia
- 1987 Columbia University New York, Leo Castelli Gallery: Similia/Dissimilia
- 1987 Vereniging van het S.M.A.K in Ghent
- 1986 Folkwang Museum in Essen
- 1985 Groninger Museum
- 1983 Museum hedendaagse Kunst Utrecht
- 1981 Mercato del Sale in Milan
- 1978 Gallery Banco / Massimo Minini in Brescia
- 1978 Palais des Beaux Arts in Brussels: Les Livres d'artistes
- 1977 Van Abbemuseum in Eindhoven
- 1977 Galerie Durand-Dessert in Paris
- 1977 Musee d'Art et d'Industrie in St Etienne
- 1975 Galerie Swart in Amsterdam
- 1974 Folkwang Museum in Essen
- 1974 Stedelijk Museum in Amsterdam
- 1972 Galerie Swart in Amsterdam
- 1972 La Polena in Genova
- 1972 Galerie Keller in Munich
- 1969 Galerie Swart in Amsterdam
- 1969 Stedelijk Museum Schiedam

== Groups of works ==
- Light Objects 1969–1975
- Light Photo Works 1975–1978
- The New Collages 1979–1982
- Polaroid Paintings 1982–1986
- Laser Paintings 1986–1995
- Natsune Paper Works 1995–2000
- The Vinyls 1997–1999
- Videowatercolors 2000–2019

== Media ==
- Rexer, Lyle (2013). The Edge of Vision: The Rise of Abstraction in Photography. New York: Aperture Foundation. ISBN 978-1597112420.
- Upchurch, Michael 'Videowatercolors' play with time and space The Seattle Times 2011
- Brian Miller, The Henry's Two Big Fall Shows. Brain art vs. body art The Seattle Weekly 2011
- Heingartner, Douglas Videowatercolors: the Perception of Meaning 2007
- Brehm, Margrit Die Verwandlung von Potenzialität in Realität. Einige Gedanken zu den Videowatercolors von Carel Balth Heart Beat 2005
- Jansen, Gregor Die Errettung der äußeren Wirklichkeit. Medientheoretische Überlegungen zu den Videowatercolor Heart Beat 2005
- Mac Giolla Léith, Caoimhín Carel Balth's The New Collages and the psychodynamics of vision Heart Beat 2005
- Wieczorek, Marek From Magneple to Videowatercolors: The Heart Beat in Balth's Oeuvre Heart Beat 2005
- Van Hasselt, Kai / van Zeil, Wieteke “Dit is mijn meta-kunstwerk” Volkskrant 2005
- Bronwasser, Sacha Dicht op de huid van de kunstenaar Volkskrant 2001
- Piller, Micky Intensiteit en bravoure Het Financieële Dagblad 2001
- Put, Roos van Intimiteit van de gedachte Haagsche Courant 2001
- Smallenburg, Sandra De charme van ontluikende seksualiteit NRC Handelsblad 2001
- Stiemer, Flora De jaren negentig: vrijheid en betrokkenheid Algemeen Dagblad 2001
- Velde, Paola van de Intimiteit van de jaren negentig De Telegraaf 2001
- Wieczorek, Marek Sky Lines: recent work of Carel Balth 2001
- Roos, Renate Vogelflug im Bild Kölner Stadt-Anzeiger 1999
- Wieczorek, Marek Reflections: The World Writ Large with Carel Balth 1997
- Ooms, Toine The Interactive Exhibition; Tools and Tales, CD-Rom Catalogue Artis, ‘s-Hertogenbosch 1994
- Wieczorek, Marek The Touch of Light: Laser Paintings by Carel Balth 1993
- Ostrow, Saul "Shifting Ground, Unstable Territories" Sytsema Galleries, Baarn 1992
- Van Mulders, Wim "Permutations of Unveiled Realities" Kunst Nu 87-5 1987
- Norden, Linda Similia/Dissimilia:"Carel Balth" Similia/Dissimilia, pp. 69–73 1987
- Kouwenhoven, Frank "De schilderijen van Carel Balth, het vangen van licht" Cicero nr. 8. Leiden 1986
- Stachelhaus, Heiner Foto oder Malerei – das ist die Frage Neue Ruhr Zeitung, Essen 1986
- Van Mulders, Wim "Fictions of a Clear Conscience" Groninger Museum, Groningen. Museum Folkwang Essen Carel Balth: The Next Stage of Knowing pp. 7–24, 31- 53 1986
- Scheers-Simons, Marijke "Carel Balth" De Bouwadviseur, nr. 7/8 pp. 28–31 1985
- Balth, Carel "A way in painting? "Arte Factum, nr. 6, Antwerp, pp. 48-50 1984
- Daval, Jean-Luc In: La Photographie, Histoire d'un Art. Albert Skira, Geneva, pp. 249 1982
- Caroli, Flavio Enciclopedia, il magico primario in Europa. Galleria Civica, Modena 1981
- Piller, Micky “The Light and Dark Side of Carel Balth’s Reality” Carel Balth: Towards a Monumental Lyricism. pp. 5–14 1980
- Art Actuel. Editions d’Art Albert Skira, Geneva Skira Annuel 5. 1979
- Debbaut, Jan / Liat, Kwee Swan / Wintgens, Doris / Balth, Carel
- Carel Balth, Light-Photoworks, Transitions and Diptychs. Van Abbemuseum, Eindhoven 1978
- Peters, Phillip “Tekenen met Licht” Kunstbeeld. Amsterdam 1978
- Rotzler, Willy “Calculated Phantasy”. Rizzoli, Inc. New York Constructive Concepts, pp. 203 1977
- Balth, Carel Catalogue Museum Folkwang, Essen 1974
- Kerber, Bernhard “Carel Balth” Art International XVIII nr. 4, pp. 48–49 1974
- Daval, Jean-Luc In: La Photographie, Histoire d'un Art. Lugano Edition d'Art Albert Skira, Geneva, pp. 249 1974
- Stachelhaus, Heiner “Seeing and Understanding Light. Notes on the Work of Carel Balth” Carel Balth: The Art of Seeing pp. 1–20 1974
- Kerber, Bernhard “Works between painting and relief” Carel Balth: The Art of Seeing, pp. 20–25 1974
- Odenhausen, Helmut “Giochi di luce e di superfice” Acciaio, Acier, Stahl, Steel, nr. 1 1970
