= Taku Satoh =

Japanese graphic designer (born 1955)

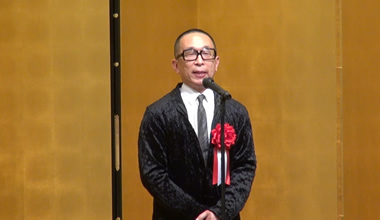

Taku Satoh (佐藤卓, Satō Taku; born 1955) is a Japanese graphic designer born in Tokyo. He graduated in 1979 from Tokyo National University of Fine Arts and Music (currently Tokyo University of the Arts) in the Department of Design. He completed his master's degree in 1981. In 1984 he founded Taku Satoh Design Office after working at Dentsu Inc. His work in graphic design includes "Pleats Please Issey Miyake" and the logos of the 21st Century Museum of Contemporary Art, Kanazawa and the National Museum of Nature and Science, Tokyo.

Along with Issey Miyake, Naoto Fukasawa and Noriko Kawakami, he is director of 21 21 Design Sight in Tokyo, where he curated their second exhibition, "Water," in 2007, and "Design Ah!" in 2013. In 2014, he directed the exhibition "Kome: The Art Of Rice" with anthropologist Shinichi Takemura.

In 2016, Satoh directed the exhibition "Design Anatomy, a method for seeing the world through familiar objects" at 21 21 Design Sight.

== Television appearances ==
2026 Sekai ga horeta zeppin! Sho–case (with Sho Sakurai)
