= Babette Pinsky =

American clothing designer

- Born: New York City, New York, U.S.
- Education: Fashion Institute of Technology
- Occupation: Clothing designer
- Spouse: Steven Pinsky

Babette Pinsky is an American clothing designer known for creating Babette, a defunct line of upscale women's clothing produced and designed by Pinsky in Oakland, California and sold across the United States in department stores, boutique shops and an eponymous chain of Babette stores. Pinsky owned and managed the business in partnership with her husband, Steven Pinsky. They closed the business in 2016.

== Early life and education ==
Pinsky was born and raised in New York City. Her French mother gave her the French name, Babette. She graduated from the Fashion Institute of Technology. She moved to San Francisco in 1968 with her first husband.

== Career ==
Pinsky founded Babette in 1968. Her husband, Steven, joined the company in 1990. In the early years, her pleated fabrics were created by a pleating factory in San Francisco. The Pinskys bought the factory in 1995. The company later moved to a larger factory in Oakland, California, where Pinsky designed and produced clothing in a 25,000- square-foot second-floor manufacturing facility on West Grand Avenue in West Oakland, employing 10 seamstresses and a number of other workers, including master pleater Leung Tang, an immigrant from Hong Kong.

The line was carried in hundreds of department stores and boutiques, and in Babette shops in San Francisco, Manhattan, Chicago, San Jose, Washington, D.C., Minneapolis and other cities. By 2014, there were nine Babette stores.

Pinsky's signature style featured what was then a "unique accordion-like pleating style" heat-pressed into microfiber fabrics. As the company grew, Pinsky employed co-designer Josephine Tchang. A single piece can have 3 different kinds of pleating.

San Francisco Chronicle fashion editor Sylvia Rubin credits Pinsky together with Issey Miyake with "reinventing" the Fortuny pleat in the 1980s. Rubin describes Pinsky as using "Fortuny pleats, knife pleats, cube pleats, flower pleats, chevron pleats, box pleats - or a combination of any or more of the above," in her designs.

Pinsky is noted for designing, in the 1980s, an intricately pleated, architectural, trapezoidal-shaped raincoat with a metallic sheen.

In 2008 the Weisman Art Museum in Minneapolis held a special exhibit on Pinsky's designs.
