= Abstract photography =

Photography genre

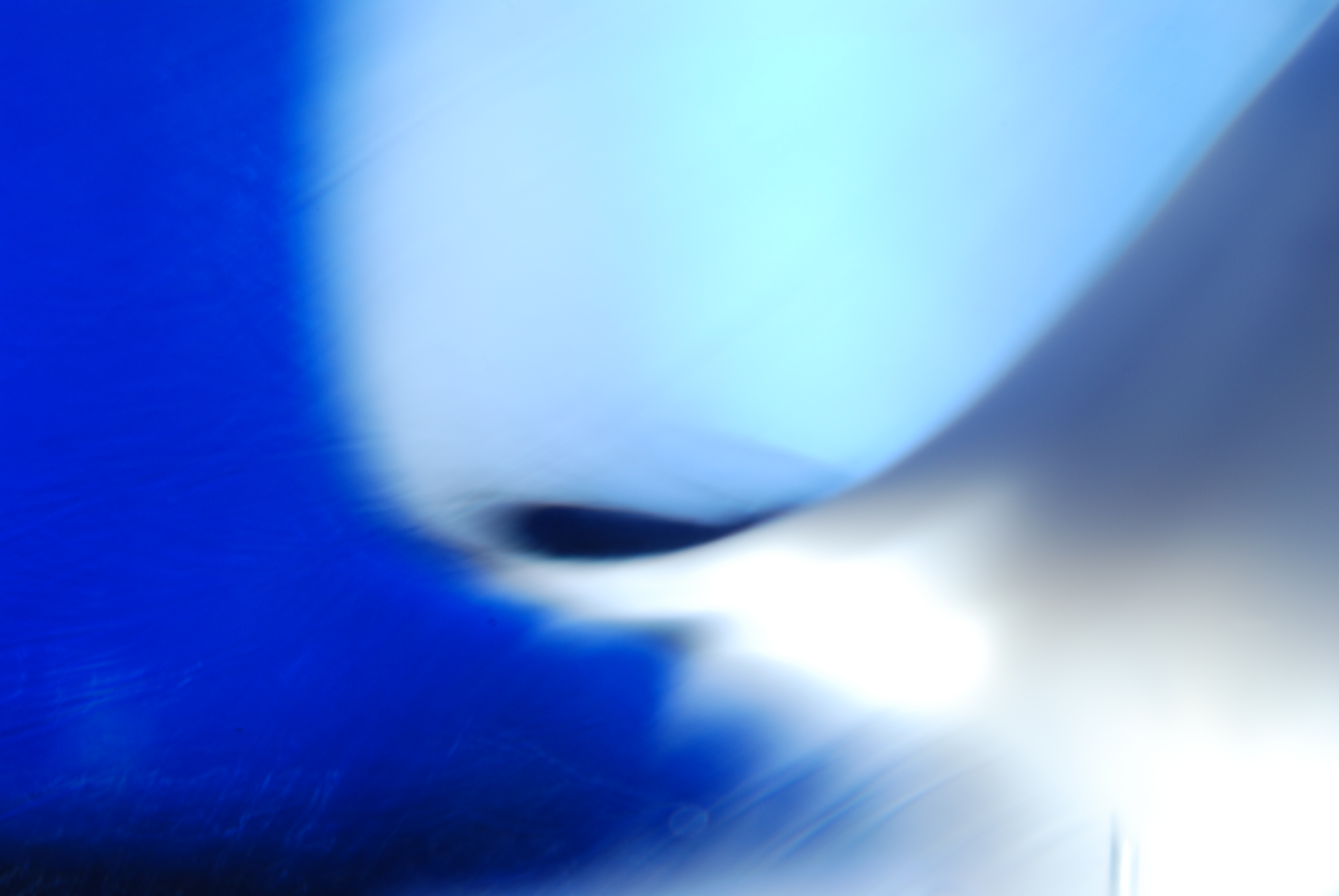
This macroscopic photograph distinguishes little information about the nature of its object

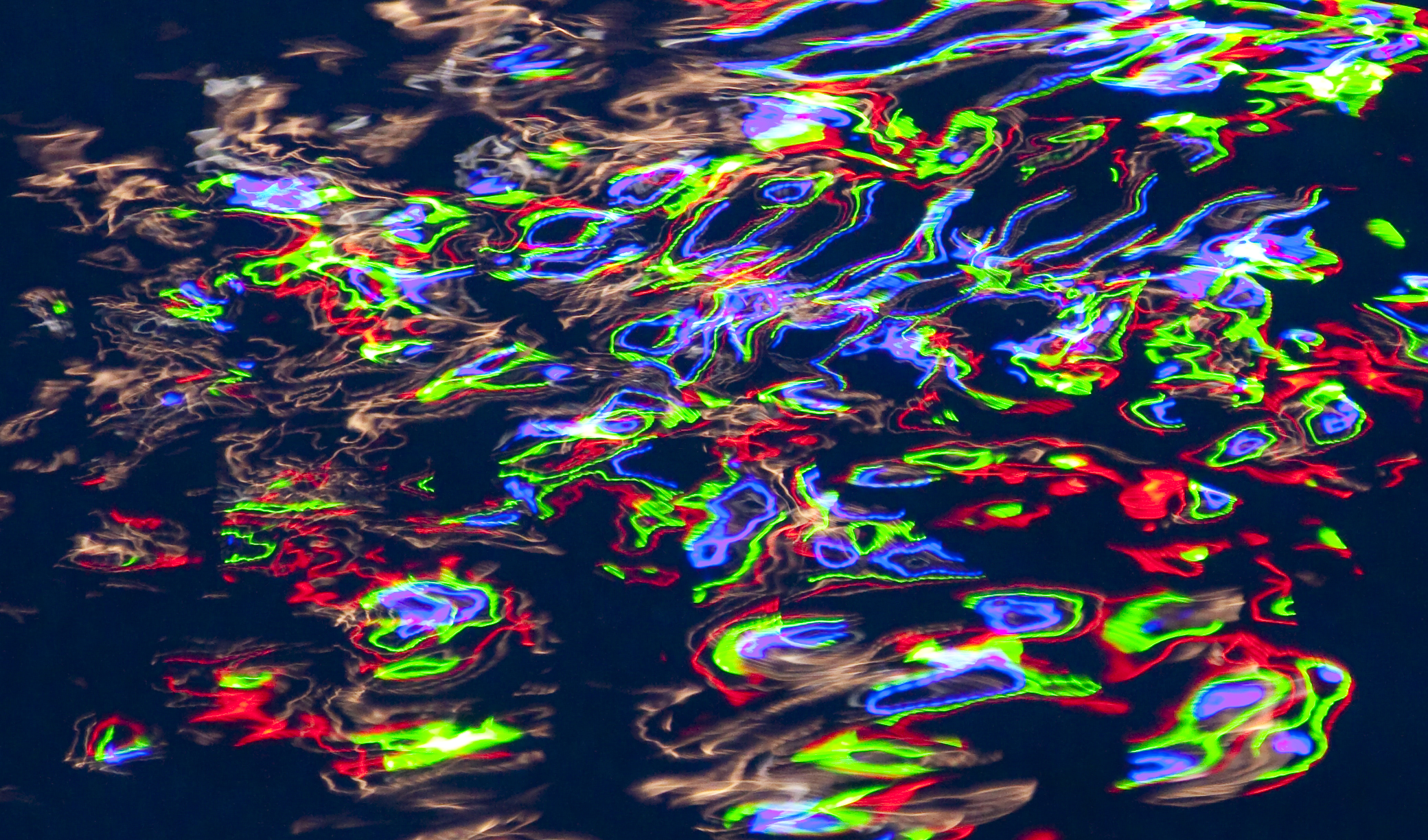
Reflection and motion combine as a stage for lighting to become abstract

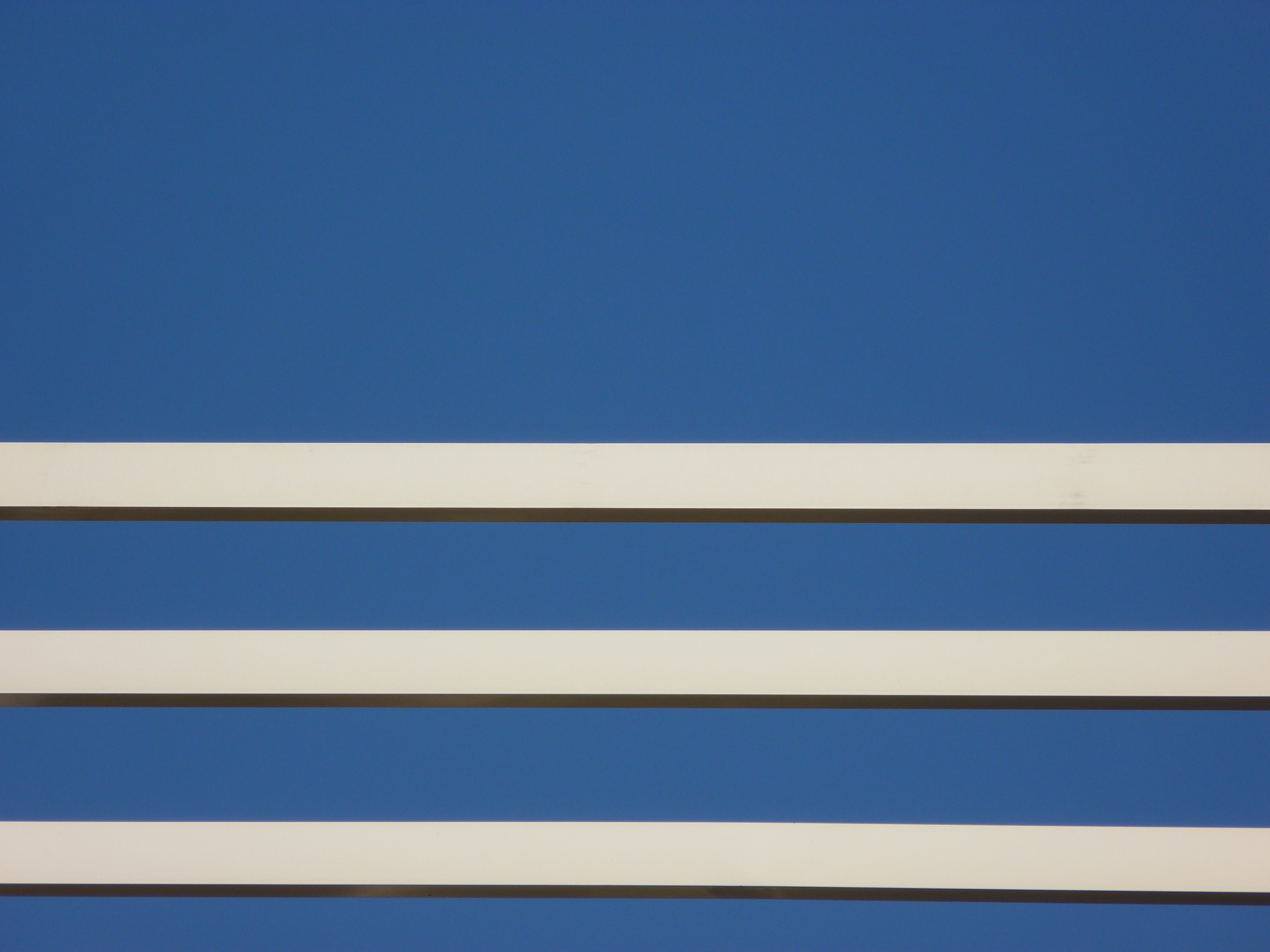
The type of this structure is not depicted

Abstract photography, sometimes called non-objective, experimental or conceptual photography, is a means of depicting a visual image that does not have an immediate association with the object world and that has been created through the use of photographic equipment, processes or materials. An abstract photograph may isolate a fragment of a natural scene to remove its inherent context from the viewer, it may be purposely staged to create a seemingly unreal appearance from real objects, or it may involve the use of color, light, shadow, texture, shape and/or form to convey a feeling, sensation or impression. The image may be produced using traditional photographic equipment like a camera, darkroom or computer, or it may be created without using a camera by directly manipulating film, paper or other photographic media, including digital presentations.

== Defining abstract photography ==
There has been no commonly used definition of the term "abstract photography". Books and articles on the subject include everything from a completely representational image of an abstract subject matter, such as Aaron Siskind's photographs of peeling paint, to entirely non-representational imagery created without a camera or film, such as Marco Breuer's fabricated prints and books. The term is both inclusive of a wide range of visual representations and explicit in its categorization of a type of photography that is visibly ambiguous by its very nature.

Many photographers, critics, art historians and others have written or spoken about abstract photography without attempting to formalize a specific meaning. Alvin Langdon Coburn in 1916 proposed that an exhibition be organized with the title "Abstract Photography", for which the entry form would clearly state that "no work will be admitted in which the interest of the subject matter is greater than the appreciation of the extraordinary." The proposed exhibition did not happen, yet Coburn later created some distinctly abstract photographs.

Photographer and Professor of Psychology John Suler, in his essay Photographic Psychology: Image and Psyche, said that "An abstract photograph draws away from that which is realistic or literal. It draws away from natural appearances and recognizable subjects in the actual world. Some people even say it departs from true meaning, existence, and reality itself. It stands apart from the concrete whole with its purpose instead depending on conceptual meaning and intrinsic form....Here's the acid test: If you look at a photo and there's a voice inside you that says 'What is it?'….Well, there you go. It's an abstract photograph."

Barbara Kasten, also a photographer and professor, wrote that "Abstract photography challenges our popular view of photography as an objective image of reality by reasserting its constructed nature....Freed from its duty to represent, abstract photography continues to be a catchall genre for the blending of mediums and disciplines. It is an arena to test photography."

German photographer and photographic theorist Gottfried Jäger used the term "concrete photography", playing off the term "concrete art", to describe a particular kind of abstract photography. He said:

- "Concrete photography does not depict the visible (like realistic or documentary photography);
- it does not represent the non-visible (like staged, depictive photography);
- it does not take recourse to views (like image-analytical, conceptual, demonstrative photography).
- Instead it establishes visibility. It is only visible, the only-visible.
- In this way it abandons its media character and gains object character."

More recently conceptual artist Mel Bochner hand wrote a quote from the Encyclopædia Britannica that said "Photography cannot record abstract ideas." on a note card, then photographed it and printed it using six different photographic processes. He turned the words, the concept and the visualization of the concept into art itself, and in doing so created a work that presented yet another type of abstract photography, again without ever defining the term itself.

== History ==
=== 19th century ===
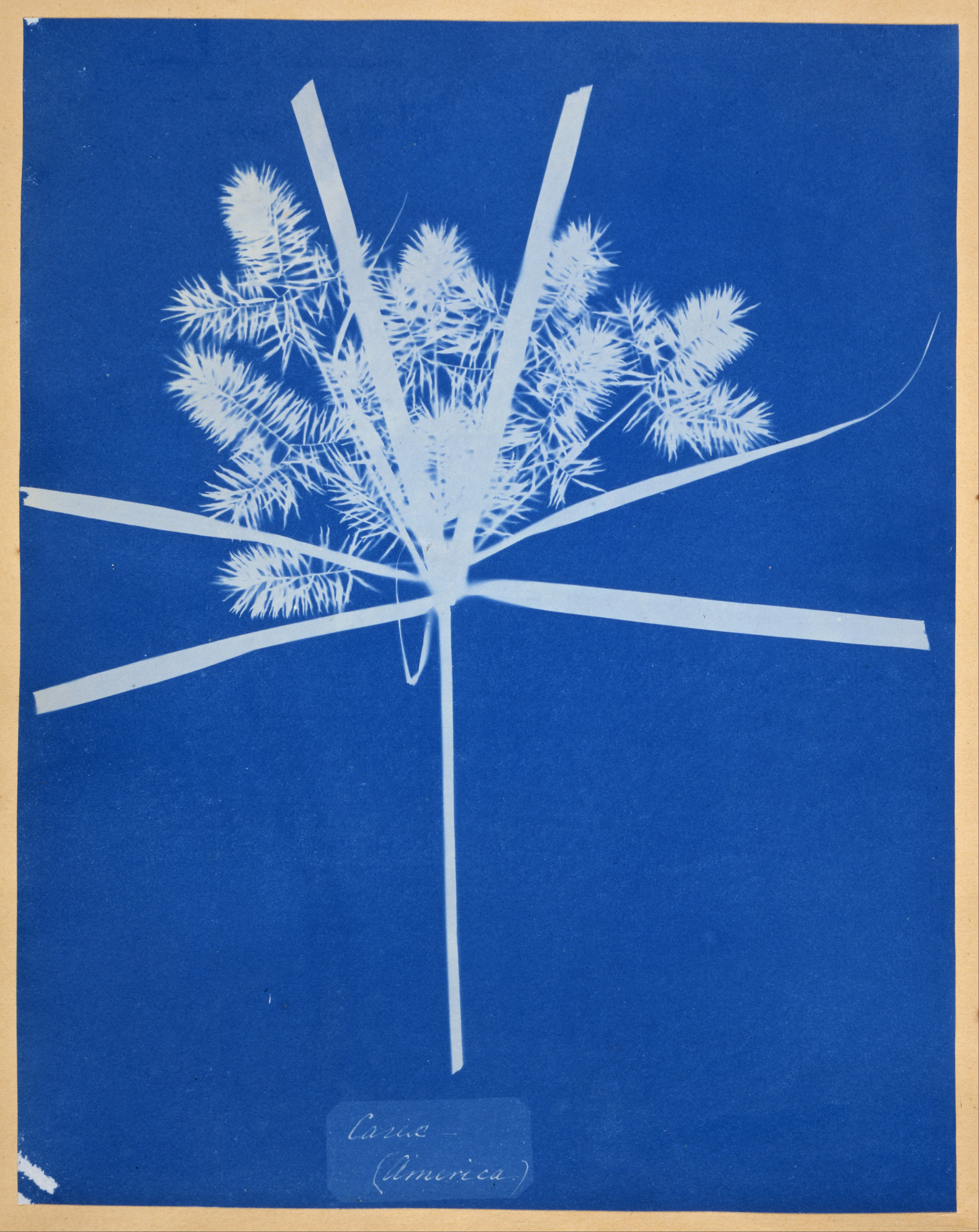
Anna Atkins – Carex (America) – Google Art Project

Some of the earliest images of what may be called abstract photography appeared within the first decade after the invention of the craft. In 1842 John William Draper created images with a spectroscope, which dispersed light rays into a then previously unrecorded visible pattern. The prints he made had no reference to the reality of the visible world that other photographers then recorded, and they demonstrated photography's unprecedented ability to transform what had previously been invisible into a tangible presence. Draper saw his images as science records rather than art, but their artistic quality is appreciated today for their groundbreaking status and their intrinsic individuality.

Another early photographer, Anna Atkins in England, produced a self-published book of photograms made by placing dried algae directly on cyanotype paper. Intended as a scientific study, the stark white on blue images have an ethereal abstract quality due to the negative imaging and lack of natural context for the plants.

The discovery of the X-ray in 1895 and radioactivity in 1896 caused a great public fascination with things that were previously invisible or unseen. In response, photographers began to explore how they could capture what could not be seen by normal human vision.

About this same time Swedish author and artist August Strindberg experimented with subjecting saline solutions on photographic plates to heat and cold. The images he produced with these experiments were indefinite renderings of what could not otherwise be seen and were thoroughly abstract in their presentation.

Near the turn of the century Louis Daguerre in France tried to capture images of mental processes by pressing unexposed plates to the foreheads of sitters and urging them to project images from their minds onto the plates. The photographs he produced were blurry and indefinite, yet Daguerre was convinced that what he called "thought vibrations" were indistinguishable from light rays.

=== 20th century ===
During the first decade of the 20th century there was a wave of artistic exploration that hastened the transition in painting and sculpture from Impressionism and Post-Impressionism to Cubism and Futurism. Beginning in 1903 a series of annual art exhibitions in Paris called the Salon d'Automne introduced the public to then radical vision of artists like Cézanne, Picasso, Marcel Duchamp, Francis Picabia, František Kupka, Albert Gleizes, and Jean Metzinger. A decade later the Armory Show in New York created a scandal by showing completely abstract works by Kandinsky, Braque, Duchamp, Robert Delaunay and others.

The public's interest in and sometimes repulsion to abstract art was duly noted by some of the more creative photographers of the period. By 1910, in New York Alfred Stieglitz began to show abstract painters like Marsden Hartley and Arthur Dove at his 291 art gallery, which had previously exhibited only pictorial photography. Photographers like Stieglitz, Paul Strand and Edward Steichen all experimented with depictive subjects photographed in abstract compositions.

Man Ray – Lampshade, 1920

The first publicly exhibited images that are now recognized as abstract photographs were a series called Symmetrical Patterns from Natural Forms, shown by Erwin Quedenfeldt in Cologne in 1914. Two years later Alvin Langdon Coburn began experimenting with a series he called Vortographs. During one six-week period in 1917 he took about two dozen photographs with a camera outfitted with a multi-faceted prism. The resulting images were purposely unrelated to the realities he saw and to his previous portraits and cityscapes. He wrote "Why should not the camera throw off the shackles of contemporary representations…? Why, I ask you earnestly, need we go on making commonplace little exposures…?"

In the 1920s and 1930s there was a significant increase in the number of photographers who explored abstract imagery. In Europe, Prague became a center of avant-garde photography, with František Drtikol, Jaroslav Rössler, Josef Sudek and Jaromír Funke all creating photographs influenced by Cubism and Futurism. Rössler's images in particular went beyond representational abstraction to pure abstractions of light and shadow.

In Germany and later in the U.S. László Moholy-Nagy, a leader of the Bauhaus school of modernism, experimented with the abstract qualities of the photogram. He said that "the most astonishing possibilities remain to be discovered in the raw material of photograph" and that photographers "must learn to seek, not the 'picture,' not the esthetic of tradition, but the ideal instrument of expression, the self-sufficient vehicle for education."

Some photographers during this time also pushed the boundaries of conventional imagery by incorporating the visions of surrealism or futurism into their work. Man Ray, Maurice Tabard, André Kertész, Curtis Moffat and Filippo Masoero were some of the best known artists who produced startling imagery that questioned both reality and perspective.

Both during and after World War II photographers such as Minor White, Aaron Siskind, Henry Holmes Smith and Lotte Jacobi explored compositions of found objects in ways that demonstrated even our natural world has elements of abstraction embedded in it.

Frederick Sommer broke new ground in 1950 by photographing purposely rearranged found objects, resulting in ambiguous images that could be widely interpreted. He chose to title one particular enigmatic image The Sacred Wood, after T. S. Eliot's essay on criticism and meaning.

The 1960s were marked uninhibited explorations in to the limits of photographic media at the time, starting with photographers who assembled or re-assembled their own and/or found images, such as Ray K. Metzker, Robert Heinecken and Walter Chappell.

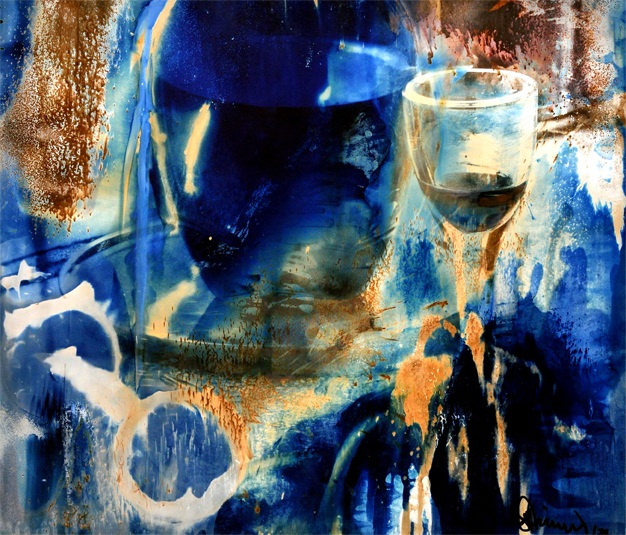
Josef H. Neumann: Chemogram Gustav I 1976

In the mid-1970s Josef H. Neumann developed chemograms, which are products of both photographic processing and painting on photographic paper. Before the spread of computers and the use of image processing software the process of creating chemograms can be considered an early form of analog post-production, in which the original image is altered after the enlarging process. Unlike works of digital post-production each chemogram is a unique piece.

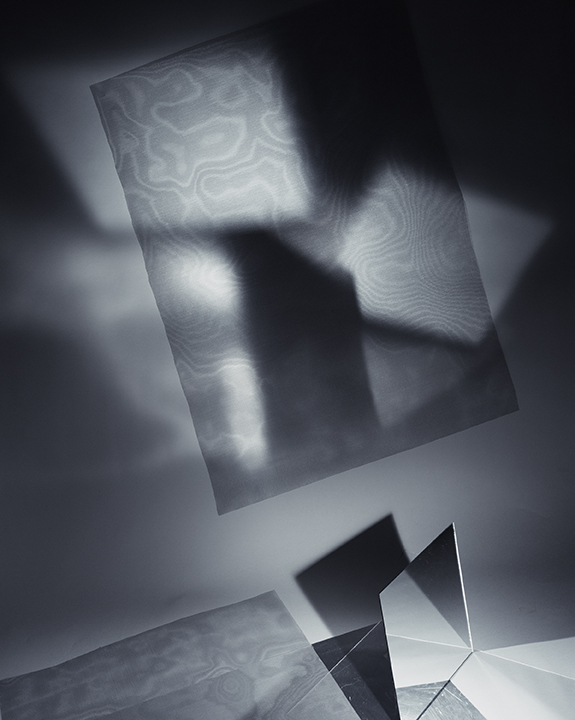
Barbara Kasten – Scene III, 2012

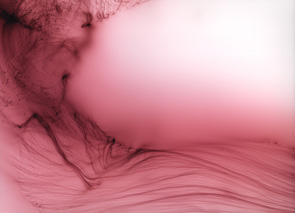
Wolfgang Tillmans – Freischwimmer 26, 2003

Beginning in the late 1970s photographers stretched the limits of both scale and surface in what was then traditional photographic media that had to be developed in a darkroom. Inspired by the work of Moholy-Nagy, Susan Rankaitis first began embedding found images from scientific textbooks into large-scale photograms, creating has been called "a palimpsest that has to be explored almost like an archeological excavation." Later she produced enormous interactive gallery constructions that expanded the physical and conceptual notions of what a photograph might be. Her work was said to "mimic the fragmentation of the contemporary mind."

By the 1990s a new wave of photographers were exploring the possibilities of using computers to create new ways of creating photographs. Photographers such as Thomas Ruff, Barbara Kasten, Tom Friedman, and Carel Balth were creating works that combined photography, sculpture, printmaking and computer-generated images.

=== 21st century ===
Once computers and photography software became widely available, the boundaries of abstract photography were expanded beyond the limits of film and chemistry into almost limitless dimensions. Any boundaries that remained between pure artists and pure photographers were eliminated by individuals who worked exclusively in photography but produced only computer-generated images. Among the most well-known of the early 21st century generation were Gaston Bertin, Penelope Umbrico, Ard Bodewes, Ellen Carey, Nicki Stager, Shirine Gill, Thomas Ruff, Andrew Prokos, Wolfgang Tillmans, Kim Keever, Harvey Lloyd, and Adam Broomberg and Oliver Chanarin.
