= Issey Miyake =

Japanese fashion designer (1938–2022)

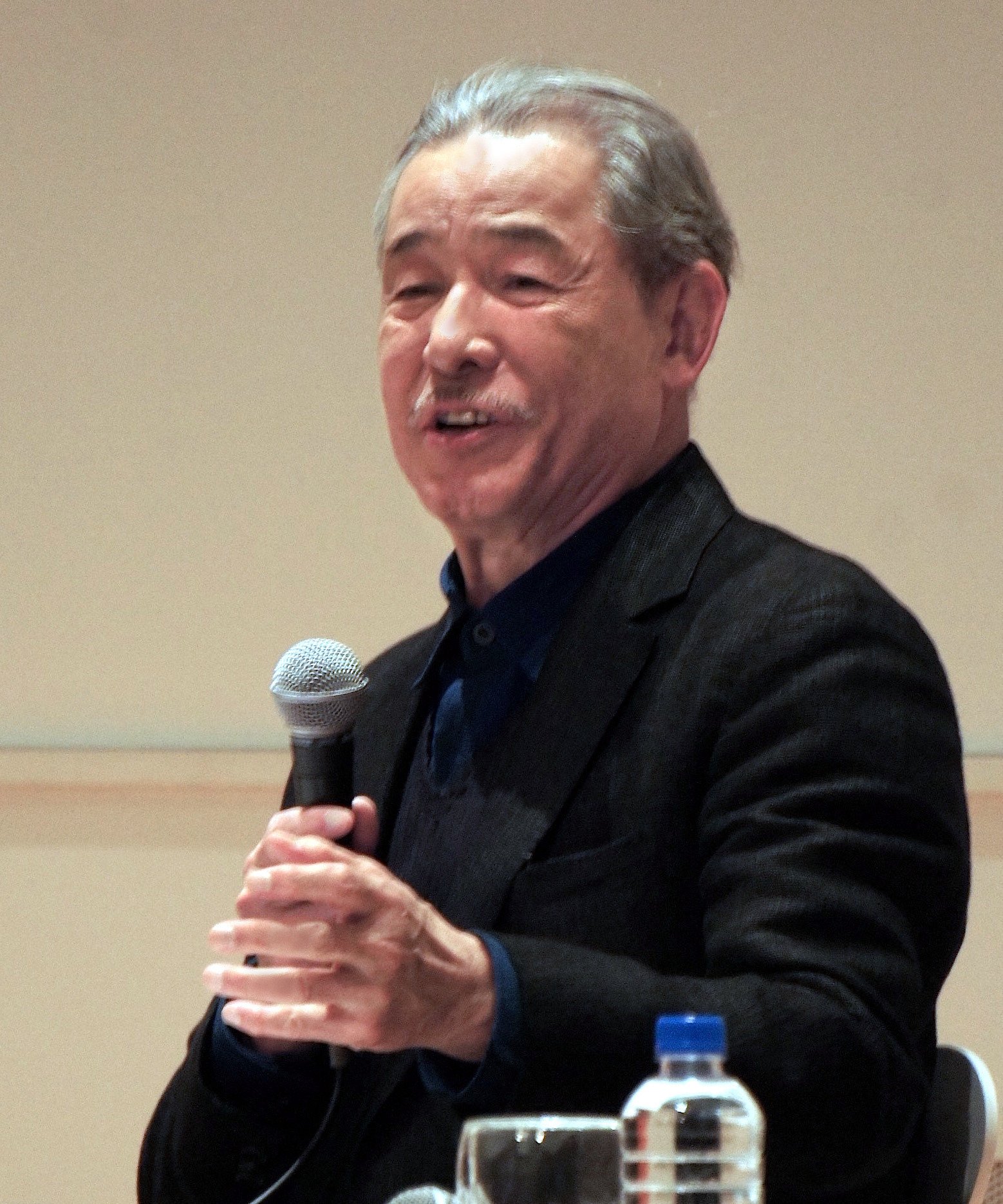
- Miyake in Tokyo, 2016
- Born: Kazunaru Miyake; 22 April 1938; Hiroshima, Empire of Japan
- Died: 5 August 2022 (aged 84); Tokyo, Japan
- Education: Tama Art University
- Notable work: Pleats, Please; Bao Bao bags; L'eau d'Issey
- Awards: Praemium Imperiale

Issey Miyake (Japanese: 三宅 一生, Hepburn: Miyake Issei; [mijake iꜜsseː] 22 April 1938 – 5 August 2022) was a Japanese fashion designer. He was known for his technology-driven clothing designs, notably the Pleats, Please line, exhibitions and fragrances such as L'eau d'Issey.

== Early life and education ==
Miyake was born Kazunaru Miyake (三宅 一生, Miyake Kazunaru) on 22 April 1938 in Hiroshima. He was still living in the city seven years later when the U.S. military dropped an atomic bomb there in August 1945, which led to his mother's death. He first disclosed this in 2009, when Barack Obama advocated for global nuclear disarmament.

As a child, Miyake wanted to become a dancer. His interest in fashion started by studying his sister's fashion magazines. He studied graphic design at the Tama Art University in Tokyo, graduating in 1964. He entered designs into fashion competition at the Bunka Fashion College in Tokyo. However, he did not win a competition due to his lack of pattern-making or sewing skills. After graduation, he enrolled in the Chambre syndicale de la couture parisienne school in Paris and was apprenticed to Guy Laroche as assistant designer. He also worked with Hubert de Givenchy, drawing 50 to 100 sketches daily.

== Career ==
In 1969, Miyake moved to New York City, where he met Christo, Robert Rauschenberg, Joe Eula and Donna Jordan. He was enrolled in English classes at Columbia University and worked on Seventh Avenue for designer Geoffrey Beene. Returning to Tokyo in 1970, he founded the Miyake Design Studio, a high-end producer of women's fashion.

From a young age, Miyake respected artist Isamu Noguchi, whose novelty and sense of fun in his designs inspired Miyake. He was also inspired by fashion designer Madeleine Vionnet's use of geometric calculations and "a single piece of beautiful cloth". In Paris, he visited several museums and he mentioned that he was influenced by sculptors such as Constantin Brâncuși and Alberto Giacometti.

In the late 1980s, Miyake began to experiment with new methods of pleating that would allow both flexibility of movement for the wearer as well as ease of care and production. The garments are cut and sewn first, then sandwiched between layers of paper and fed into a heat press, where they are pleated. The fabric's 'memory' holds the pleats and when the garments are liberated from their paper cocoon, they are ready-to wear.

Miyake had a long friendship with Austrian-born pottery artist Dame Lucie Rie. She presented him with her archival ceramic buttons, which he integrated into his designs.

For 13 years from 1986, Miyake collaborated with photographer Irving Penn.

Miyake also developed a friendship with Apple's Steve Jobs, who came to him after seeing the uniforms Miyake designed for employees of Sony's factories. At Jobs's request, Miyake designed similar vests for Apple employees, but Jobs encountered strong opposition to the idea of a uniform. Nonetheless, Miyake went on to produce the black turtlenecks which would become a part of Jobs' signature attire. Jobs said, "So I asked Issey to make me some of his black turtlenecks that I liked, and he made me like a hundred of them."

Fashion designer Geoffrey Beene stated that he admired Issey Miyake for Miyake's technique, this in an interview with poet/artist Steven Vita in Veery journal, 1991.

In March 1992, Miyake was quoted in the International Herald Tribune as saying "Design is not for philosophy—it's for life."

Between 1996 and 1999, Miyake collaborated with artists for his Guest Artist series. The first collaboration was with the photographer and collage maker Yasumasa Morimura; the other artists were Nobuyoshi Araki, Tim Hawkinson, and Cai Guo-Qiang. Miyake stated that his intention was not to answer the question "Is fashion art?" but instead to create an "interactive relationship" between the art and the people who admired it. By wearing the artworks upon their bodies, the wearers interacted with fashion and art simultaneously.

Miyake was also one of the co-Directors of 21 21 Design Sight, Japan's first design museum.

Miyake died of liver cancer on 5 August 2022, at the age of 84.

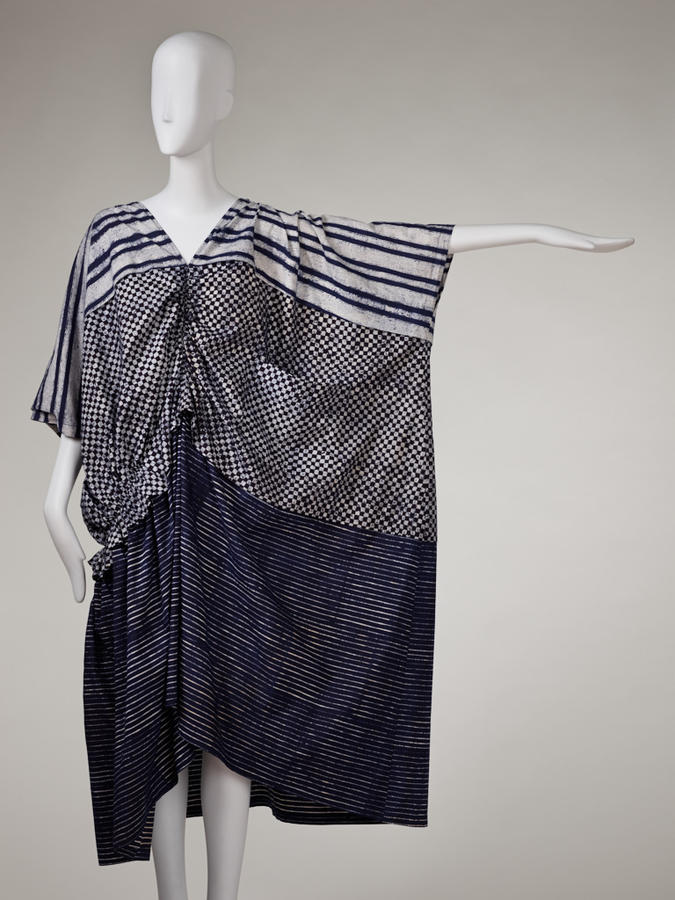
1984 'Indigo Batik' cotton kaftan dress, RISD Museum

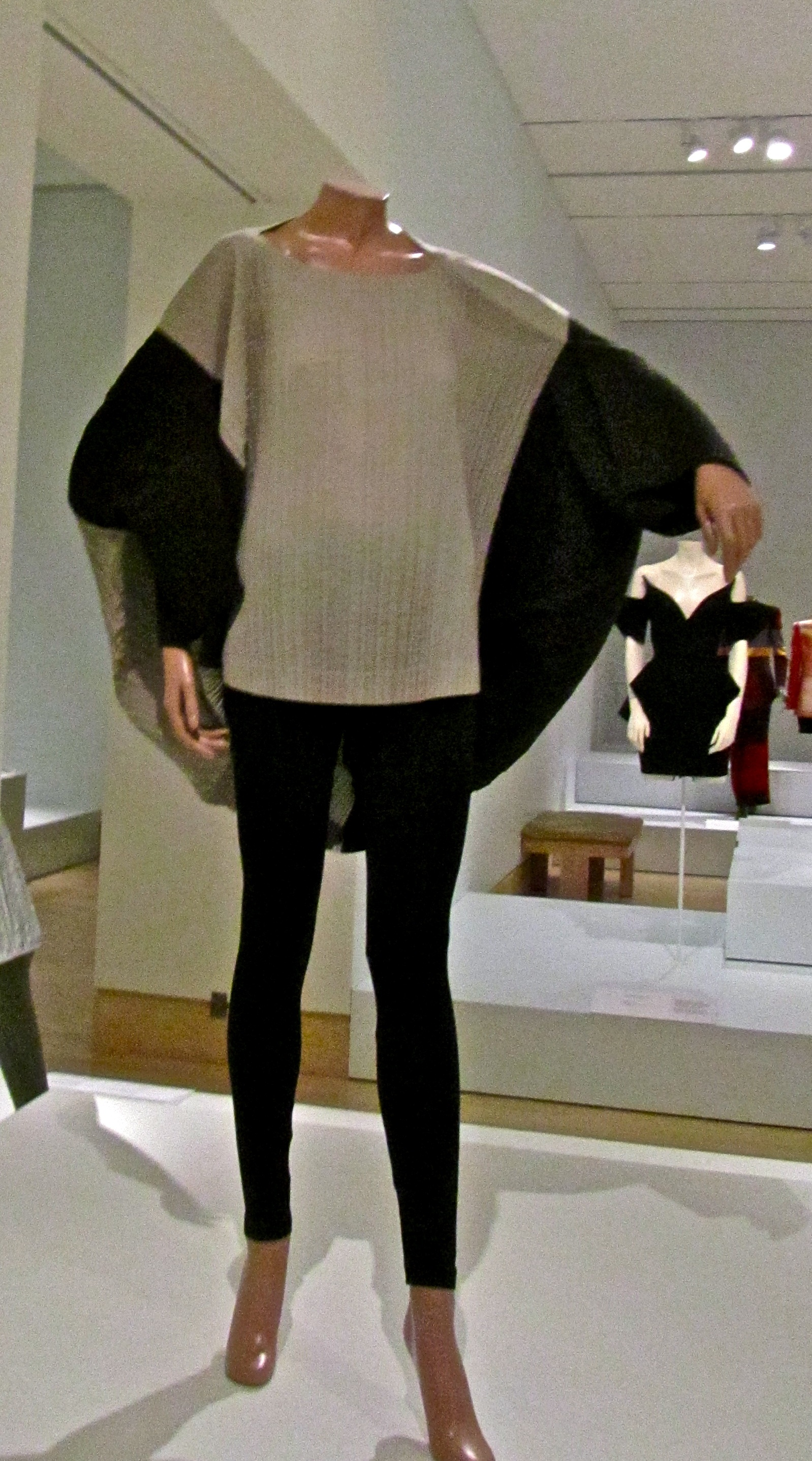
1990 'Rhythm Pleats' collection

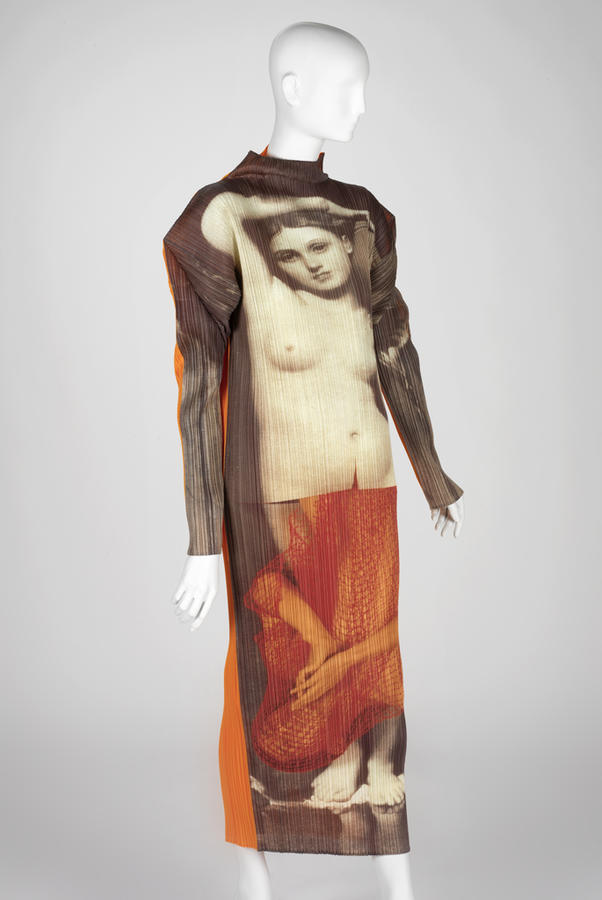
1996-7 'Guest Artist' design, Yasumasa Morimura for Miyake, RISD Museum

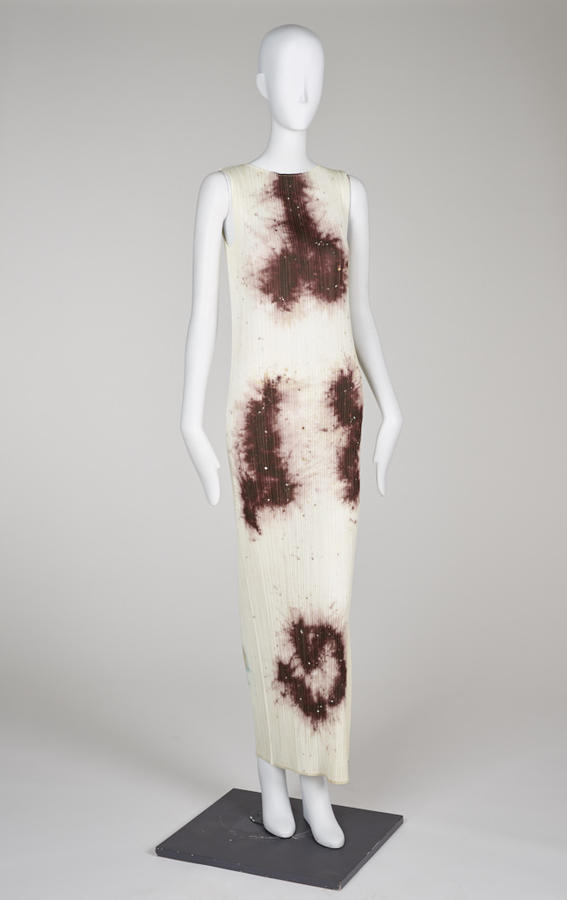
1998 'Guest Artist' design, Cai Guo-Qiang for Miyake, RISD Museum

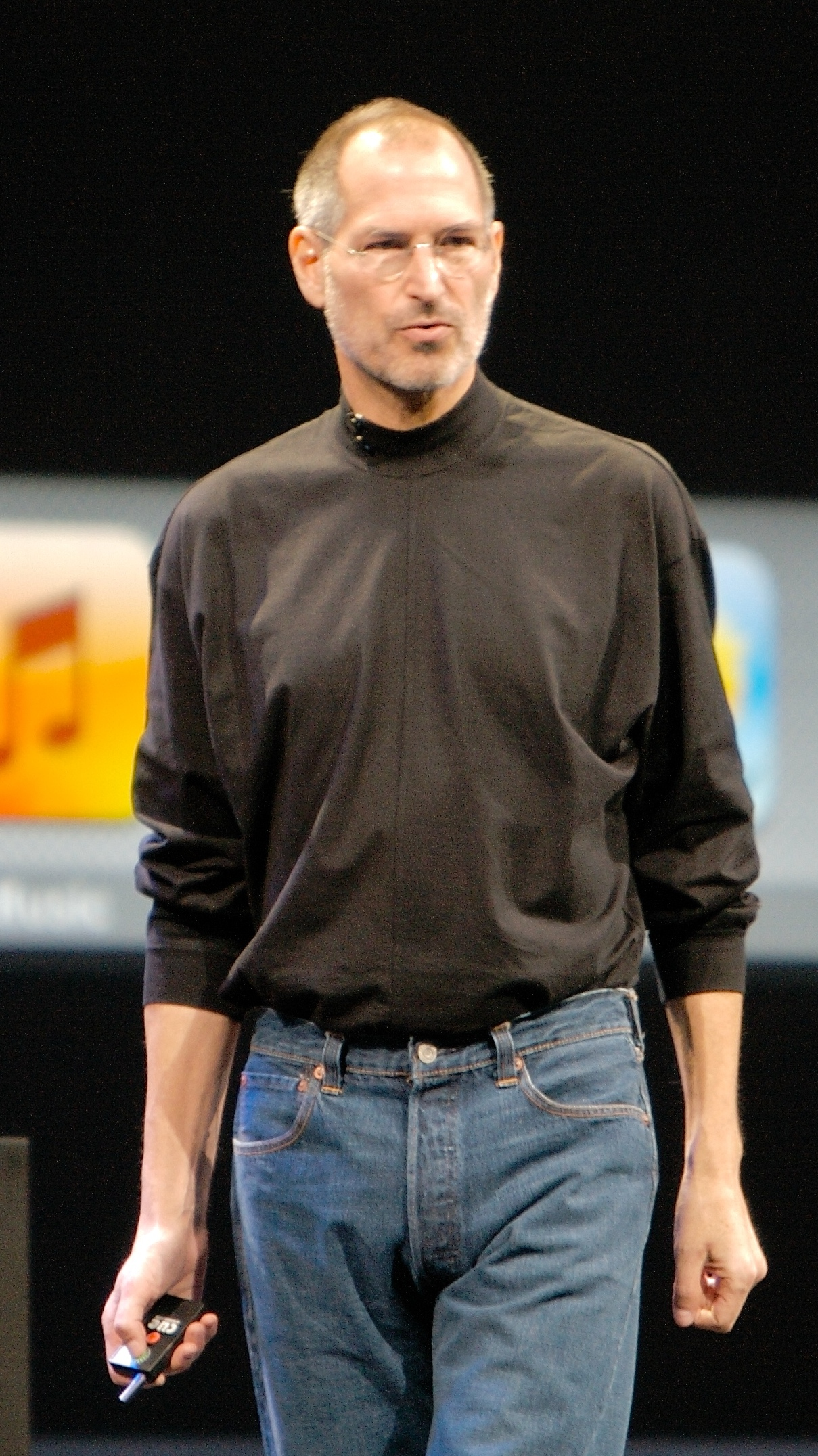
Steve Jobs wearing his signature black mock turtle neck by Issey Miyake

== Issey Miyake ==
=== Main line ===
Issey Miyake is the main collection line, subdivided into men (since 1978/85) and women (since 1971) collections.

The first Issey Miyake collection, for fall 1971, featured a dress with a Japanese-style tattoo print of Janis Joplin and Jimi Hendrix created by Makiko Minagawa, an artist who joined the studio staff.

In 1991, for Ballett Frankfurt, Miyake designed costumes of permanently pleated ultra-featherweight polyester jersey for William Forsythe's The Loss of Small Detail; during the work the male and female dancers exchanged pants for skirts and vice versa. He sent 200 to 300 garments for the dancers to wear a different one in each performance. This led to the development of the Pleats, Please range and inspired him to use dancers to display his work.

He released his Pleats, Please line in 1993. The clothes offer an unusual freedom of movement; they are made of extremely fine polyester fabric, with cascades of thin, sharp permanent pleats created with a proprietary heat treatment, an undefined waist, and rarely any zippers or other fastenings. They are machine washable and can be wadded up without loss of shape. Miyake said he hoped that wearing them would also loosen inhibitions. They became his most recognizable look. San Francisco Chronicle fashion editor Sylvia Rubin credited Miyake together with Babette Pinsky with "reinventing" the Mariano Fortuny pleat.

In 1994 and 1999, Miyake turned over the design of the men's and women's collections respectively, to his associate, Naoki Takizawa, so that he could return to research full-time. In 2007, Naoki Takizawa opened his own brand supported by the Issey Miyake Group and was replaced as Creative Director by Dai Fujiwara, who ran the House of Issey Miyake until 2012. The design duties were split as of the Spring/Summer 2012 collections, with Yoshiyuki Miyamae appointed head designer of the women's collection and Yusuke Takahashi designing the men's line.

=== Other lines and brands ===
Miyake "oversaw the overall direction of all lines created by his company", even though the individual collections have been designed by his staff since his 'retirement' from the fashion world in 1997.

- Issey Miyake Fête – colorful women's line that "draws on the technological innovations of Pleats Please" (Fête means 'celebration' in French) (since 2004)
- Pleats Please Issey Miyake – polyester jersey garments for women that are first "cut and sewn and then pleated [...] (normally, fabric is first pleated and then cut and sewn [...])" "to permanently retain washboard rows of horizontal, vertical or diagonal knife-edge pleats". Miyake patented the technique in 1993
- HaaT – women's line, designed by Miyake's former textile designer, Makiko Minagawa. HaaT means 'village market' in Sanskrit, and the word sounds similar to 'heart' in English
- A-POC – 1998– custom collection for men and women. Tubes of fabric are machine-processed and can be cut into various shapes by the consumer. A-POC is an acronym of 'a piece of cloth', and a near homophone of 'epoch'.
- A-POC Trampoline – ensemble of jacket, pants, jacket, and stole created with Ron Arad that also form a cover for Arad's Ripple chair.
- 132 5. Issey Miyake – an evolution of the A-POC concept. Works are presented as two-dimensional geometric shapes made from recycled polyethylene terephthalate mixed with natural fibers and dyes, which then unfold into structured garments. (since 2014)
- APOC Able – a further evolution of the A-POC concept centered around advanced and innovative weaving technologies (since 2020)
- me Issey Miyake – line of "exclusive one-sized shirts that stretch to fit the wearer" that are sold in a plastic tube, named Cauliflower for the non-Asian market. (since 2001)
- Homme Plisse – men's clothing in the signature Issey Miyake pleating (since 2013)
- IM Men – men's line for casual wear (since 2020); the brand's logo, developed by graphic designer Taku Satoh, consists of an IM motif that was originally designed by Ikko Tanaka in 1979 and was previously used for non-clothing products
- Bao Bao Issey Miyake – line of bags
- Issey Miyake Watches – men's and women's watches
- Issey Miyake Perfumes – line of fragrances for men and women. See below
- Evian by Issey Miyake – Limited edition bottle designed by Issey Miyake for Evian water.
- Issey Miyake maintained a freestanding store, named ELTTOB TEP Issey Miyake (reverse of 'Pet Bottle') in Osaka, where the full array of lines is available.
- Issey Skyline – produced in limited quantities to promote the release of the Nissan Skyline in 1982.

=== Perfumes ===
Like many fashion designers, Issey Miyake also had a line of perfumes. His first fragrance, L'eau d'Issey, was created by perfumer Jacques Cavallier.

The scent was followed by L'eau d'Issey Pour Homme (for men) in 1994. L'eau Bleue d'Issey Pour Homme was introduced in 2004; and its evolution, L'eau Bleue d'Issey Eau Fraiche was introduced in 2006. Every year from 2007 on, Issey Miyake brought out a "limited time only" fragrance for ladies, for which he brought in a "guest" perfumer. In 2007, he launched 'Drop on a Petal', and in 2008 he launched 'Reflections in a Drop'. A new Issey Miyake men's fragrance, L'eau d'Issey Pour Homme Intense, was introduced at Nordstrom in the United States in June 2007, with a larger worldwide rollout following in September 2007. Issey Miyake fragrances are produced under a long-term agreement by the Beauté Prestige International division of Shiseido.

=== Other activities ===
In 1992, Issey Miyake designed the Lithuanian national team's official uniform for the 1992 Summer Olympics in Barcelona.

== Miyake Issey Foundation ==
The Miyake Issey Foundation, founded in Tokyo in 2004, operates the 21_21 Design Sight center, organizes exhibitions and events, and publishes literature.

21 21 Design Sight (a play on 20/20 vision) is a museum-style research center for design, constructed by Tadao Ando, that was opened in Roppongi, Tokyo in March 2007. The center was headed by Issey Miyake (until his death in 2022) and four other Japanese designers, and operated by The Miyake Issey Foundation.

== Recognition ==
=== Exhibitions ===
Many of Miyake's designs are in museums, including the Museum of Modern Art's permanent collection. From March 2016, the largest retrospective of his work was organized at The National Art Center, Tokyo, celebrating 45 years of career.

=== Honours ===
- 2005 – Praemium Imperiale (for Sculpture)
- 2006 – Kyoto Prize
- 2010 – Order of Culture (Japan)
- 2014 – XXIII Premio Compasso d'Oro ADI (for family of lamps IN-EI Issey Miyake, Artemide)
- 2016 – Legion of Honour (France)
