= 21 21 Design Sight =

Design museum in Tokyo

Coordinates: 35°40′03″N 139°43′48″E

21_21 Design Sight
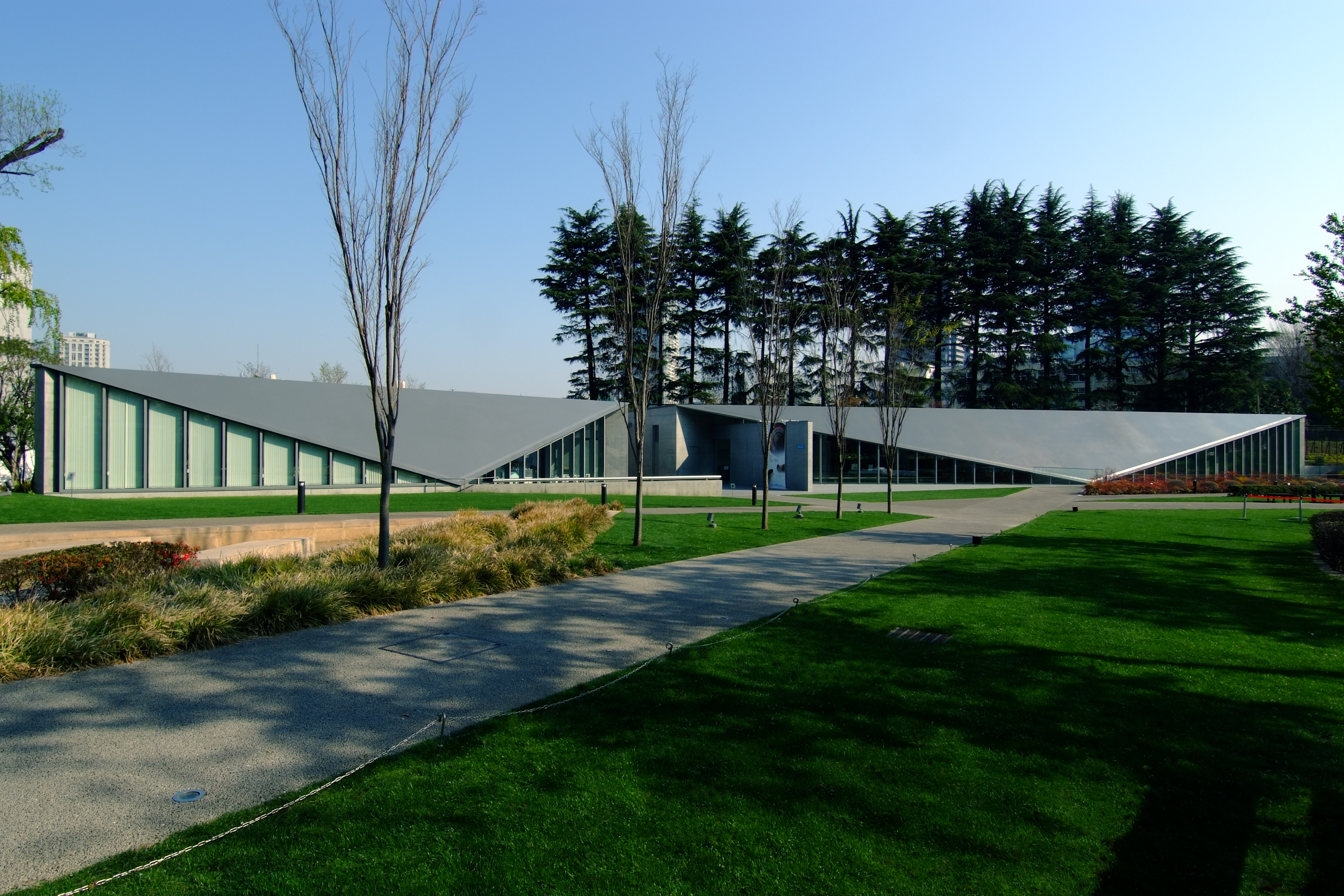
- Established: March 30, 2007
- Location: Tokyo, Japan
- Directors: Naoto Fukasawa; Issey Miyake; Taku Satoh
- Website: 2121designsight.jp/en/

21_21 Design Sight is a museum in Roppongi in Minato, Tokyo, Japan, which opened in 2007. The museum, a design museum, was created by architect Tadao Ando and fashion designer Issey Miyake. "The idea was to create not only a museum that shows exhibits," says Ando, "but also a place for researching the potentiality of design as an element that enriches our daily life, a place that fosters the public's interest in design by arousing in them different sights and perspectives on how we can view the world and the objects surrounding us." The building, designed by Ando, is on the edge of the park area, and features 1,700 square meters (18,300 sq ft) of floor space, including two galleries and an attached cafe run by chef and restaurateur Takamasa Uetake. The split-level concrete structure includes a hand-sanded steel roof (whose design was inspired by Issey Miyake's A-POC ("A Piece of Cloth") concept) and 14-meter (46 ft) long glass panels.

The current directors, after the death of Miyake are Japanese designers Taku Satoh, and Naoto Fukasawa, while Noriko Kawakami serves as an associate director .

== Gallery ==
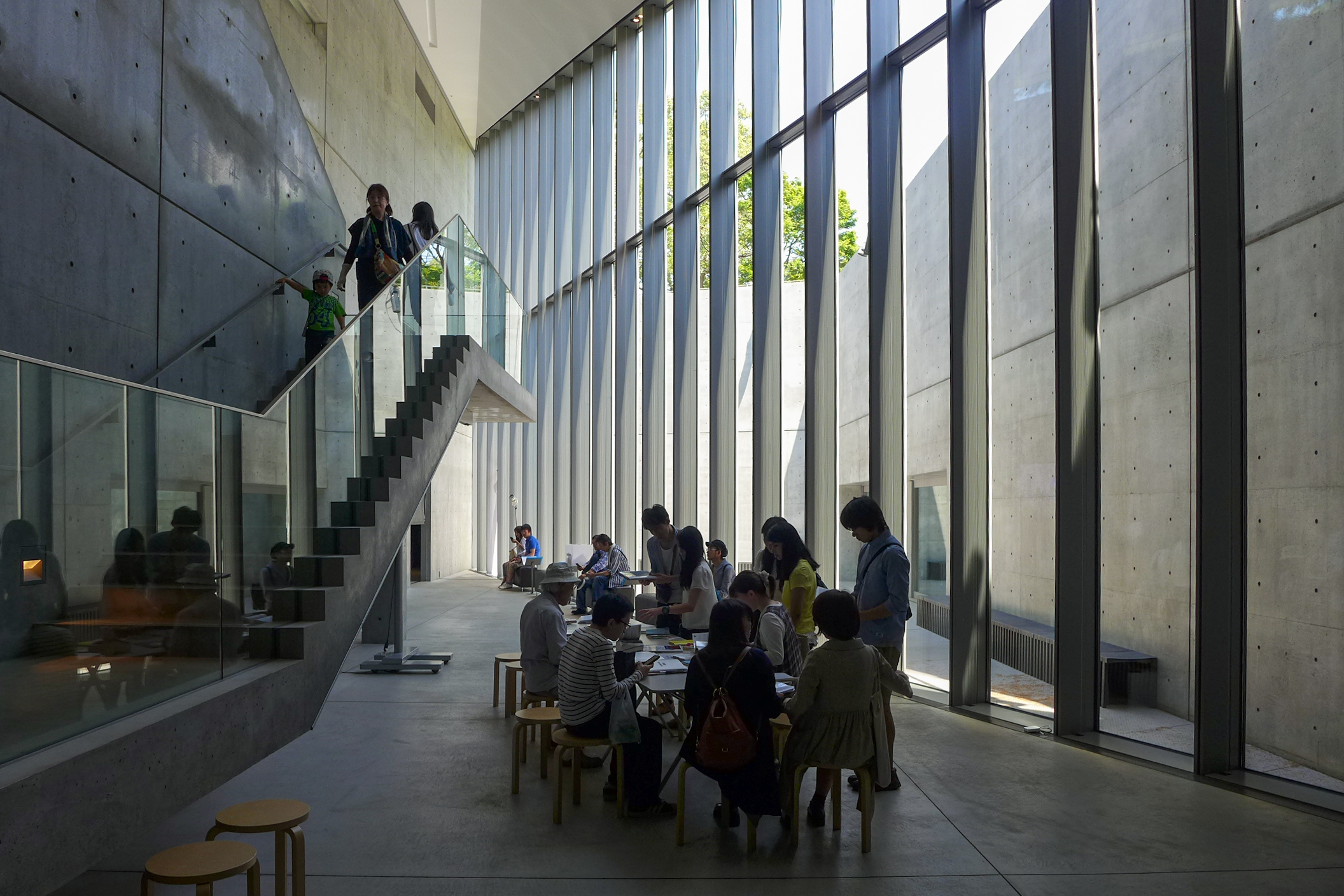
Interior

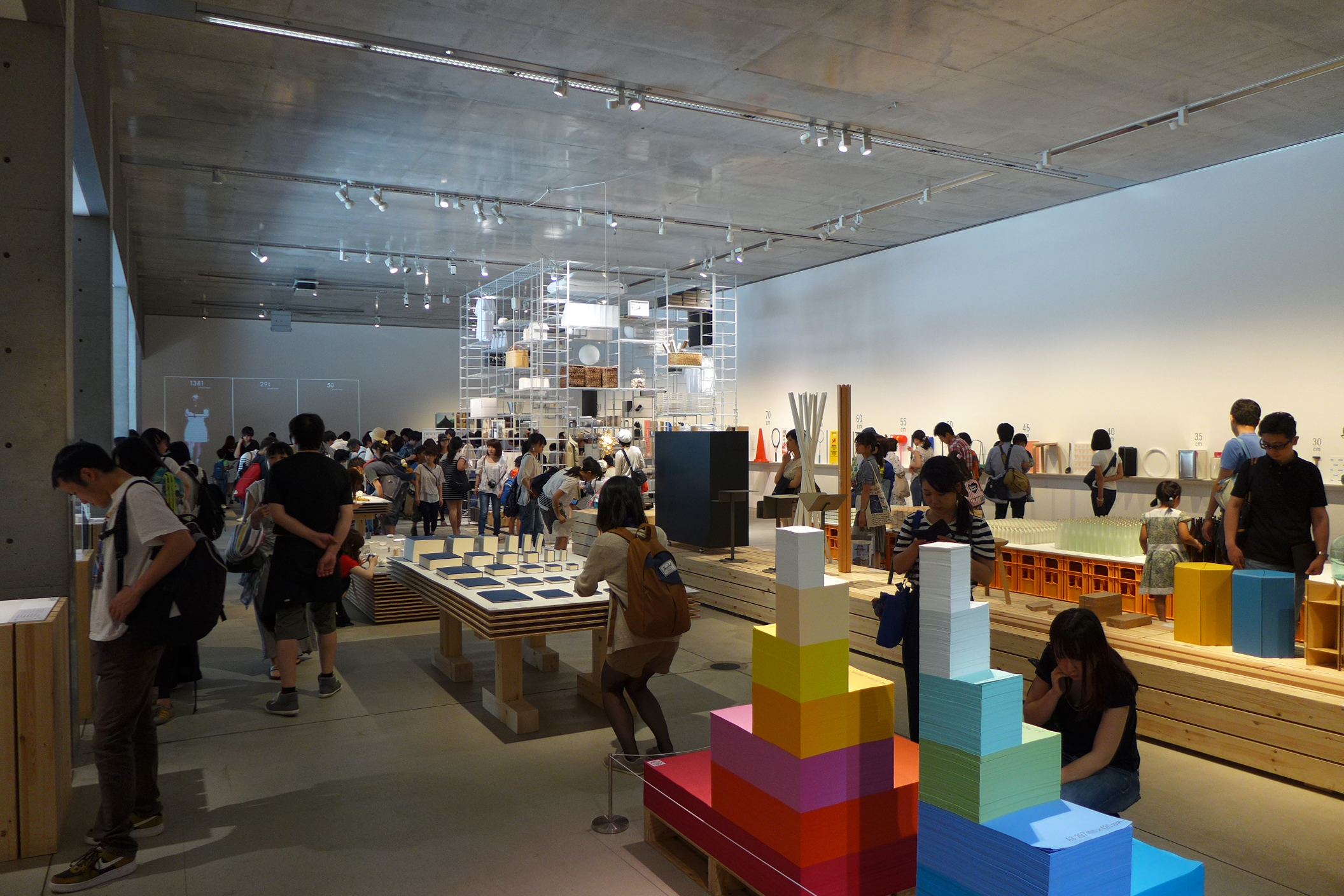
Gallery in basement

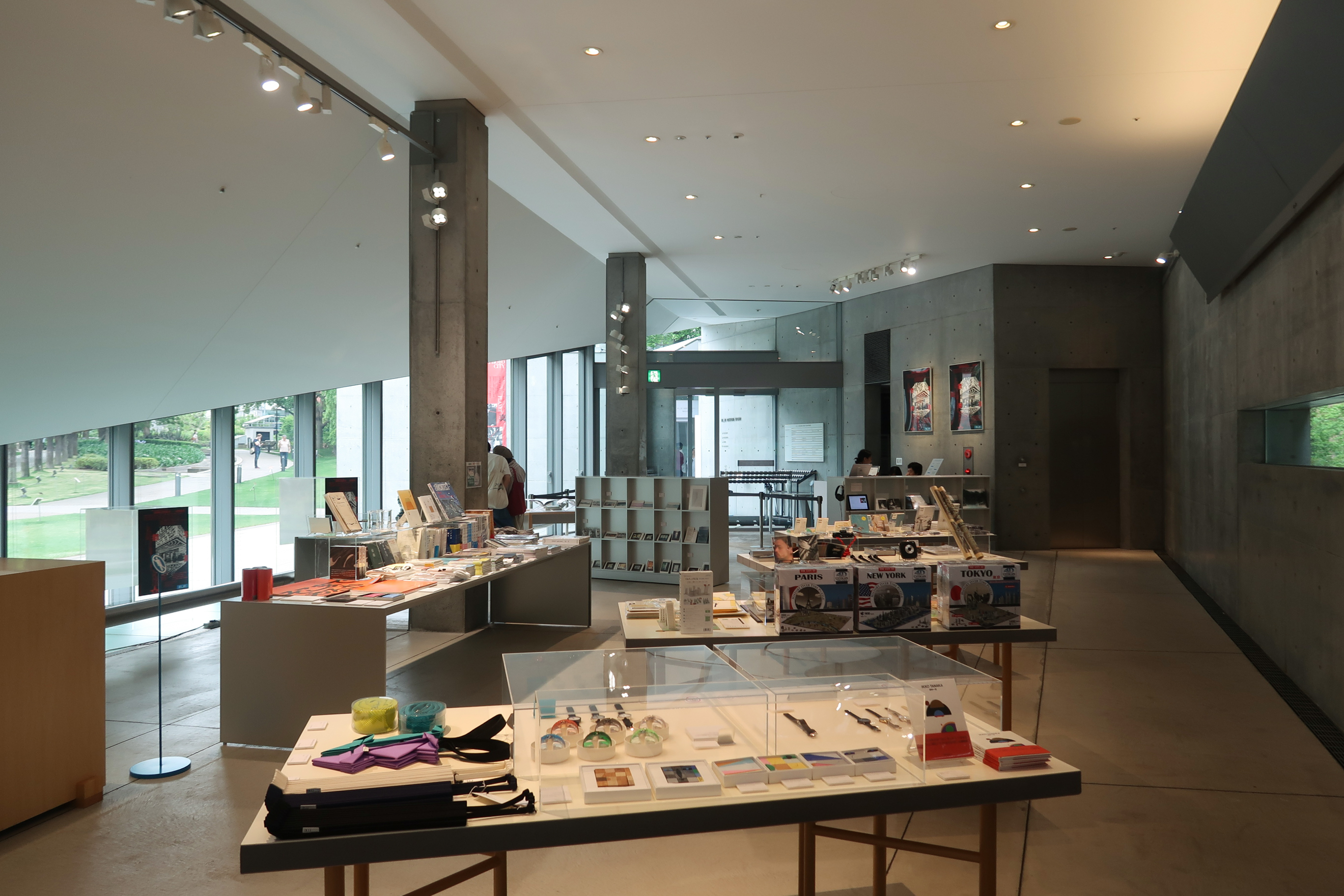
Gift shop on ground floor

== See also ==
- List of design museums
