= 1951 in art =

Events from the year 1951 in art.

== Events ==
- April – The Peggy Guggenheim Collection at the Palazzo Venier dei Leoni in Venice is first opened to the public.
- May 3–September 30 – Festival of Britain, based on London's South Bank. Director Hugh Casson has assembled a team of young designers and architects to create it.
  - Festival Star emblem by Abram Games.
  - Royal Festival Hall by Leslie Martin, Peter Moro and Robert Matthew.
  - Dome of Discovery by Ralph Tubbs.
  - Skylon by Philip Powell, Hidalgo Moya and Felix Samuely.
  - Riverside Restaurant, New Schools building and Waterloo entrance tower by Jane Drew with Maxwell Fry.
  - Sculptures: Youth Advancing by Jacob Epstein; Reclining Figure: Festival by Henry Moore; Contrapunctal Forms and Turning Forms by Barbara Hepworth; The Islanders by Siegfried Charoux; The Sunbathers by Peter Laszlo Peri; The Industries, Heavy Light and Electricity by Karel Vogel; Four Seasons Group (reliefs) by F. E. McWilliam; and a fountain by Eduardo Paolozzi.
  - Murals by Mary Fedden, Josef Herman and John Tunnard.
  - Furnishing fabrics and wallpapers by Lucienne Day, notably her screen-printed fabric Calyx.
  - The Arts Council of Great Britain has also commissioned work from Robert Adams, Reg Butler, Lynn Chadwick, Frank Dobson, Karin Jonzen, F. E. McWilliam, Bernard Meadows, Uli Nimptsch and Eduardo Paolozzi. Some is sited in the concurrent open-air exhibition of sculpture in Battersea Park and there is an associated exhibition Sixty Paintings for '51 at the RBA Galleries and a show of popular and traditional art, Black Eyes & Lemonade, organised by Barbara Jones at the Whitechapel Gallery.
- May 21 – The 9th Street Art Exhibition, otherwise known as the Ninth Street Show, a gathering of a number of notable artists, marks the stepping-out of the postwar New York avant-garde, collectively known as the New York School.
- September 2 – Unveiling of 'restored' medieval frescoes in the war-damaged St. Mary's Church, Lübeck; in 1952, Lothar Malskat reveals that most were forged by him.
- October 9 – American photographer Alice Austen is guest of honor at the first Alice Austen Day on Staten Island following the recent 'rediscovery' of her work.
- Henri Matisse completes interior decoration of Chapelle du Rosaire de Vence.

== Exhibitions ==
- May 2–July 29 – Sculpture and Drawings by Henry Moore retrospective exhibition at the Tate Gallery, London.
- May 21–June 10 – 9th Street Art Exhibition (otherwise known as the Ninth Street Show), stepping-out of the post war New York avant-garde, collectively known as the New York School.

== Awards ==
- Archibald Prize: Ivor Hele – Laurie Thomas
- Sculptor Henry Moore refuses the offer of a knighthood.

== Works ==
- Leonora Carrington - La Grande Dame (sculpture)
- Salvador Dalí
  - Christ of Saint John of the Cross
  - A Logician Devil (woodcut)
- M. C. Escher – lithographs
  - Curl-up
  - House of Stairs
- James Earle Fraser – The Arts of Peace: Music and Harvest and Aspiration and Literature
- Lucian Freud
  - Girl With a White Dog
  - Interior in Paddington
- Leo Friedlander – The Arts of War: Valor and Sacrifice
- Alfred Janes – Portrait of William Grant Murray
- Ellsworth Kelly - Colors for a Large Wall
- Louis le Brocquy – A Family
- Barnett Newman – Vir Heroicus Sublimis
- Pablo Picasso – Massacre in Korea
- Robert Rauschenberg – White Paintings
- Clyfford Still – Painting
- James Buchanan "Buck" Winn – The History of Ranching (mural for Pearl Brewing Company, San Antonio, Texas)
- Andrew Wyeth – Trodden Weed

== Publications ==
- Memoirs of Thomas Jones, Penkerrig, Radnorshire, 1803 is published by the Walpole Society.

== Births ==
- January 2 – Alexander Pogrebinsky, Ukrainian-American painter and educator
- February 4 – Wolfgang Beltracchi, born Fischer, German art forger
- February 19 - Jerry Saltz, American art critic
- April 16
  - Richard Spare, English artist and printmaker
  - Pierre Toutain-Dorbec, French graphic artist and sculptor
- May 12 – Rosalind Savill, English art historian and curator (died 2024)
- May 19 – Katalin Rényi, Hungarian painter and graphic designer (died 2023)
- June 2 – Gilbert Baker, American artist (died 2017)
- June 22 – Humphrey Ocean, born Butler-Bowdon, English painter
- September 11 – Lex Drewinski, Polish poster artist
- November 17 – Jack Vettriano, Scottish painter (died 2025)
- date unknown
  - Vanley Burke, Jamaican-British photographer and artist
  - John Kindness, Northern Irish multi-media artist
  - Robert Koenig, English wood sculptor
  - Thomas Lawson, Scottish artist and writer
  - Deborah Luster, American photographer
  - Qu Leilei, Chinese painter
  - Tanis S'eiltin, Tlingit artist
  - Susan Swartz, American painter

== Deaths ==
- February 6 – Frank DuMond, American painter, illustrator and teacher (b. 1865)
- February 18 – Miloš Slovák, Czech painter (b. 1885)
- February 21 – Katarzyna Kobro, Polish sculptor (b. 1898)
- April 23 – Charles Keck, American sculptor (b. 1875)
- May 11 – Wilfrid de Glehn, English painter (b. 1871)
- June 21 – Mary Tannahill, American painter and artist in fabrics (b. 1863)
- August 10 – Tony Gaudio, Italian-born cinematographer (b. 1883)
- September 1 – Wols, German-born abstract painter and photographer (b. 1913)
- September 5 – Mário Eloy, Portuguese Expressionist painter (b. 1900)
- September 13 – Arthur Szyk, Polish-born illustrator and political artist (b. 1894)
- September 18 – Gelett Burgess, American art critic (b. 1866)
- September 26 – Lena Himmelstein, American dress designer (b. 1877)
- October 1 – Karel Teige, Czech graphic artist (b. 1900)
- November 2 – Ernest Ludvig Ipsen, American portrait painter (b. 1869)
- November 15 – Frank Weston Benson, American Impressionist painter (b. 1862)
- c. December 25 – Frank Newbould, English poster artist (b. 1887)
- Undated – Louis Legrand, French aquatint engraver (b. 1863)

== See also ==
- 1951 in fine arts of the Soviet Union
