= Stations of the Cross (disambiguation) =

The Stations of the Cross are a series of images depicting Jesus Christ on the day of his crucifixion.

Stations of the Cross may also refer to:

- Stations of the Cross (album), a 1987 album by Johnny Thunders
- Stations of the Cross (film), a 2014 German film
- The Station of the Cross, a radio network
- The Stations of the Cross (Newman), a series of paintings by Barnett Newman
