= Peter Peri =

British artist

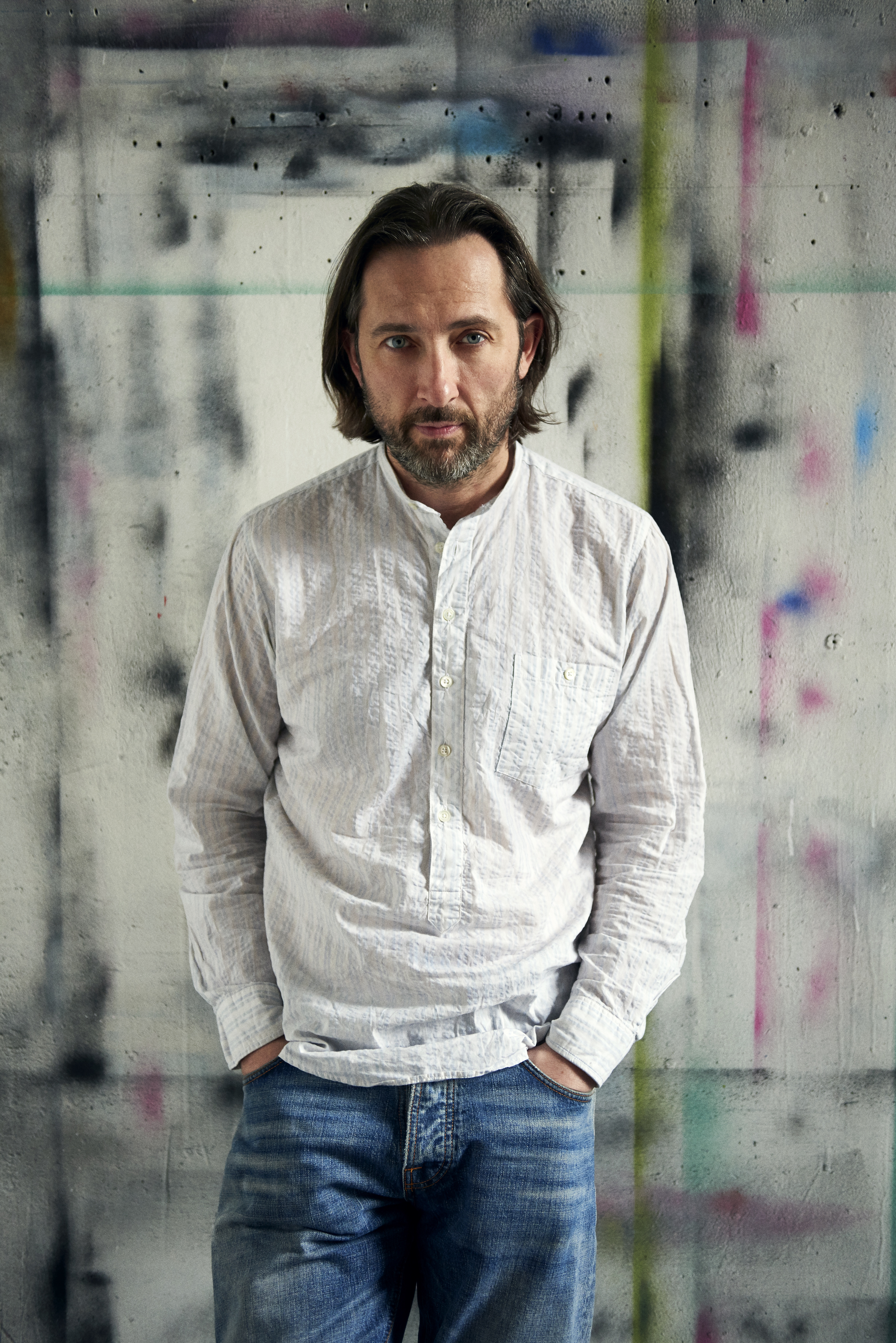
- Born: London
- Education: Chelsea College of Art MA
- Known for: painting, drawing

Peter Peri is a British artist known for his work in painting and drawing. He lives and works in London, where he was born.

Peri studied at Chelsea College of Art, London, graduating from the MA programme in 2003. He made his debut in 2003 at Bloomberg New Contemporaries. He has also shown at Art Now at Tate Britain in April 2007, the Kunsthalle Basel, Switzerland in September 2006 and his work was shown at Tate Britain's Classified and the Arts Council Collection's How to Improve the World: 60 Years of British Art at the Hayward Gallery, London.

Peri's work has a personal connection to Modernism. His grandfather was Laszlo Péri (1899–1967), a Hungarian émigré to Britain who was involved in Constructivism before turning to architecture and later in his life to Realism. After 1945 his grandfather adopted the name "Peter Peri" also.

== Collections ==
His work is in included in the collections of the Tate, Victoria and Albert Museum, the Saatchi Gallery, the Arts Council of Great Britain Collection in Britain, Kunsthalle Basel in Switzerland and the Museum of Fine Arts in Budapest.
