= Miloš Slovák =

Czech painter and commercial artist (1885–1951)

Miloš Slovák (April 12, 1885, Brno – February 18, 1951, Prague) was a Czechoslovak painter and commercial artist.

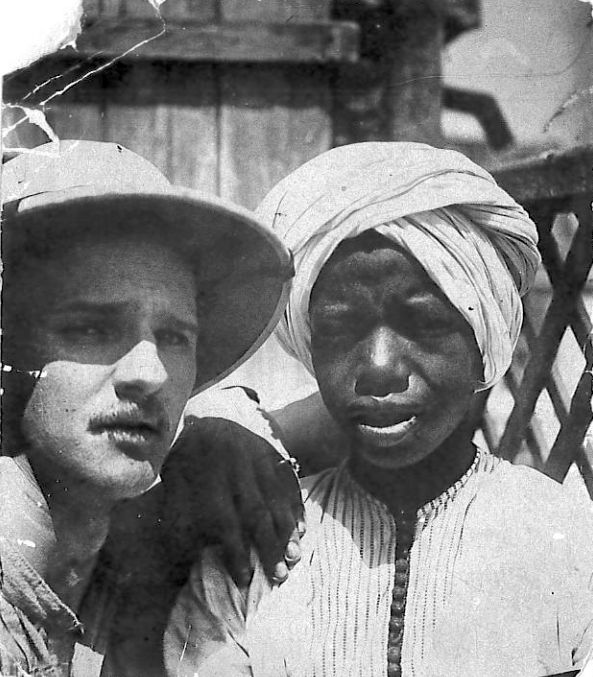
Slovák and his valet

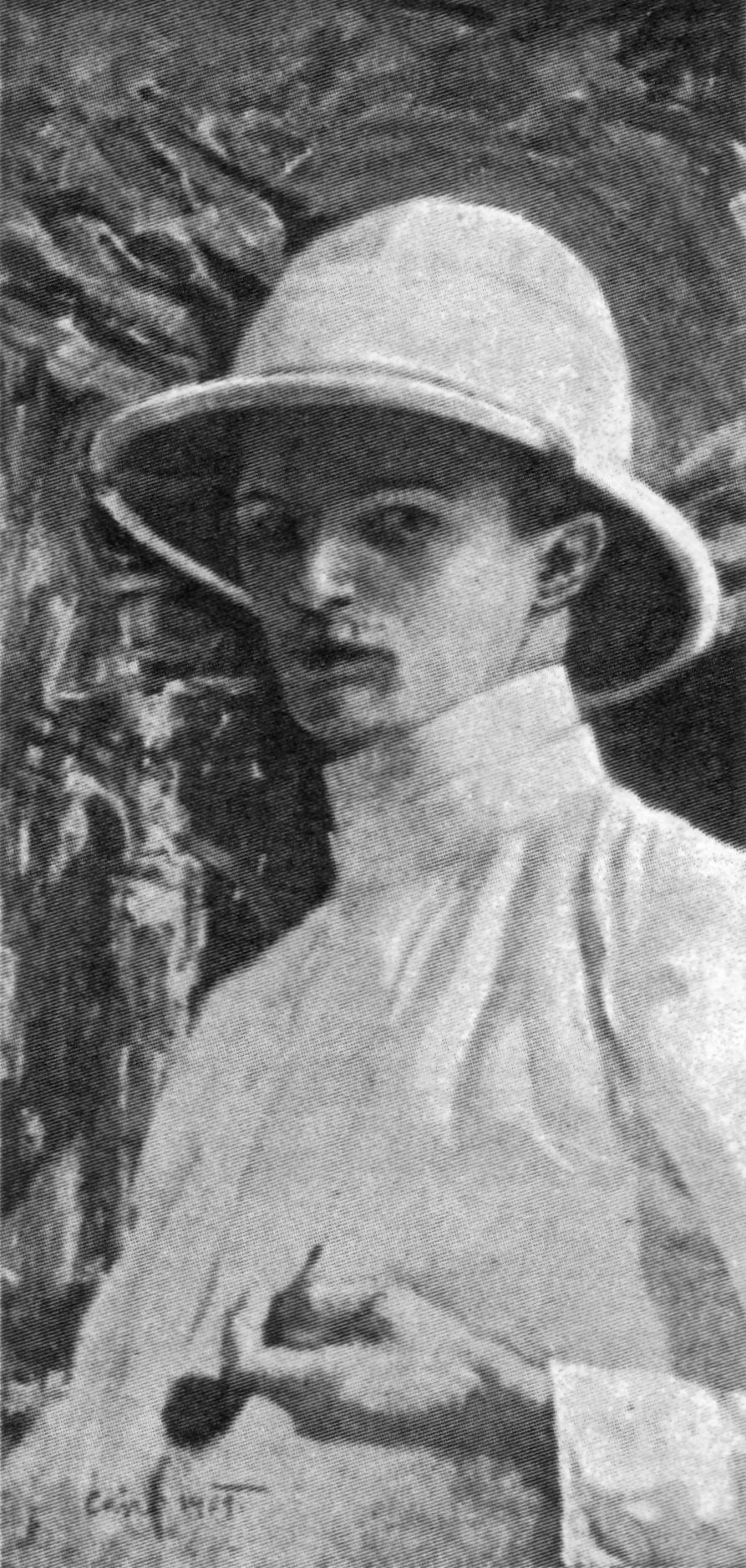
Miloš Slovák, The self-portrait 1909

== Life ==
He born in Brno in a family hotel director. In his youth he lived with his uncle in Kroměříž, who worked as printing worker for Henry Slovak (who was trained in the Moravian share a printer in Brno). From 1901 to 1902 he painted several motifs of Kroměříž region that Uncle reproduced on postcards. Slovak graduated from the Academy of Arts Architecture and Design in Prague and after graduation he studied painting with Professor Vojtěch Hynais at the Academy of Fine Arts in Prague. In 1908 he received funds the Lerch Foundation for ways artists to Rome (foundation founded by Czech painter Lev Lerch) means to study in Italy and in Cairo. He led other trips abroad to southern Europe, he stayed in Corsica, North Africa, Morocco and Tunisia. He also lived in the Slovak Republic. Before World War he went to America, where he lived until 1922. There he gained valuable experience in modern business advertising, e.g. for Bordens Milk Malt, Gordon Hosiery and more. He returned to Czechoslovakia as a successful graphic designer with a big bundle of cash and shares of US electric companies that he traded for shares of Mining and Metallurgical Company. For the director of the company he worked his life partner Helena Třísková. In Prague, he lived on the Rieger Waterfront 32, now Masaryk Waterfront.

== Work ==
Financially independent, he painted pictures for pleasure and made additional money by creating advertising posters in business and film. He won the prestigious position of graphic designer at the Bata company for a monthly fee of CZK 5,000. He is the author of many proposals of lithographic posters. He also worked for the Prague company Fr. Schnöbling, which produced Sypsi baby powder, dental hygiene BIS Acidentol and especially famous toothpaste Thymolin. The name is derived from thyme, having anti-inflammatory and antiseptic properties. Toothpaste used and promoted the First Republic Czechoslovak Army. He is the author of the poster, which is famous for saying "Thymolin Smile." The graphic did not sign his work, but occasionally he included his initials. He was a member of Creative Artists in Prague. After the Communist regime his works were exhibited only one joint exhibition. The first solo exhibition of Miloš Slovák business poster lithograph works organized Gallery in Prague Lucerna in April and May 2016, with all posters provided by Agentura ProVás.

== Gallery ==
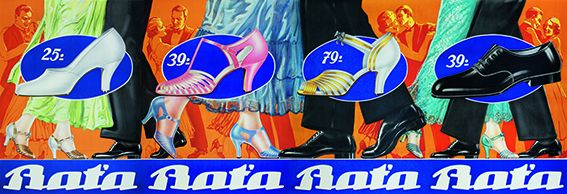

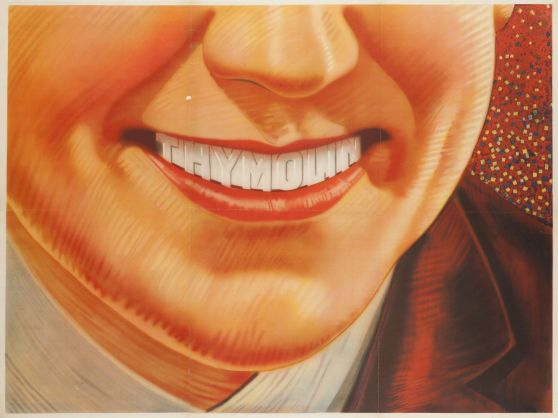
Thymolin Smile (126x95cm)

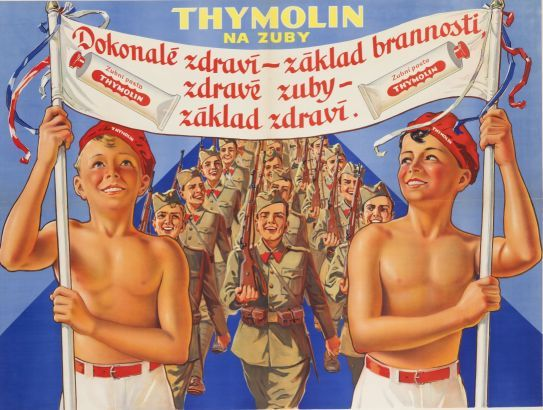
Thymolin Army (127x96cm)

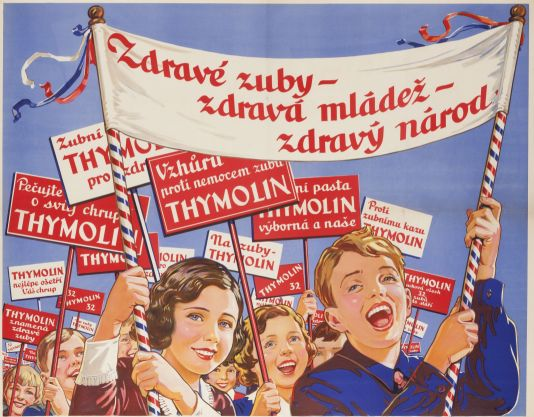
Thymolin Youth (113x90cm)

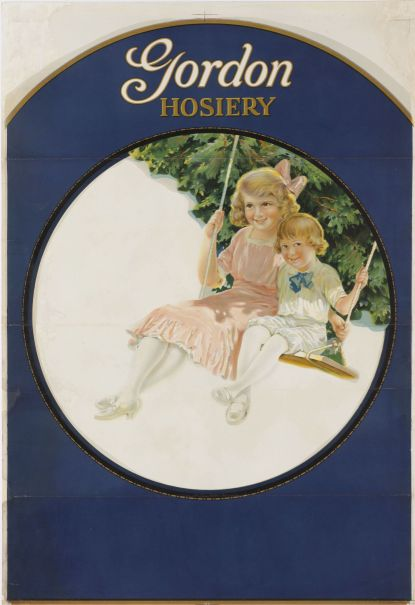
Gordon Hosiery (73x107cm)

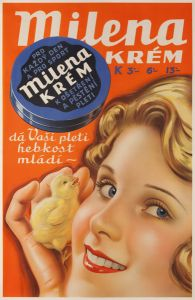
Milena Make-up (64x96cm)

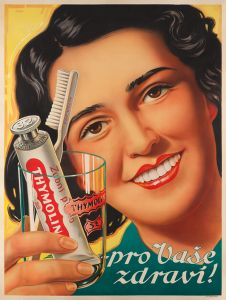
Thymolin for Health (127x189cm)
