= Vir Heroicus Sublimis =

Painting by Barnett Newman

- Vir Heroicus Sublimis at the Museum of Modern Art in New York City
- Artist: Barnett Newman
- Year: 1950–1951
- Catalogue: 79250
- Medium: Oil on canvas
- Dimensions: 242.3 cm × 541.7 cm (95 3/8 in × 213 1/4 in)
- Location: Museum of Modern Art, New York
- Accession: 240.1969

Vir Heroicus Sublimis is a 1951 painting by Barnett Newman, an American painter who was a key part of the abstract expressionist movement. Vir Heroicus Sublimis—"Man, Heroic and Sublime" in Latin—attempts to evoke a reaction from its viewers through its overwhelming scale (his largest canvas yet at the time he released it) and saturated color. The painting is part of the permanent collection of the Museum of Modern Art in New York City.

== Newman and chromatic abstraction ==
Newman falls under the subset of chromatic abstraction, along with, most notably, Mark Rothko, which means that he uses color as the primary vehicle of expression, as opposed to the emphasis on the artistic process that was indicative of gestural abstraction. Chromatic abstraction led to the development of color field painting over the next couple decades. In both color field painting and chromatic abstraction, "color is freed from objective context and becomes the subject in itself."

Newman’s works are frequently referred to as deceptively simple, due to their lack of tangible subject and the fact that each canvas consists of only one or two colors. Working off Jung’s idea of the collective unconscious that played a major role in developing the ideology of abstract expressionism, Newman’s painting specifically sought to take one color (in the case of Vir Heroicus Sublimis, red) and remove it from its context, therefore encouraging viewers to react to the color according to their instincts, completely separated from its societal connotations.

Like most abstract expressionists, Newman worked with large-scale canvasses in an attempt to make a large impact on viewers. Art historian Beth Harris said the painting produces in the viewer a feeling of being drawn and overcome by it. Vir Heroicus Sublimis was his largest attempt yet at the time he released it, at 7 ft 11 3/8 in (2.423 m) tall by 17 ft 9 1/4 in (5.417 m) wide. Like his other works, Vir Heroicus Sublimis consists of a single, slightly modulated color field separated by vertical, narrow bands called "zips". Newman explained that the function of the zips was to give the work scale and serve as a contrast to the massive color field; however, they were not to be viewed as separate entities. "The streak was always going through the atmosphere; I kept trying to create a world around it", he said.

== Interpretation ==
Newman’s paintings have elicited many different interpretations and reactions from various art critics and viewers: "They have sometimes been regarded as philosophic statements made without artistic skill, or conversely, as pure painting devoid of a subject." Despite their simplistic composition, Newman places emphasis on the weighty meaning of his works, as evidenced by the titles he chooses for his works. Rather than titling them by number, as Pollock and Rothko did, Newman gives his works specific titles that hint at their intended meanings. For example, his work Adam, 1951–52, has been likened to the Book of Genesis, and the thin bands of paint or "zips" in that work have been interpreted as references to the concept that God and man exist as a single beam of light.

Vir Heroicus Sublimis has been interpreted in a variety of ways. Many critics, when discussing Newman, refer to his attempt to capture both the tangible and intangible, "spirit and matter", and Vir Heroicus, with its particularly large scale, as the epitome of that struggle. Newman himself compared seeing his painting for the first time to meeting a new person: "It's no different, really, from meeting another person. One has a reaction to the person physically. Also, there's a metaphysical thing, and if a meeting of people is meaningful, it affects both their lives." Viewers feel as if they are in the presence of something monumental when they see Vir Heroicus, but Newman wanted viewers to see more than that: he wanted to convey his feelings about the tragic human condition.
