= Black Fire I =

Painting by Barnett Newman

- Artist: Barnett Newman
- Year: 1961
- Medium: oil on canvas
- Dimensions: 289.5 cm × 213.3 cm (114 in × 84 in); 2
- Location: Private collection

Black Fire I is a 1961 oil on canvas abstract expressionist painting by Barnett Newman, completed in 1961.

== Background ==
Black Fire I was sold to a private collector for $84.2 million ($84,165,000) on May 13, 2014, at Rockefeller Plaza in New York City, after a telephone bidding war, exceeding the estimations of $50 million made by the organizing house, Christie’s.

== See also ==
- List of most expensive paintings
