= Who's Afraid of Red, Yellow and Blue =

Series of four paintings by Barnett Newman

Digital recreation of Who’s Afraid of Red, Yellow and Blue I

Who's Afraid of Red, Yellow and Blue is a series of four large-scale paintings by Barnett Newman painted between 1966 and 1970. Two of them have been the subject of vandalistic attacks in museums. The series' name was a reference to Who's Afraid of Virginia Woolf?, the 1962 play by Edward Albee, which was in itself a reference to "Who's Afraid of the Big Bad Wolf?", the 1933 song immortalized in Disney cartoons.

Barnett Newman started the first painting in the series without a preconceived notion of the subject or end result; he only wanted it to be different from what he had done until then, and to be asymmetrical. But after having painted the canvas red, he was confronted with the fact that only the other primary colours yellow and blue would work with it; this led to an inherent confrontation with the works of De Stijl and especially Piet Mondriaan, who had in the opinion of Newman turned the combination of the three colors into a didactic idea instead of a means of expression in freedom.

== Who's Afraid of Red, Yellow and Blue I ==
This 1966 oil on canvas measures 190 by 122 cm, making it the smallest of the four. It was dedicated to Jasper Johns. It was the subject of a 2006 installation by Robert Irwin at the Pace Gallery, and also the centerpiece of the 2007 exhibition Who's afraid of red, yellow and blue?: Positionen der Farbfeldmalerei in the Staatliche Kunsthalle Baden-Baden. It is held in a private collection.

== Who's Afraid of Red, Yellow and Blue II ==
Digital recreation of Who’s Afraid of Red, Yellow and Blue II

This 1967 acrylic on canvas painting is part of the collection of the Staatsgalerie Stuttgart. It measures approximately 305 x 259 cm.

== Who's Afraid of Red, Yellow and Blue III ==
Digital recreation of Who’s Afraid of Red, Yellow and Blue III

Measuring 224 by 544 cm, this 1967 painting is part of the collection of the Stedelijk Museum in Amsterdam. It was attacked with a knife by Gerard Jan van Bladeren in 1986 and restored by Daniel Goldreyer in 1991. The restoration initially cost some $400,000, but was heavily attacked by critics who claimed that subtle nuances in the three monochrome sections had been lost and that Goldreyer had used house paints and a roller. According to critics, the painting had been destroyed twice: first during the attack, and again during the restoration. Goldreyer filed a $125 million suit against the City of Amsterdam and the Museum, claiming that his reputation was damaged.

After lawsuits, settlements, and further restoration, the final cost of the attack was estimated to be close to $1 million. The Amsterdam city council asked for a full forensic report on the controversial restoration. When the report was finished, the City of Amsterdam and Goldreyer agreed to keep it under wraps, as part of a settlement. But almost 20 years later, on 11 September 2013, the Raad van State decided the report had to be made public by the Government of Amsterdam within six weeks. A week later the Volkskrant newspaper published the report's main conclusions. It confirmed that Goldreyer had indeed repainted the entire red section with acrylic paint and had used a roller to add two layers of varnish to the (initially unvarnished) painting. According to the newspaper, Goldreyer's restoration has "forever destroyed" Newman's work. The painting was put on display again in the Stedelijk Museum in 2014.

Wim Beeren, director of the Stedelijk Museum at the time of the 1986 attack, revealed in an interview that van Bladeren was not pleased with the restoration and called the museum to warn his successor Rudi Fuchs of a second attack. Van Bladeren entered the museum for a second time in 1997 to make good on his intentions to deface Who's Afraid of Red, Yellow and Blue III but was not able to locate the painting. He instead opted to attack a different Barnett Newman painting called Cathedra, which he slashed in a similar fashion to his first attack. Beeren recalled that the painting, not on display at the time, was in a storage facility.

== Who's Afraid of Red, Yellow and Blue IV ==
Digital recreation of Who’s Afraid of Red, Yellow and Blue IV

Who's Afraid of Red, Yellow and Blue IV was created in 1969–1970 and is the last major work by Barnett Newman. The oil on canvas painting measures 274 by 603 cm. It belongs to the collection of the Nationalgalerie in Berlin, who bought it in 1982 from Newman's widow for 2.7 million Deutschmark (roughly 1 million US dollars), partially with funds raised by the public. It was attacked on April 13, 1982, days before it would be presented to the public, by Josef Nikolaus Kleer, a 29-year-old student who claimed that the picture was a "perversion of the German flag" (the painting has vertical bands of red, yellow and blue, while the German flag has horizontal stripes in black, red and yellow), and that his actions completed the work, a reference to the title of the painting. The restoration took two years.

== Legacy ==
The Who's Afraid of series has reached an iconic status in the world of modern and contemporary art, and has been the inspiration for many artworks and exhibitions.

- Brice Marden created a number of works in red, yellow and blue in the early 1970s, influenced by Mondrian and by these paintings by Newman
- In 2006, Robert Irwin installation at the Museum of Contemporary Art San Diego
- Kerry James Marshall's 2012 exhibition "Who’s Afraid of Red, Black and Green" directly references Newman's works.
- In 2012, La Maison Rouge organised an exhibition of neon art, titled Neon, Who’s afraid of red, yellow and blue ?
- A 2018 documentary, The End of Fear, detailed the restoration attempts and attack on Who's Afraid of Red, Yellow and Blue III. The painting was "reproduced" with a white canvas (the actual reproduction proved impossible, given that the artist was not Newman and the painting was lost forever- it could not be reproduced).
- 99% Invisible, a podcast by Roman Mars that reports on the unseen and overlooked aspects of design, architecture, and activity in the world, detailed the first attack, restoration attempts, and attempted second attack on Who's Afraid of Red, Yellow and Blue III in a 2019 episode titled The Many Deaths of a Painting.
- Philip Taaffe's 1985 We Are Not Afraid is openly acknowledged as a reply and tribute to Newman's paintings, especially Who's Afraid of Red, Yellow and Blue II, matching the basic layout and even the dimensions
- Jacob Geller's essay "Who's Afraid of Modern Art" uses the vandalism of Red, Yellow and Blue III as a framing device to discuss attacks on other non-traditional artists like Mapplethorpe, Rothko, or Serrano, ultimately identifying the attacks with the Nazi concept of Degenerate Art and the Gamergate harassment campaign against Depression Quest.
