= Mário Eloy =

Portuguese painter (1900–1951)

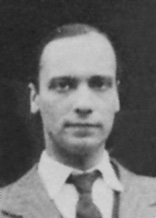
Mário Eloy

Mário Eloy (15 March 1900 in Algés – 5 September 1951 in Lisbon) was a Portuguese expressionist painter.

Eloy was born in Lisbon. His style shows the influence of painters like van Gogh, Picasso and, mostly, from the German expressionist painting, that he admired during his staying in Germany, from 1927 to 1932, especially Karl Hofer.

After returning to Portugal, he became the best representative from expressionism in the Portuguese painting. Some of his latter works, like "Enterro" (c. 1940), in his references, seems to anticipate the surrealism painting in Portugal.

In year 1944, he had to leave painting due to a serious mental disease and spent the rest of his life in a mental institution at Rio de Mouro, where he died.
