= Frank Parkinson Newbould =

Frank Newbould
- Born: Frank Parkinson Newbould; 24 September 1887; Bradford, Yorkshire, England
- Died: 24 December 1951 (aged 64); London, England
- Education: Bradford College of Art; Camberwell School of Art
- Known for: Graphic design
- Spouse: Marion Jane Thomson (m. 1919)

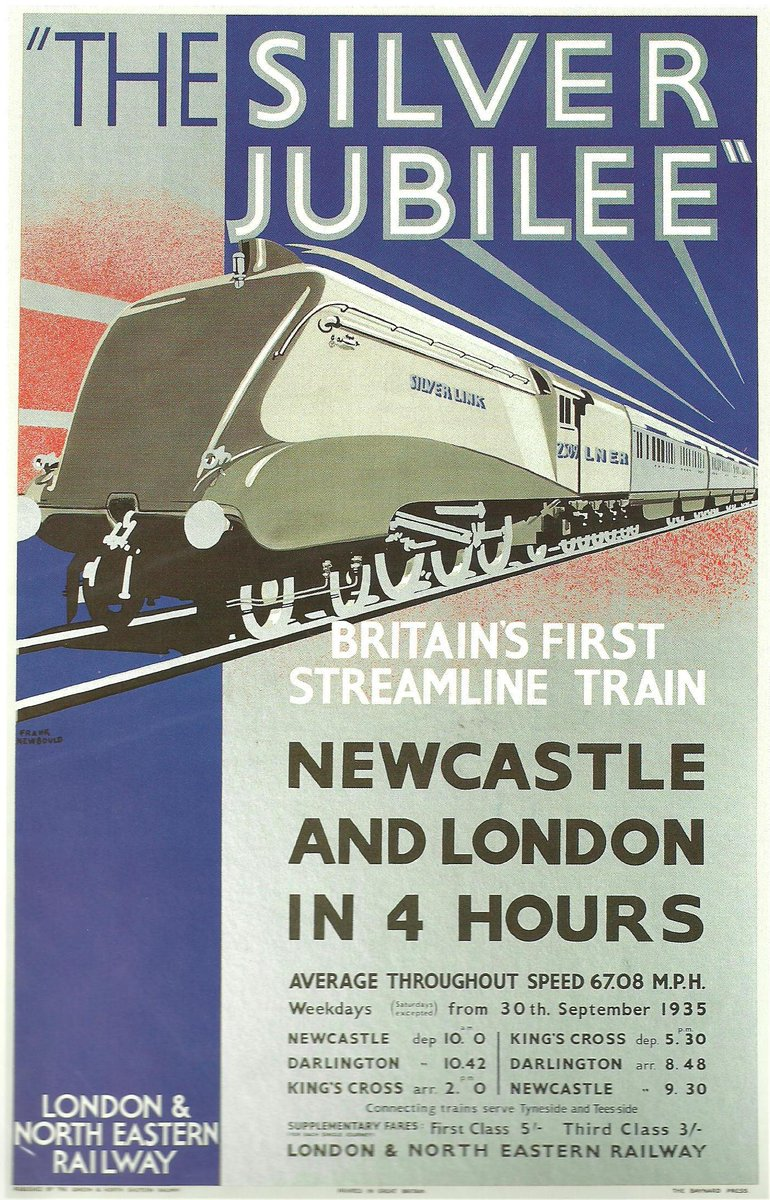
The Silver Jubilee, LNER poster, 1935

Frank Parkinson Newbould (24 September 1887 – 24 December 1951) was an English poster artist, known for his travel posters and Second World War posters for the War Office as assistant to Abram Games.

== Early life ==
He was born in Bradford, to John Newbould (1856–1944), chemist, from Pateley Bridge, and Sara Ellen, née Robinson (1856–1941), also from Bradford. He was their only child. He was educated at Bradford College of Art and Camberwell School of Art.

== Career ==
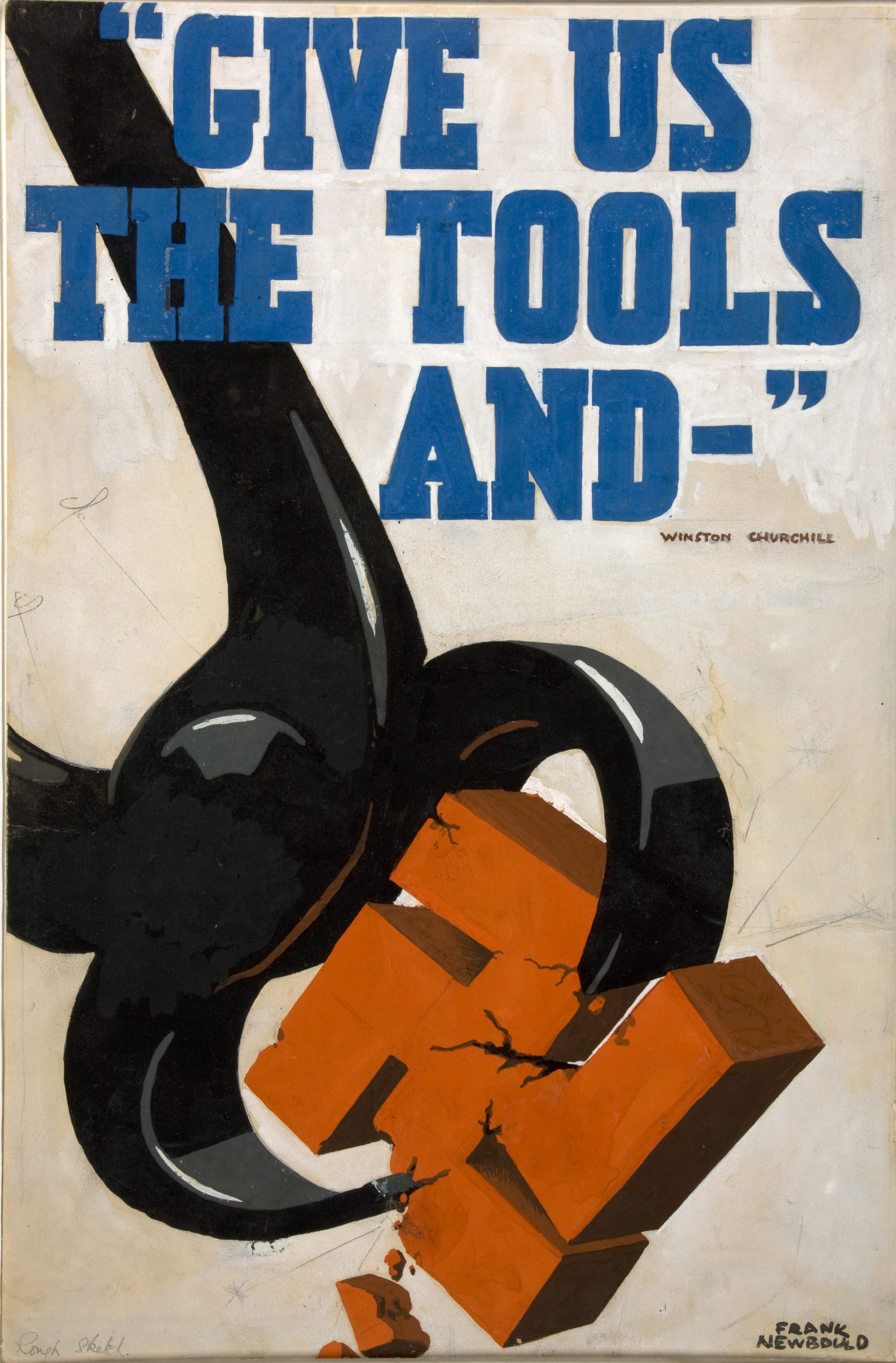
Example of Newbould's wartime work

He worked mostly in London from the interwar period specialising in travel posters. His clients included the Empire Marketing Board; London Transport and its predecessors; the London & North Eastern, Great Western and London, Midland and Scottish Railways, and the Orient and Cunard Lines.

In 1942 he joined the War Office as assistant to Abram Games, where he produced eleven posters, including a series Your Britain, Fight for it Now.

His work was characterised by bold shapes and colours.

== Personal life ==
In 1919, Newbould married Marion Jane Thomson. He died in London on 24 December 1951.
