= Peter Laszlo Peri =

Hungarian sculptor

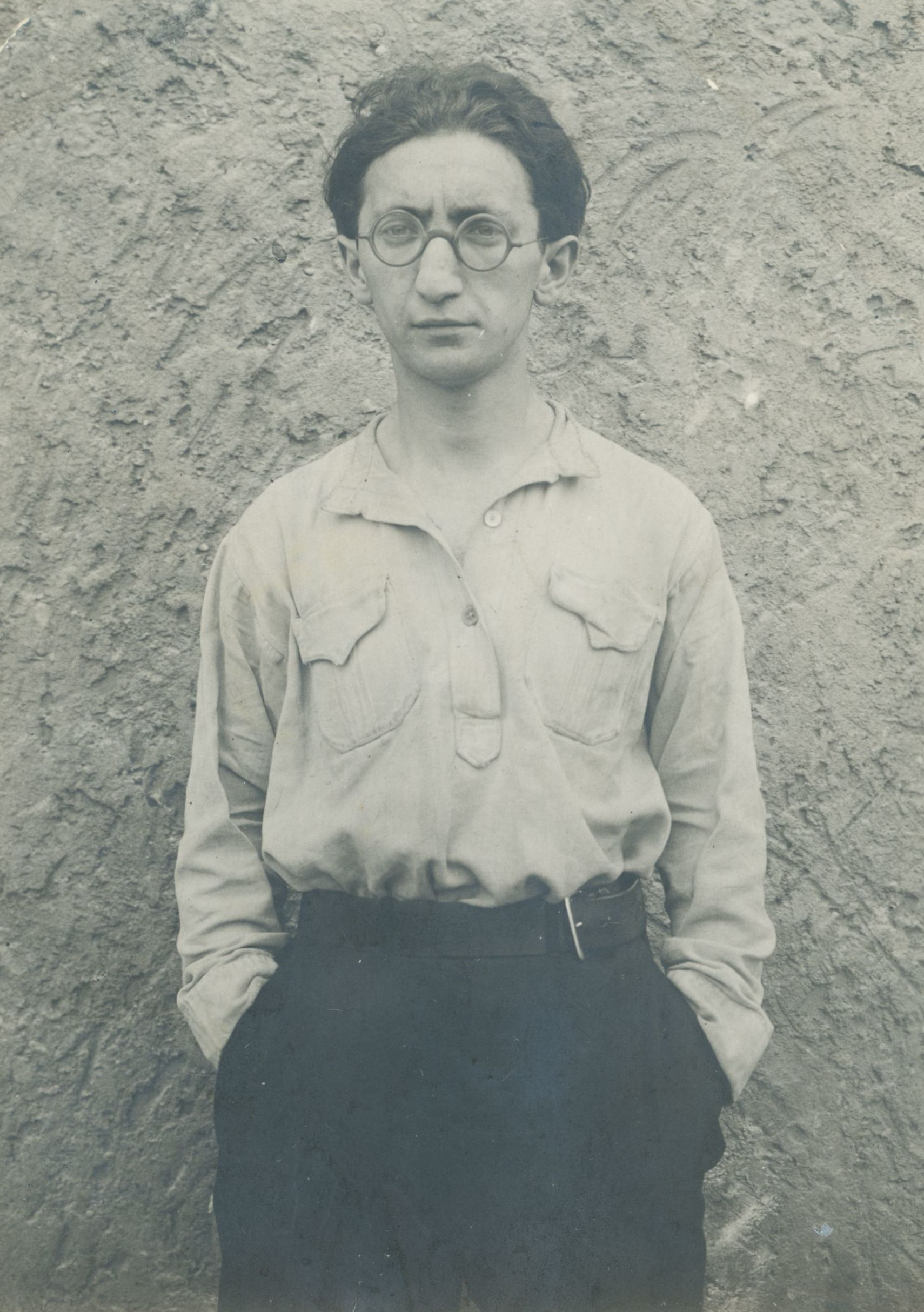
- Born: László Weisz; 13 June 1899; Budapest, Austria-Hungary
- Died: 19 January 1967 (aged 67); London, United Kingdom
- Known for: Artist and sculptor
- Notable work: Raumkonstruktion 3, collection MNAM, Centre Pompidou
- Style: Abstract geometric
- Movement: Constructivism
- Website: Official website

Peter Laszlo Peri (born László Weisz; 13 June 1899 – 19 January 1967) was a painter and sculptor.

== Name changes ==
László Weisz was born on 13 June 1899 in Budapest, Hungary. His family Magyarized their family name to "Péri". When he moved to Germany and became involved in Constructivism, he was known as Laszlo Péri. After he moved to England, he adopted the name "Peter Peri". His grandson, an artist born in 1971, also has the name Peter Peri.

== Career ==
Born in 1899, in Budapest into a large, proletarian Jewish family Peri became politicised at an early age. In 1919, he finished an apprenticeship as a bricklayer, and became a student at the workshops for proletariat fine arts in 1919. He was in contact with Lajos Kassák and the Activists. In 1917, he began his career as an actor at the MA Theater School, studying with János Mácsza. As part of a theatre company he went to Prague where he heard about the fall of the Republic of Councils. He studied architecture in 1919–20 in Budapest and Berlin. He lived for a short time in Paris in 1920, in the house of a socialist baker, before being forced to leave the country due to his political activities.

Peri moved to Vienna, then on to Berlin in 1921, where he created his first abstract geometric reliefs. In February 1922, he had the first of two joint exhibitions with László Moholy-Nagy at Der Sturm Gallery, Berlin. In 1923, his portfolio containing twelve linocuts was published by Der Sturm Verlag with accompanying text by Alfréd Kemény. His contributions to constructivism at the time were to challenge the surface of the wall by producing irregularly shaped wall reliefs and to open up new planes, anticipating the shaped canvas created after 1945; the discovery of concrete as a potential sculptural medium, colouring it if necessary, and the appreciation of the hard contour as a visual device, as seen in his collages and linoprints. These could be used to create a visual medium hovering between the relief and architecture; whereas Moholy-Nagy's Glasarchitektur achieved this using paint and canvas, Péri used less conventional media.

At the Grosse Berliner Kunstausstellung in May 1923, between the contributions of Theo van Doesburg and El Lissitzky's ‘Proun Room’ he showed his three-piece 7 m (23 ft)x17 m (56 ft) composition which, while it may also have been executed in paint on wood, had pretensions to be executed in concrete. Peri, joined the German Communist Party (KPD) in 1923. His 1924, constructivist design for a Vladimir Lenin tribute for the German art exhibition in Moscow, marked the end of his investigations into non-objective art.

That same year Peri began to work for the Berlin municipal architectural office and was there from 1924 to 1928. Probably motivated by a vision to put his productivist values into action, but frustrated he quit the job in 1928. In 1928, he signed the manifesto and statutes of the Association of Revolutionary Visual Artists of Germany (Assoziation Revolutionärer Bildener Künstler Deutschlands) (ARBKD) (ASSO) which, like other new and militant Communist art organisations, called for a reinvigoration of the idea of "proletarian culture" and suitably positive images of working-class life and culture. He was also a member of Die Abstrakten (The Abstracts) and Rote Gruppe (Red Group). In 1929, he returned to representational painting and sculpture.

Peri immigrated to England in 1933, after his wife Mary Macnaghten, granddaughter of social reformer Charles Booth, was arrested in possession of Communist propaganda. In 1934, Peri contributed "several forceful works in coloured concrete" to the Artists’ International Association (AIA) exhibition The Social Scene. He made contact with John Heartfield. In England, he lived first in Ladbroke Grove, then in Hampstead; in 1938, he moved to a studio in Camden Town where he worked until 1966. While in Hampstead, Peri joined the recently founded English section of the Artists International (later to be known as Artists International Association), an association composed largely of commercial artists and designers whose declared intention was to mobilise "the international unity of artists against Imperialist War on the Soviet Union, Fascism and Colonial oppression". In July 1938, he had a solo exhibition London Life in Concrete in an empty building at 36 Soho Square. In 1939, he became a British citizen and took the name "Peter Peri". In November 1948, he held a solo show People by Peri at the AIA Gallery. Late in the 1940s he did a series of commissions for the London County Council. His work was also part of the sculpture event in the art competition at the 1948 Summer Olympics. In 1951, Peri produced a sculptural group originally titled “Sunbathing group - Horizontal”, later known as The Sunbathers for the Festival of Britain. Commissions from Stuart Mason, Director of Education for Leicestershire included Two Children Calling A Dog, Scraptoft, c. 1956; Atom Boy, and Birstall, 1960.

When the Herbert Art Gallery & Museum opened in 1960, Peri was commissioned to "represent the life and activities of Coventry in modern terms and materials"; the work is known simply as The Coventry Sculpture.

Peri joined the Quaker faith and produced a small bronze sculpture of a Quaker Meeting, much loved by the students of Woodbrooke Study Centre, Birmingham, where it is now located.

Peter Peri died on 19 January 1967 at the age of 67.

== Major works after 1945 ==
- Source: Exhibition catalogue, 1967.
- Ministry of information
  - 1946 Displaced persons. Concrete.
- London County Council. For Lambeth
  - 1948 Children Playing.
  - 1949 Footballers.
  - 1950 Following the Leader.
- Festival of Britain
  - 1951 The Sunbathers horizontal-group.
- Leicestershire
  - 1955 Oadby Primary School. Three coloured reliefs.
  - 1956 Scraptoft South Primary School. Horizontal concrete group.
  - 1956 Scraptoft North Primary School. Folk dancing, coloured concrete relief.
  - 1956 Earl Shilton Grammar School. Three dimensional sculpture.
  - 1957 Wigston Secondary Modern School. The Living Christ.
  - 1957 Castle Donington Secondary Modern School. The Boy with the Book and the Globe. Horizontal.
  - 1958 Longslade Grammar School. The Mastery of Atom = Self-mastery. Horizontal.
  - 1959 Loughborough College of Technology. Diagonal concrete sculpture.
  - 1959 Hinckley College for further education. Cut out concrete relief.
- Warwickshire
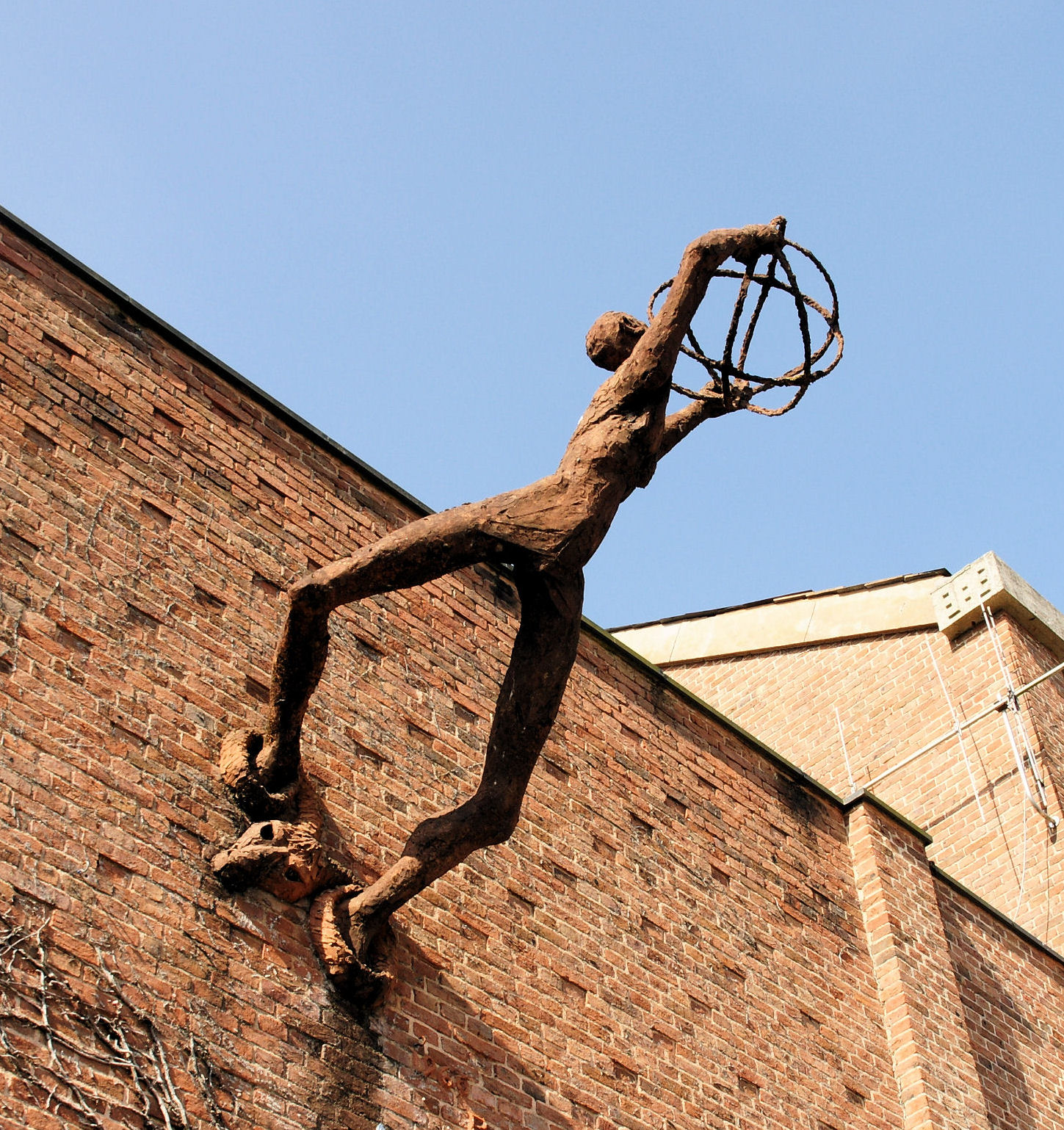
  Man of the World, Devonshire House, University of Exeter
  - 1957 Willenhall Primary School. Three dimensional sculpture.
  - 1958 Coventry. St. Michael Primary School. Coloured concrete relief.
  - 1965 Ernesford Grange Junior School, Coventry. Sculpture and relief. Polyester [There is a full page illustration of this work, with the sculptor alongside in the Exhibition catalogue referred to, on page 6. The figures represent a flautist and a singer.].
- 1959 Exeter University. Diagonal sculpture.
- 1961 Huddersfield High School for Girls. Horizontal sculpture and a relief.
- 1961 Scott Bader Commonwealth, Wollaston, Northamptonshire. The Man in Polyester. Horizontal.
- 1961 Forest Gate Methodist Church, London, E.7. The Preacher. Diagonal sculpture.
- 1963 East Ham, E.6. Kensington Youth Club. Diagonal sculpture.
- 1964 Long Eaton Secondary Modern. Three dimensional sculpture.

== Works in permanent collections ==
- Museum of Modern Art, New York
- Centre Pompidou, Paris
- Berardo Collection Museum, Lisbon
- Wilhelm Lehmbruck Museum, Duisburg
- Kunstmuseum Bochum, Bochum
- Holocaust Museum, Tel Aviv
- Museum für Angewandte Kunst, Cologne
- Museum de Grenoble, Grenoble
- Museum of Fine Arts, Budapest
- 1938 Tate Gallery. Bronze horse.
- 1960 The Coventry sculpture. Herbert Art Gallery and Museum, Coventry.
- 1947 Hungarian National Gallery. Budapest. Etchings.
- 1956 Museum of Tel Aviv. Etchings.
- 1950 British Museum. Gulliver's Travels. Etchings.
- 1964 British Museum. The Pilgrim's Progress. Etchings.
- 1965 U.S.A. Earlham College, Richmond, Indiana. The Pilgrim's Progress.
- Derbyshire Education Committee.
  - Sculpture and The Pilgrim's Progress Etchings.
- Leicestershire Education Committee. Sculptures.
- Camden London Borough Council. Sculptures.
- The Arts Council. Etching.

== Exhibitions ==
- 1922 Moholy-Nagy / Peri Der Sturm, Berlin
- 1923 Moholy-Nagy / Peri Der Sturm, Berlin
- 1924 Peri / Hilbersheimer / Nell Walden Der Sturm, Berlin
- 1931 Ernst Múzeum Budapest (with N. Ferenczy, L. Herman, K. Istokovics, M. Lehel).
- 1933 Bloomsbury Galleries London
- 1936 From Constructivism to Realism Foyle Art Gallery
- 1937 Gordon Fraser's Gallery Cambridge
- 1938 London Life in Concrete Soho Square, London
- 1948 People by Peri A.I.A. Gallery, London
- 1952 Sculpture in Relation to Architecture A.A. Bedford Square, London
- 1953 Exhibition arranged by the Football Association sponsored by the Arts Council
- 1958 Pilgrim's Progress St George's Gallery, London
- 1960 Sculpture and Etchings Herbert Art Gallery and Museum, Coventry
- 1961 Trades Union's Festival Exhibition, Bethnal Green
- 1963 St Pancras Arts Festival
- 1966 It's the People who Matter Lloyd's Gallery, Wimbledon
- 1967 Avant-garde Osteuropa 1910–1930 Academy of Arts, Berlin
- 1968 Peter Peri 1899–1967 Central Library Swiss Cottage, London
- 1970 Peri's People The Minories, Colchester
- 1973 Laszlo Peri. Werke 1920–1924 und das Problem des Shaped Canvas, Kölnischer Kunstverein, Cologne
- 1982 Laszlo Peri 1899–1967. Arbeiten in Beton, Neue Gesellschaft für Bildende Kunst, Berlin
- 1987 László Moholy-Nagy / Laszlo Peri, Graphisches Kabinett, Bremen
- 1999 László Péris konstruktivistische Werke 1920-1924, Museum of Fine Arts, Budapest
- 2008 Peter Peri Exhibition, Sam Scorer Gallery, Lincoln.
