= The History of Ranching (Winn) =

Mural in San Antonio, Texas

- Artist: James Buchanan “Buck” Winn
- Year: c. 1950–1986
- Type: Exterior oil based on canvas
- Dimensions: 1.8 m × 85 m (6 ft × 280 ft)
- Location: Various

The History of Ranching is a mural that was originally located at the Pearl Brewery in San Antonio, Texas. The Pearl Brewing Company had always preferred to use Texas artists whenever possible. Long after other brewers had moved to using only photographs in their advertising campaigns, Pearl continued to use ads that featured sketches, drawings, or paintings of the concept or product. The more famous of Pearl's artistic advertisements were of Judge Roy Bean's Jersey Lilly and a collage called The Last Fight of Manolete. Both works saw wide distribution as large printed pictures framed and intended to hang in pubs and bars. The subjects and sizes changed constantly in Pearl's ads, but one thing remained the same, Pearl made it a point to use local artists.

With Pearl's art advertisements reaching their entire distribution area and being seen by countless consumers, it's ironic that Pearl's most important commissioned work was seen by so few. In the early 1950s the then San Antonio Brewing Association decided to renovate the old brewery stables and transform them into an entertainment hall and hospitality room. Sticking with their theme of marketing at the time, the interior was designed around the legend of Judge Roy Bean and the Old West. The newly renovated stables were named the Pearl Corral, and the entertainment room featured a stage designed after Roy Bean's saloon and was dubbed the Corral Room (pictures of which can be seen below in the Historical Images section). Pearl intended the finishing touch to the Corral Room to be a mural that wrapped the entire diameter of the room's second tier. Once again Pearl looked locally for the artist, and in 1950 they commissioned James Buchanan “Buck” Winn to create the massive oil painting.

Buck Winn was already a well-known artist in Texas, but his mural for Pearl would put his name and the brewery in the record books. The room's second tier was only a little over six feet tall, but since it was an oval shape Pearl wanted the mural to run continuously around the entire perimeter of the room. When completed and installed, the painting was six feet tall and 280 feet (85 m) long, wrapping all the way around the Corral Room and creating a 360-degree mural depicting the West. Buck Winn's masterpiece was titled “The History of Ranching,” and took its rightful place in the record books as the largest mural in the world. Unfortunately though, the work was so massive reproductions were impossible and photos of the Corral Room could only show portions of the painting. So, unless people visited the Pearl Corral for an event or on a brewery tour, the public never saw much of Buck Winn's mural.

For over two decades Buck Winn's work was the centerpiece in the Pearl's Corral Room. While the painting was there, it was oblivious of the changes occurring around it. By the 1970s the company running the brewery was very different from the one that had built the Corral Room back in the 1950s. The San Antonio Brewing Association had changed its name to the Pearl Brewing Company in 1952. By the 1970s the Pearl Brewing Company name had remained, but Southdown Corporation out of Houston, Texas, was now in charge of Pearl. Southdown's ideas for the brewery were drastically different from when Pearl was an independent company, and these new ideas spilled over to the Corral. After 20 years of use, the Corral as a whole was less than pristine. Southdown decided to remodel the Corral to bring it up to the current building codes and give it new look. Unfortunately, America's fascination with the old West was long over, so Southdown decided to renovate the Corral Room into the Lillie Langtry Room and renamed the Pearl Corral to the Jersey Lilly.

When the renovations occurred, Buck Winn's mural was taken down and disappeared from the public eye for almost 30 years. The mural was untagged and unprotected, hidden away in a storage shed on the brewery grounds. There it sat, out of sight and forgotten by almost everyone. In fact, if not for the efforts of one individual, the mural might have been lost forever. Dr. Dorey Schmidt was able to not only track down the mural, but acquire it so that Buck Winn's work could be put back on public display. The following is Dr. Schmidt's account of her recovery of the Buck Winn mural.

"Indiana" Schmidt and the Lost Mural
2001 Dorey Schmidt, Ph.D.

One day in the early 1990s, Dorey Schmidt visited Four Winns Ranch during a Wimberley Civic Club Home Tour. Fascinated with the cultural treasure represented by James Buchanan "Buck" Winn’s studio, and dismayed by the inappropriate obscurity of his work, Schmidt hit upon the idea of creating a “TexKit,” a sort of mobile, hands-on educational exhibit pioneered by the Institute of Texan Cultures.

Schmidt drew up plans for a “WinnKit,” presented them for the approval of the Wimberley Institute of Cultures board, and then applied for a grant from the Texas Committee for the Humanities. Using funds from that grant, Schmidt wrote the script, assembled photographs, reproductions, and artifacts into a cedar presentation trunk hand-crafted by her husband, Robert Schmidt, a wood artisan. Using the WinnKit, she told the story of Buck Winn’s artistic and architectural genius to local civic organizations and hundreds of Wimberley schoolchildren. For many, seeing the WinnKit in action was their first introduction to his work. Other docents continued those presentations for a number of years.

It was during the process of researching for the WinnKit that Schmidt stumbled on the first clues to the “Lost Mural.” Pinned to the huge working wall of Winn’s studio were several sections of a cartoon (preliminary sketch) for a very large mural with a Western theme, containing cowboys and cattle and other depictions of early ranching days. Sorting through 35 mm slides, Schmidt found a picture of what was obviously part of the finished mural, installed in a room with a rail fence and wooden tables and chairs. Questioning old friends and family members, she learned that the mural had been a commission for the hospitality room of a brewery in San Antonio in the early 1950s.

Over the years, as banks and public buildings were remodeled or razed, a number of Buck Winn’s major works were lost or destroyed—installations like the wonderful murals in the Medical Arts Building in Dallas, and the magnificent gold-leaf bas-relief of the “History of Flight” at Amon Carter Airport in Fort Worth, and other works of art whose only remaining record is a photograph or sketch. As an art historian, Schmidt wanted to find out what had happened to the mural at the brewery. Did it still exist? Or was it another piece of Buck Winn’s art that was lost forever?

Again consulting local acquaintances, she learned that the brewery was the Pearl Brewery, a venerable Texas brand of beer whose San Antonio plant had been sold to Olympia, a brewing company headquartered in the Northwest. The hospitality room, which was housed in the huge oval structure that had once been the horse barn, was only being used for company and private functions, and was no longer open to the public. Even more ominous was the news that the Corral Room had been remodeled in the early 1970s, and was now adorned in gilt and red velvet as the Lillie Langtry Room!

But, donning her “Indiana Jones” explorer’s hat, Schmidt was determined to find out which list the mural was on—the list of the lost—or the list of the rediscovered. She called the brewery, seeking information. No one knew. After all, the remodel had taken place more than twenty years past, and many of the new executives were from out-of-state and knew little of the brewery’s history.

One day as Schmidt pleaded on the phone for some kind of information, any clue as to what had happened to the mural, Mr. Jack Kratz, the vice-president of marketing, finally said, "I’m sorry that I don't know anything about the Buck Winn mural, but I just remembered . . . there was a man who once worked here as manager of the hospitality room. He's retired now, but he might know something." Aha! Schmidt was encouraged. From her faculty office at UT-Pan American in the Rio Grande Valley, she called the number she’d been given. Mr. Chuck Remling answered the phone. “Mr. Remling, this is Dr. Dorey Schmidt. I understand that you once worked for Pearl Brewery, and that’s where I obtained your number. I’d like to ask you some questions, if I may?" "Well, I guess I can do that," was the answer. "They told me you were the manager of the Corral Room, is that right?" "Yes, I worked there fourteen years." "And you were there when it was remodeled?" "Yes." "Great!" Schmidt quickly got to the point. "Mr. Remling, do you remember what happened to the Buck Winn mural that was on the wall?" There was a brief silence on the other end of the phone line. "Who wants to know?" BINGO! Getting warmer! Schmidt identified herself again and told him why she was asking these questions. Then the whole story came out:

"I always liked that mural, and when they were remodeling and took it down, they were just going to throw it in the dumpster. But I thought that it might have some historic value—or at the very least, there were a couple of panels that I thought I could cut out and frame for my house (his listener shuddered), so I took the rolls of canvas and put them on top of some cabinets in a storage room. I kind of forgot about them, and later, when I retired, I don’t know what happened to them. I guess they could still be there."

Within minutes, Schmidt was back on the phone with the brewery V-P, describing the location of the storage shed. Within the hour, he called back. “We’ve got your pictures. What do you want us to do with them?” Weak with relief that the mural still existed, Schmidt explained that she was prepared to enter into negotiations with the brewery to arrange a possible donation of this valuable art work so that it could be brought home to Wimberley, where it was created. The V-P’s next comment stunned her. “When do you want to come get it?” Her answer to that was swift. “Tomorrow!” No need to give him time to change his mind!

Schmidt frantically phoned the rest of the Winn committee and told them to get a rental truck. She called Southwest Texas State University Library to arrange for climate-controlled storage of the huge (280 feet long) mural. Contacting a local museum for guidelines, she prepared a draft of a gift agreement which would legalize the acquisition. And the next day she drove up from the Rio Grande Valley to San Antonio, while Julie Harrison, Dodie Spencer and Robert Schmidt drove down from Wimberley to meet her at the Pearl Brewery.

They rendezvoused at the brewery, where the rolls of canvas were stacked neatly on the asphalt floor of a shed. A couple of workers stood by to load the rolls. Mr. Kratz signaled them to unroll a portion to be sure it was the right painting, and as they did, one of the workers grabbed a straw broom to remove some of the twenty years of dust. The combined screams of the women persuaded him that was not the thing to do! The rolls were loaded into the rental truck, and the triumphant entourage drove away. Buck Winn’s lost mural, “The History of Ranching,” had been found.

But the story doesn’t end there. The mural was examined, and was in remarkable condition for having been stored for over twenty years in an unheated, uncooled shed under the broiling Texas sun. But Buck Winn often used house paint on his murals, and in this case that turned out to have been a wise choice. WIC made plans for restoration, but it was going to be very expensive for the more than 2,000 square feet (200 m^{2}) of canvas. Just one fifteen-foot section would cost $7500 to be repaired and restored by a conservator.

About that time, Dr. Schmidt was invited to give a lecture at the Delaware Art Museum in Wilmington. During her PhD. internship there, Schmidt had become acquainted with Helen Sloan, the widow of famous “Ashcan School” artist John Sloan. Now Helen was living in a retirement home, and Schmidt went to visit. There she told the story of the lost mural, thinking that it would entertain her elderly friend.

At the end of the account, Helen Sloan asked, "Is your organization a non-profit group?" When Schmidt responded, "Yes," Helen continued, "You know, the John and Helen Sloan Art Foundation provides seed money for groups who are working on arts projects. I would like to send your group something to help."

Schmidt thanked her for her generosity and returned home, telling the WIC Board that the organization might even get $500 from that one story-telling session. Within a few weeks, however, when a letter from the Sloan Foundation arrived in the WIC mailbox, the check enclosed was for $5000! Local contributions made up the rest, and the work on the mural restoration began.

So the generosity of an East Coast art foundation actually provided the funds for restoring this first section of the Buck Winn “History of Ranching” mural. This section is on display at the Wimberley Visitor Center, pending the completion of Wimberley’s Community Center, which is set for April 1, 2006.

Although the original Winn Committee had hoped that the entire mural could be returned to Wimberley and reassembled, interest from private collectors and the need for additional restoration funds led to the sale of some sections when another WIC committee, headed by Pete Anderson and Al Sander, took charge of the mural. Through their efforts, another section was restored and is displayed in the main entry hall of Wimberley High School.

Through gift and purchase, the Southwest Writers Collection of the Alkek Library at Texas State University (formerly Southwest Texas State University) now owns some eighty feet of the mural which will be restored and installed on permanent display in the main lobby of that building.

So, through the persistence of “Indiana” Schmidt, and her search for the lost mural, Buck Winn’s “The History of Ranching” survives, and a major work by this noted artist can be enjoyed for generations to come.

Unfortunately, the painting isn't viewable in its entirety. The sheer size of the mural made reassembling the work an impossible task. Thanks to the amazing efforts of Dr. Schmidt, the Wimberley Institute of Cultures and Texas State University–San Marcos plan on putting 8 of the original 11 panels on public display. Best of all, Wimberley and Texas State are only 15 miles (24 km) apart, making it an easy trip to visit the majority of the mural. Just in case you can't make the trip, Texas State's portion of the mural, called "The Chuckwagon," can be seen below. Additionally, both organizations have created restoration project Web pages, allowing easy access to new information as it becomes available.

Texas State University's portion of the Buck Winn mural. This section alone is over 75 feet wide.
