= Leo Lerch =

Czech painter (1856–1892)

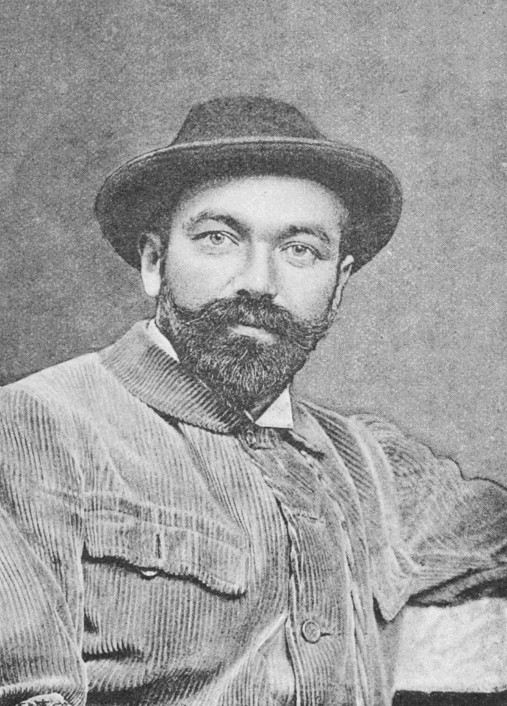
Photographic portrait (1892)

Leo, Léon, or Lev Lerch (13 August 1856 – 6 May 1892) was a painter from Austria-Hungary.

== Life ==
Leo Lerch was born in Smíchov, near Prague, on 13 August 1856. He studied at the Munich Academy and was a pupil of Ludwig von Löfftz. He became known as a history painter. He won a bronze medal in Paris at the 1889 Exposition Universelle. He died in Smíchov on 6 May 1892.

== Holdings ==
- Munich (Neue Pinakothek): Pietà
- Prague (Galerie Rudolfinum): Bust of an Old Man
- Prague (National Gallery Prague): "Will o the Wisp"

== Gallery ==
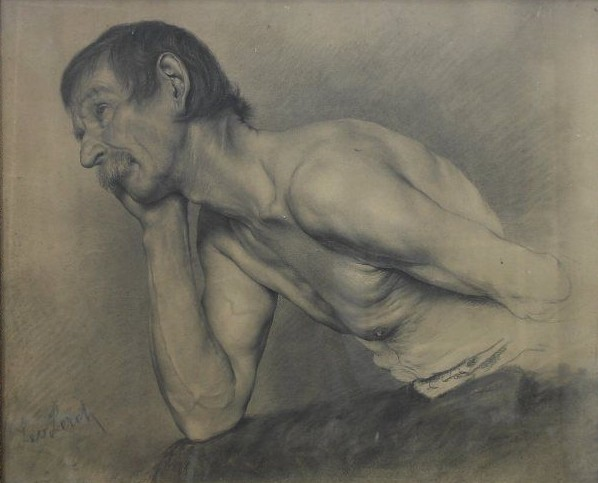
Starý muž (c. 1862)

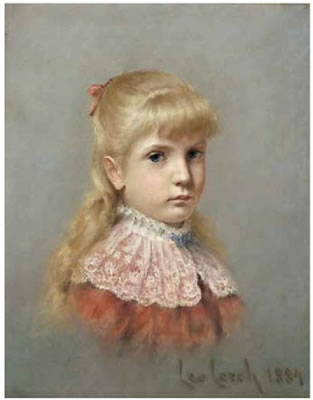
Mädchenporträt (1884)

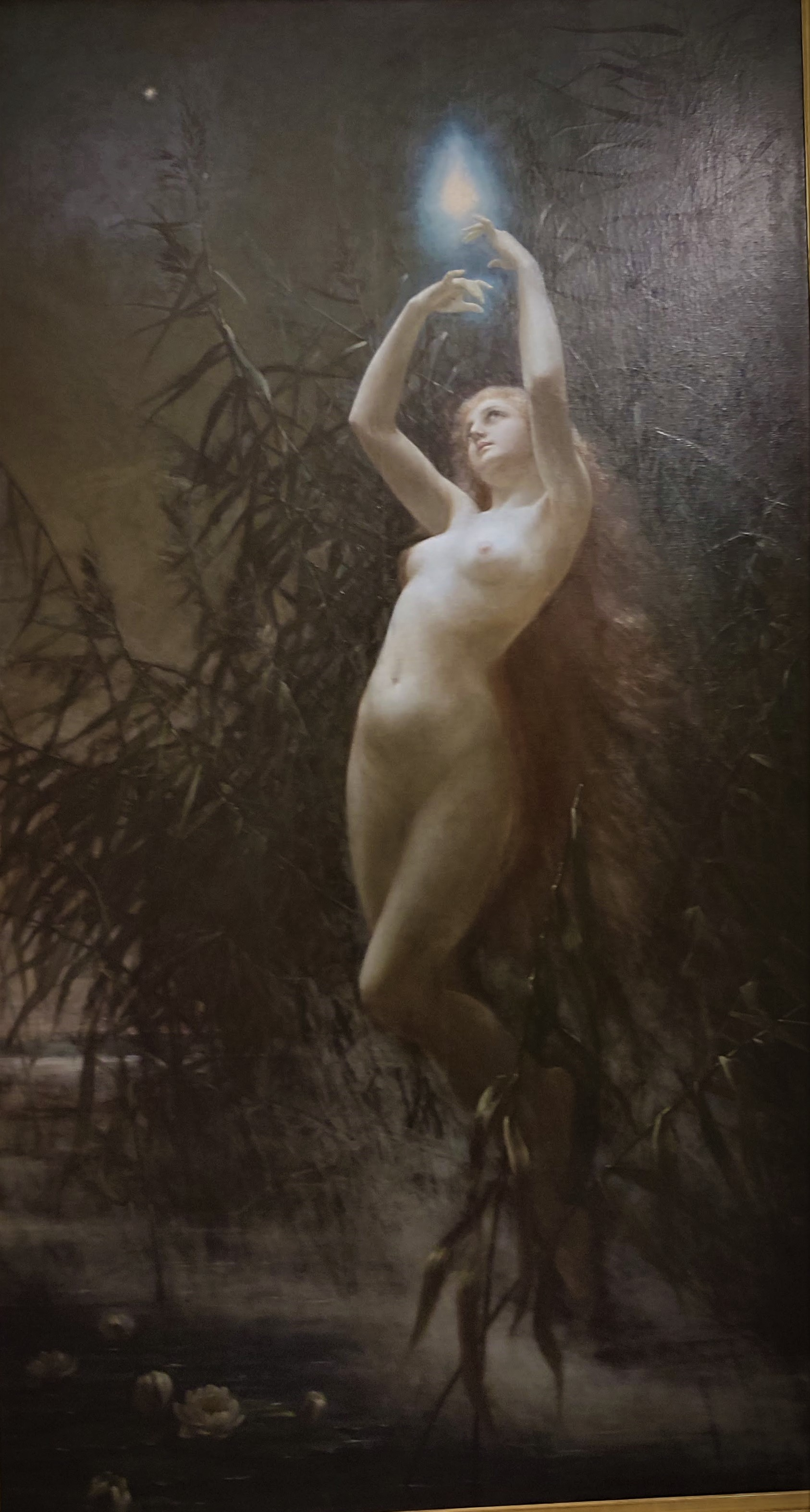
Bludička (1888)

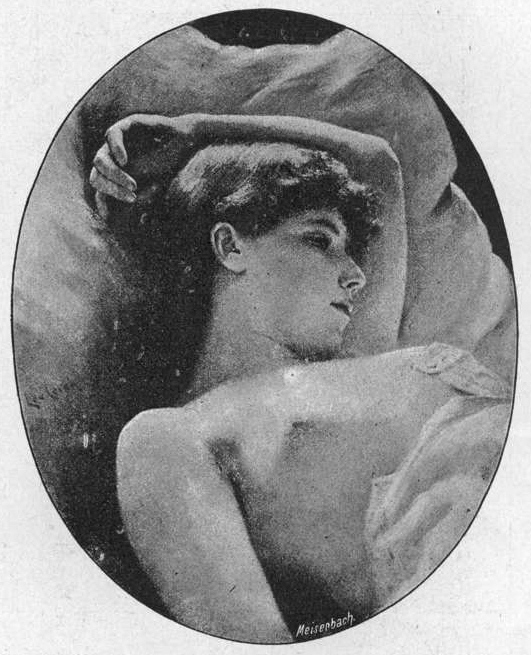
Erwacht (1888)

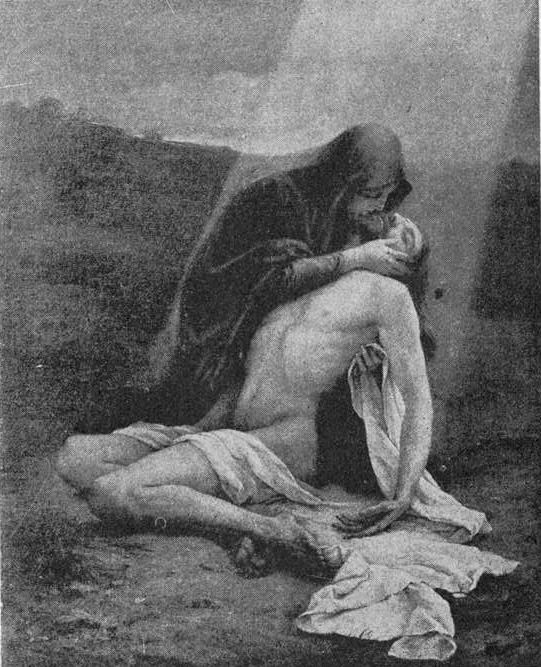
Pietà (c. 1891)

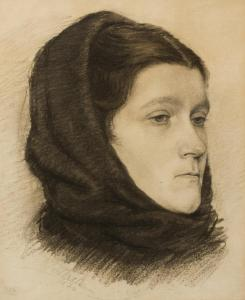
Frauenkopf

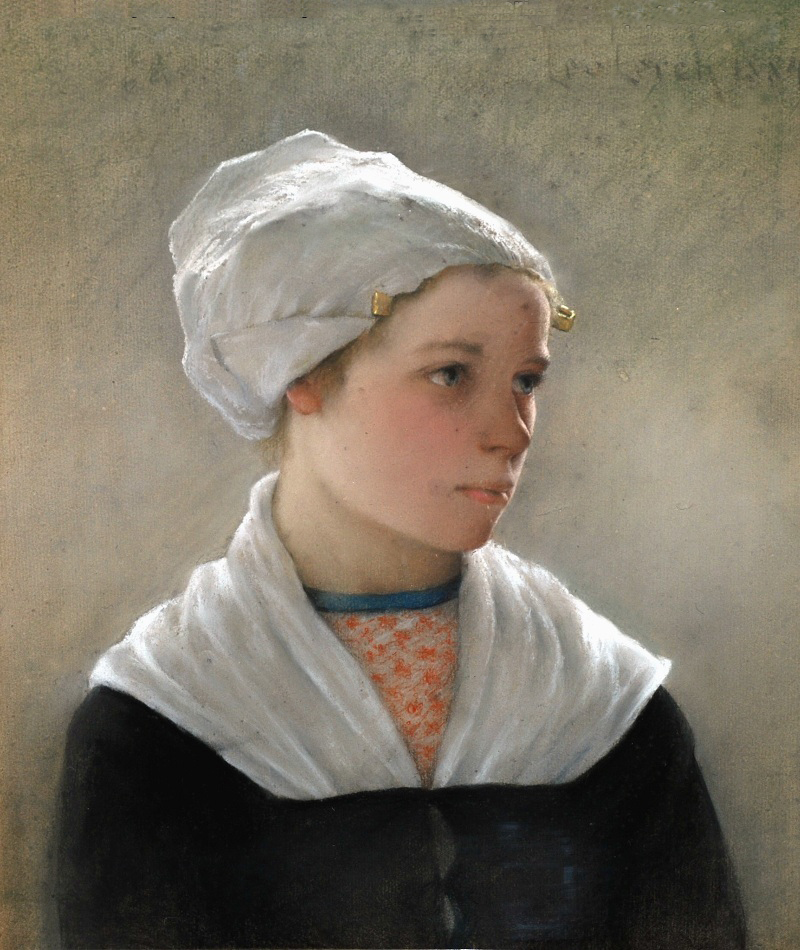
Portrét dívky

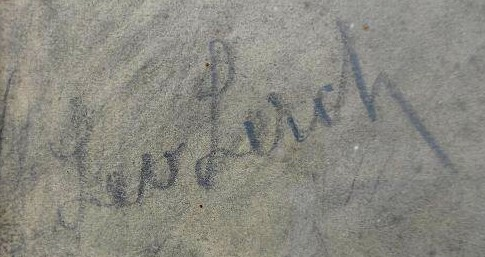
Signature

== Sources ==
- Beyer, Andreas; Savoy, Bénédicte; Tegethoff, Wolf, eds. (2021). "Lerch, Leo". In Allgemeines Künstlerlexikon - Internationale Künstlerdatenbank - Online. K. G. Saur. Retrieved 8 October 2022.
- Weitenweber, Vilém (13 May 1892). "Lev Lerch". Zlatá Praha, 9(26): pp. 311–312. (in Czech).
- "Lerch, Leo or Léon". Benezit Dictionary of Artists. 2011. Oxford Art Online. Retrieved 8 October 2022.
