= Rosalind Savill =

British museum curator (1951–2024)

Dame Rosalind Savill DBE FSA FBA
- Born: Rosalind Joy Savill; 12 May 1951; Lyndhurst, Hampshire, England
- Died: 27 December 2024 (aged 73); UK
- Education: Wycombe Abbey; University of Leeds
- Occupation: Director of the Wallace Collection

Dame Rosalind Joy Savill DBE FSA FBA (12 May 1951 – 27 December 2024) was a British art and museum curator.

== Life and career ==
Savill was born in Lyndhurst, Hampshire, England, on 12 May 1951. An alumna of Wycombe Abbey and the University of Leeds, Savill was first employed at the Victoria and Albert Museum as a canteen cashier. Later she was named Museum Assistant at the Wallace Collection, where she was appointed Assistant to the Director in 1978. In April 1988, Savill's The Wallace Collection Catalogue of Sèvres Porcelain was published in three volumes, which took her a decade to compile.

In 1992, she was named Director of the Wallace Collection. She retired from that post in 2011.

Savill died from cancer on 27 December 2024, at the age of 73.

== Honours and awards ==
Rosalind Savill was appointed a Fellow of the Society of Antiquaries and a fellow of the Royal Society of the Arts in 1990. That same year she was awarded the National Art Collections Fund Prize for her scholarship. For services to the study of ceramics she was appointed Commander of the British Empire in 2000. A fellowship of the British Academy was bestowed on her in 2006. For services to the arts, she was appointed a Dame Commander of the British Empire in 2009. The French government made her an Officier dans l'Ordre des Arts et des Lettres in 2013.

== Affiliations ==
- National Trust Arts Panel, Member
- Art Advisory Committee, Amgueddfa Cymru – Museum Wales
- Royal Mint Advisory Committee
- Museums and Collections Advisory Committee, English Heritage
- Somerset House, Trustee
- Campaign for Museums
- Camden School for Girls, Governor
- French Porcelain Society, President
