= The Sunbathers =

Sculpture by Peter Laszlo Peri

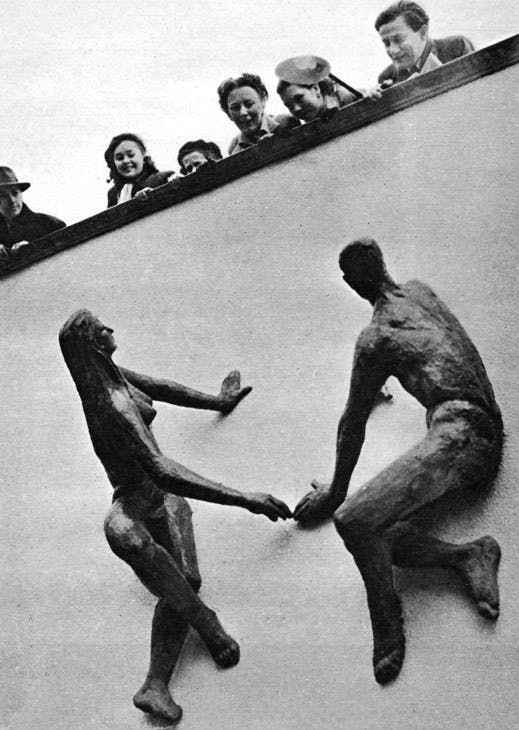
Sunbathing group by Peter Laszlo Peri, 1951

The Sunbathers, originally titled “Sunbathing Group” is a sculpture by Hungarian artist Peter Laszlo Peri, made for the Festival of Britain in 1951. After the Festival closed, the sculpture disappeared and it was presumed to be lost. After being rediscovered in 2016, the restored sculpture was initially put on display in the Royal Festival Hall on the South Bank, before being put on display in London Waterloo, a major railway terminus in 2020.

== History ==
=== Festival of Britain ===
Hungarian born artist Peter Laszlo Peri was invited to produce a sculpture for the Festival of Britain - a national exhibition and fair held in 1951 on the South Bank of the River Thames in London.

His first proposal titled 'Reflections' was deemed too big for the site and he eventually contributed 'Sunbathing Group'. Two reclining figures mounted directly on the wall as if seen by the viewer from above. This inverted orientation, which Peri often used and termed “horizontal sculpture” in accordance with the viewers relationship to the work, has its roots in the disorientating aerial perspectives of 1920s New Vision photography and Constructivist visual theory.

The full-size concrete work, made from "Peri-crete" a continuation of the artist’s Constructivist interest in the use of new materials, was mounted on a wall at the entrance to the festival site on the South Bank, at the gate on York Road near Waterloo station. Dylan Thomas mentioned the sculpture in an essay written after he visited the Festival, as "the linked terra-cotta man and woman fly-defying gravity and elegantly hurrying up a W.C. wall". The sculpture disappeared after the exhibition closed, and it was believed to have been lost.

=== Rediscovery ===
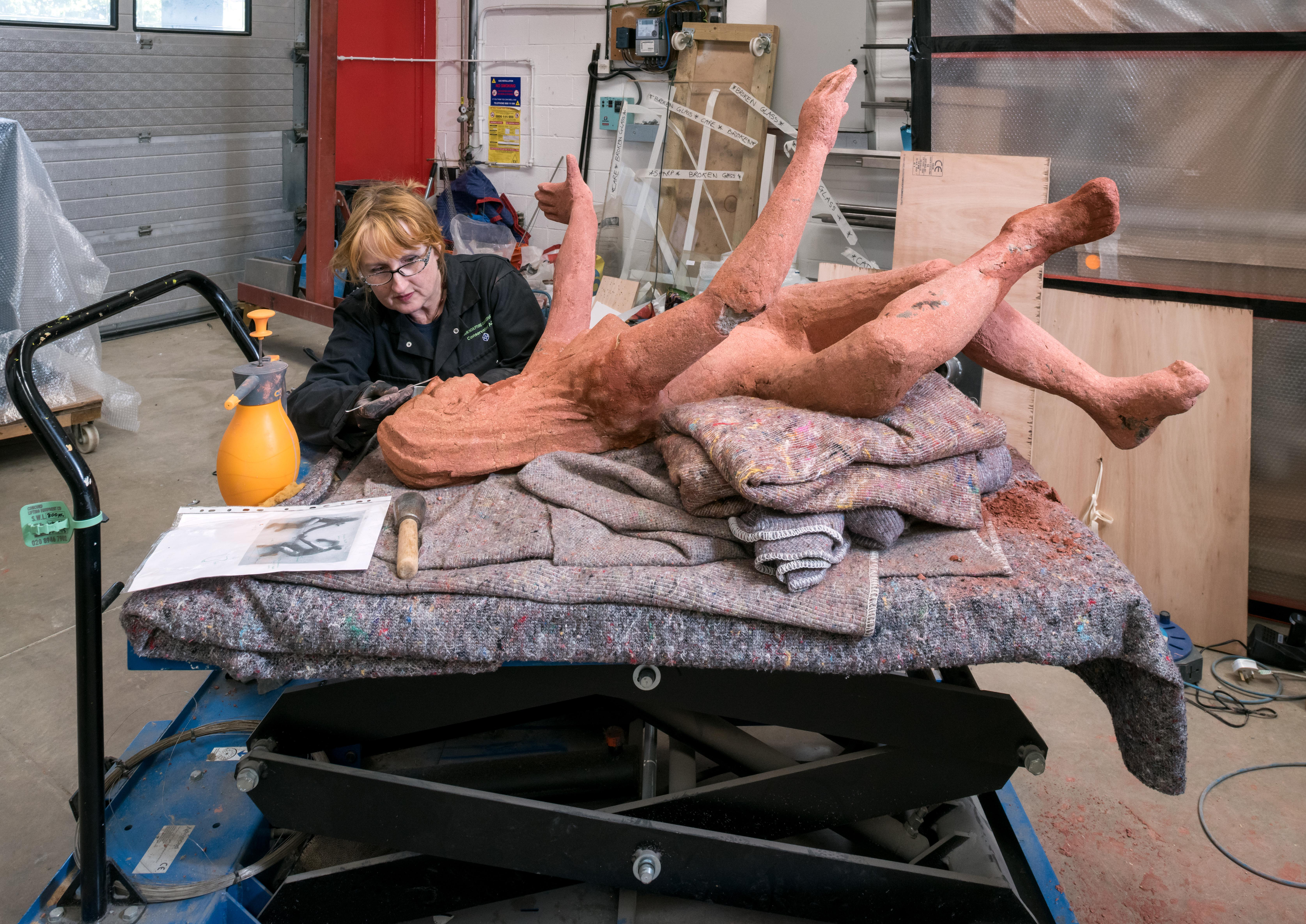
The work being restored by Tessa Jackson

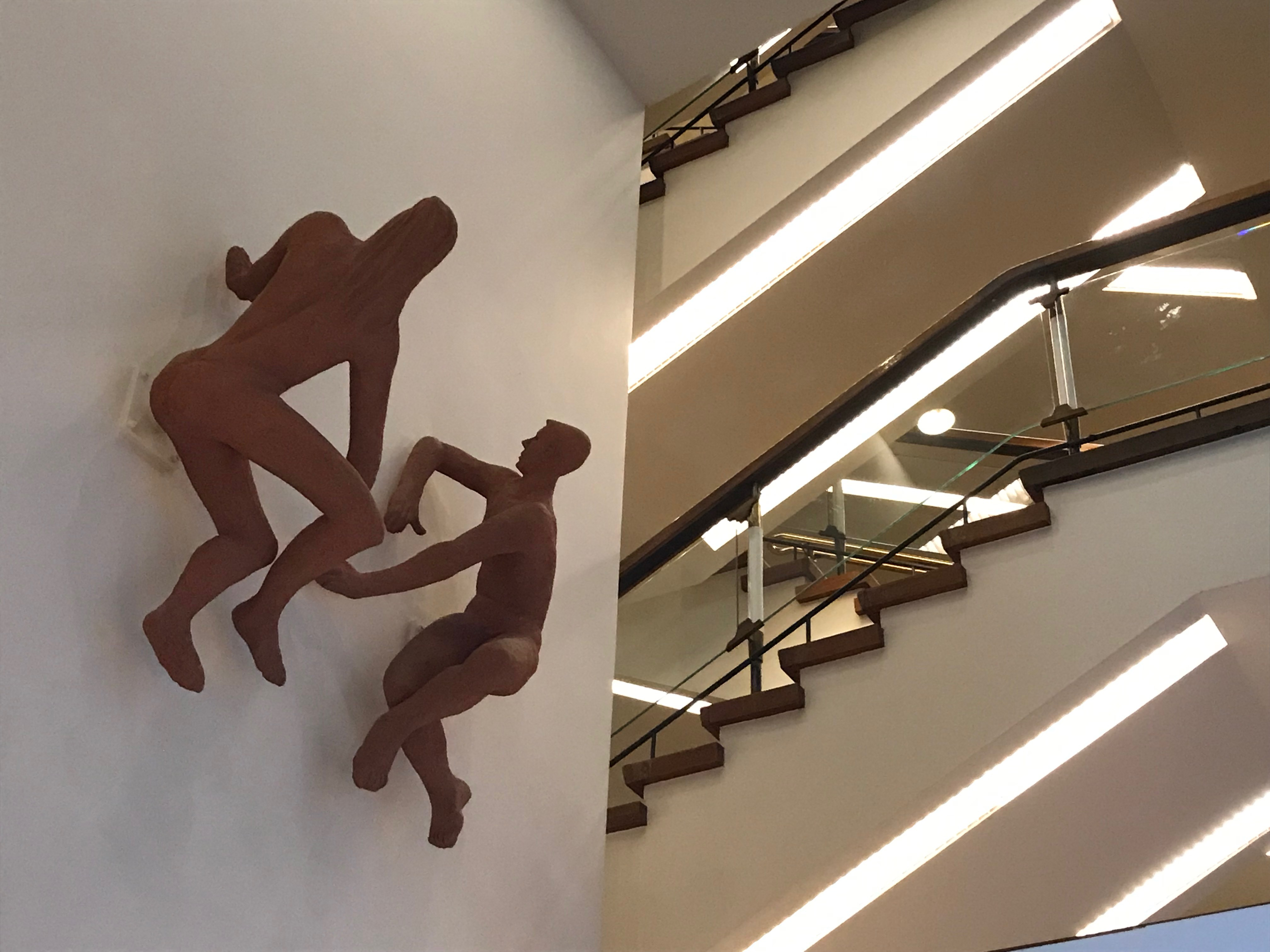
The Sunbathers on display in the Royal Festival Hall in December 2018

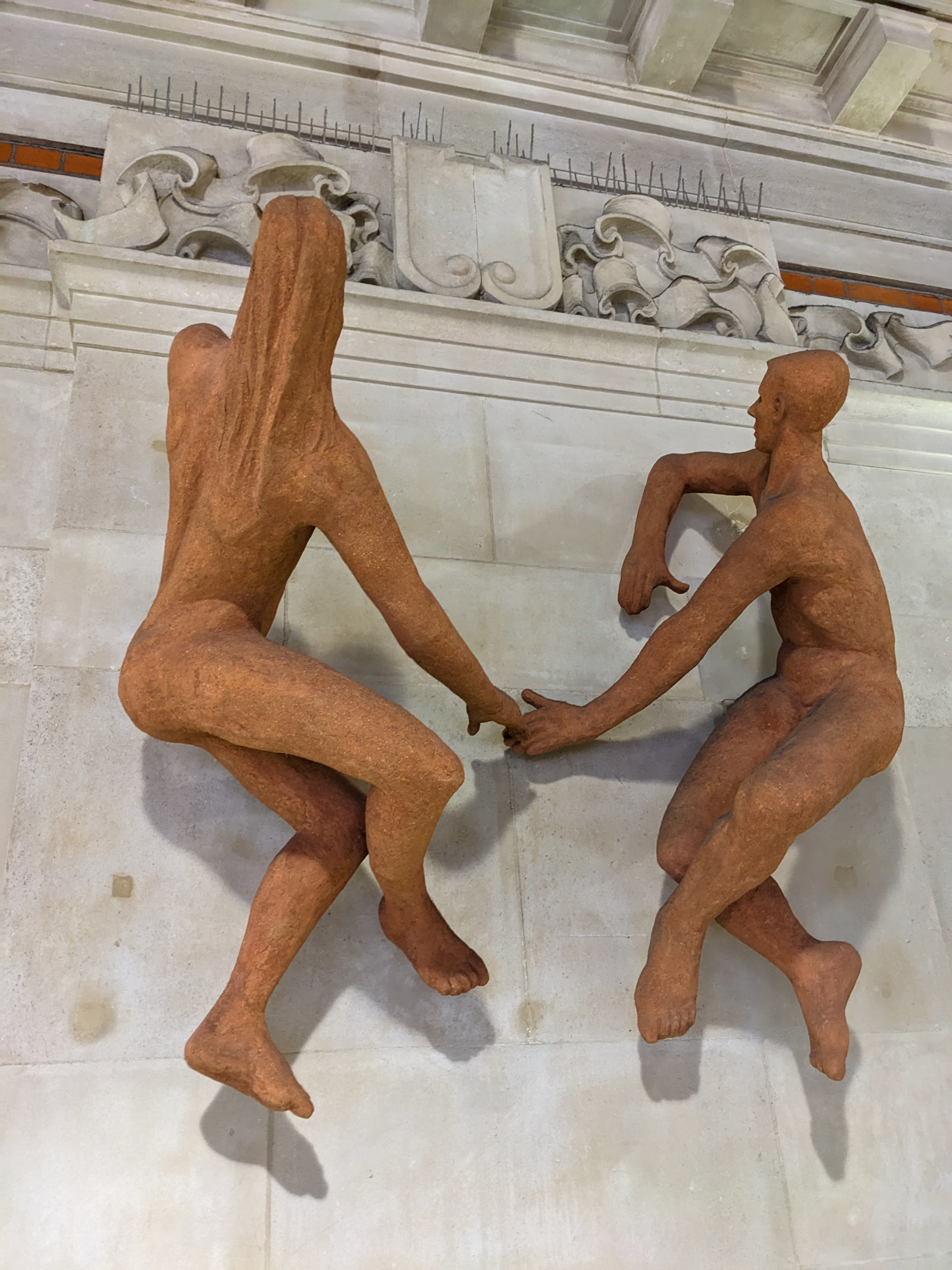
The Sunbathers at London Waterloo station in January 2023

When Historic England held an exhibition of lost art in 2016, the work was rediscovered in pieces at The Clarendon Hotel in Blackheath. A former proprietor of the hotel, Joseph O'Donnell purportedly bought the work at an auction in the 1950s or the 1960s, although there are no records of how this publicly commissioned sculpture fell into private hands. Mr O’ Donell displayed it at his previous hotel, the Westcombe Park Hotel, later moving it to his new hotel in Blackheath, where it was displayed on a patio in the hotel garden, and used as a children's climbing frame. The work deteriorated and was later removed from public display.

A campaign to restore the sculpture raised £15,000 in 5 days, with contributions from the Heritage Lottery Fund, NESTA and the Department for Culture, Media and Sport. The work was restored by Tessa Jackson of Jackson Sculpture Conservation Ltd. After restoration, it returned to the Southbank Centre, and was displayed in public at the Royal Festival Hall for three years. In August 2020, the sculpture was put on public display for five years at London Waterloo, a major railway terminus. The new site is closer to the (now demolished) wall that the sculpture was mounted during the Festival of Britain.
