= The Stations of the Cross (Newman) =

Painting series by Barnett Newman

- Artist: Barnett Newman
- Year: 1958–1966
- Medium: Magna, oil and acrylic on canvas
- Movement: Abstract expressionism
- Location: National Gallery of Art, Washington, D.C.

The Stations of the Cross is a series of fifteen abstract expressionist paintings created between 1958 and 1966 by Barnett Newman, often considered to be his greatest work. It consists of fourteen paintings, each named after one of Jesus's fourteen Stations, followed by a coda, Be II. Unlike most depictions of the Stations of the Cross, Newman did not intend for this to be a narrative journey of Jesus's suffering. Rather, it was intended to evoke the central question of the Passion, lema sabachthani (why have you forsaken me?). The secular, Jewish Newman used this central theme of Christian theology to probe the human condition rather than towards its historical purpose of devotion or worship.

The series has been seen as a memorial to the victims of the Holocaust.

== History ==
The painting series was unveiled at the Solomon R. Guggenheim Museum in 1966, in an exhibition titled The Stations of the Cross: Lema Sabachthani.

The National Gallery of Art bought the paintings in 1987 from Newman's widow for an estimated $5 to $7 million, through a donation from Robert and Jane Meyerhoff. They were put on permanent display.

== Paintings ==
Image	Title	Year	Medium
	First Station	1958	Magna on canvas
	Second Station	1958	Magna on canvas
	Third Station	1960	Oil on canvas
	Fourth Station	1960	Oil on canvas
	Fifth Station	1962	Oil on canvas
	Sixth Station	1962	Oil on canvas
	Seventh Station	1964	Oil on canvas
	Eighth Station	1964	Oil on canvas
	Ninth Station	1964	Acrylic on canvas
	Tenth Station	1965	Magna on canvas
	Eleventh Station	1965	Acrylic on canvas
	Twelfth Station	1965	Acrylic on canvas
	Thirteenth Station	1965/1966	Acrylic on canvas
	Fourteenth Station	1965/1966	Acrylic and Duco on canvas
	Be II	1961/1964	Acrylic and oil on canvas

== Exhibition history ==
Dates	Museum	City	Show
April 20 – June 19, 1966	Solomon R. Guggenheim Museum	New York City	The Stations of the Cross: Lema Sabachthani
October 21, 1971 – January 10, 1972	Museum of Modern Art	New York City	Barnett Newman
June 1, 1978 – January 14, 1979	National Gallery of Art	Washington, DC	American Art at Mid-Century: The Subjects of the Artist
May 31 – July 13, 1980	Schloss Charlottenburg	Berlin	Signs of Faith, Spirit of the Avant-Garde: Religious Tendencies in 20th Century Art
March 24 – July 7, 2002	Philadelphia Museum of Art	Philadelphia	Barnett Newman
September 19, 2002 – January 5, 2003	Tate Modern	London	Barnett Newman
June 7 – October 12, 2014	de Young Museum	San Francisco	Modernism from the National Gallery of Art: The Robert + Jane Meyerhoff Collection
March 14 – June 7, 2015	Miho Museum	Kyoto	Barnett Newman: The Stations of the Cross
