= Abram Games =

British graphic designer (1914–1996)

- Born: Abraham Gamse; 29 July 1914; Whitechapel, London, England
- Died: 27 August 1996 (aged 82); London, England
- Education: Saint Martin's School of Art
- Known for: Graphic design
- Spouse: Marianne Salfeld (m. 1945; died 1988)
- Website: Official website

Abram Games OBE, RDI (29 July 1914 – 27 August 1996) was a British graphic designer. The style of his work – refined but vigorous compared to the work of contemporaries – has earned him a place in the pantheon of the best of 20th-century graphic designers. In acknowledging his power as a propagandist, he claimed, "I wind the spring and the public, in looking at the poster, will have that spring released in its mind." Because of the length of his career – over six decades – his work is essentially a record of the era's social history. Some of Britain's most iconic images include those by Games. An example is the "Join the ATS" poster of 1941, nicknamed the "blonde bombshell" recruitment poster. His work is recognised for its "striking colour, bold graphic ideas, and beautifully integrated typography".

== Early life and career ==
Born Abraham Gamse in Whitechapel, London on 29 July, the day after World War I began in 1914, he was the son of Joseph Gamse, a Latvian photographer, and Sarah, nee Rosenberg, a seamstress born on the border of Russia and Poland. His father, who had emigrated to Britain in 1904, anglicised the family name to Games when Abram was 12. Games left Hackney Downs School at the age of 16 and, in 1930, went to Saint Martin's School of Art in London. Disillusioned by the teaching at Saint Martin's and worried about the expense of studying there, Games left after two terms. However, Games was determined to establish himself as a poster artist so while working as a "studio boy" for the commercial design firm Askew-Young in London between 1932 and 1936, he attended night classes in life drawing. He was fired from this position due to his jumping over four chairs as a prank. In 1934, his entry was second in the Health Council Competition and, in 1935, won a poster competition for the London County Council. From 1936 to 1940, he worked on his own as a freelance poster artist. An article on him in the influential journal Art and Industry in 1937 led to several high-profile commissions for Games, from the General Post Office, London Transport, Royal Dutch Shell and others.

== World War Two ==
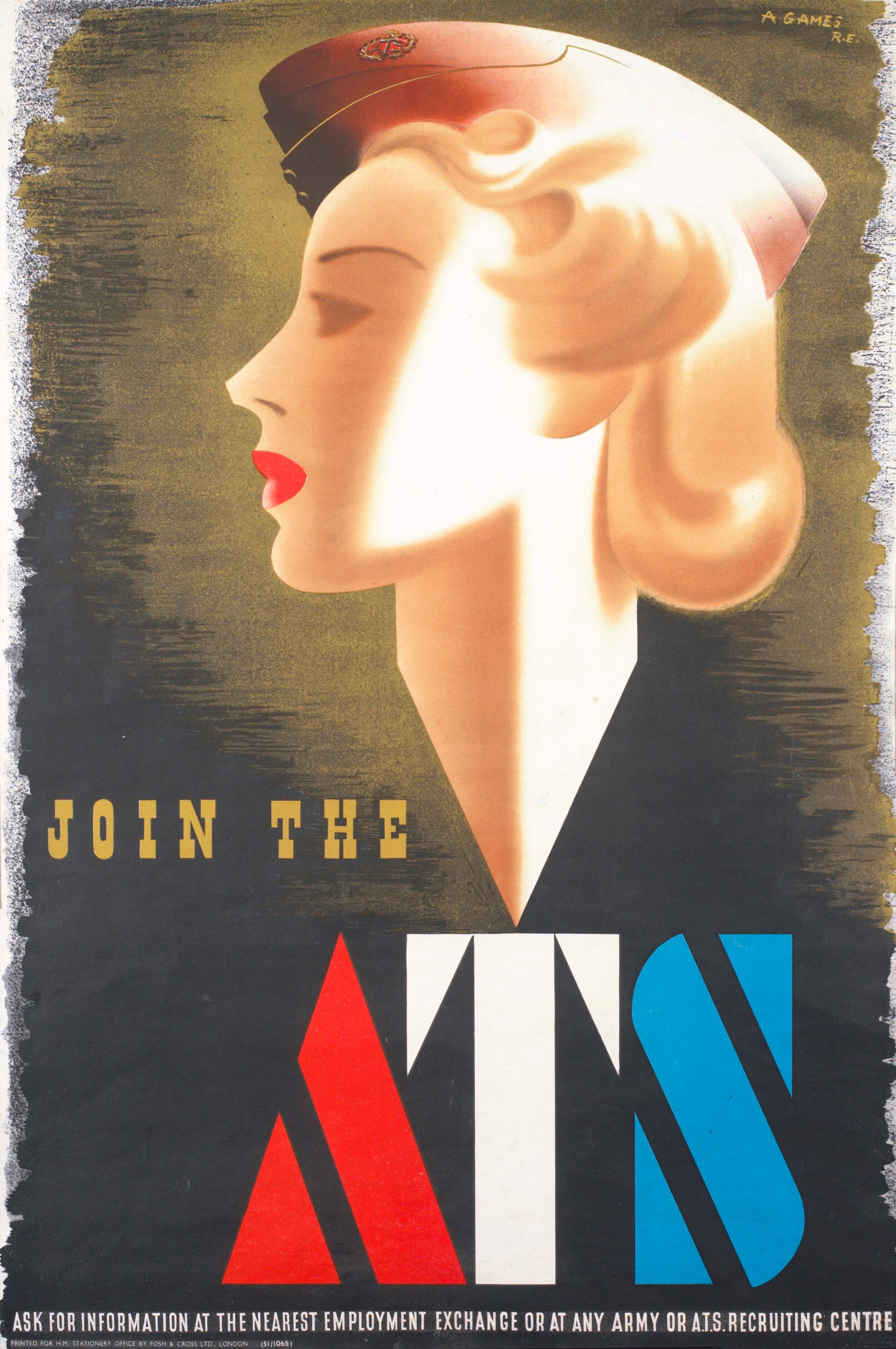
Join the ATS (1941) Art.IWMPST2832

At the start of World War Two, Games was conscripted into the British Army. He served until 1941 when he was approached by the Public Relations Department of the War Office who were looking for a graphic designer to produce a recruitment poster for the Royal Armoured Corps. From 1942 Games's service as the Official War Artist for posters resulted in 100 or so posters. Games was allowed a great deal of artistic freedom which enabled him to produce many striking images, often with surrealist elements. Among his first designs was the Auxiliary Territorial Service recruitment poster that became known as the blonde bombshell. Games had wanted to challenge the rather drab image of the ATS but the authorities feared that the glamorous image he had produced would encourage young women to join the ATS for the "wrong reasons" and the poster was quickly withdrawn. The design Games replaced it with was criticised by Winston Churchill as being too "Soviet".

Other notable posters included Your Talk May Kill Your Comrades (1942) in which a spiral symbolising gossip originates from a soldiers mouth to become a bayonet attacking three of his comrades. Games used the photographic techniques he had learnt from his father in that and other posters such as He Talked...They Died (1943) part of the Careless Talk campaign. In addition to his poster work, Games completed a number of commissions for the War Artists' Advisory Committee.

Later in the War, Churchill ordered a poster Games had produced to be taken off the wall of the Poster Design in Wartime Britain exhibition at Harrods in 1943. The Army Bureau of Current Affairs, ABCA, had commissioned Games and Frank Newbould to produce posters for a series entitled Your Britain - Fight for It Now. While Newbould produced rural images similar to the pre-war travel posters he had created for several railway companies, Games presented a set of three Modernist buildings that had been built to address poverty, disease and deprivation. The poster that annoyed Churchill most featured the Berthold Lubetkin designed Finsbury Health Centre superseding a ruined building with a child suffering from rickets. Churchill considered this nothing short of a libel on the conditions in British cities and ordered the poster to be removed. Ernest Bevin, the war-time Minister of Labour, had another poster in the series removed from the Poster Design in Wartime Britain exhibition organised by the Association of International Artists.

== Later career ==
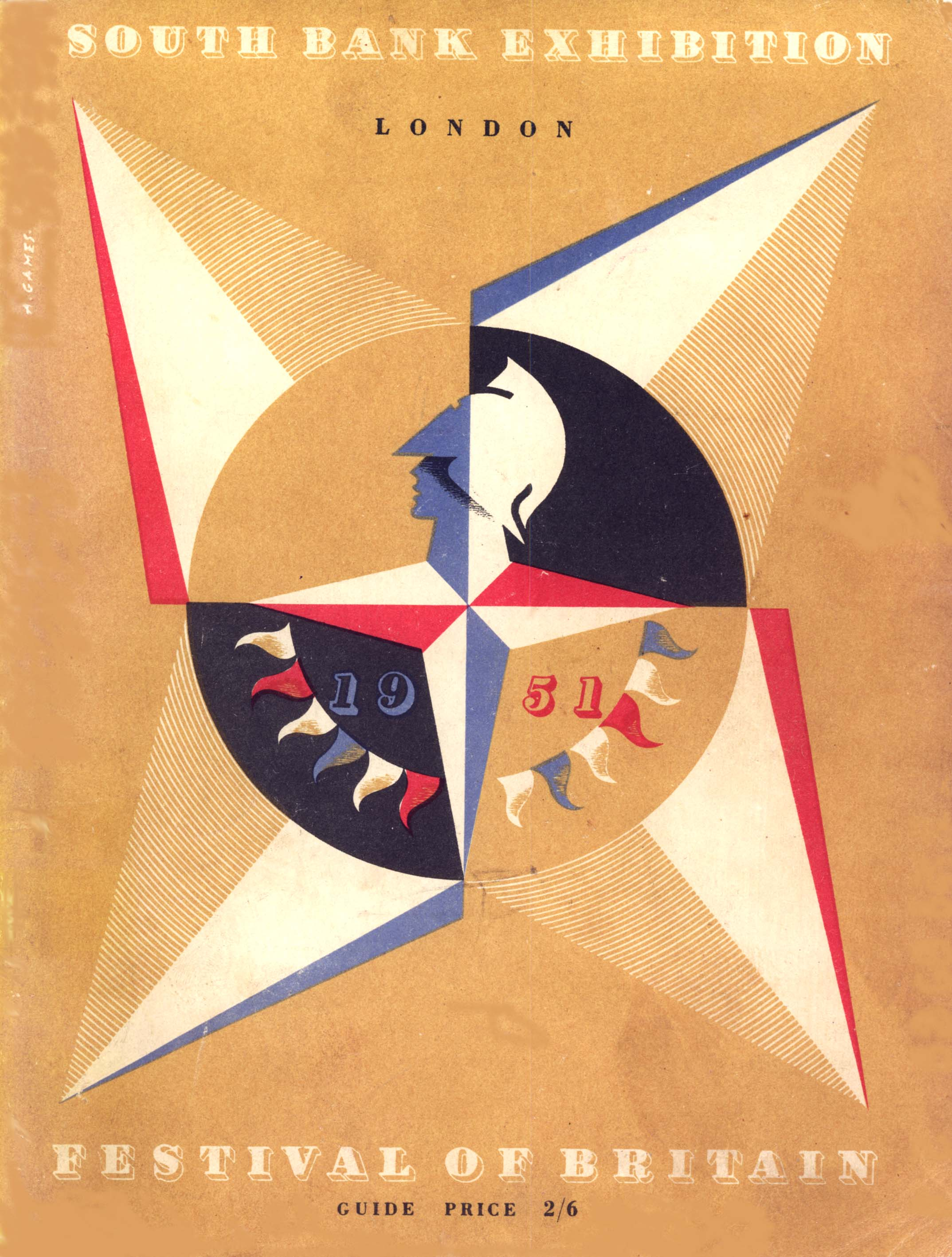
The Festival of Britain emblem – the Festival Star – designed by Abram Games, from the cover of the South Bank Exhibition Guide, 1951

In 1946, Games resumed his freelance practice and worked for clients such as Royal Dutch Shell, the Financial Times, Guinness, British Airways, London Transport and El Al. He designed stamps for Britain, Ireland, Israel, Jersey and Portugal. Also, he designed the logo for the JFS school. There were also book jackets for Penguin Books and logos for the 1951 Festival of Britain (winning the 1948 competition) and for the 1965 Queen's Award to Industry. Among his pioneering contributions was, in 1954, the first moving on-screen symbol of BBC Television. He also produced murals. Between 1946 and 1953, Games was a visiting lecturer in graphic design at London's Royal College of Art and in 1958, was awarded the OBE for services to graphic design. In 1959, he was appointed a Royal Designer for Industry (RDI). He also designed the tile motif of a swan on the Victoria line platforms at Stockwell tube station in the late 1960s.

Games had been among the first in Britain to see evidence of the atrocities committed at the Bergen-Belsen concentration camp, when photographs taken there by British troops arrived at the War Office in 1945. The same year he produced a poster, Give Clothing for Liberated Jewry, and would often work to support Jewish and Israeli organisations. Games, who was Jewish, spent some time in Israel in the 1950s where, among other activities, he designed stamps for the Israeli Post Office, including for the 1953 Conquest of the Desert exhibition and taught a course in postage-stamp design. He also designed covers for The Jewish Chronicle and prayer book prints for the Reform Synagogues of Great Britain. In 1960, Games designed the poster known as Freedom from Hunger for the Food and Agriculture Organization of the United Nations.

Games was also an industrial designer of sorts. Activities in this discipline included the design of the 1947 Cona vacuum coffee maker (produced from 1949, reworked in 1959 and still in production) and inventions such as a circular vacuum cleaner and an early 1960s portable handheld duplicating machine by Gestetner, which was not put into production due to the demise of mimeography.

In arriving at a poster design, Games would render up to 30 small preliminary sketches and then combine two or three into the final one. In the developmental process, he would work small because, he asserted, if poster designs "don't work an inch high, they will never work." He would also call on a large number of photographic images as source material. Purportedly, if a client rejected a proposed design (which seldom occurred), Games would resign and suggest that the client commission someone else.

In 2013, the National Army Museum, London, acquired a collection of his posters, each signed by Games and in mint condition.

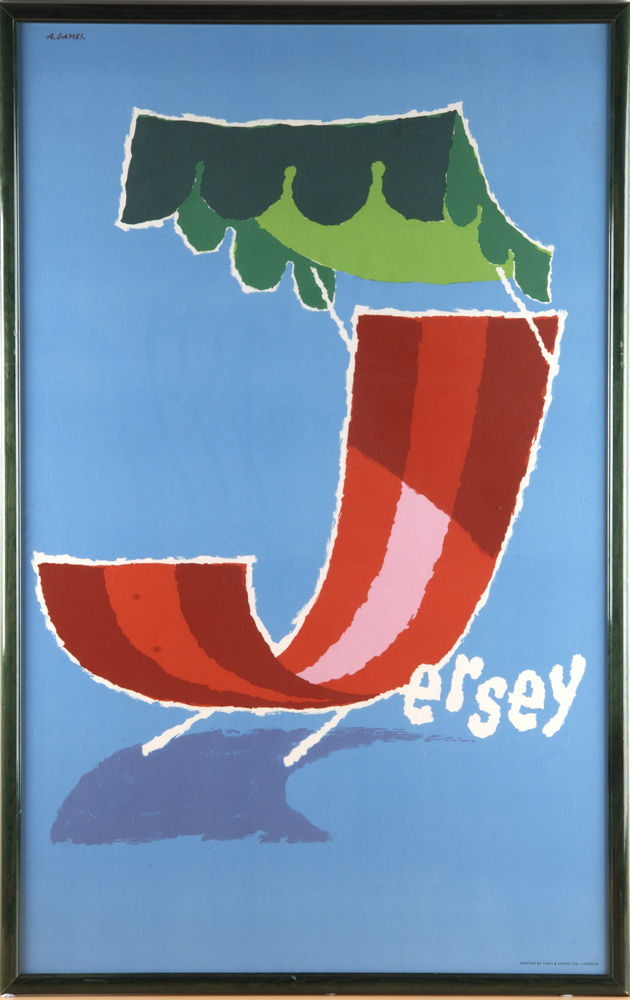
Poster by Games advertising tourism for the island of Jersey.

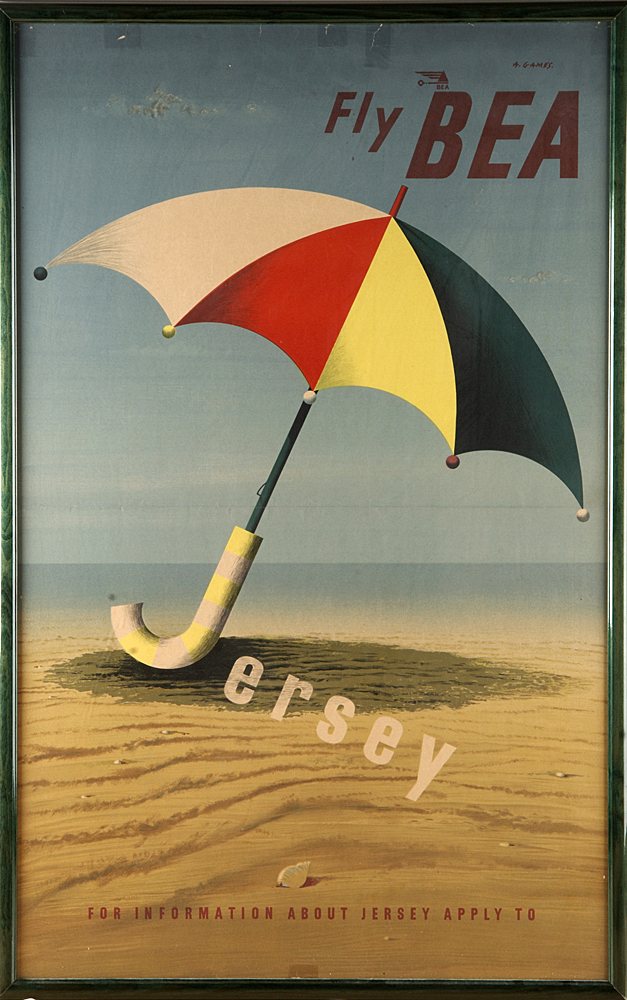
British European Airways advertising poster by Games.

== Personal life ==
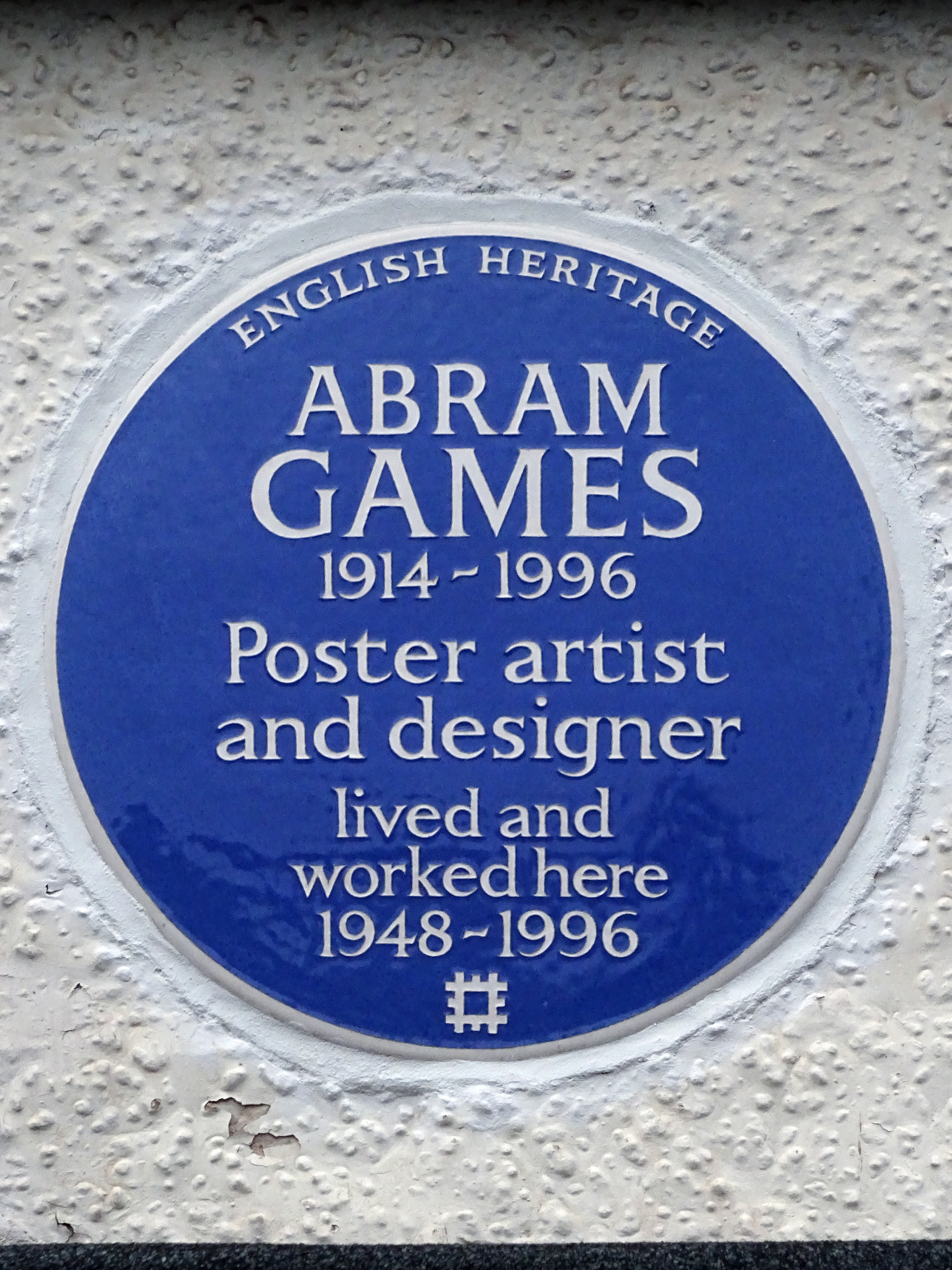
Blue plaque, 41 The Vale, Golders Green, London NW11

In October 1945, Games married Marianne Salfeld, the daughter of German orthodox Jewish émigrés, and initially lived with her father in Surbiton, Surrey. In 1948, they moved to Golders Green in North London, and lived in the same house until their deaths. They had three children, Naomi, Daniel and Sophie.

Marianne died in 1988; Games died in London on 27 August 1996.

== Exhibitions ==
- Abram Games, Graphic Designer (1914–1996): Maximum Meaning, Minimum Means, Design Museum, London, 2003
- Abram Games, Maximum Meaning, Minimum Means, The Minories, Colchester, 2011
- Designing the 20th Century: Life and Work of Abram Games, Jewish Museum London, 2014–2015
- Abram Games - Maximum Meaning Minimum Means, Dick Institute Kilmarnock, East Ayrshire, 2015
- The Art of Persuasion: War time posters by Abram Games, National Army Museum, London: 6 April-24 November 2019
