= University of Brighton Design Archives =

The University of Brighton Design Archives centres on British and global design organisations of the twentieth century. It is located within the University of Brighton Grand Parade campus in the heart of Brighton and is an international research resource. It has many archival collections that were generated by design institutions and individual designers

== History ==
The University of Brighton Design Archives has its origins in the deposit of the archive of the Design Council (formerly the Council of Industrial Design) in 1994. The organisation was restructured by recommendation of the 1993–94,"Future Design Council" report (also known as the Sorrell Report) and consequently its records needed to be relocated. Various repositories were considered and the University of Brighton was selected since it offered the newly established Design History Research Centre (DHRC) led by Professor Jonathan Woodham and Dr Patrick Maguire, who provided research expertise in the area of design and the state. In 1996 an award from the Getty Foundation Archive Program supported not only the acquisition of the Design Council Archive but also the appointment of a curator and a research officer.

== Collections development ==
The Design Archives has developed its collections since the 1990s and each archive has been acquired according to a specific collecting policy; to document aspects of twentieth-century design history with a strategic focus on the connections between them. Acquisitions have included the archives of James Gardner and FHK Henrion, who both worked with the Council of Industrial Design (later the Design Council) in the early parts of their career. Subsequent additions of individual designer's archives include those of Alison Settle a journalist and editor of British Vogue, and Council member in the 1950s; whose archive had been deposited in the university's library.

The archives of Bernard Schottlander, Paul Clark, and Barbara Jones, designers from different periods each having connections with the Design Council's work. Communication designers HA Rothholz, Edwin Embleton and Anthony Froshaug. Architects Joseph Emberton and Theo Crosby, and the display and set designer, Natasha Kroll.

The archive also holds a collection of papers reflecting all aspects of the work of engineer, designer and former senior project officer at the Design Council, WH Mayall.

The acquisition of the archive of the International Council of Graphic Design Associations (ICOGRADA) in 2002-3 marked the development of an international perspective for the collection. ICOGRADA is the professional world body for graphic design and visual communication, founded in London in 1963. The ICOGRADA archive comprises a significant body of documentation relating to governance, administration and educational activities, an important collection of 1500 posters from around the world, and library holdings. In 2007 the International Council of Societies of Industrial Design (ICSID) archive came to the University of Brighton and further extended the international reach of the Design Archives.

== Online access ==
Since 2005 the Design Archives has contributed catalogue data to the Archives Hub, a gateway to thousands of archives across more than 200 UK institutions. Records are added regularly as part of the Design Archives' ongoing cataloguing programme. Increasingly, digital objects are being added to these records.

Online access to the Design Archives' visual resources has been available in digital form since 1997–1998 with the JIDI: JISC Image Digitisation Initiative, which funded the digitisation of parts of the Design Council Photographic Library, including the 1951 Festival of Britain material. In 1999, the Archives participated in Scran (Scottish Cultural Resources Access Network), contributing images of exhibits at the 1947 Enterprise Scotland Exhibition. A further 3,000 images were added to the Visual Arts Data Service for free public access in 2001.

In 2000, the Design Archives developed a more structured e-learning resource, 'Designing Britain 1945–1975: The Visual Experience of Post-War Society'. A £132,000 grant from Jisc supported the creation of seven modules, each containing around 100 visual records and contextual texts by subject specialists.

The Design Archives was one of eleven image collections to take part in the JISC-funded 'Digital Images for Education' project, receiving £43,000 in funding, and delivering over 2,300 images from across the wealth of its holdings to this subscription-based service, launched in 2011. The key emphasis of this resource is on film and digital images that capture local history, UK history, and world history during the preceding 25 years. The Archives was also among nine Higher Education partners contributing data and expertise to the "Look Here!" Project, funded and led by the Visual Arts Data Service. In 2015 the Design Archives won funding from the Arts and Humanities Research Council for the project Exploring British Design, a prototype web portal to connect information about British design held in different museums, archives and libraries.

== Recent recognition ==
In 2009 the Design Archives team was expanded as a result of further investment by the University of Brighton.

In recognition of its national and international role in higher education, the Design Archives received a 3-year Higher Education Funding Council for England (HEFCE) grant of £180,000 in 2010. The award followed a review of university museums and galleries, led by Sir Muir Russell, which resulted in HEFCE widening its definition of university collections eligible for support. In 2017, the Design Archives successfully reapplied for funding from this competitive source for the next four years.

The Design Archives now form part of a group of 33 university museum, galleries and collections to receive this direct support. The industry publication Design Week named the Design Archives as one of the five key design research collections in the UK.

In October 2018, it was announced that the University of Brighton Design Archives had been awarded the prestigious Sir Misha Black Award for Innovation in Design Education. In his oration, Professor Sir Christopher Frayling said the award was "primarily, for their pioneering work since the early 2000s in the areas of access and digitisation — engaging their various publics, specialist and non-specialist — in both processes and content, and putting the Brighton Design Archives at the forefront of debate about the very nature and significance of archival work today."

== Exhibitions ==
The Design Archives initiates exhibitions and contributes to exhibitions at other institutions. Some examples include:

- 1999 – Ministry of Taste exhibition at Cornerhouse, Manchester, then firstsite, Colchester and Virgin Atlantic, Heathrow. The exhibition showed colour product photography from the Design Council Archive.
- 2000 – Artist in Residence Project funded by the Arts Council, South East Arts, Brighton & Hove Council, University of Brighton. Nine-month residency by artists Marysia Lewandowska and Neil Cummings, who produced research and student projects leading to the exhibition 'Documents: Adrift in Taste’, University of Brighton Gallery, 2–22 December 2000.
- 2004 – The Design Archives co-ordinated research in Britain for the exhibition and publication The Ecstasy of Things, for the Fotomuseum Winterthur, Switzerland.
- 2004 - Airworld – Design and Architecture for Air Travel, 7 May – 14 November, Vitra Design Museum, Weil am Rhein then on tour to Vitra Museum, Berlin and other venues. The Design Archives loaned material from the FHK Henrion Archive.
- 2006 - Brighton Photo Biennial: collaboration between the Design Archives and Gabriel Kuri, as selected for the Design Centre, London
- 2007 - Indoors and Out: The Sculpture and Design of Bernard Schottlander exhibition at the University of Brighton, and at the Henry Moore Institute, Leeds.
- 2008 – Designs for Solidarity: Photography and the Cuban Political Poster 1965–1975, an exhibition for the Brighton Photo Biennial.
- 2010 - The House of Vernacular, Brighton Photo Biennial, 2 October – 28 November. Images from the Design Archives were selected by Martin Parr for inclusion in this exhibition.
- 2011 – Festival of Britain 50th Anniversary Exhibition, Royal Festival Hall, London.
- 2013 - Black Eyes & Lemonade: Curating Popular Art, 9 March – 1 September 2013. Whitechapel Gallery. A collaboration with the National Museum of Folklore and the Whitechapel Gallery, the exhibition included items from the Barbara Jones Archive, the F H K Henrion Archive, the James Gardner Archive, and the Design Council Archive.
- 2015 - History Is Now: 7 Artists Take On Britain, 10 February - 26 April 2015. Hayward Gallery.
- 2015 - Joseph Emberton: the architecture of display 2015, 18 February - 17 May 2015. Pallant House.

== Publications ==
- Woodham, Jonathan M (1995). ‘Redesigning a Chapter in the History of British Design: The Design Council Archive at the University of Brighton.’ Journal of Design History 8 (3): pp. 225–229.
- Maguire, P. J. and J. M. Woodham (1997). Design and Cultural Politics in post-war Britain: The "Britain can make it" exhibition of 1946. London; Washington: Leicester University Press.
- Moriarty, Catherine and Paul Bayley (2000). Ministry of Taste: Images from the Design Council Archive. Manchester: Cornerhouse Publications, 12 p. Essay published to accompany the exhibition of the same name at Cornerhouse Manchester, 1999.
- Moriarty, Catherine (2000). "A Back Room Service? The Council of Industrial Design Photographic Library 1945 -1965." Journal of Design History 13 (1): pp. 39–57.
- Woodham, Jonathan M (2004). ‘The Design Archive at Brighton: serendipity and strategy.’ Art libraries journal 29 (3): pp. 15–21.
- Moriarty, Catherine (2005). "Design and Photography" in R. Lenman, ed., The Oxford Companion to the Photograph. Oxford University Press, p. 306.
- Whitworth, Lesley (2005). "Inscribing design on the nation: the creators of the British Council of Industrial Design." Business and Economic History Online 3: pp. 1–14.
- Moriarty, Catherine (2007). “Bernard Schottlander’s industrial design as a system of appearances” in Indoors and Out: the sculpture and design of Bernard Schottlander. Leeds: Henry Moore Institute.
- Whitworth, Lesley (2007). 'The Housewives' Committee of the Council of Industrial Design: a brief episode of domestic reconnoitring', in Elizabeth Darling and Lesley Whitworth (eds), Women and the Making of Built Space in England, 1870–1950. Aldershot and Burlington: Ashgate, pp. 180–196.
- Whitworth, Lesley (2008). “The Design Archives at the University of Brighton: A resource for business historians.” Business Archives: Sources and History 96 (November): pp. 69–82.
- Whitworth, Lesley (2009) Promoting product quality: the Co-op and the Council of Industrial Design In: Black, Lawrence and Robertson, Nicole, eds. Consumerism and the Co-operative movement in modern British history: Taking stock. Manchester: Manchester University Press, pp. 174–196.
- Woodham, Jonathan; Lyon, Philippa, eds. (2009). ‘Art and Design at Brighton 1859–2009: from Arts and Manufactures to the Creative and Cultural Industries. Brighton: University of Brighton.
- Breakell, Sue (2010). "Evolving archival interfaces and the University of Brighton Design Archives." Art Libraries Journal 35 (4): pp. 12–17.
- Breakell, Sue and Whitworth, Lesley (2013). "Émigré Designers in the University of Brighton Design Archives", Journal of Design History, first published online 4 March 2013 doi:10.1093/jdh/ept006.
- Moriarty, Catherine (2011). "From Archive to Retroscope: pushing forward resource integration." ISEA 17th International Symposium on Electronic Art, Istanbul, September 2011.
- Whitworth, Lesley (2012) Collective responsibility: the public and the (UK) Council of Industrial Design in the 1940s In: Edquist, Harriet and Vaughan, Laurene, eds. The design collective: an approach to practice. Cambridge Scholars, pp. 164–181.
