= Natasha Kroll =

Production designer (1914–2004)

Natasha Kroll (1914–2004) was a display and production designer born in Moscow, who moved to Germany with her family in 1922. Most widely known for her production design at the BBC in the late 1950s and early 1960s, Kroll went on to design several feature films.

Her archive is held at the University of Brighton Design Archives.

== Education ==
Kroll attended the renowned Reimann School in Berlin specialising in display design, and joined the staff as an assistant teacher when the school moved to London in 1936.

== Career ==
=== Shop display ===
Kroll established her career as a window display designer. Some of her early commissions included Rowntree's department stores in York and Scarborough.

In 1942 Kroll was appointed to the position of display manager for the large retail store Simpson (Piccadilly) Ltd. Her pioneering approach and her display philosophy, with its roots in European modernism, complemented the innovative new premises designed by Joseph Emberton. Kroll stayed at Simpsons twelve years, working her way up from the role of display manager to taking full responsibility for all the store's design, publicity and display work. During this time she recruited illustrator André François and gave Terence Conran his first display commission.

Kroll was also involved in the design of the interior of the restaurant "Sugar and Spice", which opened in Dunstable in 1966, and was owned by J Lyons & Co.

=== Exhibition design ===
Natasha Kroll was also involved in the display design of the following exhibitions:

- Lion and Unicorn Pavilion at The Festival of Britain, 1951
- Finmar Exhibition at the Tea Centre, 1960
- Milan Triennale, 1964

=== Production design ===
In 1956 Kroll joined the production design department of the BBC. As a member of the design department under Richard Levin, Kroll devised innovative settings for factual programmes and talks. As with her window displays, ideas originating from European modernism and contemporary design were given popular exposure. Of particular note is the studio design she devised for Huw Weldon's ground-breaking arts programme Monitor.

Kroll left the BBC to go freelance in 1966, specialising in period dramas. These included Mary Queen of Scots (1969) and Love's Labour's Lost (1975).

Kroll gained several feature film credits as a production designer, including:

- Macbeth (1970)
- The Music Lovers (1971)
- The Hireling (1973)
- Age of Innocence (1977)
- Absolution (1978) (producer and production designer)

== Bibliography ==
- The Princess and the Pea, Collins, 1944, OCLC: 179198949
- Window Display, Studio Publications, 1954, ASIN: B0006D85XA

== Awards ==
Natasha Kroll was elected to the Faculty of Royal Designers for Industry in 1966. This award from the Royal Society of Arts recognized both spheres of Kroll's work.

In 1974 Kroll won the BAFTA for Best Art Direction for The Hireling (1973).
