= Paul Clark (designer) =

Paul Birkett Clark
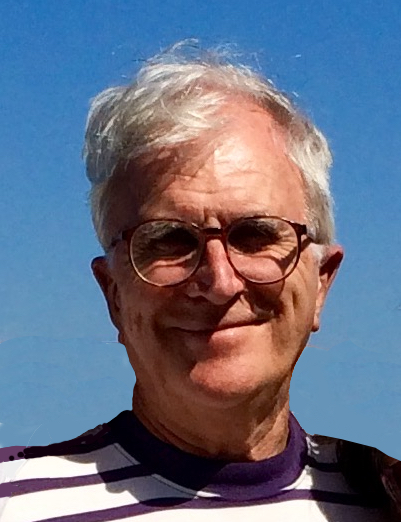
- Paul Clark in 2017
- Born: 17 August 1940; Whitstable, England
- Occupations: Designer, Writer and Model Maker
- Known for: Pop products and Model Rocketry

Paul B. Clark (born 1940) is a designer, design historian, model rocketeer and curator whose designs established his reputation with the birth of British pop culture in the 1960s. By printing silk-screened Pop decoration onto cheap, mass-produced products, Clark was among a group of young designers who undermined accepted ideas of good taste, by elevating everyday items into fashionable objects. Clark's interest in science and space travel led him to create model rockets for international competitions as well as commercial model rocket kits. He is the founder of the British Space Modelling Association.

His archive is located at the University of Brighton Design Archives.

== Education ==
Paul Clark was educated at Merchant Taylors' School, Northwood from 1954 to 1958. Following a two-year intermediate art course at Hammersmith College of Art, London (1959-1961), Clark joined the Central School of Arts and Crafts where he began an Industrial Design NDD course. In 1984 Clark graduated with an MA in Cultural Studies from the Royal College of Art.

== Career ==
=== Early career ===
Clark began his career assisting ceramic designer Michel Caddy in his studio whilst a student at Central School of Arts and Crafts on the Industrial Design course. There he was involved in graphic design and also gained experience designing various of 3D materials and ceramics. In 1962 he decided not to return to Central School of Arts and Crafts, instead establishing himself as a freelance graphic designer and a maker of accessories for the kitchen. There was a revival of interest in Victorian and Edwardian style and one of his first products was a range of knob stoppered storage jars. Also at this time, Clark developed an interest in Letraset, designing and applying for a provisional patent on his own display lettering system.

=== The 1960s ===
As a Pop designer in the swinging London era, Clark's work was particularly popular in the boutiques of London's Carnaby Street such as Gear. He also supplied Kleptomania in Kingly Street, which was run by Tommy Roberts who later opened the famous Mr Freedom in the Kings Road.

In 1965, David Phillips, the China & Glass buyer Woollands of Knightsbridge - the London department store - held a British Fortnight promotion and commissioned designs from Clark and other designers from the era. This led to Clark's iconic Union Jack mug for which he is most well known. For the opening reception he devised a novelty handout called 'Instant Patriot Outfit'. This was a small gold foil folder with a folded Union Jack inside it, with the slogan 'Be British' printed on it. It was subsequently given to guests at the opening event of the British Pavilion at the 1967 Worlds Fair in Montreal. Woollands closed in 1967 and David Phillips went on to become Terence Conran's chief buyer at Habitat

Clark was aware of the work of the upcoming young Pop artists and was particularly influenced by issue 32 of the Royal College of Art's magazine 'Ark'. This included a 'Kit of Images' with an actual card target and he subsequently used the target motif in his designs for mugs, dishes and coasters. A dynamic symbol of the era, it was originally derived from American artist Jasper Johns' series of target paintings, and developed by Peter Blake in the early 1960s. Along with the Union Jack, the target symbol fitted well with the mid-sixties trend for design derived from Op art and hard edged abstraction. Typography also featured strongly in Clark's designs for mugs, dishes and clocks. By 1968, Clark was known as "the pop clock man".

=== Perspective Designs ===
In 1966, Clark became the design consultant at Perspective Designs, a company set up by Philip Bidwell specifically to market the work of young British designers. They made kitchen accessories, stationery, gifts and fibre-board furniture items that were very much part of British Pop Art culture. They took over the manufacture and distribution of his mugs and dishes Perspective Designs had a retail outlet in the Fulham Road called 'Scope' which doubled as a showroom. Clark stayed with Perspective Designs until they went into liquidation in 1969. His design work at this time included the 'Disc Clock', the 'Revolutionary Clock' and a range of cheap, colourful cardboard clocks.

=== Ben Bowden's 'Bicycle of the Future' ===
In 1986, Clark created a replica of an iconic bike designed by Ben Bowden which had been exhibited at the Britain Can Make It exhibition in 1947. Guided only by photos, Clark recreated Bowden's revolutionary bike for the Royal College of Art's Make or Break exhibition, curated by Dr Penny Sparke.

== Teaching ==
Continuing his freelance graphic work, Clark began teaching on the Foundation and Graphic Design courses at the Brighton Polytechnic (now University of Brighton) on a part-time basis. He taught in both the Graphic Design Department and on the Foundation Course (Department of Three Dimensional Design), with the latter role becoming full-time in 1975.

In 1984 Clark returned to Brighton to teach in the Department of Art and Design History after completing his MA in Cultural Studies at the Royal College of Art. While at Brighton, Clark joined the CTI Art and Design unit, where he edited the journal OutLine and in 2000 he helped establish the Learning and Teaching Support Network (LTSN) Art Design and Communication Subject Centre.

== Exhibitions ==
Clark's work has been exhibited at the following exhibitions:

- 1978 Alphabet Allsorts (curator) at Brighton Polytechnic Gallery
- 1981 Robots and Space Toys at Brighton Polytechnic Gallery (curated with Chris McEwan)
- 1983 Out of This World at Brighton Museum
- 1986 Make or Break at the Royal College of Art
- 2001 Les Années Pop 1956-1968 at the Centre Pompidou
- 2004 You Never Know When You Might Need Them at University of Brighton Gallery
- 2005 Tin Toys at the University of Brighton Gallery (curator)
- 2012 Pop! Design Culture Fashion exhibition at the Fashion & Textile Museum, London

== Bibliography ==
- Bakelite-Materiale per mille usi, Perree, Rob (contributor Clark, P.), Leonardo De Luca, 1991, ISBN 8878133833
- Ben Bowden's 'Bicycle of the Future', 1946, Clark, P., Journal of Design History, Vol. 5, No. 3 (1992), pp. 227–235
- The Phone (Design Icons), Clark, P., Aurum Press Ltd, 1997, ISBN 1854105299
- The Watch (Design Icons), Clark, P. and Ryecart, G., Aurum Press Ltd, 1999, ISBN 1854105981
- Design (A Crash Course), Clark, P. and Freeman, J., Watson-Guptill Publications, 2000, ISBN 0823009831
- Things that Go Boom or Fly, Float, and Zoom!, Alan Bridgewater; Gill Bridgewater et al. (contributor Clark, P.), 2009, St Martin's Griffin, ISBN 1907332049
