= W H Mayall =

W. H. (William Henry) Mayall CEng, AFRAeS (1923–1998) was an engineer and designer. He is also noted for his theories about design, about which he wrote and lectured extensively. As the development of design methodology emerged in the 1960s, Mayall became one of the first to emphasise the relevance of industrial design and the importance of design in technology.

His archive is located at the University of Brighton Design Archives.

== Career ==
=== Early career ===
Mayall began his engineering career as a technical assistant for Heenan and Froude Ltd in their experimental department. He continued to work on experimental mechanical projects when he moved to Flight Refuelling Ltd.

In 1947, Mayall joined Tiltman Langley Laboratories Ltd. based at Redhill Aerodrome, undertaking mechanical research and development work. It was in this role that Mayall became concerned with broadening the function of engineering design.

=== Council of Industrial Design ===
In 1959 Mayall moved to the Council of Industrial Design where he was responsible for encouraging improvements to capital goods. Mayall wrote articles and books, liaised with industry and mounted conferences and exhibitions such as More Value by Design. He presented papers at a variety of engineering conferences around the world, both on the design task, and role of the industrial designer in that task.

Mayall was struck by the contrast between the practice of engineering and design and the 'design establishment', finding the latter to be elitist and divisive.

He went on to become Senior Projects Officer at the renamed Design Council.

=== Design Promotion Projects ===
Mayall retired from the Design Council in 1979, and under the name of Design Promotion Projects, he undertook independent design education and exhibition work. He also continued to write about his frustrations with the Design Council's approach to certain task, alongside his alternative vision for it.

== Design Theory ==
=== Machines and Perception in Industrial Design ===
In his role as senior industrial officer for capital goods at the Council of Industrial Design, Mayall argued for early consideration of ergonomics and industrial design in product development. In his 1968 book Machines and Perception in Industrial Design, Mayall identified the dangers and difficulties created for machine operators by the increasing complexity of modern machines and examined the development of the "machine aesthetic" against social, technical and marketing factors. He also believed that organizing machines into coherent visual fields would help prevent accidents.

=== More Value by Design ===
The More Value by Design conferences organized by Mayall, were intended to provide a forum for senior engineers to review the whole process of design in engineering from its fundamental aspects. "Firstly, the engineering industries must do much more homework, particularly at a management level, to achieve more value by design," he said.

=== Principles in Design ===
Mayall’s ten principles in design (Principles in Design (1979)) have been cited as an unofficial design canon and continue to be used in discussions of contemporary design. Mayall’s ten principles are totality, time, value, resources, synthesis, iteration, change, relationships, competence and service.

=== Role of the Designer ===
Mayall also believed that the designer was part of the change process; the ‘mastermind; that can initiate change with the type of products created.

== Accreditation ==
Mayall was a chartered engineer (CEng) and an Associate Fellow of the Royal Aeronautical Society (AFRAeS).

== Bibliography ==
- Industrial Design for Engineers, London: Iliffe Books, 1967, ISBN 978-0592042053
- Machines and Perception in Industrial Design, London: Studio Vista, 1968, ISBN 978-0289279168
- More Value by Design, London: Council for Industrial Design, 1971
- Principles in Design, London: Design Council, 1979, ISBN 978-0442262662
- The Challenge of the Chip, London: HMSO/Science Museum, 1980
- Design Matters, London: Design Council, 1985, ISBN 978-0850721614
