= Festival Star =

Graphic symbol for 1951 Festival of Britain

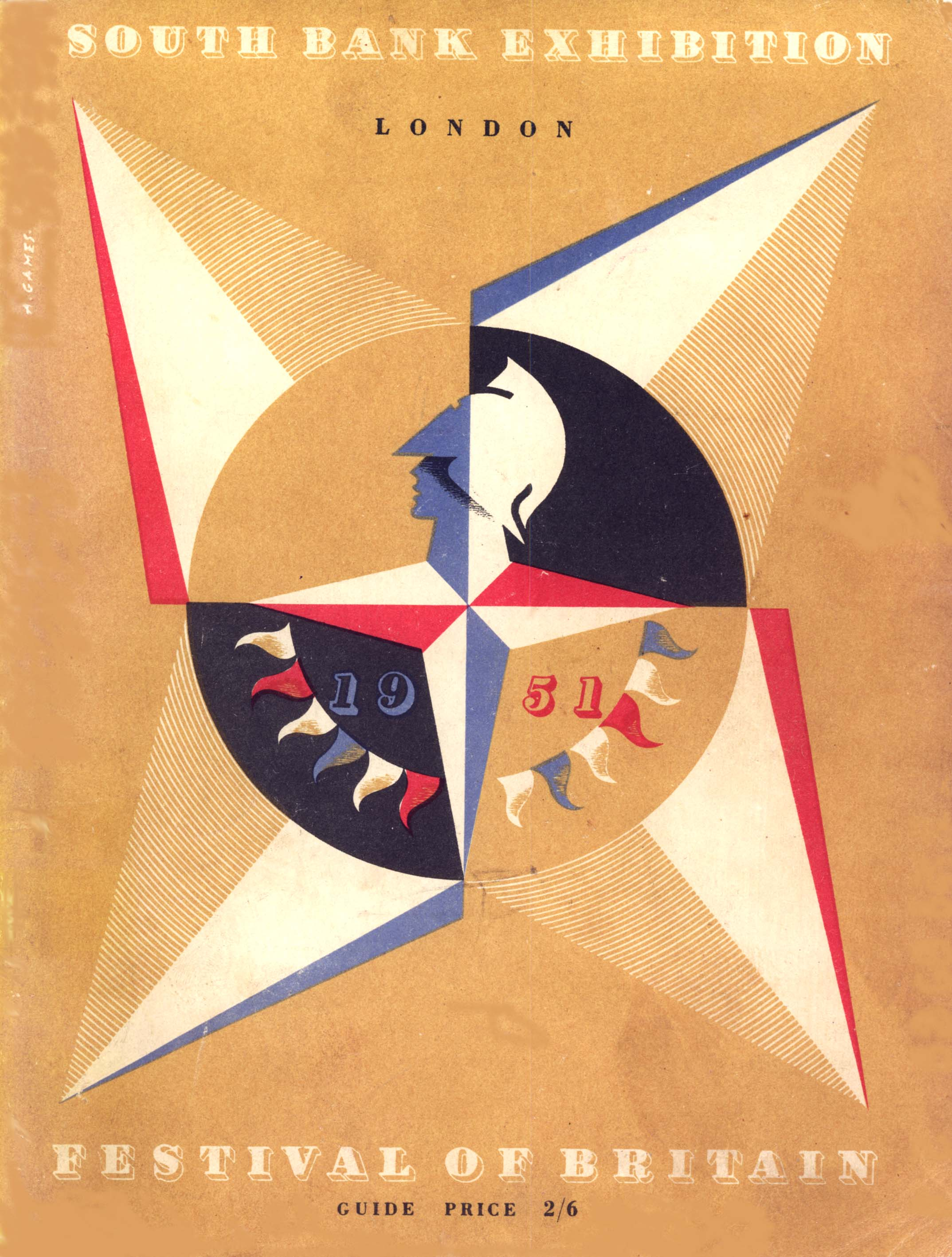
The Festival of Britain emblem, designed by Abram Games, from the cover of the South Bank Exhibition Guide, 1951

The Festival Star was the graphic symbol designed by Abram Games for the 1951 Festival of Britain. Games was one of 12 artists invited to submit designs to the Arts Council and the Council of Industrial Design in 1948, and won the limited competition. The brief requested a design reflecting a "summer of gaiety and good looks"

The logo (which Games called an emblem) uses the traditional red, white and blue colours of the Union Flag. The main device incorporates a profile of Britannia's head, with crested helmet, on the "north" point of a four-pointed compass rose. Games added a row of bunting flags to his first design concept when asked to make it more festive. The anticlockwise halves of each compass point are coloured, with the clockwise halves white: the "east" and "west" points are red and white, and the "north" and "south" points (including Britannia's head) are blue and white. The figures "19" in blue and "51" in red appear in the lower left (SW) and right (SE) quadrants, with quarter circles of bunting below connecting the "south" compass point to the "east" and "west" points, with six flags either side of the "south" point and a pattern of four flags (white, red, white, blue) repeated three times. A version used on official publications places the logo on a background quartered in a background colour and black, surrounded by four additional compass points.

The logo adorned many official publications and souvenirs including beer mats, paper napkins, egg cups, brass pokers and plastic cocktail sticks. It was also used on village signs erected in every village in Bedfordshire by the county council.

Games also designed a London Transport poster for the exhibition, based on his logo, with the two-dimensional compass rose converted into a depiction of a three-dimensional structure with four points, resembling a signpost or weather vane, and Britannia's head replaced by the London Transport roundel.

The logo continues to see use today in advertisements concerning the South Bank area of London.

== Three-dimensional street hanging ==
A large, 40 feet (12 m) three-dimensional Festival Star was also made and hung over Northumberland Street, London as a focal point for the celebrations. The four-pointed star was made by Essex Aero from 763 square feet (70.9 m^{2}) of lightweight magnesium sheeting, weighing in at only 1,790 pounds (810 kg).
