= Jack Beddington =

British advertising executive

- Beddington in 1938
- Born: John Louis Beddington; 1893; London, England
- Died: 1959 (aged 65–66)
- Occupation: Advertising Executive

John Louis Beddington CBE (1893–1959) was a United Kingdom advertising executive, best known for his work as publicity director for Shell in the 1930s and as head of the Ministry of Information Films Division during World War II.

== Biography ==
=== Early life ===
Jack Beddington was born in South Kensington, London in 1893 to Charles Lindsay Beddington and Stella Goldschmidt de Libantia. He was educated at Wellington College and Balliol College, Oxford.

During World War I he served with the King's Own Yorkshire Light Infantry. He was wounded at Ypres. In January 1918 he married Olivia Margaret Streatfeild.

=== Shell-Mex and BP ===
After a period working for the Asiatic Petroleum Company in Shanghai, Beddington became publicity manager for Shell UK in 1928. During the 1930s, Beddington worked as assistant general manager and director of publicity for Shell-Mex & BP, a joint marketing venture started in 1932 between Shell and BP. He employed a number of artists such as Paul Nash, John Piper, James Gardner and Graham Sutherland to produce artwork for Shell.

During this time, he spent a significant amount of money on producing films through the Shell Film Unit, on various topics. This unit was established by Edgar Anstey in 1934 as a result of a report written by documentary film-maker John Grierson about how Shell could make better use of film publicity. Rather than being direct advertising, the films produced served to promote a more positive image of Shell as existing for the public good rather than merely for profit. He also established, with John Betjeman, the 'Shell Guides' to English counties.

=== Second World War ===
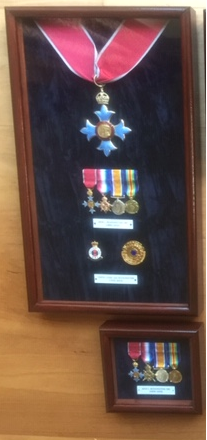
From the left CBE; 1914/15 Star; British War Medal (General Service); Victory Medal. 3rd row Jack's daughter (Carol) Bletchley Park medals: Bletchley Park Veterans Medal; Bletchley Park and its Outstations 1939-45 Medal.

In April 1940, Beddington was appointed director of the Ministry of Information Films Division, replacing Kenneth Clark. He remained in this post until 1946.

In August 1940, he renamed the GPO Film Unit as the Crown Film Unit, with Ian Dalrymple as its head. This unit focused on the production of documentary films, which Beddington supported even in the face of opposition from the Select Committee on National Expenditure. Almost three-quarters of all films produced or commissioned by the Films Division between 1940 and 1945 were written, directed or produced by members of the documentary film movement, a group of film-makers brought together by John Grierson. Although many of these documentaries were for non-theatrical distribution, under Beddington's tenure, the Crown Film Unit produced such feature-length documentaries as Target for Tonight, Desert Victory and Western Approaches.

After the war, Beddington and Barnett Freedman helped launch the Lyons' Lithograph series. In 1957 he selected a series of 120 'Young Artists of Promise' for a book illustrating their work.

Jack Beddington’s medals to the right include the miniatures of the same below. The large blue neck decoration is the CBE – Commander of the Most Excellent Order of the British Empire awarded in 1943 for services to the war effort as a civilian. In the 3rd row of the top case are Carol Lobb’s (nee Beddington) WWII medals from serving as a code breaker at Bletchley Park. She was the daughter of Jack and Olivia.
