= Bernard Schottlander =

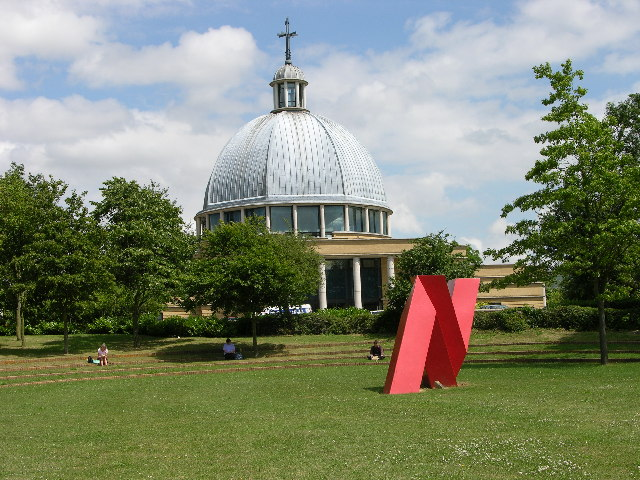
Work by Schottlander in Milton Keynes

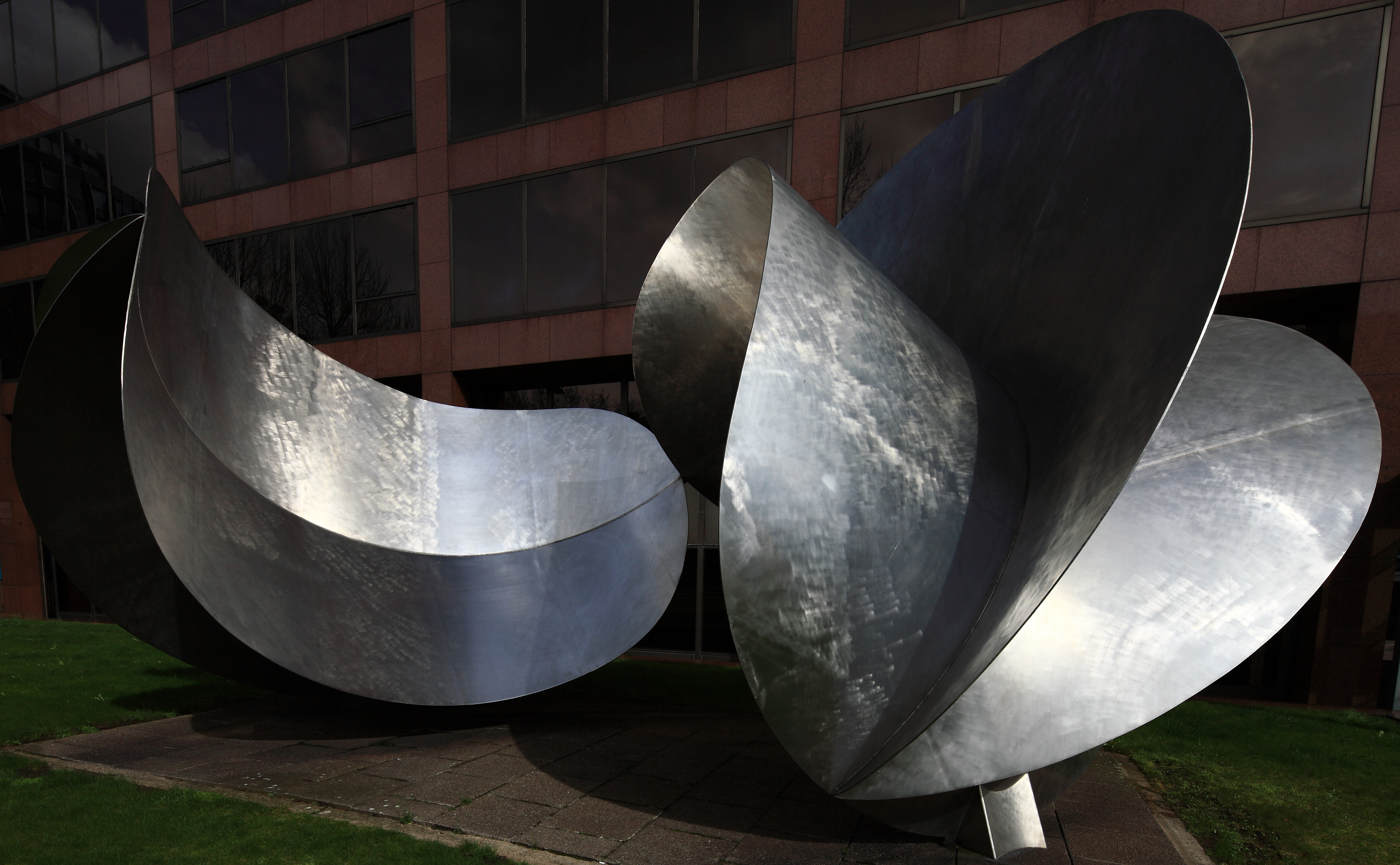
South of the River (1976)

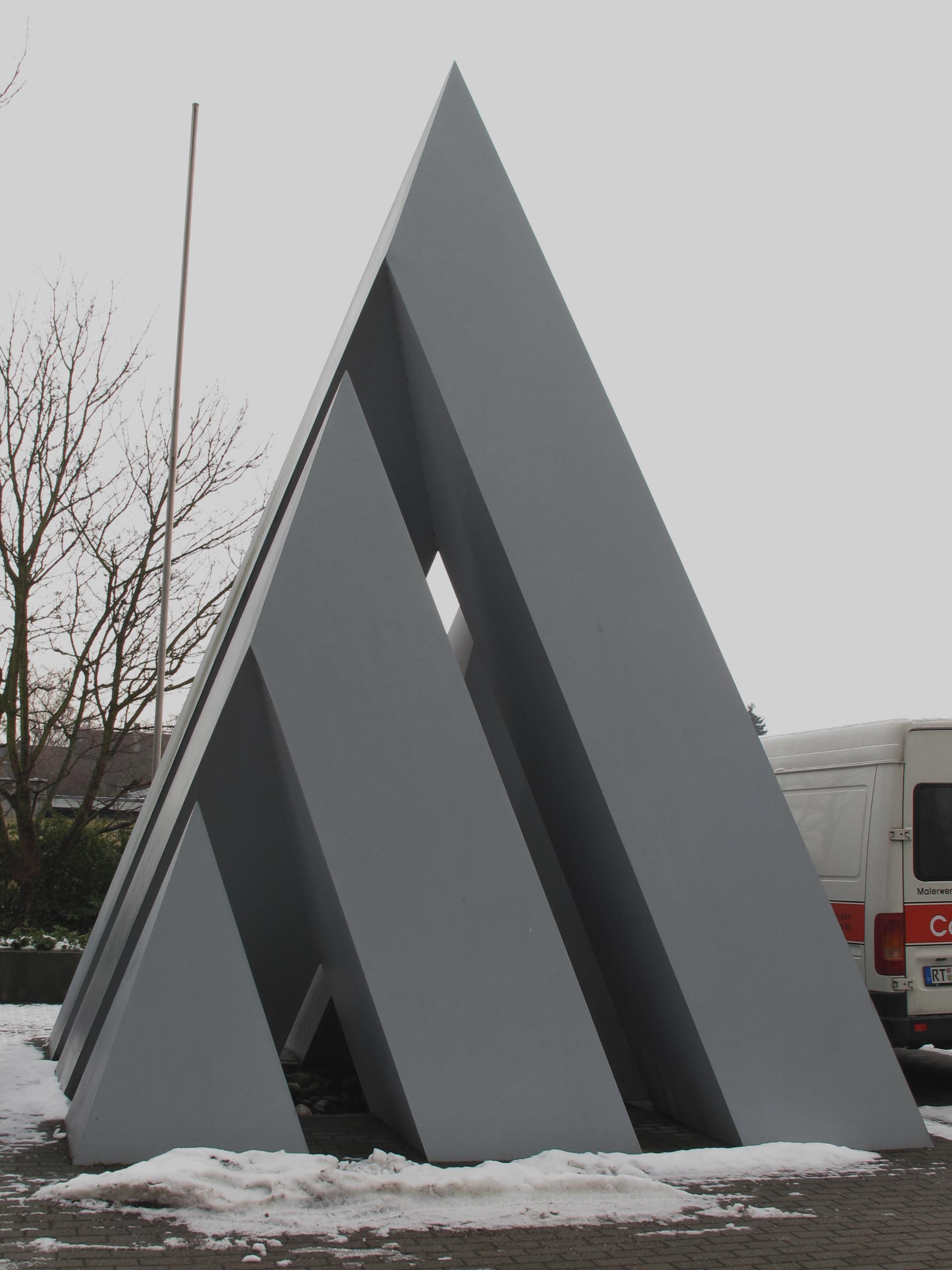
Pyramid in Tübingen (1976)

Bernard Schottlander (1924–1999) was a British, German-born designer and sculptor. His archive is located at the University of Brighton Design Archives.

== Life ==
Bernard Schottlander was born in Mainz, Germany in 1924 and came as a Jewish refugee to Leeds in 1939. During the war he worked in a factory as a welder, before taking a course in Sculpture at Leeds College of Art and subsequently – with the help of a bursary – at the Anglo-French art centre in St John’s Wood. He studied sculpture for a year in London, and his training as a welder influenced his work heavily. Bernard Schottlander described himself as a designer for interiors and a sculptor for exteriors.

He opened a studio in North London with his assistant George Nash, who had himself learned his craft in the Royal Air Force’s workshops. Their work at this stage was essentially artistic in nature, seeking to explore new forms and each piece was handmade in strictly limited editions.

In 1963 he decided to concentrate solely on sculpture and from 1965 he taught metalwork at St Martins School. In the same year he was part of the group show Six Artists at the Institute of Contemporary Arts in London and in the following year (1966) had his first solo show at the Hamilton Galleries, London.

Sculpture is the art of silence, of objects that must speak for themselves

== The Mantis ==
An admirer of Alexander Calder, in 1951 Schottlander created the "Mantis" series of lamp.

"As both an industrial designer and sculptor, the two professions were for Schottlander interconnected. As Victoria Worsley has demonstrated, Schottlander was concerned with similar formal problems in his sculptures and designs. His designs for lamps created sleek sculptural forms and customizable functionality"

== Publication ==
- Indoors and Out (No. 56): The Sculpture and Design of Bernard Schottlander. The Henry Moore Foundation, Leeds 2007

== Works (selection) ==
- Toronto : November Pyramid (1967) in High Park
- London : South of the River (1976) at Becket House, Lambeth Palace Road
- Warwick : 3B Series I (1968) outside the Rootes Building, University of Warwick
- Milton Keynes : 3B Series No.2, 3B Series No.6 and 2MS Series No.4 (1968–70), Public Gardens
- Tübingen : Pyramid (BS-76) (1976), Konrad-Adenauerstraße
- Manchester : Untitled and Terminal (1964) outside the Whitworth, The University of Manchester, Oxford Road
