= Festival of Britain =

1951 national exhibition in the United Kingdom

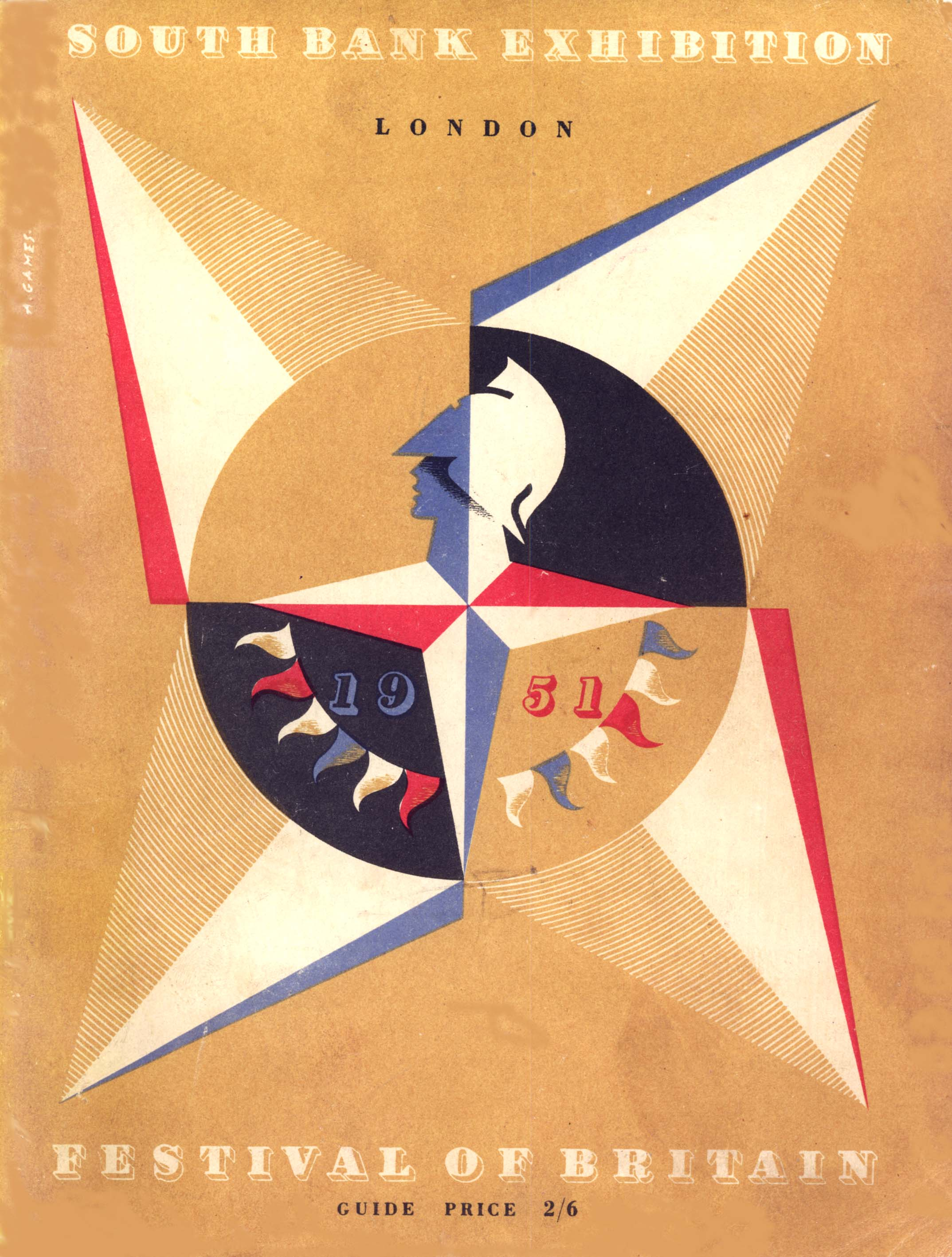
The Festival of Britain emblem – the Festival Star – designed by Abram Games, from the cover of the South Bank Exhibition Guide, 1951

The Festival of Britain was a national exhibition and fair held throughout the United Kingdom in the summer of 1951. Funded chiefly by the government at a cost of £12 million, it was intended to give the British public a sense of recovery and progress after the devastation of the Second World War, and to promote British science, technology, industrial design, architecture and the arts. It proved immensely popular, with more than ten million paid admissions to its six main exhibitions, and helped reshape British arts, crafts and design for a generation. The Festival grew out of a proposal to celebrate the centenary of the Great Exhibition of 1851. Labour Party cabinet member Herbert Morrison took charge in 1947 and shaped it into a uniquely British event: unlike a World Fair, it excluded international themes and the British Commonwealth, focusing entirely on Britain and its achievements. The Labour government was losing support, and the festival served the implicit goal of demonstrating successful national recovery. The Festival's centrepiece was on the South Bank of the Thames in London. There were also events in Poplar (Architecture – Lansbury Estate), Battersea (the Festival Pleasure Gardens), South Kensington (Science) and Glasgow (Industrial Power). Festival celebrations took place in Cardiff, Stratford-upon-Avon, Bath, Perth, Bournemouth, York, Aldeburgh, Inverness, Cheltenham, Oxford, Norwich, Canterbury and elsewhere, and there were touring exhibitions by land and sea. Journalist Harry Hopkins highlighted the widespread impact of the "Festival style", which people called "Contemporary":

clean, bright and new.... It caught hold quickly and spread first across London and then across England....In an island hitherto largely given up to gravy browns and dull greens, "Contemporary" boldly espoused strong primary colors.

Historian Kenneth O. Morgan described the Festival as a "triumphant success" during which people:

flocked to the South Bank site, to wander around the Dome of Discovery, gaze at the Skylon, and generally enjoy a festival of national celebration. Up and down the land, lesser festivals enlisted much civic and voluntary enthusiasm. A people curbed by years of total war and half-crushed by austerity and gloom, showed that it had not lost the capacity for enjoying itself....Above all, the Festival made a spectacular setting as a showpiece for the inventiveness and genius of British scientists and technologists.

== Conception and organisation ==
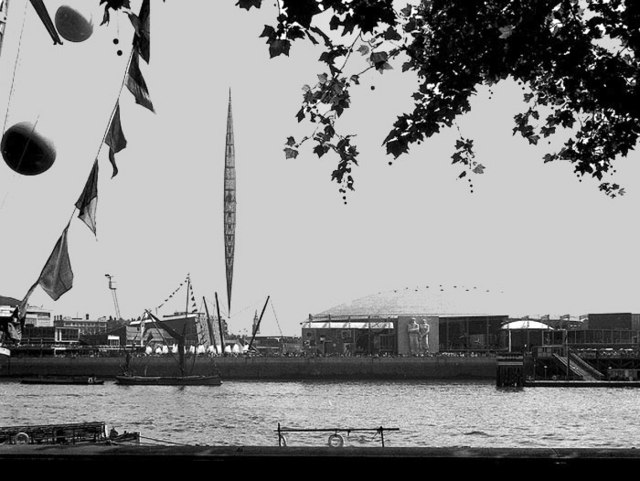
A view of the South Bank Exhibition from the north bank of the Thames, showing the 300-foot (91 m) tall Skylon and the Dome of Discovery

The first idea for an exhibition in 1951 came from the Royal Society of Arts in 1943, which considered that an international exhibition should be held to commemorate the centenary of the 1851 Great Exhibition. In 1945, the government appointed a committee under Lord Ramsden to consider how exhibitions and fairs could promote exports. When the committee reported a year later, it was decided not to continue with the idea of an international exhibition because of its cost at a time when reconstruction was a high priority. Herbert Morrison took charge for the Labour government and decided instead to hold a series of displays about the arts, architecture, science, technology and industrial design, under the title "Festival of Britain 1951". Morrison insisted there be no politics, explicit or implicit. As a result, Labour-sponsored programmes such as nationalisation, universal health care and working-class housing were excluded; instead, what was allowed was town planning, scientific progress, and all sorts of traditional and modern arts and crafts.

Much of London lay in ruins, and models of redevelopment were needed. The Festival was an attempt to give Britons a feeling of recovery and progress and to promote better-quality design in the rebuilding of British towns and cities. The Festival of Britain described itself as "one united act of national reassessment, and one corporate reaffirmation of faith in the nation's future." Gerald Barry, the Festival Director, described it as "a tonic to the nation".

A Festival Council to advise the government was set up under General Lord Ismay. Responsibility for organisation devolved upon the Lord President of the Council, Herbert Morrison, the deputy leader of the Labour Party, who had been London County Council leader. He appointed a Great Exhibition Centenary Committee, consisting of civil servants, who were to define the framework of the Festival and to liaise between government departments and the festival organisation. In March 1948, a Festival Headquarters was set up, which was to be the nucleus of the Festival of Britain Office, a government department with its own budget. Festival projects in Northern Ireland were undertaken by the government of Northern Ireland.

The Public Works (Festival of Britain) Act 1949, an act of the Parliament of the United Kingdom, enabled the London County Council and the British Transport Commission to carry out certain works to facilitate the movement of traffic during the festival.

The Festival of Britain (Supplementary Provisions) Act 1949, an act of the Parliament of the United Kingdom, enabled an initial loan of £770,000 and enabled the construction of gardens for the festival.

Associated with the Festival of Britain Office were the Arts Council of Great Britain, the Council of Industrial Design, the British Film Institute and the National Book League. In addition, a Council for Architecture and a Council for Science and Technology were specially created to advise the Festival Organisation and a Committee of Christian Churches was set up to advise on religion. Government grants were made to the Arts Council, the Council of Industrial Design, the British Film Institute and the National Museum of Wales for work undertaken as part of the Festival.

Gerald Barry had operational charge. A long-time editor with left-leaning, middle-brow views, he was energetic and optimistic, with an eye for what would be popular, and a knack on how to motivate others. Unlike Morrison, Barry was not seen as a Labour ideologue. Barry selected the next rank, giving preference to young architects and designers who had collaborated on exhibitions for the wartime Ministry of Information. They thought along the same lines socially and aesthetically, as middle-class intellectuals with progressive sympathies. Thanks to Barry, a collegial sentiment prevailed that minimised stress and delay.

The Festival of Britain (Sunday Opening) Act 1951, an act of the Parliament of the United Kingdom, was passed to enable the festival to be open on Sundays.

The Festival of Britain (Additional Loans) Act 1951, an act of the Parliament of the United Kingdom, was passed to authorise additional loans of up to £1 million, in addition to the £770,000 that was authorised in 1949.

=== Displays ===
The arts were displayed in a series of country-wide musical and dramatic performances. Achievements in architecture were presented in a new neighbourhood, the Lansbury Estate, planned, built and occupied in the Poplar district of London.

The Festival's centrepiece was the South Bank Exhibition, in the Waterloo area of London, which demonstrated the contribution made by British advances in science, technology and industrial design, displayed, in their practical and applied form, against a background representing the living, working world of the day.

There were other displays elsewhere, each intended to be complete in itself, yet each part of the one single conception. Festival Pleasure Gardens were set up in Battersea, about three miles up river from the South Bank. Heavy engineering was the subject of an Exhibition of Industrial Power in Glasgow. Certain aspects of science, which did not fall within the terms of reference of the South Bank Exhibition, were displayed in South Kensington. Linen technology and science in agriculture were exhibited in "Farm and Factory" in Belfast. A smaller exhibition of the South Bank story was put on in the Festival ship Campania, which toured the coast of Britain throughout the summer of 1951, and on land there was a travelling exhibition of industrial design.

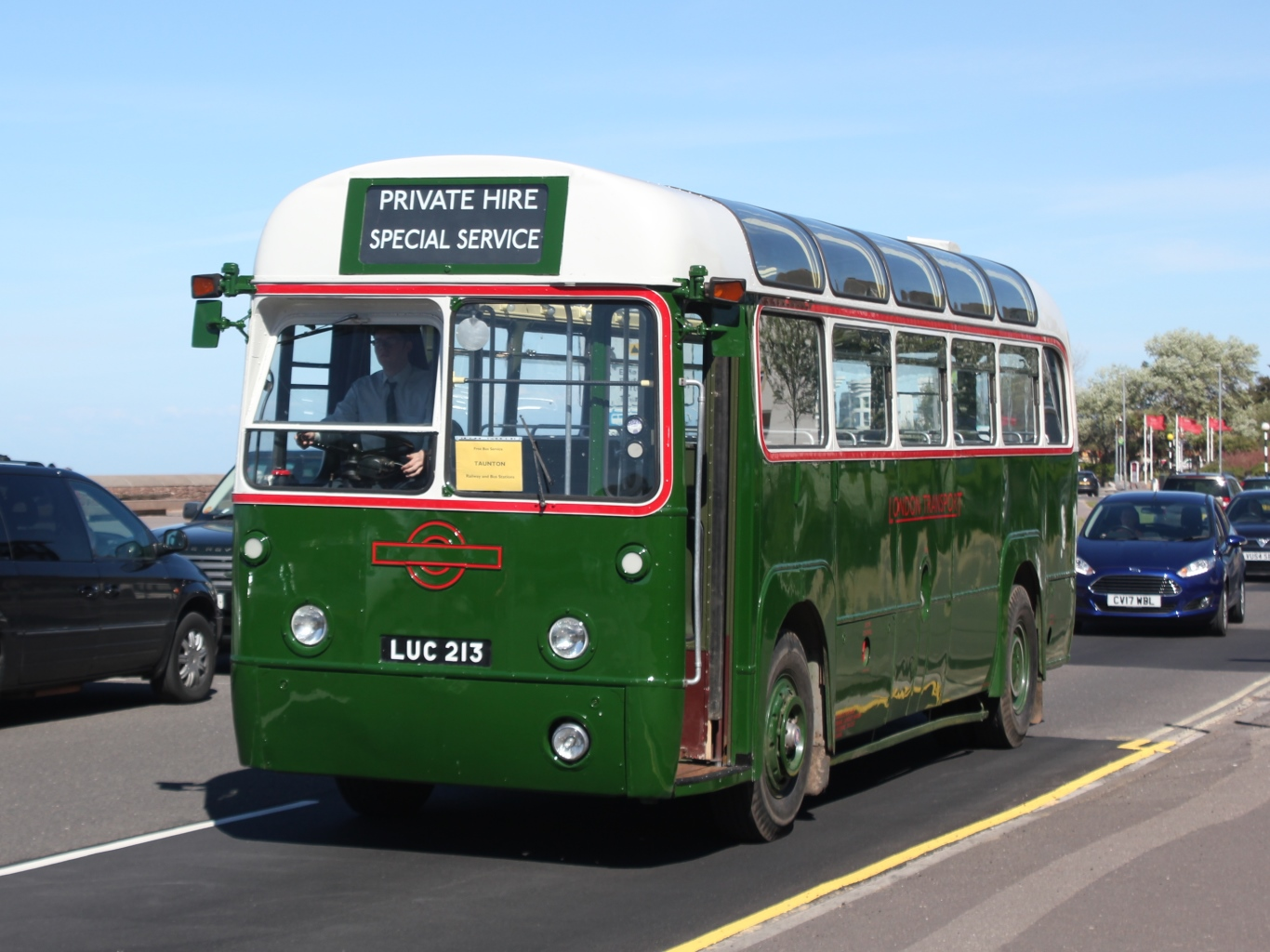
London Transport RF13 (LUC213)

London Transport ordered its first batch of 25 post-war RF single deck buses fitted with roof lights to provide a fleet of sight-seeing coaches for the festival. In addition it sent four new RT buses on a promotional tour of Europe, covering 4,000 mi (6,400 km) and eight countries.

The University of Brighton Design Archives have digitised many of the Design Council's files relating to the planning of the festival.

== Principal events ==
=== England ===
Exhibitions

- South Bank, London (4 May – 30 September)
- Science, South Kensington (4 May – 30 September)
- Architecture, Poplar (3 May – 30 September)
- Books, South Kensington (5 May – 30 September)
- 1851 Centenary Exhibition, South Kensington (1 May – 11 October)
- Festival of British Films, London (4 June – 17 June)

Festival Pleasure Gardens, Battersea Park, London (3 May – 3 November)

London Season of the Arts (3 May – 30 June)

Arts Festivals

- Stratford-upon-Avon (24 March – 27 October)
- Bath (20 May – 2 June)
- Bournemouth and Wessex (3 June – 17 June)
- York (3 June – 17 June)
- Aldeburgh (8 June – 17 June)
- Norwich (18 June – 30 June)
- Cheltenham (2 July – 14 July)
- Oxford (2 July – 16 July)
- Brighton (16 July – 25 August)
- Canterbury (18 July – 10 August)
- Liverpool (22 July – 12 August)
- Cambridge (30 July – 18 August)
- Worcester (2 September – 7 September)

=== Wales ===
Pageant of Wales, Sophia Gardens, Cardiff

St Fagan's Folk Festival, Cardiff

Welsh Hillside Farm Scheme, Dolhendre

Arts Festivals

=== Scotland ===
Exhibitions

- Industrial Power, Glasgow
- Contemporary Books, Glasgow
- "Living Traditions" – Scottish Architecture and Crafts, Edinburgh
- 18th Century Books, Edinburgh

Arts Festivals

Gathering of the Clans, Edinburgh

Scots Poetry Competition

Masque of St. Andrews, St. Andrews

=== Northern Ireland ===
Ulster Farm and Factory, Belfast

Arts Festival

=== Travelling exhibitions ===
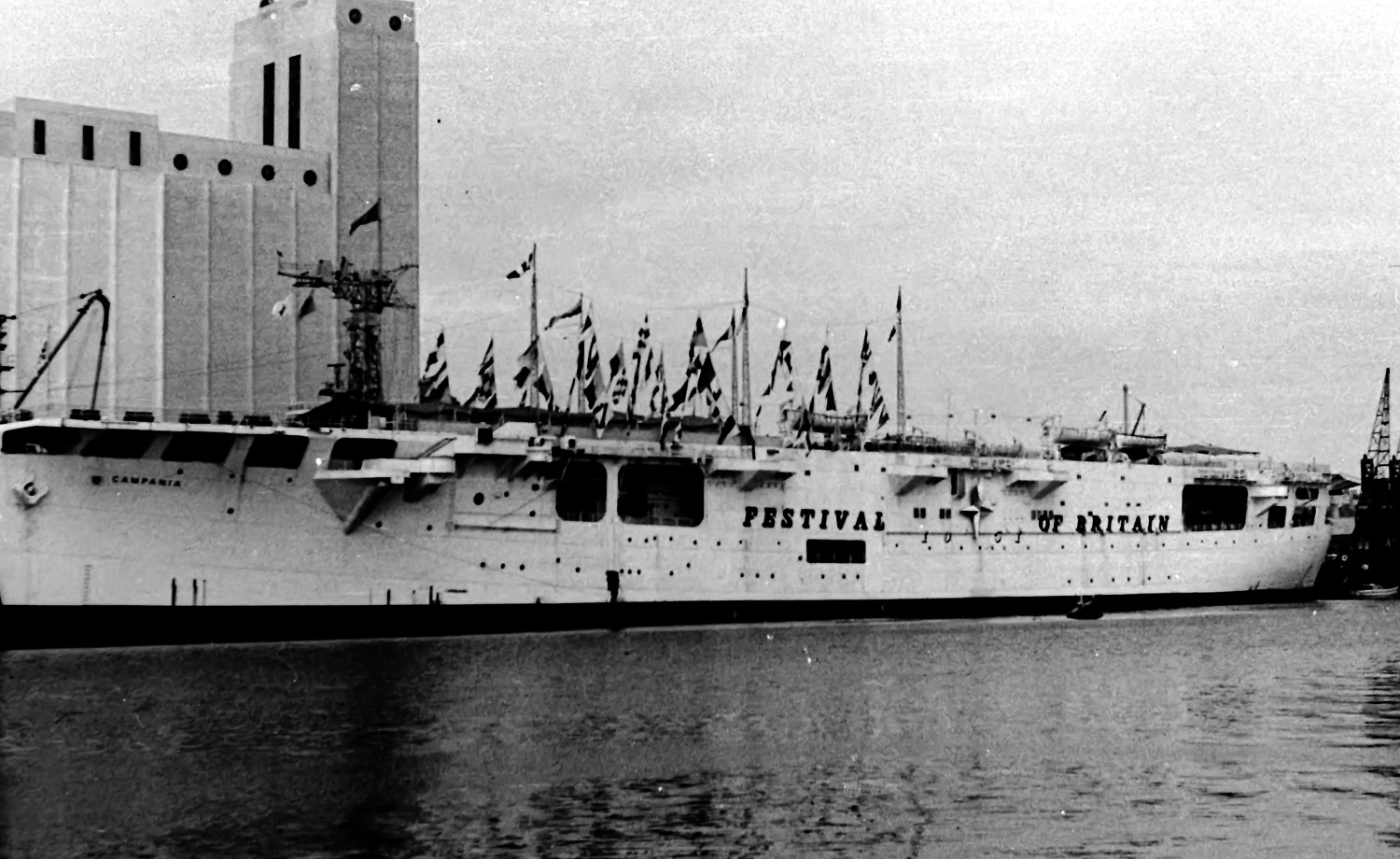
Campania in festival dress

Festival Ship Campania: England, Scotland, Wales and Northern Ireland

- Southampton (4 May – 14 May)
- Dundee (18 May – 26 May)
- Newcastle (30 May – 16 June)
- Hull (20 June – 30 June)
- Plymouth (5 July – 14 July)
- Bristol (18 July – 28 July)
- Cardiff (31 July – 11 August)
- Belfast (15 August – 1 September)
- Birkenhead (5 September – 14 September)
- Glasgow (18 September – 6 October)

Land Travelling Exhibition : England

- Manchester (5 May – 26 May)
- Leeds (23 June – 14 July)
- Birmingham (4 August — 25 August)
- Nottingham (15 September – 6 October)

== The South Bank Exhibition ==
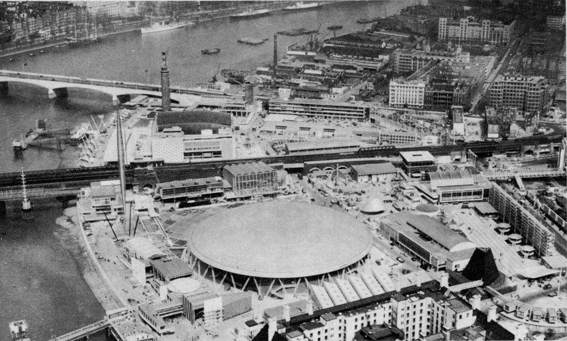
Festival of Britain aerial view

Construction of the South Bank site opened up a new public space, including a riverside walkway, where previously there had been warehouses and working-class housing. The layout of the South Bank site was intended to showcase the principles of urban design that would feature in the post-war rebuilding of London and the creation of the new towns. These included multiple levels of buildings, elevated walkways and avoidance of a street grid. Most of the South Bank buildings were International Modernist in style, little seen in Britain before the war.

The architecture and display of the South Bank Exhibition were planned by the Festival Office's Exhibition Presentation Panel, whose members were:

- Gerald Barry, Director-General, Chairman
- Cecil Cooke, Director, Exhibitions, Deputy Chairman
- Misha Black
- G. A. Campbell, Director, Finances and Establishments
- Hugh Casson, Director, Architecture
- Ian Cox, Director, Science and Technology
- A. D. Hippisley Coxe, Council of Industrial Design
- James Gardner
- James Holland
- M. Hartland Thomas, Council of Industrial Design
- Ralph Tubbs
- Peter Kneebone, Secretary

The theme of the Exhibition was devised by Ian Cox.

The Exhibition comprised the Upstream Circuit: "The Land", the Dome of Discovery, the Downstream Circuit: "The People", and other displays.

=== Upstream Circuit: "The Land" ===
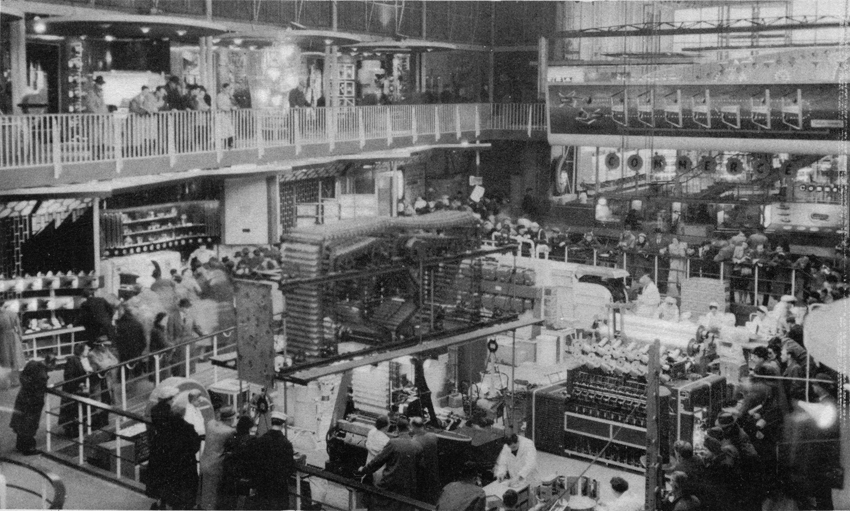
Power and Production pavilion interior

Architect: Misha Black Theme: Ian Cox Display Design: James Holland

The exhibits comprised:

- The Land of Britain. (Architect: H. T. Cadbury-Brown. Theme Convener: Kenneth Chapman. Display Design: V.Rotter)
- The Natural Scene. (Architect: Brian O'Rorke. Theme Convener: Kenneth Chapman. Display Designer: F. H. K. Henrion)
- The Country. (Architect: Brian O'Rorke. Theme Conveners: A. S. Thomas, Peter B. Collins. Display Designer: F. H. K. Henrion)
- Minerals of the Island. (Architects: Architects' Co-operative Partnership. Theme Convener: Sonia Withers. Display Designer: Beverley Pick)
- Power and Production. (Architects: George Grenfell Baines and H. J. Reifenberg. Theme Convener: C. J. Whitcombe. Display Design: Warnett Kennedy and Associates)
- Sea and Ships. (Architects: Basil Spence and Partners. Theme Conveners: C. Hamilton Ellis and Nigel Clayton. Display Designers: James Holland and Basil Spence)
- Transport. (Architects and Designers: Arcon. Theme Direction: George Williams)

=== The Dome of Discovery ===
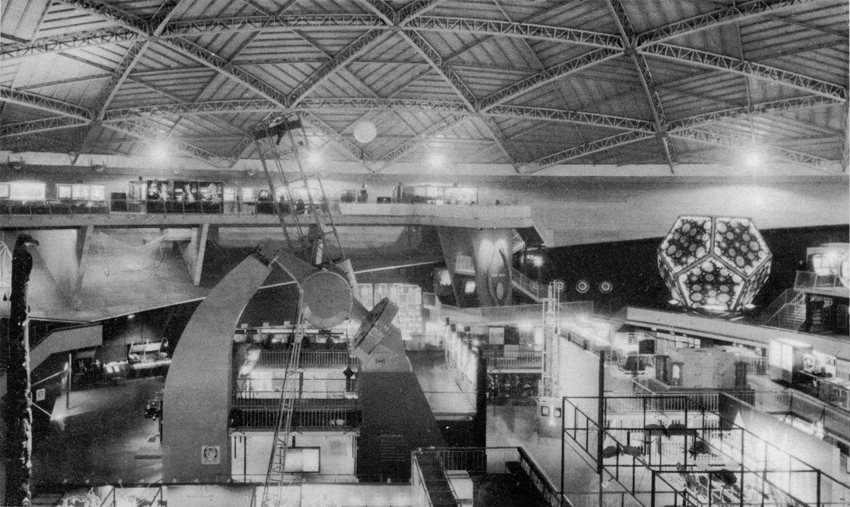
Interior of the Dome of Discovery

Architect: Ralph Tubbs Theme: Ian Cox Display: Design Research Unit

The exhibits focused on scientific discovery. They included:

- The Land. (Theme Convener. Penrose Angwin. Display Designers: Stefan Buzas and Ronald Sandiford.)
- The Earth. (Theme Convener: Sonia Withers. Display Designer: Robert Gutman.)
- Polar. (Theme Convener: Quinitin Riley and L. P. Macnair. Display Designer: Jock Kinneir.)
- Sea. (Theme Conveners: C. Hamilton Ellis and Nigel Clayton. Display Designers: Austin Frazer and Ellis Miles.)
- Sky. (Theme Convener: Arthur Garratt. Display Designer: Ronald Sandiford.)
- Outer Space. (Theme Convener: Penrose Angwin. Display Designers: Austin Frazer and Eric Towell.)
- The Living World. (Theme Convener: Kenneth Chapman. Display Designers: Austin Frazer and Stirling Craig.)
- The Physical World. (Theme Conveners: Arthur Garratt and Jan Read. Display Designers: Ronald Ingles and Clifford Hatts.)

=== Downstream Circuit: "The People" ===
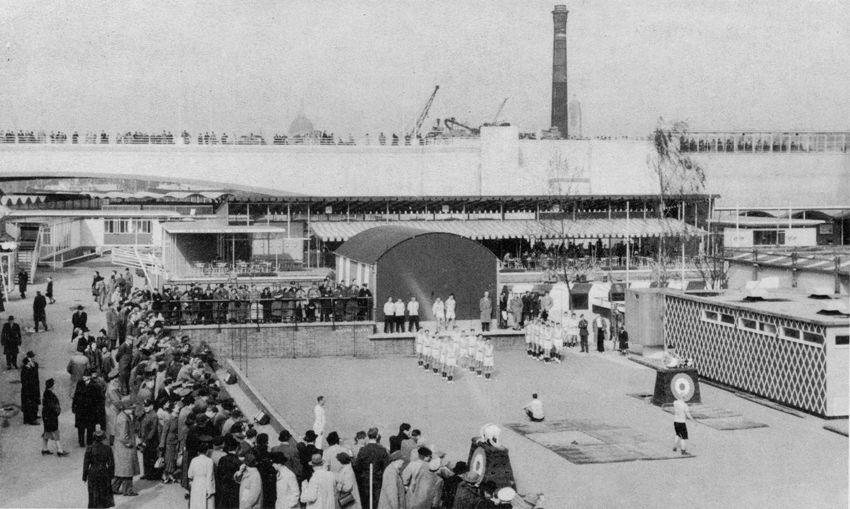
Sports arena

Architect: Hugh Casson Theme: M.Hartland Thomas Display Design: James Gardner

The exhibits comprised:

- The People of Britain. (Architect: H. T. Cadbury-Brown. Theme Convener: Jacquetta Hawkes. Display Design: James Gardner.)
- The Lion and the Unicorn (Architects: R. D. Russell, Robert Goodden. Theme Conveners: Hubert Phillips and Peter Stucley. Display Designers: Robert Goodden, R. D. Russell and Richard Guyatt. Commentary: Laurie Lee.)
- Homes and Gardens. (Architects: Bronek Katz and Reginald Vaughan. Theme Conveners: A.Hippisley Coxe and S. D. Cooke.)
- The New Schools. (Architects: Maxwell Fry and Jane Drew. Theme Convener: B. W. Rowe. Display Designers: Nevile Conder and Patience Clifford.)
- Health. (Theme Conveners: Sheldon Dudley and Nigel Clayton. Display Designer: Peter Ray.)
- Sport. (Architects and Designers: Gordon Bowyer and Ursula Bowyer. Theme Convener: B. W. Rowe.)
- Seaside. (Architects and Designers: Eric Brown and Peter Chamberlain. Theme Convener. A. Hippisley Coxe.)

=== Other Downstream Displays ===
- Television. (Architect and Designer: Wells Coates. Theme: Malcolm Baker Smith.)
- Telecinema. (Architect: Wells Coates. Programme and Presentation: J. D. Ralph and R. J. Spottiswoode.)
- The 1851 Centenary Pavilion. (Architect: Hugh Casson. Display Designer: James Gardner.)
- Shot Tower. (Architecture and Design Treatment: Hugh Casson and James Gardner.)
- Design Review. (Display Designers: Nevile Conder and Patience Clifford.)

=== Other features of the South Bank Exhibition ===
==== The Skylon ====
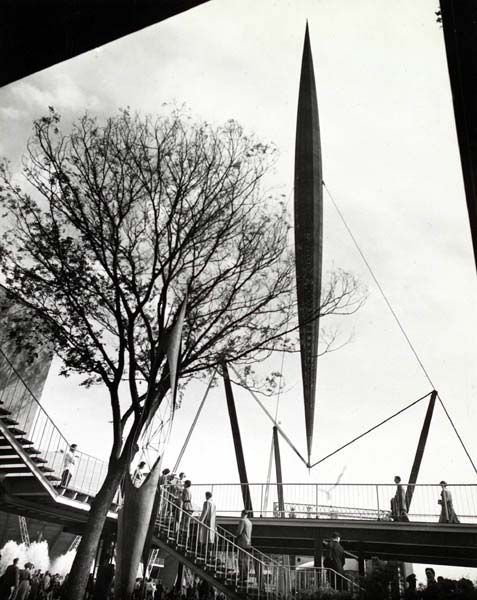
The Skylon

An unusual cigar-shaped aluminium-clad steel tower supported by cables, the Skylon was the "Vertical Feature" that was an abiding symbol of the Festival of Britain. The base was nearly 15 metres (50 feet) from the ground, with the top nearly 90 metres (300 feet) high. The frame was clad in aluminium louvres lit from within at night. It was designed by Hidalgo Moya, Philip Powell and Felix Samuely, and fabricated by Painter Brothers of Hereford, England, between Westminster Bridge and Hungerford Bridge. It had a steel latticework frame, pointed at both ends and supported on cables slung between three steel beams. The partially constructed Skylon was rigged vertically, then grew taller in situ. The architects' design was made possible by the engineer Felix Samuely who, at the time, was a lecturer at the Architectural Association School of Architecture in Bedford Square, Bloomsbury. The Skylon was scrapped in 1952 on the orders of Winston Churchill, who saw it as a symbol of the preceding Labour government. It was demolished and sold for scrap after being toppled into the Thames.

==== Royal Festival Hall ====
Designed by Leslie Martin, Peter Moro and Robert Matthew from the LCC's Architects' Department and built by Holland, Hannen & Cubitts for London County Council. The foundation stone was laid by Prime Minister Clement Attlee in 1949, on the site of the former Lion Brewery, built in 1837. Martin was 39 when he was appointed to lead the design team in late 1948. He designed the structure as an 'egg in a box', a term he used to describe the separation of the curved auditorium space from the surrounding building and the noise and vibration of the adjacent railway viaduct. Sir Thomas Beecham used similar imagery, calling the building a "giant chicken coop". The building was officially opened on 3 May 1951. The inaugural concerts were conducted by Sir Malcolm Sargent and Sir Adrian Boult. In April 1988 it was designated a Grade I listed building, the first post-war building to become thus protected.

==== Minor features ====
- The Festival Administration Building, by Maxwell Fry, Jane Drew and Edward Mills.

== Festival Pleasure Gardens ==
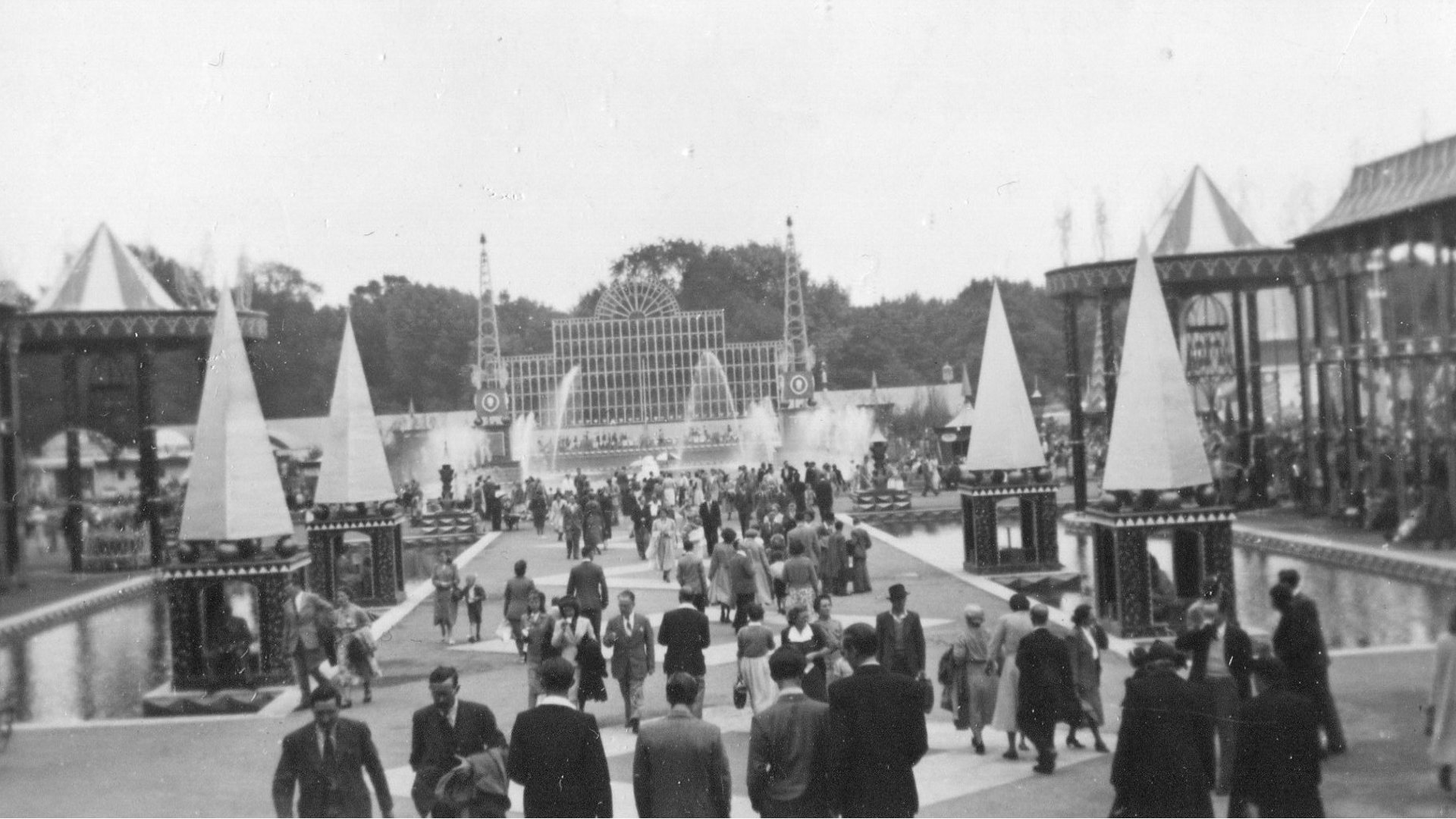
The Festival Pleasure Gardens

The Festival Pleasure Gardens were created to present a lighter side of the Festival of Britain. They were erected in Battersea Park, a few miles from the South Bank Exhibition. Attractions included:

- An amusement park which would outlast the other entertainments. It included the Big Dipper and became the Battersea Fun Fair, staying open until the mid-1970s
- A miniature railway designed by Rowland Emett. It ran for 500 yards along the south of the gardens with a station near the south east entrance and another (with snack bar) at the western end of the line
- A "West End" Restaurant with a terrace overlooking the river and facing Cheyne Walk
- Foaming Fountains, later restored
- A wine garden surrounded by miniature pavilions
- A wet weather pavilion with a stage facing two ways so that performances could take place in the open air. It had murals designed by the film set designer Ferdinand Bellan
- An amphitheatre seating 1,250 people. The opening show featured the music hall star Lupino Lane and his company. It was later turned into a circus

The majority of the buildings and pavilions on the site were designed by John Piper. There was also a whimsical Guinness Festival Clock resembling a three dimensional version of a cartoon drawing. The Pleasure Gardens received as many visitors as the South Bank Festival. They were managed by a specially-formed private company financed by loans from the Festival Office and the London County Council. As the attractions failed to cover their costs, it was decided to keep them open after the rest of the Festival had closed.

== Aspects of the Festival ==
=== Architecture ===
The Festival architects tried to show by the design and layout of the South Bank Festival what could be achieved by applying modern town planning ideas. The Festival Style, (also called "Contemporary") combining modernism with whimsy and Englishness, influenced architecture, interior design, product design and typography in the 1950s. William Feaver describes the Festival Style as "Braced legs, indoor plants, lily of the valley sprays of lightbulbs, aluminium lattices, Cotswold-type walling with picture windows, flying staircases, blond wood, the thorn, the spike, the molecule." The influence of the Festival Style was felt in the new towns, coffee bars and office blocks of the fifties. Harlow new town and the rebuilding of Coventry city centre are said to show the influence of the Festival Style "in their light structures, picturesque layout and incorporation of works of art", and Coventry Cathedral (1962), designed by Basil Spence, one of the Festival architects, was dubbed "The Festival of Britain at Prayer".

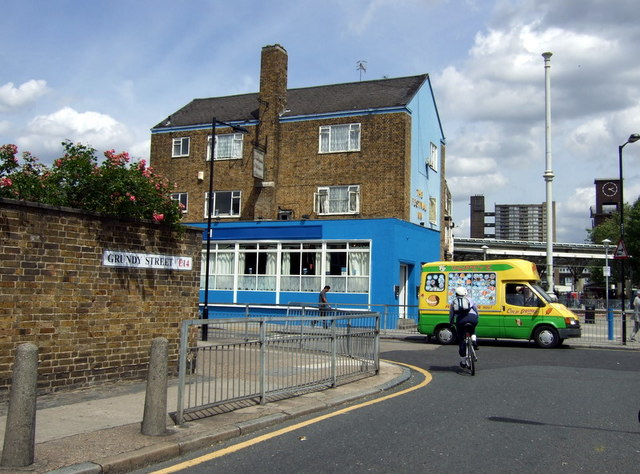
The Festival Inn, Poplar

There was an exhibition about building research, town planning and architecture, the "Live architecture" exhibit of buildings, open spaces and streets in the Lansbury Estate, Poplar (named after the former Labour Party leader George Lansbury. Plans for social housing in the area had commenced in 1943. By the end of the war nearly a quarter of the buildings in this part of East London had been destroyed or badly damaged. In 1948, the Architecture Council decided that the Poplar site would make a good exhibition partly because it was near to the other Festival exhibitions. Despite funding problems, work began in December 1949 and by May 1950 was well advanced. The wet winter of 1950–51 delayed work, but the first houses were completed and occupied by February 1951. The exhibition opened on 3 May 1951 along with the other Festival exhibitions. Visitors first went to the Building Research Pavilion, which displayed housing problems and their solutions, then to the Town Planning Pavilion, a large, red-and-white striped tent. The Town Planning Pavilion demonstrated the principles of town planning and the urgent need for new towns, including a mock up of an imaginary town called "Avoncaster". Visitors then saw the buildings of the Lansbury Estate. Attendance was disappointing, only 86,426 people visiting, compared to 8 million who visited the South Bank exhibition. Reaction to the development by industry professionals was lukewarm, some criticising its small scale. Subsequent local authorities concentrated on high-rise, high-density social housing rather than the Lansbury Estate model. The estate remains popular with residents. Among the remaining 1951 buildings are Trinity Independent Chapel, and The Festival Inn and Festive Briton (now Callaghans) pubs.

Misha Black, one of the Festival architects, said that the Festival created a wide audience for architectural modernism but that it was common currency among professional architects that the design of the Festival was not innovative. The design writer Reyner Banham has questioned the originality and the Englishness of the Festival Style and indeed the extent of its influence. Young architects in 1951 are said to have despised the Festival of Britain for its architecture. "It was equated with the 'Contemporary Style', and an editorial on New Brutalism in Architectural Design in 1955 carried the epigraph, 'When I hear the word "Contemporary" I reach for my revolver.'"

=== Design ===
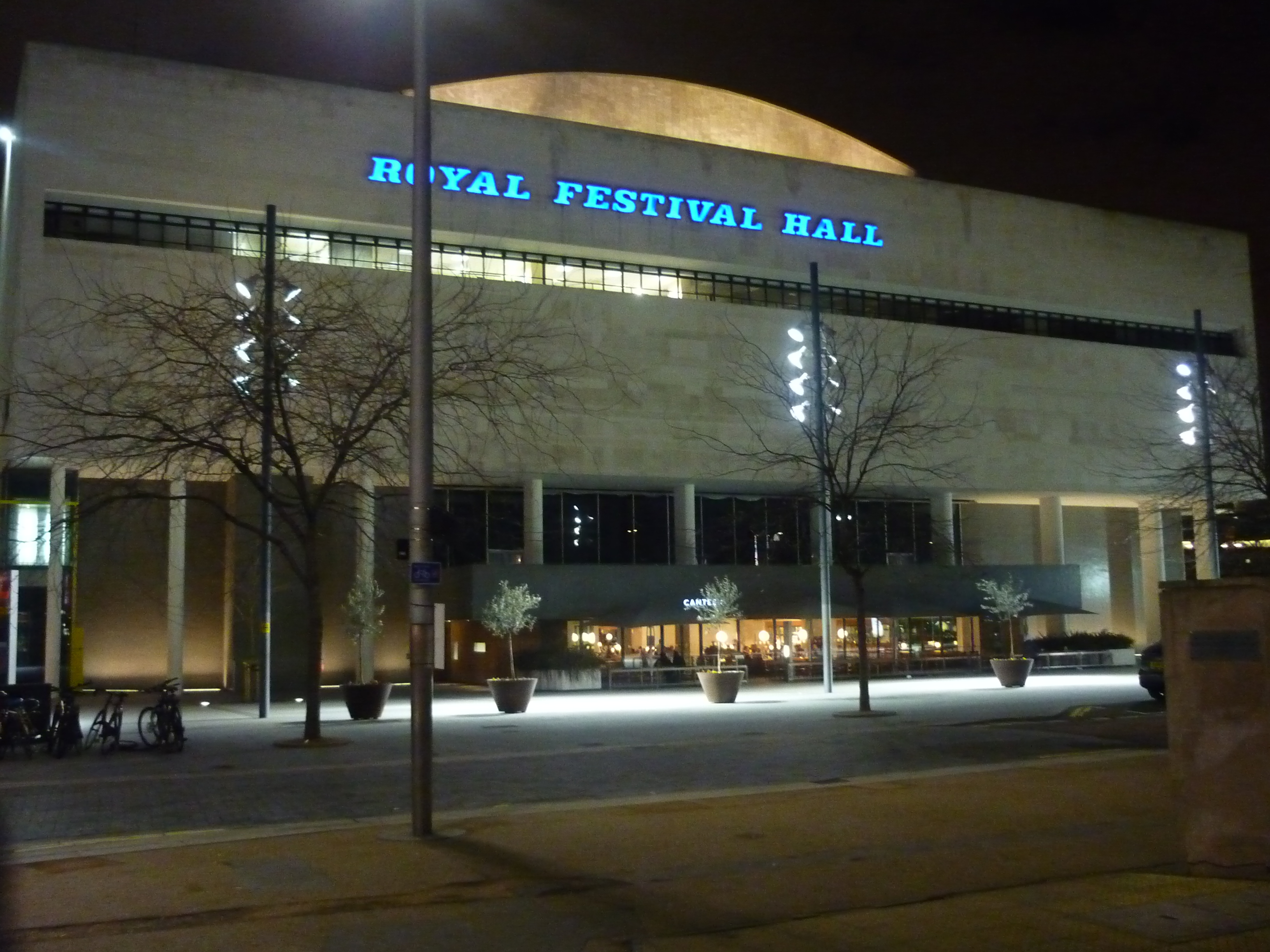
The Royal Festival Hall, showing the lettering designed for the South Bank Exhibition by the Festival typography panel

The South Bank Exhibition included a Design Review that presented "an illustrated record of contemporary achievement in British industry", showing "the high standard of design and craftsmanship that has been reached in a wide range of British products." The exhibits were based on the stock list of the Council of Industrial Design (CoID) and were chosen for appearance, finish, workmanship, technical efficiency, fitness for purpose and economy of production. In selecting and promoting designs in this way, the Festival was an influential advocate of the concept of "Good Design", a rational approach to product design in accordance with the principles of the Modern Movement. Its advocacy of Good Design had grown partly out of the standards of utility furniture created during the war (Gordon Russell, the Director of the CoID, had been Chairman of the Utility Furniture Design Panel) and partly out of the CoID's Britain Can Make It exhibition of 1946. The CoiD's stock list was retained and inherited by its successor, the Design Council.

Design, science and industry came together in the Festival Pattern Group, which commissioned textiles, wallpaper, domestic objects and Festival exhibits based on x-ray crystallography. The idea of using the molecular patterns revealed in x-ray crystallography in surface patterns was first suggested by Dr Helen Megaw, a leading Cambridge University crystallographer. After hearing a presentation by Dorothy Hodgkin to the Society of Industrial Artists, Mark Hartland Thomas, chief industrial officer of the CoID, took up the idea and formed the Festival Pattern Group. Hartland Thomas was a member of the Festival of Britain Presentation Panel and was co-ordinating the CoID's stock list. He secured the Regatta Restaurant, one of the temporary restaurants on the South Bank, for an experiment in pattern design based on the crystal structure of haemoglobin, insulin, wareite, china clay, mica and other molecules, which were used for the surface patterns of the restaurant furnishings. The designs that were sponsored by the Festival Pattern Group chimed in with displays in the Dome of Discovery about the structure of matter and the Festival's emphasis on progress, science and technology. The Science Museum in London holds a collection of the Festival's fabrics donated by Dr Megaw; it also includes the official souvenir book by Mark Hartland Thomas.

Lettering and type design featured prominently in the graphic style of the Festival and was overseen by a typography panel including the lettering historian Nicolete Gray. A typeface for the Festival, Festival Titling, was specially commissioned and designed by Philip Boydell. It was based on condensed sans-serif capitals and had a three-dimensional form making it suitable for use in exhibition display typography. It has been said to bear "a vague resemblance to bunting". The lettering on the Royal Festival Hall and the temporary Festival building on the South Bank was a bold, sloping slab serif letter form, determined by Gray and her colleagues, including Charles Hasler and Gordon Cullen, illustrated in Gray's Lettering on Buildings (1960) and derived in part from typefaces used in the early 19th century. It has been described as a "turn to a jauntier and more decorative visual language" that was "part of a wider move towards the appreciation of vernacular arts and the peculiarities of English culture". The lettering in the Lion and Unicorn Pavilion was designed by John Brinkley.

The graphic designer for the Festival was Abram Games, who created its emblem, the Festival Star.

=== The arts ===
The South Bank Exhibition showed the work of contemporary artists such as William Scott, including murals by Victor Pasmore, John Tunnard, Feliks Topolski, Barbara Jones, and John Piper and sculptures by Barbara Hepworth, Henry Moore, Lynn Chadwick, Jacob Epstein and Reg Butler.

Arts festivals were held throughout the summer as part of the Festival of Britain:

- Aberdeen Festival 30 July – 13 August
- Aldeburgh Festival of Music and the Arts 8–17 June
- Bath Assembly 20 May – 2 June
- Belfast Festival of the Arts 7 May – 30 June
- Bournemouth and Wessex Festival 13–17 June
- Brighton Regency Festival 16 July – 25 August
- Cambridge Festival 30 July – 18 August
- Canterbury Festival 18 July – 10 August
- Cheltenham Festival of British Contemporary Music 18 July – 10 August
- Dumfries Festival of the Arts 24–30 June
- Inverness 1951 Highland Festival 17–30 June
- Liverpool Festival 22 July – 12 August
- Llangollen International Eisteddfod 3–8 July
- Llanrwst (Royal National Eisteddfod of Wales) 6–11 August
- Norwich Festival 18–30 June
- Oxford Festival 2–16 July
- Perth Arts Festival 27 May – 16 June
- Stratford-upon-Avon (Shakespeare Festival) April – October
- St David's Festival (Music and Worship) 10–13 July
- Swansea Festival of Music 16–29 September
- Worcester (Three Choirs Festival) 2–7 September
- York Festival (including a revival of the York Mystery Plays)

The London Season of the Arts comprised exhibitions specially arranged for the Festival of Britain. They included:

- "An Exhibition of Sixty Large Paintings commissioned for the Festival of Britain" ("60 Paintings for '51"), Suffolk Galleries, organised by the Arts Council, prize awarded to William Gear;
- Exhibitions of the works of Hogarth and Henry Moore, Tate Gallery;
- Open-air International Exhibition of Sculpture, Battersea Park;
- "Modern British Painting", New Burlington Gallery;
- "An Exhibition of Exhibitions", Royal Society of the Arts.
- Two exhibitions at the Whitechapel Art Gallery: "Black Eyes and Lemonade" and "East End 1851".

Barbara Jones and Tom Ingram organised "Black Eyes and Lemonade", an exhibition of British popular and traditional art, in association with the Society for Education in Art and the Arts Council. In the same year she surveyed the popular arts in her influential book, The Unsophisticated Arts, which included taxidermy, fairgrounds, canal boats, seaside, riverside, tattooing, the decoration of food, waxworks, toys, rustic work, shops, festivals and funerals. She said of the popular arts," some of it is made for themselves by people without professional training in the arts or in the appreciation of them, and some of it has been made for those people by professionals who work to their taste."

The Festival was the occasion of the first performance of steelpan music in Britain by the Trinidad All Steel Percussion Orchestra.

=== Film ===
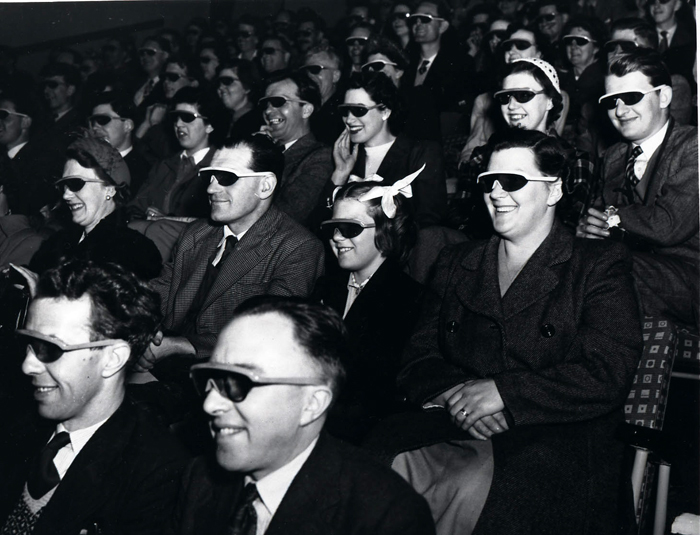
Audience wearing special glasses watch a 3D "stereoscopic film" at the Telekinema on the South Bank in London during the Festival of Britain in 1951.

The British Film Institute was asked by Herbert Morrison in 1948 to consider the contribution that film could make to the Festival. It set up a panel including Michael Balcon, Antony Asquith, John Grierson, Harry Watt and Arthur Elston, which became a committee of sponsorship and distribution. More than a dozen sponsored documentary films were made for the Festival, including:

- Air Parade, sponsored by the Shell Film Unit
- Family Portrait, made by Humphrey Jennings
- David, a short film based on the life of Welsh poet David Rees Griffiths (and in which he appeared), made by Wide Pictures and the Welsh Committee
- Water of Time, made by International Realist films and sponsored by the Port of London Authority
- Forward a Century, sponsored by the Petroleum Films Bureau.

Several feature films were planned, but only one was completed in time, namely The Magic Box, a biopic concerning pioneer cinematographer William Friese-Greene, made by Festival Film Productions.

There was a purpose-built film theatre on the South Bank, the Telecinema (sometimes called the "Telekinema"), designed by Wells Coates, which showed documentary and experimental film exploiting stereophony and stereoscopy and the new invention of television. It was one of the most popular attractions of the Festival, with 458,693 visitors. When the Festival ended, the Telecinema was handed over to the BFI for use as a members-only repertory cinema club, re-opening in 1952 as the National Film Theatre.

Film was integral to the South Bank Exhibition, used to explain manufacturing, science and technology. The Dome of Discovery, the Exhibition of Science in South Kensington and the travelling Festival Exhibition made extensive use of educational and explanatory film.

Film festivals, including those at Edinburgh Film Festival, Bath and Glasgow participated in the Festival of Britain, and local authorities put on film festivals, helped by a BFI pamphlet, How to put on a Film Show.

Commercial cinema chains and independent cinemas also joined in, the Gaumont and Odeon chains programming seasons of British films. "And finally, if the Festival visitor had not tired of the medium, they could purchase colour 16mm film of Britain’s historic buildings and pageantry and filmstrips of the Festival of Britain and London as souvenirs."

One of the British Broadcasting Corporation's contributions to the Festival was a television musical entitled The Golden Year, broadcast on 23 June and 2 July.

=== Science ===
A new wing was built for the Science Museum to hold the Exhibition of Science. The first part of the exhibition showed the physical and chemical nature of matter and the behaviour of elements and molecules. The second part, "The Structure of Living Things", dealt with plants and animals. The third part, "Stop Press", showed some of the latest topics of research in science and their emergence from the ideas illustrated in the earlier sections of the exhibition. They included "the penetrating rays which reach us from outer space, what goes on in space and in the stars, and a range of subjects from the electronic brain to the processes and structures on which life is based."

It has been claimed that "the Festival of Britain created a confusion at the heart of subsequent discussions amongst administrators and educationalists concerning the place science should have in British life and thought as a whole (particularly education), and its role in Britain’s post-war greatness."

== Other festival events ==
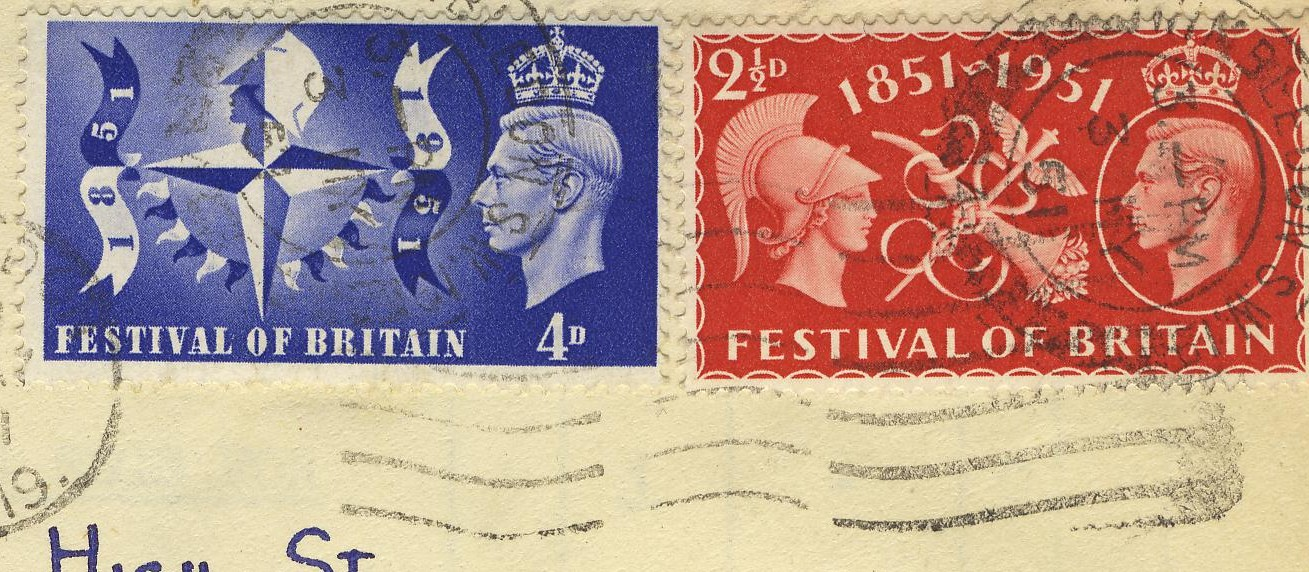
Postage stamps commemorating the Festival of Britain, with the Festival Star on the 4d issue

There were hundreds of events associated with the Festival, some of which were:

- The selection of Trowell, a Nottinghamshire village in the middle of England, as the Festival Village
- The re-design of Parliament Square by George Grey Wornum in preparation for the Festival of Britain year
- Commemorative postage stamps and many souvenirs, official and unofficial
- A commemorative crown coin (presented with a certificate in either a red or green presentation box), The crown coin featured on its reverse the St. George and the Dragon design by Benedetto Pistrucci, best known for its place on British Sovereign coins. The certificate states "The first English Silver Crown piece was minted in 1551. Four hundred years later, on the occasion of the Festival of Britain, the Royal Mint has issued a Crown piece, bearing on its edge the Latin inscription MDCCCLI CIVIUM INDUSTRIA FLORET CIVITAS MCMLI-1951 By the industry of its people the State flourishes 1951". A non-circulating cupronickel coin, about 2 million were minted, most in "prooflike" condition. It remains very inexpensive
- The restoration of Moot Hall, Elstow by Bedfordshire County Council
- The first performance of Robert McLellan's play Mary Stewart at the Glasgow Citizens Theatre
- The first performance of Ralph Vaughan Williams's opera The Pilgrim's Progress on 26 April 1951, at the Royal Opera House
- An exhibition about Sherlock Holmes (part of which is now owned by Westminster Libraries and part by the Sherlock Holmes pub)
- The William Shakespeare and The Merchant Venturer, two daily excursion trains run by the Western Region of British Railways from London to sites of British history, Stratford upon Avon and Bristol. The William Shakespeare proved to be financially unviable and only ran for the summer of the festival, but The Merchant Venturer remained in service until 1961

== Attendance figures ==
The Festival was highly popular in every part of Britain. Richard Weight estimates that of the national population of 49 million, about half participated. The Festival largely ignored foreign tourists, with most of the visitors from the Continent being expatriate Britons.

There were more than 10 million paid admissions to the six main exhibitions over a period of five months: The most popular event was the centrepiece at South Bank Exhibition, with almost 8.5 million visitors, more than half of them from outside London. The Festival Pleasure Gardens had more than 8 million visitors, three-quarters of them from London. The Festival Ship Campania, which docked in ten cities, was visited by almost 900,000 people. The Travelling Land Exhibition, which went to four English cities, attracted under half a million. The most specialised events, in terms of attracting few visitors, were the architecture exhibition in Poplar, with 87,000 visitors and the exhibition of books in South Kensington, with 63,000.

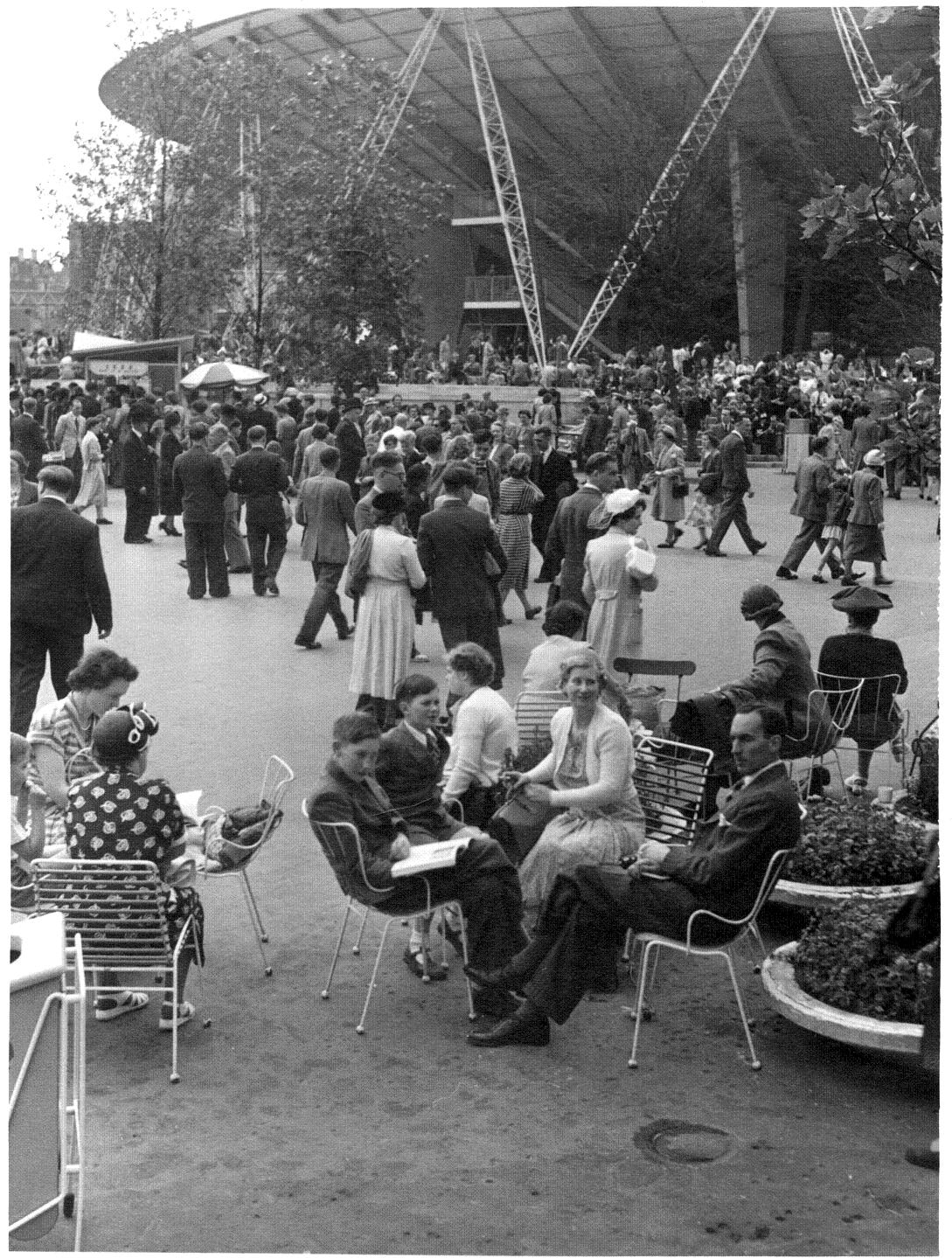
Visitors to the South Bank Exhibition with the Dome of Discovery in the background

Architecture Exhibition, Lansbury, Poplar (London)	86,646
Industrial Power Exhibition, Glasgow	282,039
Science Exhibition, South Kensington (London)	213,744
South Bank Exhibition, Waterloo (London)	8,455,863
– Visitors from London	36.5%
– Outside London	56%
– Overseas	7.5%
– US	15%
– Commonwealth	32%
– Europe	46%
– Elsewhere	7%
Land Travelling Exhibition	462,289
– Manchester	114,183
– Leeds	144,844
– Birmingham	76,357
– Nottingham	106,615
Festival Ship Campania	889,792
– Southampton	78,683
– Dundee	51,422
– Newcastle	169,511
– Hull	87,840
– Plymouth	50,120
– Bristol (Avonmouth)	78,219
– Cardiff	104,391
– Belfast	86,756
– Birkenhead	90,311
– Glasgow	93,539
Festival Pleasure Gardens, Battersea (London)	8,031,000
– Visitors from London	76%,
– Outside London	22%
– Overseas	2%
Ulster Farm & Factory Exhibition, Belfast	156,760
Living Traditions Exhibition, Edinburgh	135,000
Exhibition of Books, South Kensington (London)	63,162

== Political responses ==
The idea of holding the Festival became a party political issue. Although Herbert Morrison said that he did not want the Festival to be seen as a political venture, it became associated with the Labour Party, which had won the 1950 general election, and it was opposed by the Conservative Party. Hugh Casson said that "Churchill, like the rest of the Tory Party, was against the Festival which they (quite rightly) believed was the advanced guard of socialism." Churchill referred to the forthcoming Festival of Britain as "three-dimensional Socialist propaganda".

In an essay on the Festival, 17-year-old Michael Frayn characterised it as an enterprise of "the radical middle-classes, the do-gooders; the readers of the News Chronicle, The Guardian, and The Observer; the signers of petitions; the backbone of the B.B.C.", whom he called "Herbivores". In Frayn's view, "The Festival was the last, and virtually the posthumous, work of the Herbivore Britain of the BBC News, the Crown Film Unit, the sweet ration, the Ealing comedies, Uncle Mac, Sylvia Peters." In making the Festival the Herbivores "earned the contempt of the Carnivores – the readers of the Daily Express; the Evelyn Waughs; the cast of the Directory of Directors".

Some prominent members of the Labour government considered the Festival to be a Labour undertaking which would contribute to their future electoral success, and Clement Attlee, the Labour leader, wrote to Morrison saying that an election in autumn 1951 would enable the Labour Party to benefit from its popularity. In the event, Labour lost the autumn election.

== Legacy ==
The Guide Book to the Festival described its legacy in these words: "It will leave behind not just a record of what we have thought of ourselves in the year 1951 but, in a fair community founded where once there was a slum, in an avenue of trees or in some work of art, a reminder of what we have done to write this single, adventurous year into our national and local history."

While the idea of the Festival was being worked out, the government and the London County Council were at the same time planning the redevelopment of the South Bank site, including "a number of great buildings, which will form part of a co-ordinated design." The first of these was the Royal Festival Hall. The Festival hastened the reclamation of four and a half acres of land from the river, which "transformed the familiar patchwork of rubble and half-derelict buildings which had for so long monopolised the propect from the North Bank". The Festival site was, over the following thirty years, developed into the South Bank Centre, an arts complex comprising the Royal Festival Hall, the National Film Theatre, the Queen Elizabeth Hall, the Purcell Room and the National Theatre.

A 1951 office building at 219 Oxford Street, London, designed by Ronald Ward and Partners (now a Grade II* listed building), incorporates images of the Festival on its facade.

The Festival cost about £10.5 million (apart from the loans for the Festival Gardens), with revenues of about £2.5m. The net cost was £8 million (equivalent to £218,500,000 in 2025).

In 1953 the Festival of Britain Office was abolished and its records were taken over by the Ministry of Works.

As well as the material legacy, the Festival gave rise to new traditions, in particular the performances of medieval mystery plays in York and Chester. There was an explosion of interest in these plays, regular performance of which have continued in those cities ever since.

In 2018 Prime Minister Theresa May announced that the government was planning a Festival of Great Britain and Northern Ireland, to be held in 2022. The proposed festival, which was intended to unite the United Kingdom after Brexit, was widely criticised as it coincided with centenary of the Irish Civil War and risked inflaming tensions in Northern Ireland. The graphic designer Richard Littler, creator of Scarfolk, created a satirical poster for the Festival based on the cover of the original 1951 guide, reimagining the profile of the nation's symbolic figurehead Britannia shooting herself in the head.

A conference celebrating the contribution of refugees (from Nazism) to the festival, was held to celebrate the seventy-fifth anniversary in 2026.

== Images of the Festival of Britain ==
Several images of the South Bank Exhibition can be found on the internet, including many released by The National Archives on the 60th anniversary of the festival.

A filmed retrospective of the South Bank Exhibition, Brief City (1952), with special reference to design and architecture, was made by Richard Massingham for The Observer newspaper. A film comedy, The Happy Family, was made about working-class resistance to the demolition that the festival required. The Festival is featured in the early portion of the film Prick up your Ears.

The archive of the Design Council held at the University of Brighton Design Archives includes several hundred images of the festival. They can be searched via the Visual Arts Data Service (VADS).

== See also ==
- Britain Can Make It, of 1946
- The Great Exhibition, of 1851
- World's fair
- List of world's fairs
- Saint Mungo Cup, football tournament in Glasgow held to coincide with the event
- Millennium Dome
