= Britain Can Make It =

1946 British exhibition

Coordinates: 51.496302°N 0.172078°W

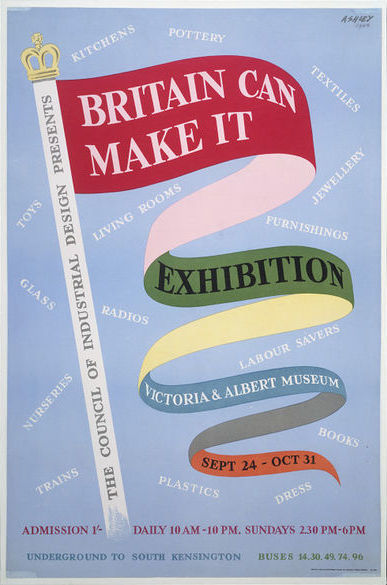
Britain Can Make It exhibition poster.

Britain Can Make It was an exhibition of industrial and product design held at the Victoria and Albert Museum in London in 1946. It was organised by the Council of Industrial Design, later to become the Design Council.

== Background ==
Even before the end of World War II, it was recognised that post-war reconstruction of manufacturing and international trade of exported goods would require the widespread acceptance of industrial design as part of future British manufacturing. Accordingly, the Council of Industrial Design was founded in 1944 by the Board of Trade, as one of the first quangos.

== The exhibition ==
In September 1945, only a month after the end of the war, the Council announced a national exhibition of design "in all the main range of consumer goods" to be held the following year. This was the 1946 Britain Can Make It exhibition, organized largely at the instigation of the Council's director, S.C. Leslie. The design of the exhibition itself was co-ordinated by Chief Display Designer, James Gardner. The exhibition was held from September to November at the Victoria and Albert Museum, London. Part of the reason for choosing this venue was that many of the museum's main exhibits were still in their wartime evacuation storage, outside London. The venue was undamaged by bombing, empty and available, and itself in need of an attraction to restore its pre-war visitors.

The event attracted one and a half million visitors and was officially opened by King George VI.

== "What Industrial Design Means" ==
Here is the Man
He solves all these questions
He decides what the eggcup shall look like
He is the Industrial Designer
He works with the Engineers, the
Factory Management – and is
influenced by what you want

—

A major theme of the exhibition was didactic, in particular the display "What Industrial Design Means" which had been the first major commission for Misha Black and the Design Research Unit. Through Black's display, "The Birth of an Egg Cup" the role of the designer was presented as the crucial interchange between all the various aspects of design and production. Rather than merely show-casing goods on offer, the exhibition, and this display in particular, were a propagandist attempt to highlight the need to update British approaches to product design if manufacturing was to be successful in post-war competition. The audience was two-fold: the general public who were as yet unused to the notion of design as a distinct process, and also the existing manufacturers who clung to pre-war, if not Victorian, notions of how to run manufacturing industry.

Black's design for the display was deliberately eye-catching, from a 13 feet high plaster egg at its entrance, to the continually-operating plastics moulding press making three thousand egg cups per day during the exhibition. This use of a working model in particular was commented on in surveys of exhibition visitors carried out by Mass Observation.

Another Design Research Unit exhibit was their design and scale model for a railway coach, a double-decked third class sleeper. This represented two innovations for Britain, indicative of this egalitarian age: the first sleeper for third class rather than first, and also the technical development of fitting two levels into the restricted British loading gauge by the use of a well car.

== Reactions to the exhibition ==
A popular reaction in the press was to term it, "Britain Can't Have It" as the country was still in the grip of wartime austerity measures and the goods on display were intended for export. Reactions of those attending the exhibition were varied between the general public, the design intelligentsia and the manufacturers. Critics', such as John Gloag's, reactions were highly positive, congratulating the exhibition organisers both on the intellectual quality of their exhibition and also for the achievement of producing it during such a time of austerity. The public's reaction was less sophisticated, but still positive. Their view was generally that of simply wanting products in the shops that they could actually buy. The only real criticisms came from established manufacturers who largely failed to appreciate the exhibition's attempt to emphasise design and who still judged it as a simple shop-window display, of their same pre-war products.

== See also ==
- Festival of Britain
