= Barbara Jones (artist) =

English painter

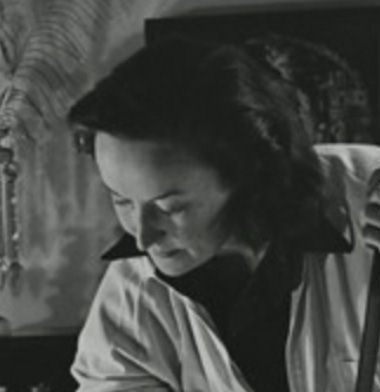
- Barbara Jones, 1947
- Born: 25 December 1912; Croydon, England
- Died: 28 August 1978 (aged 65)
- Education: Coloma Convent Girls' School, Croydon High School, Croydon Art School, Royal College of Art
- Known for: Artist, mural painter and writer

Barbara Mildred Jones (25 December 1912 – 28 August 1978) was an English artist, writer and mural painter. She is known for curating the exhibition Black Eyes and Lemonade (1951) and her books The Unsophisticated Arts (1951), and Follies and Grottoes (1953, expanded and reissued 1974, 1989).

== Early life and education ==
Barbara Jones was born in Croydon, Surrey. She was an only child. Her father had a saddlery and harness business at a time when Croydon was still a rural suburb. Her first sketchbooks were filled with horses and farm machinery. Her background was a comfortable, middle class one. She attended Coloma Convent Girls' School, Croydon High School, from May 1924 to July 1930, and then Croydon Art School, [1931-1933]. From Croydon she went on to the Department of Engraving at the Royal College of Art but felt unsuited so transferred to the Department of Mural Decoration in her second year. She was taught by the likes of Eric Ravilious and Edward Bawden. She graduated in 1937. An exceptional survival of work from this period has been restored at the University of London’s Senate House, where Jones, with four other students from the Royal College of Art, created a painted ceiling in 1936. Jones wrote about the project in her Water-Colour Painting (1960). She sought commissions but realised that building up work to be free-lance would take time so took a part-time teaching post. Following the outbreak of the Second World War she accompanied the school where she was teaching on its evacuation to Luton.

== Early career ==
During the Second World War, Jones was associated with the Recording Britain project of the Pilgrim Trust ; the War Artists' Advisory Committee also purchased a work by her. The Architectural Press commissioned her to illustrate a booklet, Bombed Churches as War Memorials (1945) and Jones was further asked to write illustrated articles for the Architectural Press's Architectural Review.

After the war, Jones created murals for the 1946 Britain Can Make It exhibition, and the 1947 Enterprise Scotland exhibition She also worked for P&O, creating murals for the passenger liner ships Orcades, Oronsay, Orsova and Oriana, as well as for hotels, restaurants, exhibitions and schools.

Jones also worked on the children's television series The Woodentops. Most of the works, because of the nature of where they were created, have now disappeared. However many books containing her artwork remain, in the form of dust-jackets and illustrations.

== Black Eyes and Lemonade ==
In 1951 Jones co-curated (with Tom Ingram) Black Eyes and Lemonade, an exhibition of craft, folk, and popular objects at the Whitechapel Gallery. Originally, the idea for the exhibition was proposed by the Society for Education in Art (SEA) to explore the qualities of folk art in Britain and its value in art education and was to be titled "British Popular Art". However, the project that Jones planned put folk art in dialogue with consumer objects—some of which were mass-produced—to explore the "bold and fizzy" characteristics of contemporary popular art in Britain at that time. In this way, Black Eyes and Lemonade, amongst other work by Jones, made public many of the ideas that would later become important for the emergence of pop art in Britain. Objects displayed in the exhibition included horse brasses, corn dollies, canal boat artwork, ship's figureheads, and the outfits of Pearly Kings and Queens, alongside more contemporary cultural artefacts including the Idris Talking Lemon, beer mats, pest control adverts and shop posters.

== Artistic networks ==
Jones was a Fellow of the Society of Industrial Artists (SIA), editing the society's journal from 1951—1953. In 1969 she was made the society's Vice-President. She was also a Fellow of the Royal Anthropological Institute and a member of the Society of Authors.

She was said to belong to that group of Royal College of Art artists and illustrators, more well-known than she, who were her contemporaries: John Piper, Edward Bawden, Eric Ravilious and Edward Ardizzone. When she was at Croydon High School she made friends with a girl called Joyce Drew who became architect and town planner Jane Drew, and it seems they influenced each other in their careers.

In 1941 (9 April, at Luton Registry Office), Jones married the artist Clifford Barry, whom she had met while at the Royal College of Art.

By the end of the war they had moved back to London, first to Croydon, then to Hampstead, first living at Sheriff Road, and ultimately at 2 Well Walk, which was to be Jones's base for the rest of her life. A five floor property, overlooking Burgh House, the house provided "a space for projecting her personality, for building an environment in which she felt free and creative to develop herself and her art without the constraints of 'convention' or 'good taste'."

Over the decades Jones lived in, and let out, various parts of the house. By the late 1960s she had had a two-floor studio built in the garden and lived in the basement of the house.

Jones's marriage to Clifford Barry did not last, both seeking other partners. Barry moved out of the Hampstead home and Tom Ingram replaced him. Ingram was cited in the 1951 divorce. Jones remained close to Clifford Barry, who took up residence in nearby Belsize Park.

== Publications ==
- Jones, Barbara: The Isle of Wight illustrated and described by Barbara Jones, Harmondsworth: Penguin Books, 1950.
- Jones, Barbara: Follies and Grottoes, London: Constable & Co., 1953.
- Jones, Barbara: English Furniture at a glance written and illustrated by Barbara Jones, London: Architectural Press, 1954.
- Jones, Barbara: Water-Colour Painting, London: Adam & Charles Black, 1960.
- Jones, Barbara: The Unsophisticated Arts, London: Architectural Press, 1951.
- Braybrooke, June & Jones, Barbara: Isobel English, London: Max Parrish & Co., 1964.
- Jones, Barbara: Design for Death, London: Andre Deutsch, 1967.
- Jones, Barbara: Twit and Howlet and the Balloon, London: Longman Young Books, 1970.
- Jones, Barbara & Howell, Bill: Popular Arts of the First World War, London: Studio Vista, 1972. Review
- Jones, Barbara & Ouellette, William: Erotic Postcards, London: Macdonald & Jane's Publishers, 1977.

== List of exhibitions and sales ==
In 1999 the Katharine House Gallery in Marlborough held a sale of her studio works.

== Notes, references and sources ==
Sources

- Barbara Jones at Ash Rare Books Barbara Jones: The B. C. Bloomfield Collection.
- Bloomfield, B. C., The Life and Work of Barbara Jones. The Private Library. 5th Series. Vol. 2:3. Autumn 1999. Published by The Private Libraries Association, 1999. The Autumn 1999 issue of the periodical contains B. C. Bloomfield's article "The Life and Work of Barbara Jones (1912-1978)", accompanied by his checklist of her books, her illustrations and contributions to books and periodicals, her dust-jackets, her ephemera, with details of her interviews, lithographs, murals, posters and radio broadcasts. Based on his Presidential Lecture to the Association, and with over 60 numbered slides of items in the collection used to illustrate that lecture.
