= Design Council =

British organization

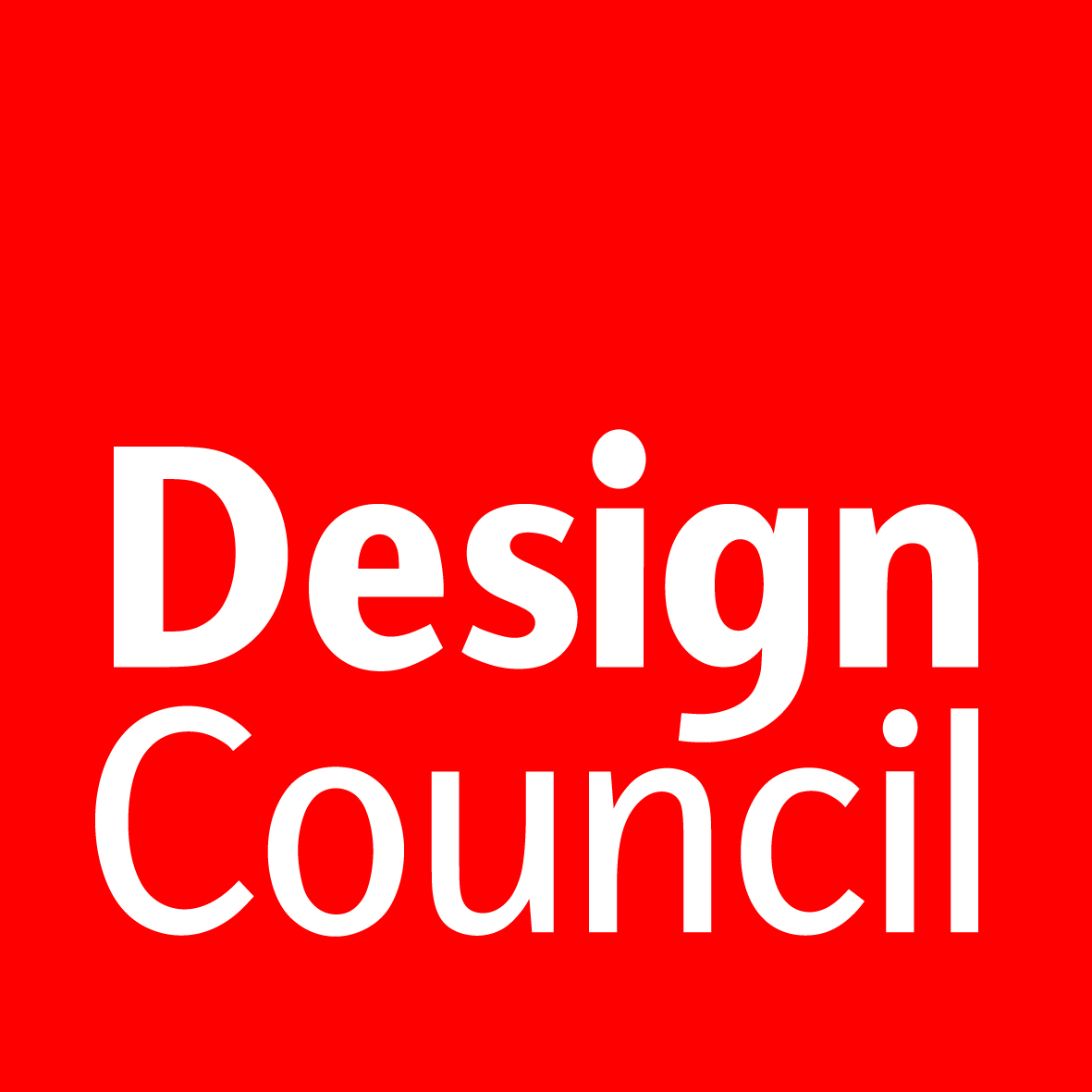
- Founded: 19 December 1944
- Founder: Hugh Dalton
- Registration no.: 272099
- Location: The Design Council c/o Sayer Vincent, Invicta House, 108–114 Golden Lane, London EC1Y 0TL
- Region served: United Kingdom
- Services: The UK's national champion for design.
- Method: harness design to drive business growth and improve service efficiency; design practical solutions to complex problems; create better, more sustainable places; lead and share the latest thinking on design
- Key people: CEO Minnie Moll (since 2021)
- Subsidiaries: Commission for Architecture and the Built Environment, Design Council Enterprises Limited
- Revenue: £8,855,000
- Expenses: £8,649,000
- Employees: 59
- Volunteers: 0
- Website: designcouncil.org.uk
- Formerly called: Council of Industrial Design

The Design Council, formerly the Council of Industrial Design, is a United Kingdom charity incorporated by royal charter. Its stated mission is "to be the UK's national champion for design". It was instrumental in the promotion of the concept of inclusive design.

The Design Council's archive is located at the University of Brighton Design Archives.

The Design Council operates two subsidiaries, the Design Council Commission for Architecture and the Built Environment (Design Council CABE) and Design Council Enterprises Limited.

== The Commission for Architecture and the Built Environment ==
The Design Council Commission for Architecture and the Built Environment (DC CABE, alternatively Design Council CABE, CABE at the Design Council, or simply CABE), is one of Design Council's two subsidiaries. It supports communities, local authorities and developers involved in built environment projects by providing services in three areas: design review, customised expert support, and training and continued professional development (CPD). These services are supported by a network of Built Environment Experts (BEEs), a multidisciplinary team of 250 experts from "architecture, planning and infrastructure backgrounds, as well as academics, health specialists, and community engagement workers".

Design Council CABE, which is intended to operate as a self-sustaining business, was formed on 1 April 2011 with about 20 staff from the original CABE after it was merged with the Design Council. The BEE network was formed in 2012.

== History ==
The Design Council began on 19 December 1944 as the Council of Industrial Design (COID), founded by Hugh Dalton, President of the Board of Trade in the wartime Government. Its objective was 'to promote by all practicable means the improvement of design in the products of British industry'.

S. C. Leslie, the council's first director, played an important part in the Britain Can Make It exhibition of 1946. His 1947 successor Sir Gordon Russell established the organisational model for the next 40 years. Under Sir Paul Reilly the organisation changed its name to the Design Council in 1972.

The Design Council was incorporated as a registered charity by royal charter in 1976, although it continued to operate as a non-departmental public body.

In December 1994 it was restructured, resulting in a functional change from being both an advisory body and a provider of goods and services to a primarily strategic mission "to inspire the best use of design by the United Kingdom in the world context, in order to improve prosperity and wellbeing".

On 1 April 2010 it incorporated a subsidiary trading company called Design Council Enterprises Limited to transact "fundraising activities that are not primary-purpose charitable activity."

On 1 April 2011, it ceased to be a non-departmental public body of the Department for Business, Innovation and Skills and became an independent registered charity, although it continued to receive grants from the department. It also officially merged with the Commission for Architecture and the Built Environment (CABE) on the same day.

In 2017, Design Council appointed Sarah Weir (OBE) as their CEO.

=== The Design Centre ===
Sir Gordon Russell, who was heavily involved in the 1951 Festival of Britain, examined ways to reform the education and training of new industrial designers. The Design Centre, in London's Haymarket, was officially opened on 26 April 1956.

The Council under Russell combined exhibitions with product endorsements, direct services to industry, commercial publishing and retail.

After the Design Council's restructuring in 1994, the Design Centre was closed to the public. The Design Council continued to operate from the Design Centre until 1998.

=== The Design journal ===
Between 1949 and 1999, the Design Council published Design (ISSN 0011-9245), a "well-regarded magazine of its own" The journal ceased publication after the summer issue of 1999.

=== The Design for Planet mission ===
In 2021, Minnie Moll introduced a new mission to the Design Council called Design for Planet.

The mission aims to galvanise and support the 1.97 million people working in the UK's design economy to help address the climate crisis and achieve net zero and beyond, making design regenerative, not extractive.

== Awards given ==
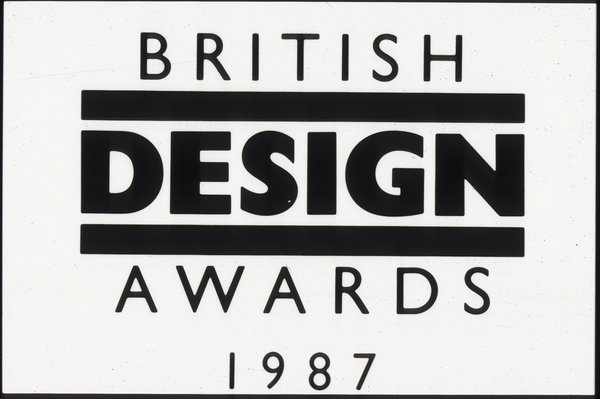
British Design Awards logo

The council has hosted the British Design Awards, with the 1987 logo rights co-owned with Manchester Metropolitan University. It was suggested in 1995 in Business Strategy Review magazine that the awards made suitable benchmarks, contributing to industrial competitiveness.

== See also ==
- Chartered Society of Designers
- Design Museum
- List of design museums
- London Design Medals
- Prince Philip Designers Prize
- Royal Designers for Industry
- Royal Institute of British Architects
