= College of Medallists =

Organisation

- Purpose: Design Education
- Parent organization: Royal Commission for the Exhibition of 1851

The College of Medallists is an association of recipients of The Sir Misha Black Medal for Distinguished Services in Design Education. Misha Black (1910–1977) was a pioneer of design in Britain. The College of Medallists was established in 2000, and joined the Founding Bodies (the Design and Industries Association, the Royal College of Art (RCA), the Faculty of Royal Designers for Industry (RDI) at the Royal Society of Arts (RSA), and the Royal Academy of Engineering) in supporting the Sir Misha Black Awards. In 2020, the College of Medallists became part of the Royal Commission for the Exhibition of 1851, with the Imperial College of London as a founding body.

== Sir Misha Black Awards Committee ==
The Sir Misha Black Awards Committee comprises:

- Malcolm Garrett (chairman) – RSA Faculty of Royal Designers for Industry
- Peter Childs – Imperial College London
- P John Clarkson – Royal Academy of Engineering
- Geoffrey Kirk – College of Medallists
- Chris Wise - Royal Commission for the Exhibition of 1851
- Nick de León – Co-opted Member

== Medal recipients ==
| Year | Name | Country | Biography |
|---|---|---|---|
| 2025 | William Ion | UK | |
| 2025 | Lady Helen Hamlyn | UK | |
| 2024 | Patricia Moore | USA | |
| 2024 | Mary V Mullin (Honorary) | Ireland | |
| 2023 | Marie Redmond | Ireland | |
| 2022 | Elizabeth Tunstall | Canada | |
| 2021 | Don Norman | USA | Norman is Distinguished Professor Emeritus of Cognitive Sciences and Founding Director of the Design Lab at the University of California. |
| 2020 | Birgit Mager | Germany | Mager is the first ever Professor of Service Design at the Cologne University of Applied Sciences. |
| 2018 | P John Clarkson | UK | Clarkson takes a ground-breaking approach in the modelling of design processes and change propagation within complex systems. |
| 2016 | Margaret Calvert | UK | Calvert is best known for her pioneering work with Jock Kinneir designing the UK's road signage system. |
| 2015 | Ravi Naidoo | South Africa | Naidoo is the founder and managing director of Interactive Africa. In 1995, he founded Design Indaba, an annual international design conference in Cape Town. |
| 2014 | Michael Twyman | UK | In 1968, Twyman founded the department of typography and graphic communication at the University of Reading. |
| 2013 | Santiago Aránguiz Sánchez | Chile | Sánchez is the dean of the school of design at Universidad del Pacifico. |
| 2012 | Ezio Manzini | Italy | Manzini is a design researcher, writer, and educator. |
| 2011 | Kumar Vyas | India | Vyas is a designer and educator. |
| 2009 | Judy Frater | India, US | Frater is the founder of the Kala Raksha school, dedicated to preserving and advancing Indian craft. |
| 2008 | Gonzalo Tassier | Mexico | Tassier is a graphic designer and publicity specialist from Mexico City. |
| 2007 | Alison Chitty | UK | Chitty is a production designer and set and costume designer who has won an Olivier Award. She has collaborated with Mike Leigh, Francesca Zambello and Peter Hall. |
| 2006 | Geoffrey Kirk | UK | Geoffrey Kirk is a designer who has worked for Rolls-Royce. |
| 2005 | David M. Kelley | US | Kelley is an American businessman, entrepreneur, designer, engineer and teacher. He is founder, chairman and managing partner of the design firm IDEO and a professor at Stanford University. |
| 2004 | Elaine Ostroff | US | In 1992, Ostroff established the Universal Design Education Project, an inter-varsity project in design. She introduced similar schemes to Europe and Asia. |
| 2004 | David Hamilton (Honorary) | UK | Hamilton was employed in the faculty of the Royal College of Art in the field of ceramic art. |
| 2003 | Christopher Frayling | UK | Frayling is a British educationalist and writer, and former rector of the Royal College of Art, known also for his studies of popular culture. |
| 2002 | Santiago Calatrava | Spain | Calatrava is a Spanish architect, sculptor and structural engineer. |
| 2001 | Yuri Soloviev | Russia | Soloviev was a Russian designer, editor and director of the Architecture and Art Bureau. |
| 2000 | Robert Godden | UK | Godden was British designer prominent in the British design movements following World War II. |
| 2000 | Richard Guyatt | UK | Guyatt was a British graphic designer who played a key role in 20th century graphic design. |
| 1999 | Ettore Sottsass | Italy | Sottsass was an Italian architect and designer of the late 20th century. |
| 1998 | William Walsh | Ireland | Walsh was an important figure in design in Ireland from the early 1960s to the late 1980s. |
| 1997 | Alex Moulton | UK | Moulton was a designer in the field of rubber suspension systems for cars and bicycles. |
| 1995 | Kenji Ekuan | Japan | Ekuan was a prominent Japanese designer who was head of Design for the World, the Japan Industrial Designers Association and the International Council of Societies of Industrial Design. He was a founding member of the group that became GK Design. |
| 1993 | Arthur Pulos | US | Pulos was an industrial designer, author and educator was chairman of the department of design at Syracuse University. |
| 1993 | Marianne Straub | UK | Straub was a textile designer of the 1940s, 50s and 60s in Britain. |
| 1991 | David Pye | UK | Pye was a member of the faculty of the Royal College of Art. |
| 1988 | Peter Reyner Banham | UK | Banham was an English architectural critic and writer of the treatise Theory and Design in the First Machine Age (1960) and Los Angeles: The Architecture of Four Ecologies. (1971) |
| 1986 | Frank Height | UK | Height was an industrial designer and educator who was a member of the faculty of the Royal College of Art in the field of industrial design. |
| 1985 | Ashoke Chatterjee | India | From 1975 to 1985, Chatterjee was executive director of the National Institute of Design (NID), Ahmedabad. |
| 1982 | Max Bill | Switzerland | Bill was a Swiss architect, artist, painter, typeface designer, industrial designer and graphic designer. |
| 1980 | Serge Ivan Chermayeff | US | Chermayeff was a Russian born, British architect, industrial designer, writer and co-founder of the American Society of Planners and Architects. |
| 1978 | William Coldstream | UK | Coldstream was a British realist painter and art teacher. |
