= Sir Misha Black Awards =

Award for design education in the United Kingdom

The Sir Misha Black Awards
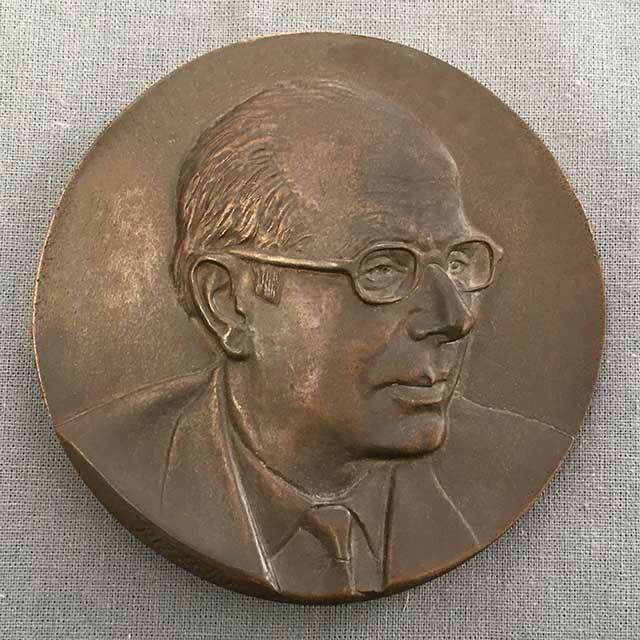
- Sir Misha Black Medal

The Sir Misha Black Awards, established in 1978, is a British award for design education, in memory of Misha Black. Two annual awards are conferred:

- The Sir Misha Black Medal for Distinguished Services to Design Education, awarded to individual design educators worldwide.
- The Sir Misha Black Award for Innovation in Design Education, granted to UK-based educational institutions, organisations, or individuals.

The awards were set up in 1977 by six bodies: the Design and Industries Association, Imperial College London, the Faculty of Royal Designers for Industry (R.D.I.) at the Royal Society of Arts (RSA), the Royal Academy of Engineering, the College of Medallists, and the Royal Commission for the Exhibition of 1851.

Since 2020, the Sir Misha Black Awards has been included in the Royal Commission's portfolio, as part of the commission's aim to "increase the means of industrial education and extend the influence of science and art upon productive industry."

== The Sir Misha Black Medal ==
First awarded in 1978, the Sir Misha Black Medal recognises individuals worldwide who have made outstanding and lasting contributions to design education. The medal is conferred by a committee representing leading British design organisations, and each recipient is admitted to the College of Medallists.

== The Sir Misha Black Award ==
First presented in 1999, the Sir Misha Black Award for Innovation in Design Education recognises teachers, teams, departments, or courses within United Kingdom–based educational institutions that have demonstrated significant innovation in design education. The award specifically honours contributions that advance and transform the practice of design education in the UK.

== Sir Misha Black Awards Committee ==
The Sir Misha Black Awards Committee is composed of representatives from the founding bodies:

- Royal Designers for Industry (RDI)
- Royal Academy of Engineering (RAEng)
- College of Medallists
- Imperial College London
- Royal Commission for the Exhibition of 1851.

Members include Malcolm Garrett (chairman) – RSA Faculty of Royal Designers for Industry, and Chris Wise, Royal Commission for the Exhibition of 1851.

== Recipients of the Sir Misha Black Medal ==
Year	Name	Country
1978	Sir William Coldstream	UK
1980	Serge Ivan Chermayeff	USA
1982	Max Bill	Switzerland
1985	Ashoke Chatterjee	India
1986	Frank Height	UK
1988	Peter Reyner Banham	UK
1991	David Pye	UK
1993	Dr. Marianne Straub RDI	Switzerland
1993	Arthur Pulos	USA
1995	Kenji Ekuan	Japan
1997	Dr. Alexander Moulton RDI	UK
1998	William Walsh	Ireland
1999	Ettore Sottsass	Italy
2000	Robert Goodden	UK
2001	Yuri Soloviev	Russia
2002	Dr Santiago Calatrava	Spain
2003	Sir Christopher Frayling	UK
2004	David Hamilton (Honorary)	UK
2004	Elaine Ostroff	USA
2005	Prof. David Kelley	USA
2006	Prof. Geoffrey Kirk RDI	UK
2007	Alison Chitty RDI	UK
2008	Prof. Gonzalo Tassier	Mexico
2009	Judy Frater	India/USA
2011	Prof. Kumar Vyas	India
2012	Prof. Ezio Manzini	Italy
2013	Prof. Santiago Aránguiz Sánchez	Chile
2014	Prof. Michael Twyman	UK
2015	Ravi Naidoo	South Africa
2016	Margaret Calvert OBE RDI	UK
2018	Prof. P John Clarkson	UK
2020	Prof. Birgit Mager	Germany
2021	Prof. Don Norman	USA
2022	Prof. Elizabeth Tunstall	Canada
2023	Prof. Marie Redmond	Ireland
2024	Mary V Mullin (Honorary)	Ireland
2024	Dr. Patricia Moore	USA
2025	Lady Helen Hamlyn CBE	UK
2025	Prof. William Ion	Uk

== Recipients of The Sir Misha Black Award ==
Year	Name
1999	Professor Norman McNally
2001	Prof. Roger Coleman and Dr Paul Ewing – Royal College of Art / Imperial College, London
2002	Prof. Ken Wallace – Cambridge University
2003	Prof. Adrian Forty
2004	Jane McCann – University of Derby
2006	Design Against Crime Research Centre – Central St Martins School of Art
2007	Department of Industrial Design – Coventry University School of Art & Design
2009	Prof. Anthony Dunne – Royal College of Art
2011	Creative Research into Sound Arts Practice (CRiSAP) – London College of Communication
2012	Manchester School of Art – Manchester Metropolitan University
2014	National Art&Design Saturday Club – The Sorrell Foundation
2015	Prof. Rachel Cooper OBE - Lancaster University
2016	Prof. Catherine McDermott
2016	Arts University Bournemouth
2018	University of Brighton Design Archives
2020	FixEd – Dee Halligan & Prof. Daniel Charny
2020	Oliver Broadbent
2022	Judah Armani
2023	Haleh Moravej – MetMUnch
2024	Zowie Broach
2025	Victoria Thornton OBE
