= Richard Guyatt =

British designer and academic

Professor Richard Guyatt (1914–2007) was a British designer and academic who has been described as "one of the 20th century's most seminal figures in the world of graphic design". He was the youngest ever professor at the Royal College of Art on appointment in 1948, and was Rector of the Royal College of Art from 1978–1981. He worked for the Royal College of Art for 34 years, and also acted as consultant designer to Wedgwood, WH Smith and other British companies. Guyatt created coins for the Royal Mint and designed postage stamps for the Royal Mail. He was made a CBE in 1969.

For the 1951 Festival of Britain, he co-designed the Lion and the Unicorn Pavilion.

Sir Hugh Casson wrote on Guyatt's retirement from the Royal College of Art in 1981, ". . . all his life Dick Guyatt has readily accepted and punctiliously dealt with teaching, designing, consulting, illustrating, lecturing, administrating; bringing to each problem, however small, that same quality of the true professional, the ruthless determination to achieve by rational methods aims that have been conceived in passion."

In 2000 he was awarded the Sir Misha Black award and was added to the College of Medallists.

Gerald Beckwith, writing in The Independent after Guyatt's death, said "He was one of our last remaining examples of a genuine Edwardian gentleman, to whom the qualities of duty, fidelity, truthfulness and manners were paramount. To the end he practised all these with a lightness and impeccability of style entirely his own."

== Book ==
- Two Lectures. Royal College of Art: ISBN 0-902490-25-7
