= ICSID =

ICSID may refer to:

- International Centre for Settlement of Investment Disputes
- International Council of Societies of Industrial Design
