= Michael Twyman =

British historian (1934–2025)

Michael Loton Twyman (15 July 1934 – 26 October 2025) was a British historian who was Professor Emeritus of the Department of Typography & Graphic Communication at the University of Reading. He joined the university staff in 1959. Twyman established a BA (Hons) course in Typography & Graphic Communication which eventually grew into its own department in 1974. Both the programme and the department are widely acknowledged to be the first of their kind in the world. He retired from full-time teaching in 1998 but continued to teach postgraduate students and was Director of the Centre for Ephemera Studies.

He was a visiting teacher at Rare Book Schools in Virginia, Lyon, Wellington and Melbourne. For many years he served as Vice-President of the Printing Historical Society and in 2016 he succeeded Asa Briggs as President of the Ephemera Society.

Twyman is often cited for his works on the history of printing and ephemera, especially lithography. In addition, he is well known for his writings on the theory of graphic language. He also completed and edited Maurice Rickards' book Encyclopedia of Ephemera (London: British Library, 2000). He was an early member of the Printing Historical Society and has edited and contributed to issues of its Journal.

In 1983 he was awarded the Samuel Pepys Medal for his Outstanding Contribution to Ephemera Studies, and in 2014 the Sir Misha Black award and was added to the College of Medallists. In 2021 he received the Gold Medal of The Bibliographical Society for distinguished services to bibliography.

A bibliography of the publications of Michael Twyman was published in the Journal of the Printing Historical Society' in Third Series 5 (2024).

== Early life and education ==
Twyman was born to parents Lawrence and Gladys and grew up in Chingford. Twyman attended Sir George Monoux Grammar School. He was evacuated to Broadway, Worcestershire during World War II. Twyman graduated with a degree in fine art from the University of Reading in 1957 and earned a scholarship to research the history of lithography. He earned a teaching qualification at Cambridge University in 1959 before returning to Reading for a PhD.

== Personal life ==
In 1957, Twyman married Nin Andrews. The couple had two sons and a daughter.

Twyman died on 26 October 2025, at the age of 91.

== Selected works ==
- (1966) "John Soulby, Printer, Ulverston: A Study of the Work Printed by John Soulby, Father and Son, Between 1796 and 1827".
- (1967) "The lithographic hand press 1796–1850", Journal of the Printing Historical Society, no. 3
- (1970) Printing 1770–1970: an illustrated history of its development and uses in England. Eyre & Spottiswoode, London
- (1970) Lithography 1800-1850. OUP, London
- (1973) "Lithographic stone and the printing trade in the nineteenth-century", Journal of the Printing Historical Society, no. 8
- (1979) "A Schema for the Study of Graphic Language", in The Processing of Visible Language, (eds, Kolers, P.A., Wrolstad, M.E. & Bouma, H.) Plenum, New York
- (1982) "The Graphic Presentation of Language", Information Design Journal 3(1)
- (1985) "Using Pictorial Language: A Discussion of the Dimensions of the Problem", in Designing Usable Texts, (eds, Thomas Duffy & Robert Waller), Academic Press, Orlando.
- (1988) "Charles Joseph Hullmandel: lithographic printer extraordinary", in Gilmour, P. (ed.), Lasting impressions, Canberra, Australian National Gallery
- (1990) Early Lithographed Books: a study of the design and production of improper books in the age of the hand press. Farrand, London.
- (1993) "The bold idea: the use of bold-looking types in the nineteenth century", Journal of the Printing Historical Society, no. 22
- (1996) Early Lithographed Music: a study based on the H. Baron collection. Farrand, London.
- (1998) The British Library Guide to Printing: history and techniques. British Library, London.
- (2000) Breaking the Mould: the first hundred years of lithography. British Library, London.
- (2007) Images en couleur. Godefroy Engelmann, Charles Hullmandel et les débuts de la chromolithographie. Musée de l'imprimerie, Lyon
- (2008) "The long-term significance of printed ephemera", RBM: A journal of rare books, manuscripts, and cultural heritage, vol. 9, no. 1, Spring
- (2013) A history of chromolithography: printed colour for all. British Library and Printing Historical Society, London.
- (2024) Reproducing The Bayeux Tapestry over three centuries. Printing Historical Society, London. ISBN 978-0-900003-19-6

== Sources ==
- Staff pages of the Department of Typography & Graphic Communication Accessed 13 April 2007.
- Interview with Michael Twyman at www.letterspace.com Accessed 13 April 2007.
- "Michael Twyman: a checklist of the published writings", Bulletin 45, Summer 1998, Printing Historical Society, pp 7–9.
- "Supplement to the checklist of Michael Twyman's published writings, 1996–1998", Journal of the Printing Historical Society, new series number 17, 2011, pp 49–51.
