= Bruno Newman =

Mexican businessman

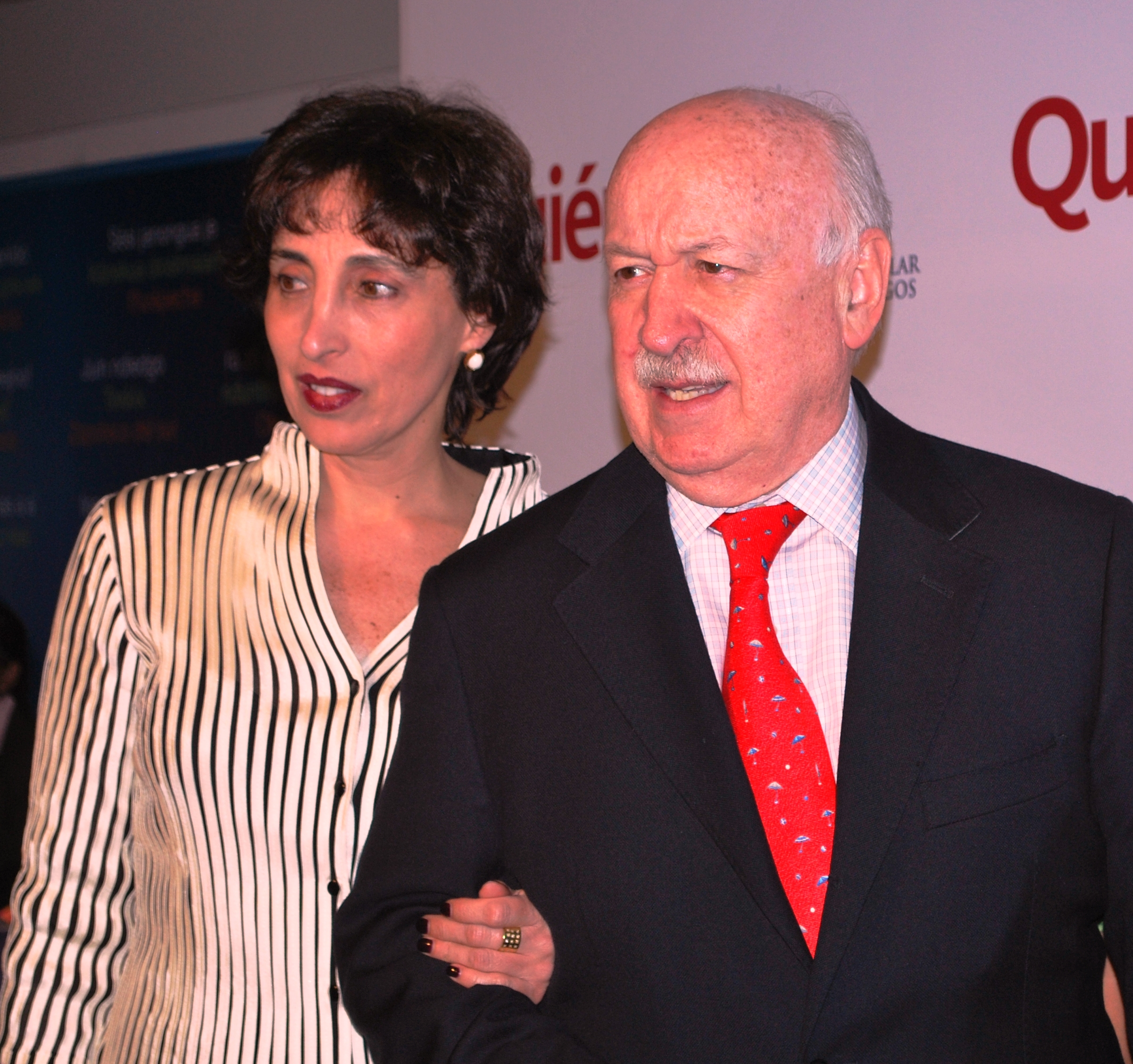
Newman with partner at the sixth anniversary celebration of the Museo de Arte Popular in 2012

Bruno Newman is a businessman from Mexico City. He is the founder and co director of Zimat Consultores, a publisher, photographer and the founder of the Museo del Objeto del Objeto (MODO).

== Career ==
Newman has a bachelor's degree in communications from the Universidad Iberoamericana. He has worked in communications and human resources in both the public and private sectors. He has been a consultant to a number of businesses, cultural institutions, philanthropic organizations and professional associations.

In 1984, Newman founded Zimat Consultores, a large communication firm in Mexico City, which he still runs with partner Marta Mejía. Zimat benefitted from the boom in public relations in Mexico in the 1980s and 1990s, with the company quickly grew from five employees to more than sixty consultants that made the agency number one in Mexico in terms of billing by the end of the 1990s. The firm merged with U.S. enterprise Golin/Harris, giving the cooperation access to markets in Mexico, other parts of the Latin America and Spanish speaking markets in the United States. In the early 2000s, the firm was acquired by Interpublic Group of Companies, but today it is again independent and the exclusive partner for the Interpublic Group in Mexico. Newman has remained as director of Zimat. Today, clients include Avon, Body Shop, BBVA Bancomer, Cemex, Cuauhtémoc Moctezuma Brewery, Cinépolis, Colgate, Fondo Mexicano para la Conservación de la Naturaleza, Grupo Bimbo, Hewlett Packard and HSBC.

In addition to his work with Zimat, Newman is an author and photographer, publishing work related to his field as well as his personal interest in the ordinary. He published Organizaciones en la mira. Comunicación estratégica para prevenir y manejar las crisis with Marta Mejía in 2009. In Paris, he took 450 photographs, eighty of which were published in a book called "El banquete del las banquetas." The idea to photograph the city, focusing on sidewalks, occurred while he was there with his wife and was attracted by a metallic hatch which had an interesting texture due to the loss of paint.

He has received a number of recognitions for his professional and philanthropic work. He is the first from Latin America to have been accredited by the International Association of Business Communicators (IABC). He was the founder and first president of the Asociación Mexicana de Comunicación Organizacional (AMCO) in 1973, president of SIGNUM in 1992, president of PRO RP and the Asociación Mexicana de Agencias Profesionales de Relaciones Públicas, AC in 1997. Newman is a member of the board the Consejo Mexicano para la Filantropia (Cemefi), and president of A Leer/IBBY México, which promotes literacy in the country.

== As a collector and founder of MODO ==
Bruno Newman is a longtime collector, mostly of packaging and ordinary objects. He has a collection of over 30,000 objects in thirty categories such as household products, food packages, medicine bottles, cosmetics and toys. Newman began collecting when he was thirteen years old. His uncle collected stamps and he was inspired by these stamp albums. He began collecting stamps from Spain, England and Mexico, preferring the Mexican ones because of their designs, especially the old ones. Collecting packaging and other pieces for their designs began with four or five containers from a line of beauty products called Pompeii. They had been imported from France in 1910 and when he displayed them on a table, he received positive comments. From then he went on to shaving supplies, old toys, old advertisements and more, mostly bought at local flea markets. He concentrated on items that were not considered collectibles, but rather on items that caught his attraction because of age, color, the slogans and/or the designs. Over his lifetime, the collection outgrew his room, house and office until he had three warehouses for the collection. Today, he still collects, going to flea markets on Saturdays.

In 2010, Newman made the collection the base for a new museum dedicated to design and communication called Museo del Objeto del Objeto (Object of the Object Museum). He opened this museum in Colonia Roma of Mexico City, in a 1906 Art Nouveau building that used to be his home. The museum collection has about 30,000 pieces that date from 1810 to the present. They are mostly everyday objects from product packaging, utensils, cosmetics, clothing and many others. Only a small fraction of the collection is on display at the museum at any time.

La Gunilla is the editorial arm of the Museo del Objeto del Objeto. Newman created this enterprise with partner Gonzalo Tassier, to publish works focused on design and collecting. The name is a play on the name Lagunilla, which has a famous market for collectors. Books published by this organization include "Mextencil" by Edgar Vargas and "Arte Urbe" by Flavio Montessoro focused on "urban" or "street" art, mostly graffiti and stencil art. La Gunilla has also published works by Newman and Tassier, as part of a series of books called "Con-juntos." Two of the books in this series, a "Una gruesa de colecciones" and "Encuentros con conocidos" both focus on Newman's personal experience as a collector.
