= Max Black =

British-American philosopher (1909–1988)

- Born: Max Tcherny; February 24, 1909; Baku, Baku Governorate, Russian Empire (now Azerbaijan)
- Died: August 27, 1988 (aged 79); Ithaca, New York, U.S.
- Citizenship: American (from 1948)

Education
- Education: Queens' College, Cambridge; University of London (PhD, 1939)
- Academic advisor: Ludwig Wittgenstein

Philosophical work
- Era: 20th-century philosophy
- Region: Western philosophy
- School: Analytic philosophy
- Institutions: University of Göttingen; University College London; University of Illinois; Cornell University
- Doctoral students: Keith Donnellan
- Notable students: John Perry
- Main interests: Philosophy of language Philosophy of mathematics Philosophy of science Philosophy of art
- Notable works: "The Identity of Indiscernibles"
- Notable ideas: Criticism of Leibniz' law Interaction theory of metaphor

Max Black (February 24, 1909 – August 27, 1988) was a Russian-born British-American philosopher who was a leading figure in analytic philosophy in the years after World War II. He made contributions to the philosophy of language, the philosophy of mathematics and science, and the philosophy of art, also publishing studies of the work of philosophers such as Frege. His translation (with Peter Geach) of Frege's published philosophical writing is a classic text.

== Early life and education ==
Black was born Max Tcherny on February 24, 1909, in Baku, then within the Russian Empire and now the capital of Azerbaijan, to a wealthy Jewish family. The family left Baku whilst he was very young, emigrating to England in 1912 after spending a short time in Paris, France. The family name was changed to Black (a direct translation of "Tcherny") in 1911 or 1912. His younger brothers Misha and Sam became, respectively, a designer and a public relations manager

He first attended a free school in north London, but at age nine was awarded a scholarship to Dame Alice Owen's School, where he remained until the age of eighteen.

He studied mathematics at Queens' College at the University of Cambridge, where he was drawn to analytic philosophy. Bertrand Russell, Ludwig Wittgenstein, G. E. Moore, and Frank P. Ramsey were all at Cambridge at that time and were influential on much of Black's later thought.

He graduated in 1930, and was awarded a fellowship for research at the University of Göttingen for a year.

== Career ==
From 1931 to 1936, Black was mathematics master at the Royal Grammar School, Newcastle.

His first book was The Nature of Mathematics (1933), a critical exposition of Principia Mathematica and a critical analysis of the formalist and intuitionist schools of mathematics.

Black lectured in mathematics at the Institute of Education in London from 1936 to 1940. During this time he also undertook graduate work at the University of London, being awarded a Ph.D. in 1939 for his dissertation on theories of logical positivism.

In 1940 he moved to the United States and joined the Philosophy Department at the University of Illinois at Urbana–Champaign. In 1946, he accepted a professorship in philosophy at Cornell University. In 1948, he became a naturalized citizen of the United States.

Black became the Susan Linn Sage Professor of Philosophy and Humane Letters at Cornell in 1954, a position he held until his retirement in 1978. He served as President of the Eastern Division of the American Philosophical Association in 1958–1959 and as President of the International Institute of Philosophy 1981– 1984.

He was elected a Fellow of the American Academy of Arts and Sciences in 1963.

Amongst the PhD dissertations he supervised was that of novelist William H. Gass.

== Death and family ==
Black was the elder brother of the architect Misha Black and the public relations manager Sam Black.

In 1933 he married Michal (or Mabel) Landesberg (1911–1985) with whom he had a daughter and a son.

Black died in Ithaca, New York age 79, from a heart attack that followed surgery for cancer.

== Philosophical contributions ==
Black made notable contributions to the metaphysics of identity. In a 1952 paper, Black presents an objection to Leibniz' law – the principle of the identity of indiscernibles that states that no two distinct things can exactly resemble each other. He does so, as Peter Forrest notes, by suggesting "there could be a universe containing nothing but two exactly resembling spheres" and that in "such a completely symmetrical universe the two spheres would be indiscernible".

He is also known for his interaction theory of metaphor.

== Works ==
- (1933) The Nature of Mathematics: A Critical Survey (2nd edition, 1950)
- (1937). "Vagueness: An exercise in logical analysis". Philosophy of Science 4: 427–55. Reprinted in Language and Philosophy (1949).
- (1938). "The Evolution of Positivism" Modern Quarterly, Vol. 1. No. 1.
- (1939). "Relations between Logical Positivism and the Cambridge School of Analysis" Erkenntnis, Vol. 8.
- (1946). Critical Thinking, An Introduction to Logic and Scientific Method, Prentice-Hall Inc. Publishers, Prentice-Hall Philosophy Series, New York (revised edition, 1952)
- (1949). Language and philosophy: Studies in method, Ithaca: Cornell University Press. ISBN 978-0801400407
- (1952) "The Identity of Indiscernibles". Mind. 61 (242): 153–164. 1952. ISSN 0026-4423. JSTOR 2252291. Reprinted in Problems of Analysis (1954).
- (1954). "Metaphor", Proceedings of the Aristotelian Society, 55, pp. 273–94. JSTOR 4544549
- (1954). Problems of Analysis: Philosophical Essays, Cornell University Press
- (1959) "Linguistic relativity: The views of Benjamin Lee Whorf", The Philosophical Review. Vol. 68, No. 2, (April 1959). pp. 228–38.
- (1962). Models and metaphors: Studies in language and philosophy, Ithaca: Cornell University Press. ISBN 978-0801400414
- (1964). A Companion to Wittgenstein's Tractatus, Cornell University Press
- (1968). The Labyrinth of Language, Praeger
- (1970). Margins of Precision: Essays in Logic and Language, Cornell University Press
- (1975). Caveats and Critiques: Philosophical Essays in Language, Logic, and Art, Cornell University Press
- (1977). “More about Metaphor.” Dialectica, vol. 31, no. 3/4, 1977, pp. 431–57. JSTOR 42969757 Reprinted in: A. Ortony (ed): Metaphor and Thought. (1979)
- (1985). The Prevalence of Humbug and Other Essays, Cornell University Press
- (1990). Perplexities: Rational Choice, the Prisoner's Dilemma, Metaphor, Poetic Ambiguity, and Other Puzzles, Cornell University Press
