= Diffuse design =

Designing capabilities of non-designers

Diffuse design refers to the designing capability of individuals who are not formally trained as designers. Drawing on the natural human ability to adopt a design approach, nonexpert designers bring diffuse design into the world via a combination of critical sense, creativity, and practical sense.

Diffuse design was coined by Italian design scholar Ezio Manzini and was a central theme of his 2015 book Design, When Everybody Designs. Manzini asserts that everybody is endowed with the ability to design, though not everyone is a competent designer and fewer still become professional designers. He also suggests it is the role of expert designers in social innovation contexts to improve the conditions by which different social actors can take part in co-design processes in a more expert fashion.
