= Printing Historical Society =

The Printing Historical Society (or PHS) is a learned society devoted to the study of the history of printing, in all its forms.

== History ==
The Society was founded in London in 1964 by a group of teachers, scholars, students of design and bibliography, librarians, professional printers and amateur enthusiasts, notably James Mosley, James Moran, John Dreyfus, Michael Turner, Berthold Wolpe, David Chambers and Michael Twyman. At the time, and to some degree ever since, the PHS had close connections with the St Bride Library (then called the St Bride Printing Library) and the Department of Typography & Graphic Communication at the University of Reading. The PHS was the first society to be instituted specifically for the study of printing history, and has been followed by several others, notably the American Printing History Association.

In 2016, the society created a subcommittee of the group to take over the duties of the former National Printing Heritage Trust. This subcommittee is the National Printing Heritage Committee, and it aims to preserve, document, and display printing artifacts. The National Printing Heritage Committee also is in charge of the Virtual Museum of Printing, and has a future goal of creating a physical location for this museum.

The Printing Historical Society is a non-profit organisation and is registered with the UK Charities Commission (Registered No. 295885).

== Aims ==
The aims of the PHS are stated to be "to foster an interest in the history of printing and encourage both the study and the preservation of printing machinery, records, and equipment of historical value". In 2016 it subsumed the National Printing Heritage Trust, and added to its aims to raise funds to preserve printing equipment and archives, and to lobby for the creation of a national printing museum for the U.K.

== Publications ==
Since its inception, the PHS has produced a series of scholarly publications which are available to members, and often also to the general public. An occasional monograph series has included reprints of works and specimens of historical significance, as well as original books on printing type, printing presses, lithographic printers and other aspects of the discipline.

In 1976 to celebrate the quincentenary of the introduction of printing into England the PHS held the Caxton International Congress and published Papers Presented to the Caxton International Congress, 1976.

In 2015 the Society issued An epitome of the history of printing in sixteen leaves as a keepsake for its fiftieth anniversary (which included pages printed by all the main reproductive processes, from woodcut to digital) and a special number of the PHS Journal. The Journal was originally issued annually and latterly published twice a year, has a good reputation for learning, originality, accuracy and detail, and for the reproduction of specimens of historical printing processes and documents. The Society has also published a Bulletin and, after 2000, joined with the Friends of St Bride and the National Printing Heritage Trust in issuing the quarterly Printing History News (edited by Paul W. Nash 2005–2015 and Ken Burnley 2015–2025). The Journal has had a series of distinguished editors and guest-editors, including Mosley, Twyman, Margaret M. Smith, Richard Lawrence, John Trevitt and Paul W. Nash. It has been edited by Martyn Ould since 2025.

== See also ==
- Society for the History of Authorship, Reading and Publishing
