= Kenji Ekuan =

Japanese designer and monk (1929–2015)

- 榮久庵 憲司
- Born: September 11, 1929; Tokyo
- Died: February 8, 2015 (aged 85); Tokyo
- Education: Tokyo University of the Arts
- Occupation: Industrial designer
- Website: www.gk-design.co.jp

Kenji Ekuan (榮久庵 憲司, Ekuan Kenji; September 11, 1929 – February 8, 2015) was a Japanese industrial designer, best known for creating the design of the Kikkoman soy sauce bottle.

== Biography ==
Born in Tokyo on September 11, 1929, Ekuan spent his youth in Hawaii. At the end of World War II, he moved to Hiroshima, where he witnessed the atomic bombing of the city, in which he lost his sister and his father, a Buddhist priest. He said the devastation motivated him to become a "creator of things". Later he attended Tokyo National University of Fine Arts and Music (present-day Tokyo University of the Arts). In 1957, he founded GK Industrial Design Laboratory (ＧＫインダストリアルデザイン研究所). "GK" stood for "Group of Koike", as Koike was the name of an associate professor at the university.

In 1970, he became president of the Japan Industrial Designers' Association and five years later he was elected as president of the International Council of Societies of Industrial Design.

During his lifetime he served as chair of the Japan Institute of Design, dean of Shizuoka University of Art and Culture was and a trustee of the Art Center College of Design.

Ekuan died in the hospital in Tokyo on February 8, 2015, at the age of 85.

== Selected works ==
Products that Ekuan oversaw the design of included the following.

- Kikkoman soy sauce bottle, 1961
- Yamaha VMAX motorcycle, 2008
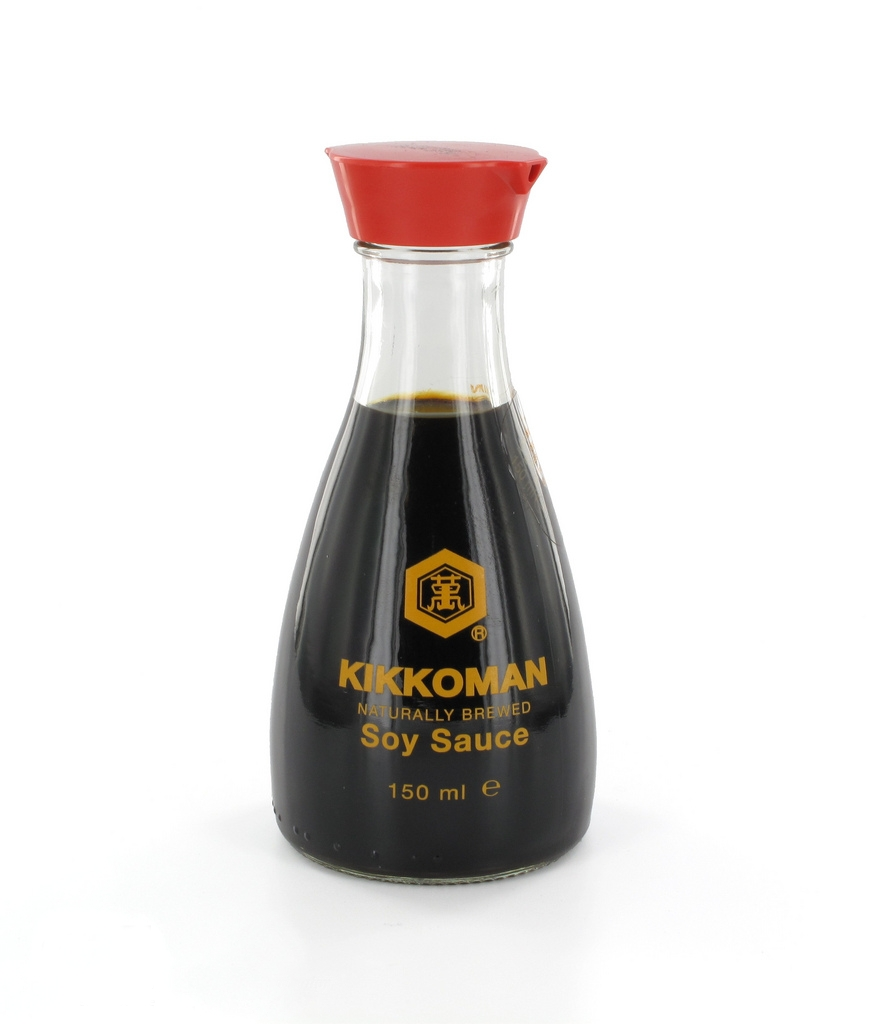
Kikkoman soy sauce bottle

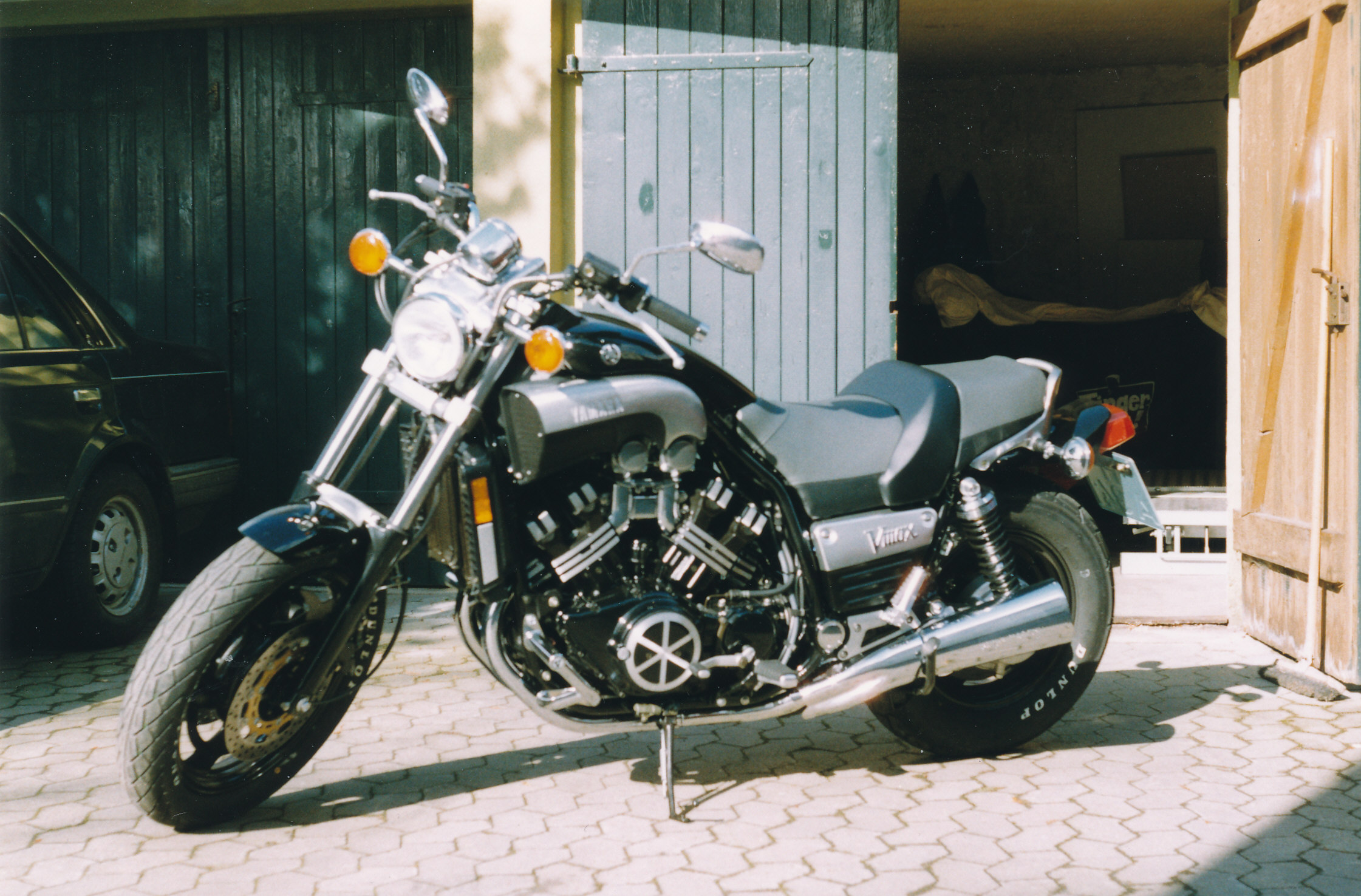
Yamaha VMAX

=== Railway vehicles ===
- 253 series Narita Express train, 1991
- E3 Series Shinkansen Komachi train, 1997
- E259 series Narita Express train, 2009
- E233 series commuter train, 2006
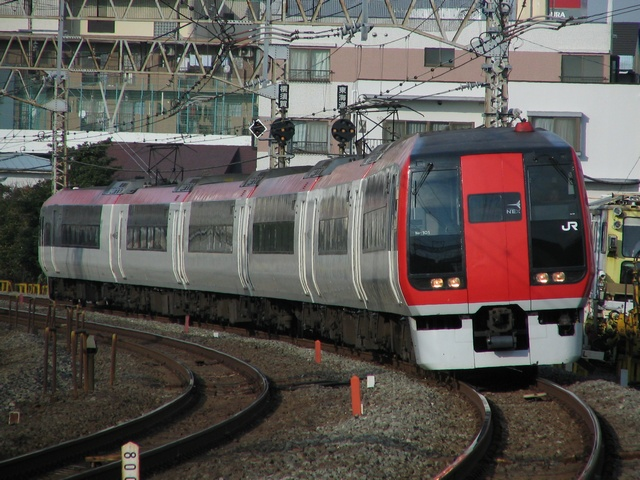
Narita Express 253 series

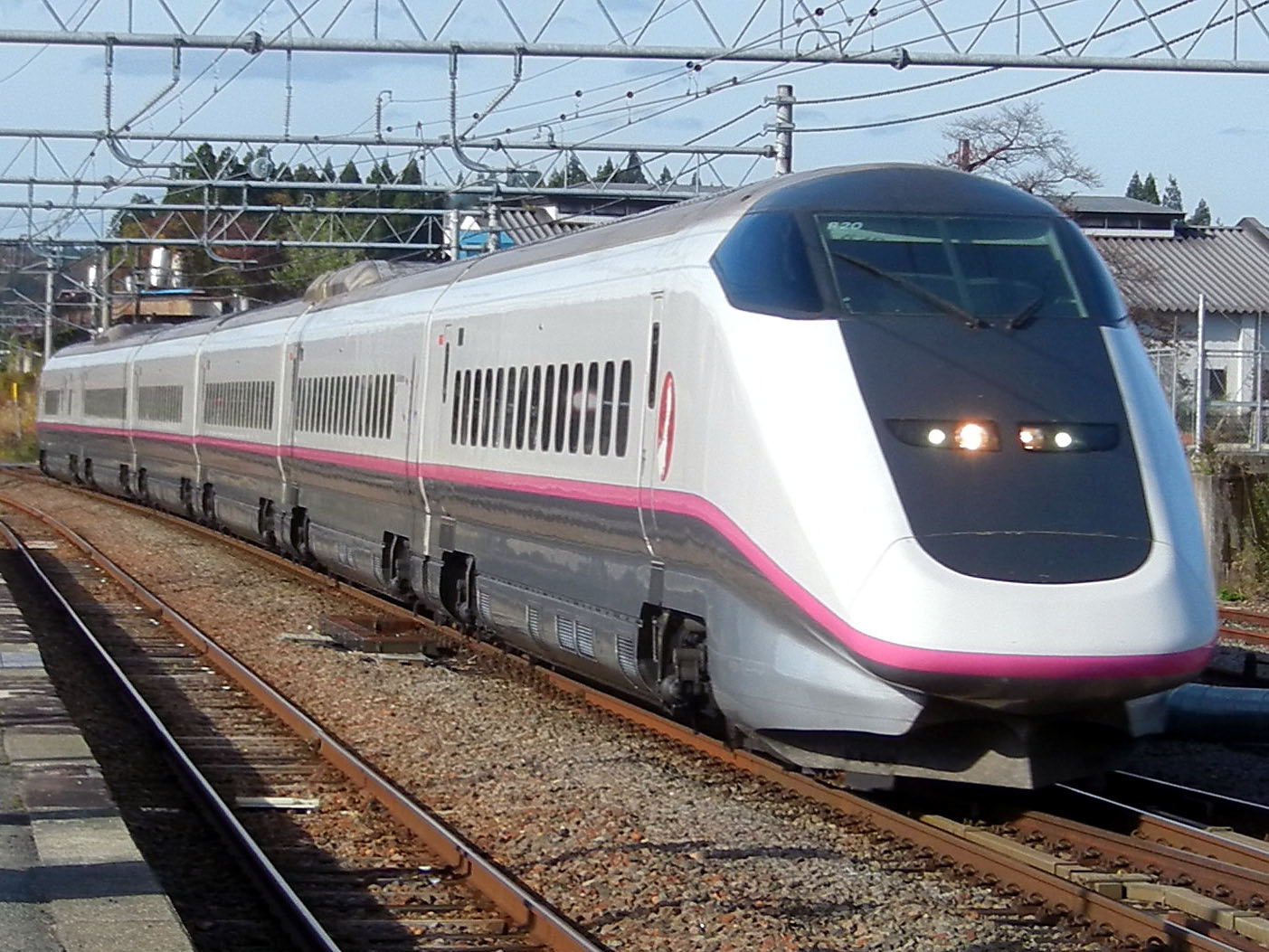
E3 Series Shinkansen

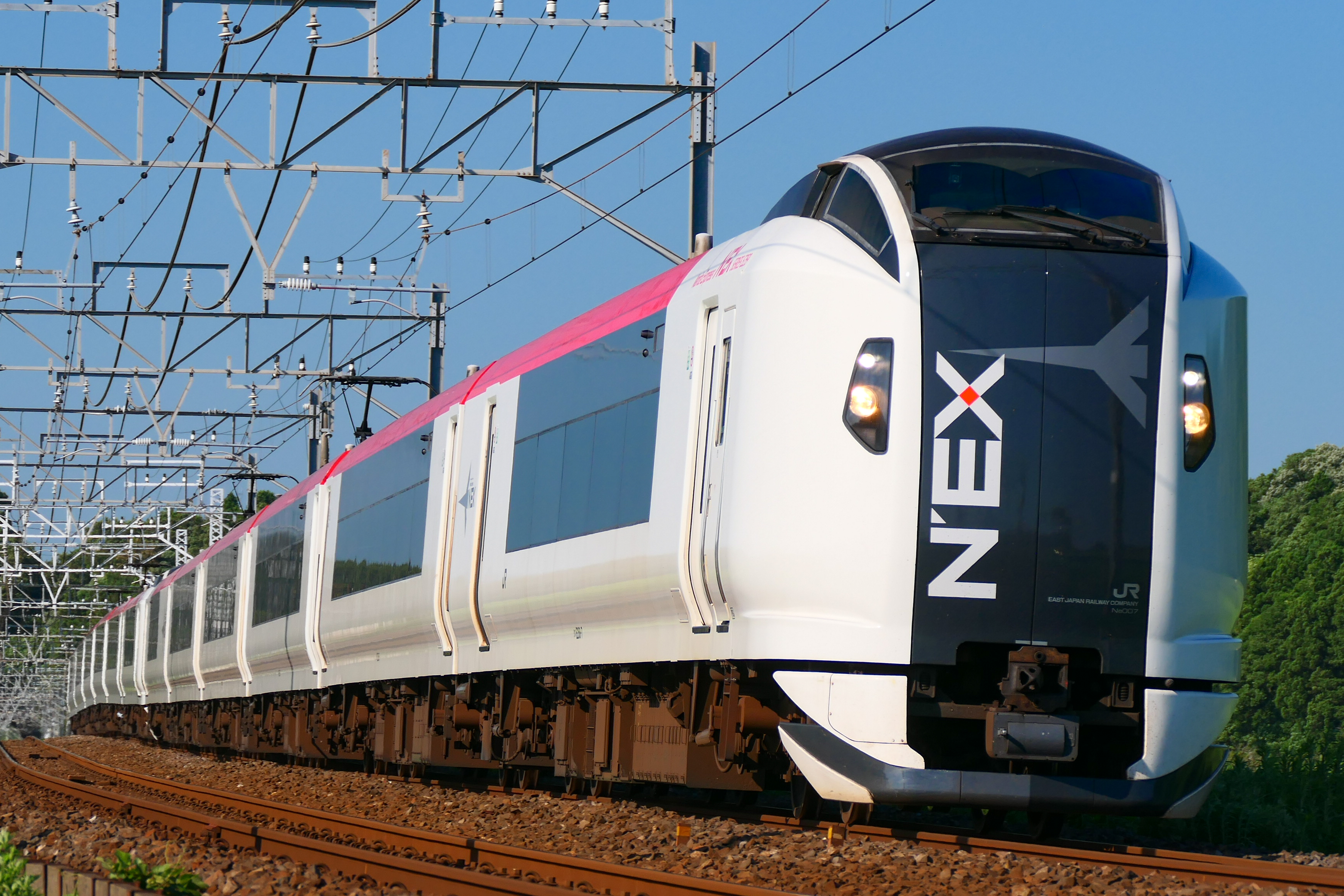
Narita Express E259 series

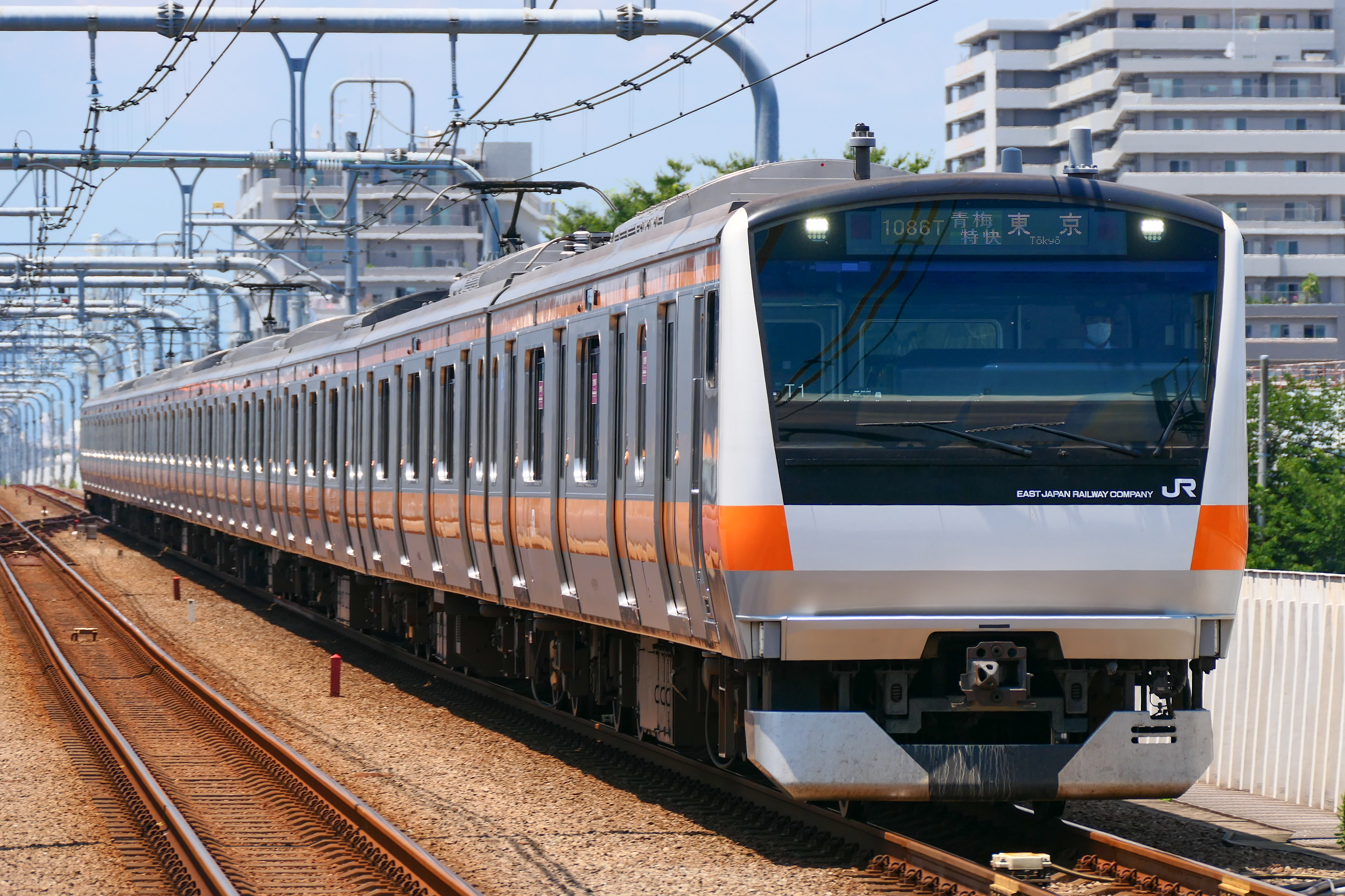
E233 series

=== Logos ===
- Tokyo Metropolitan Government logo, 1989
- Ministop convenience store logo
- Japan Racing Association logo
Tokyo Metropolitan Government logo

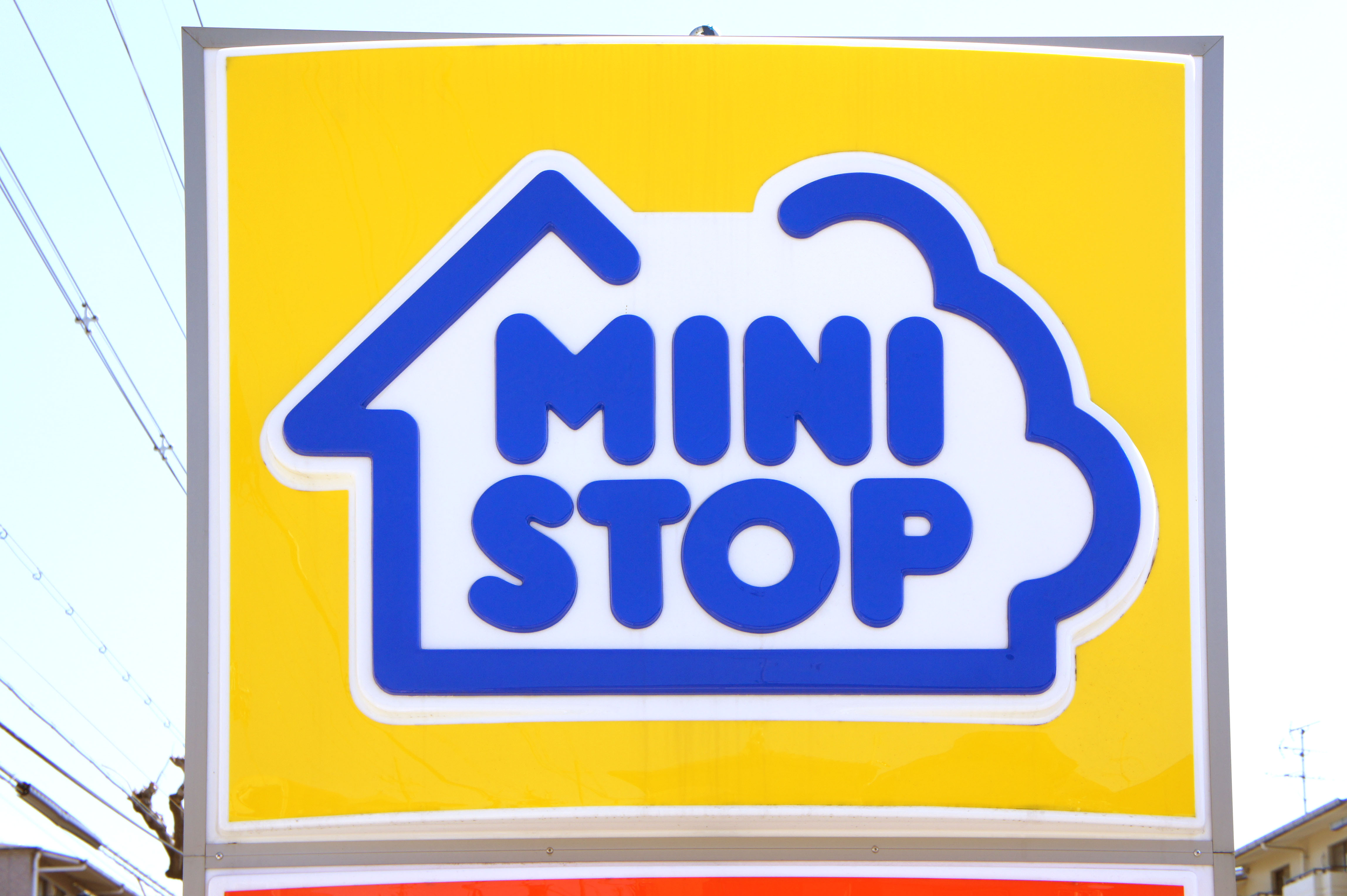
Ministop store logo

Japan Racing Association logo

He also served as co-general producer for the World Design Exposition 1989 held in Nagoya.

== Honors and awards ==
- 1979: Colin King Grand Prix - International Council of Societies of Industrial Design
- 1995: Sir Misha Black Medal
- 1997: Ordre des Arts et des Lettres - French Minister of Culture
- 2000: Order of the Rising Sun, Gold Rays with Rosette
- 2003: Lucky Strike Designer Award - Raymond Loewy Foundation
- 2004: Commander in the Order of the Lion of Finland
- 2014: Compasso d'Oro for Lifetime Achievement - Associazione per il Disegno Industriale

== Published books ==
- Kenji Ekuan (1 March 1998). The Aesthetics of the Japanese Lunchbox. Diane Publishing Company. ISBN 978-0-7567-7620-6.
