= Christopher Frayling =

British educationalist and writer (born 1946)

Professor Emeritus Sir Christopher Frayling
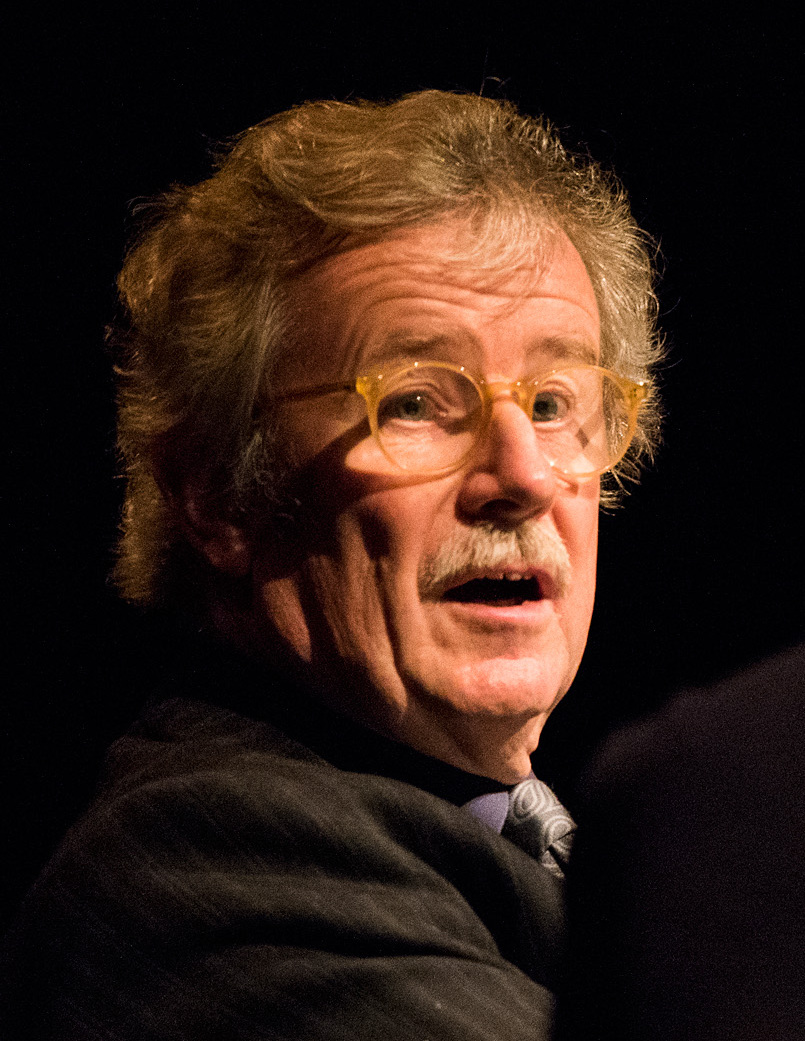
- Frayling at the University of Bath in 2015
- Born: Christopher John Frayling; 25 December 1946 (age 79); Hampton, London, England
- Occupations: Educationalist; writer
- Relatives: Nicholas Frayling (brother)

Academic background
- Education: Churchill College, Cambridge (PhD)

Academic work
- Discipline: Cultural History, Art & Design,
- Institutions: University of Bath; Royal College of Art; Arts University Bournemouth

Sir Christopher John Frayling (born 25 December 1946) is a British educationalist and writer, known for his study of popular culture. He was awarded a knighthood for Services to Art and Design Education in the 2001 New Year Honours.

== Early life and education ==
Christopher Frayling was born in Hampton, a suburb of London, England, in affluent circumstances. His father, Major Arthur Frederick Frayling, OBE (1910–1993), late of the Royal Army Service Corps, was chairman of the Hudson's Bay fur auction house in London and of the International Fur Trade Federation; his mother, Barbara Kathleen ("Betty") Imhof, the daughter of record and audio equipment store owner Alfred Imhof, was a driver in international car rallies, and won the RAC Rally with her brother, Godfrey Imhof, in 1952. His brother, Nicholas, was Dean of Chichester Cathedral from 2002–2014.

After attending Repton School, Christopher Frayling read history at Churchill College, Cambridge and gained a PhD in the study of Jean-Jacques Rousseau. Frayling was appointed a Fellow of the college in 2009.

== Career ==
Frayling taught history at the University of Bath and was awarded an Honorary Degree (Doctor of Arts) from that University in 2003. In 1979, Frayling was appointed Professor of Cultural History at London's post-graduate art and design school, the Royal College of Art. Frayling was Rector of the Royal College of Art from 1996 to 2009.

In 2003, he was awarded the Sir Misha Black Award and was added to the College of Medallists. He was the Chairman of Arts Council England from 2005 until January 2009. He served as Chairman of the Design Council, Chairman of the Royal Mint Advisory Committee, and a Trustee of the Victoria and Albert Museum. He was a governor of the British Film Institute in the 1980s.

In April 2014, he was appointed Chancellor of the Arts University Bournemouth.

He has had a wide output as a writer and critic on subjects ranging from vampires to westerns. He has written and presented television series such as The Art of Persuasion on advertising and Strange Landscape on the Middle Ages. He has conducted a series of radio and television interviews with figures from the world of film, including Woody Allen, Deborah Kerr, Ken Adam, Francis Ford Coppola and Clint Eastwood. Frayling has written and presented several television series, including The Face of Tutankhamun and Nightmare: Birth of Horror.

He studied Spaghetti Westerns and specifically director Sergio Leone. Frayling has written a popular biography of Leone, Something To Do With Death (2000); helped run the Los Angeles-based Gene Autry Museum's exhibit on Leone in 2005; and appeared in numerous documentaries about Leone and his films, particularly the DVD documentaries of Once Upon a Time in the West (1968). He also provided audio commentaries for the special edition DVD releases of A Fistful of Dollars, For a Few Dollars More, Once Upon a Time in the West and The Colossus of Rhodes.

In January 2018, he gave a lecture at the British Library in the Hogwarts Curriculum Lecture series on "Defence against the Dark Arts". This specialised in the treatment of vampires.

Frayling was awarded the 2026 London Design Medal for lifetime achievement.

== Knighthood ==
In 2001, Frayling was awarded a knighthood for "Services to Art and Design Education" and chose as his motto "PERGE SCELUS MIHI DIEM PERFICIAS", which can be translated as "Proceed, varlet, and let the day be rendered perfect for my benefit". The motto is a reference to a line attributed to Clint Eastwood's character Harry Callahan from Dirty Harry (1971): "Go ahead, punk, make my day".

== Arms ==
Coat of arms of Christopher Frayling
Crest (upon a helm with a wreath Or and Sable): A Dodo Sable beaked and legged Or grasping in the dexter foot a Goblet Argent enflamed Or. Escutcheon Or between three Owls volant affronty bendwise sinister two Bendlets sinister Sable thereon square Billets in bend sinister Argent. Motto Perge Scelus Mihi Diem Perficias Badge A Saquaro Cactus couped Sable ribbed Or.

== Select bibliography ==
=== Literature ===
- Napoleon Wrote Fiction (1972)
- The Vampyre (1978); Gollanz
  - Expanded as Vampyres: Lord Byron to Count Dracula (1991); Faber & Faber
  - Expanded as Vampyres: Genesis and Resurrection from Count Dracula to Vampirella (2016); Thames & Hudson
- Nightmare: Birth of Horror (1996)
- On Craftsmanship: towards a new Bauhaus (2011)
- The Yellow Peril – Dr Fu Manchu and the Rise of Chinophobia (2014)
- Inside the Bloody Chamber: on Angela Carter, the Gothic and other weird tales (2015)

=== History ===
- The Face of Tutankhamun (1992)
- Strange Landscape: Journey Through the Middle Ages (1995)

=== Film ===
- Spaghetti Westerns: Cowboys and Europeans from Karl May to Sergio Leone (1981)
- American Westerners (1984)
- Clint Eastwood (1992)
- Things to Come (1995)
- Sergio Leone: Something To Do With Death (2000)
- Mad, Bad and Dangerous?: The Scientist and the Cinema (2005)
- Sergio Leone: Once Upon a Time in Italy (2005)
- Ken Adam: The Art of Production Design (2005)
- Once Upon a Time in The West Shooting a Masterpiece (2019)

=== Education ===
- The Royal College of Art: One Hundred and Fifty Years of Art and Design (1987)
- Design of the Times: One Hundred Years of the Royal College of Art (1996)
- The Art Pack (1998)

== List of audio commentaries ==
- Beauty and the Beast (1946)
- The Big Country (1958) – only on the US Kino Lorber and German Koch Media Blu-rays.
- The Colossus of Rhodes (1961)
- Duck, You Sucker! (1971)
- A Fistful of Dollars (1964)
- For a Few Dollars More (1965)
- Frankenstein (1931)
- Frankenstein Meets the Wolf Man (1943)
- The Ghost of Frankenstein (1942)
- The Good, the Bad and the Ugly (1966)
- The Innocents (1961) – only on the UK BFI and US Criterion Collection DVD and Blu-ray, along with a featurette he presents.
- The Magnificent Seven (1960) – only on the US MGM Collector's Edition DVD, along with a featurette he presents.
- Once Upon a Time in the West (1968), with actress Claudia Cardinale; directors Bernardo Bertolucci, John Carpenter, Alex Cox and John Milius; and fellow film historian Dr. Sheldon Hall.

== Notes ==
Media offices
Preceded by Gerry Robinson	Chair of Arts Council England; 2004–2009	Succeeded by Dame Liz Forgan
