= Sam Black (public relations) =

British public relations manager

Sam Black MBE FBIM FRSA
- Born: Samuel Black; 6 January 1915; Hackney, London, England
- Died: 23 January 1999 (aged 84); Watford, Hertfordshire, England
- Education: Northampton Engineering College
- Occupations: Ophthalmic optician, public relations counsellor, author and editor, administrator, educator
- Spouse(s): Muriel Cecilia Emily Snudden (m. 1939; died 1982) Gwendoline Lucy Bowles (m. 1986–1999)
- Children: 2
- Relatives: Max Black, Misha Black (siblings)

Samuel Black MBE FBIM FRSA (6 January 1915 – 23 January 1999) was a British optician and public relations manager involved in the founding of the Institute for Public Relations in 1948, and the International Public Relations Association (IPRA) in 1955. He wrote 18 books about public relations and organised over 200 international exhibitions showcasing British industry, and was awarded an MBE in the 1969 Birthday Honours for services to export.

== Early life ==
Sam Black was born on 6 January 1915; his father was Lionel Black (formerly Tcherny), and his mother was Sophia (née Divinskaia). His elder brothers were the philosopher Max Black and the architect Misha Black. Black attended Dame Alice Owen's School, Angel, Islington, and then went on to study at Northampton Engineering College, graduating as a Fellow of the Spectacle Makers Company (FSMC), UK in 1934. He was an ophthalmic optician from 1934 until his death. He practised in Northampton from 1934 until he joined the Royal Army Medical Corps (1941–1946). He married Muriel C E Snudden in 1939, and they spent their honeymoon on a tandem, cycling around Brittany, France. They had two children, Patrica in 1944 and Christopher in 1947.

During World War II, Black was recruited by RAMC. After training staff in the UK, he was sent to Cairo, with colleagues, to take charge of supplying spectacles for the troops in the Middle East. After the war, he divided his time between working part-time as an ophthalmic optician in Henley-on-Thames and his diverse work with the Association of Optometrists (AOP), and, from 1948 his involvement with the IPR and IPRA.

=== Optometry ===
Black represented Warwickshire and Northants on the first AOP; he was elected in 1946. He volunteered to serve on the Association's Parliamentary and Health Services, and Publicity and Public Relations committees. Black also helped to publish the first issue of The Optical Practitioner, in May 1947. The publication changed its name to AOP newsletter; Black continued as the editor and publisher of that publication, and Vision magazine, until he left in 1955 to take up his position at British Electrical and Allied Manufacturers (BEAMA).

During his time with the AOP, Black served on the Ministry of Health Spectacle Frames Committee, Visual Welfare Committee, Publications Committee and the Ministry of Health Optical Committee. He also served on the Penman Committee, which was set up to monitor payments to optometrists, and served on the Optical Whitley Council. Black was appointed Vice-Chairman of the Oxfordshire Ophthalmic Services Committee and went on to become Secretary to the Oxford Regional Hospital Board Advisory Committee. Black was appointed the official expert on eye care for BBC Radio 4's Woman's Hour and was director of the AOP Information Bureau, and edited their magazine Vision for the public.

His most notable campaigns were to pay greater attention to children's eyesight, have refresher courses for opticians and link vision with how drivers perform on the road.

=== British Electrical and Allied Manufacturers ===
Black was the head of public relations at the British Electrical and Allied Manufacturers from 1955 to 1960. He organised a large British electrical exhibit at Expo 58 in Brussels.

=== Society of Environmental Engineers ===
Black took on the position of secretary for the Society of Environmental Engineers (SEE) for the interim period after Pat Millard; he also edited the society's journal for many years.

Black edited the journal Educational Media International for many years, and other journals for other bodies, including Town Guides to Henley-upon-Thames. He and his wife Muriel were directors of The Sam Black Organisation Limited, and The Modino Press Limited.

== Exhibitions ==
Black organised 262 overseas exhibitions across the world, mainly for the Board of Trade in conjunction with the London Chamber of Commerce and Industry. The first 100 exhibitions gained him an MBE for services to export in the 1969 Birthday Honours. Black also organised over 100 conferences in the UK and across the world from 1965 to 1972.

== Public relations ==
Black worked hard for the establishment of the Institute of Public Relations (IPR) in 1948. In 1953 he stood in for Norman Rogers to become honorary secretary for the IPR.

Black joined the International Public Relations Association (IPRA) a few years after it formed in 1955 and organised many meetings for the group across the globe. In 1977 he began to edit the IPRA Review until 1985. Black also became the Secretary-General of the Association from 1977 until 1980. He was appointed as President for the IPRA in 1982.

=== Professor of public relations ===
In the US, public relations courses had been available to study since 1923, and hundreds of universities offered courses on the subject by 1948. However, Britain did not offer any. In 1970, the Communication, Advertising and Marketing Education Foundation was formed, and tried to get universities interested in hosting public relations courses.

Black became the first professor of public relations in the United Kingdom in 1988 at the University of Stirling. Professor John Horden had noticed the success of an MPhil degree in publishing studies, and believed that a public relations master's degree could have the same success. Black sent a copy of the IPRA Gold Paper No. 4 and proposed a course to the university. After negotiating for five years, the MSc in Public Relations began in autumn 1988. Across Britain, similar courses at undergraduate level commenced in September 1989. The University offered a distance learning version of the masters in January 1991.

Black was appointed an Honorary Professor of Public Relations at Stirling in honour of his role at drawing up the syllabus for the Master's course there.

== Chess ==
Black was London Boys' Chess Champion; he managed to defeat the then British champion, William Winter, in 1935 and 1936. During his time at the University of London, he captained the Chess Club from 1933–4. He was secretary of Finchley Chess Club and the president of the London North Circular Chess League until 1997.

== Later life and death ==
Muriel died in 1982, and Sam married Gwen Bowles in 1986. Black died of cancer at Bushey Hospital on 23 January 1999. He was survived by his second wife Gwen, his two children Patricia and Christopher, and his five grandchildren.

== Publications ==
- Practical Public Relations (1962)
- Exhibiting Overseas – a marketing shop window (1971)
- The Role of Public Relations in Management (1972)
- The Institute of Public Relations 1948–73 – the First Twenty Five Years (1973)
- Public Relations in the 1980s (1979)
- Practical Public Relations: Common-sense Guidelines for Business and Professional People (1984)
- The Practice of Public Relations (1988) (1995)
- Introduction to Public Relations (1989)
- Exhibitions and Conferences A-Z (1989)
- The Place of Public Relations in Management Education (1991)
- The Essentials of Public Relations (1993)
- Public Relations – Revision Workbook (1993)
- International Public Relations Case Studies (1993)
- A Commitment to Excellence – International Public Relations Association: The First Forty Years (1995)

Unknown publication date

- Guide to Industrial Film Making
- The Businessman's Guide to the Planned Economy Countries

== Previous appointments and awards ==
- Past president and founder member, International Public Relations Association;
- Past chairman and founder member, Institute of Public Relations;
- Secretary-general, International Public Relations Association, 1977–80;
- Chairman, IPRA International Commission on Public Relations Education, 1990;
- Chairman of the Judges, IPRA Golden World Awards for Excellence, 1990, 1991;
- Diploma of Excellence, European Public Relations Confederation, 1970;
- Recipient of the President's medal of the Institute of Public Relations, 1972;
- President's citation of the Public Relations Society of America, 1978;
- Voted one of the leading 40 public relations practitioners in the world by readers of PR News, of New York, 1984;
- Award for Outstanding Service to Public Relations Education by University of Florida at Gainesville, USA, 1984
- President's medal of the International Public Relations Association, 1985;
- Gold Medal of the Arab Public Relations Society, 1990;
- Gold Medal of the Nigerian Institute of Public Relations, 1990;
- Grand Prix of CERP (the European Public Relations Confederation), 1992;
- Lifetime Achievement Award from CIPR, 1998.
- Honorary Membership of Association of Optometrists 7 May 1998

=== Academic honours ===
- Honorary Professor of the University of Stirling, Stirling, Scotland;
- Honorary Professor of Escuela Superior Empresarial Relaciones Publicas (ESERP), Barcelona, Spain;
- Visiting Professor of the College of St Mark and St John, Plymouth (University of Exeter), Exeter, England;
- Honorary Distinguished Lecturer, University of South Alabama, USA;
- Honorary Professor, Xian University of Electronic Science and Technology, China;
- Honorary Professor, Xian University Machinery Electric College, China.

=== Other notable awards ===
- Awarded Member of the Order of British Empire in 1969 for ''Services to Export''
- Fellow of the British Institute of Management
- Fellow of the Royal Society of Arts, 1957
- Fellow of the Institute of Public Relations
- Member of the Institute of Marketing
- Member of the Institute of Journalists
- Freeman of the City of London
- Secretary of the British Management Training Export Council
