= Gonzalo Tassier =

Mexican graphic designer

Gonzalo Tassier was a Mexican graphic designer and publicity professional from Mexico City, who created a number of logos and trademarks in Mexico.

== Early life and education ==
He was born in Mexico City in 1941. In his youth, he studied at the UNAM School of Architecture. After architecture school, Tassier studied philosophy for four years, before joining a religious community called the Missionaries of the Holy Spirit. Tassier was a self-taught designer.

Tassier worked for offices, such as Giancarlo Novi, Design Center and Bozell. Tassier’s best-known work includes the logo for Pemex (created with Francisco Teuscher), the trademarks for Del Fuerte and Aguigol, and the eagle which has been used for the Mexico national football team since 1998. He designed brochures for Ford and Wyeth, audiovisual work for IMSS, and book covers for the Demac publishing company.

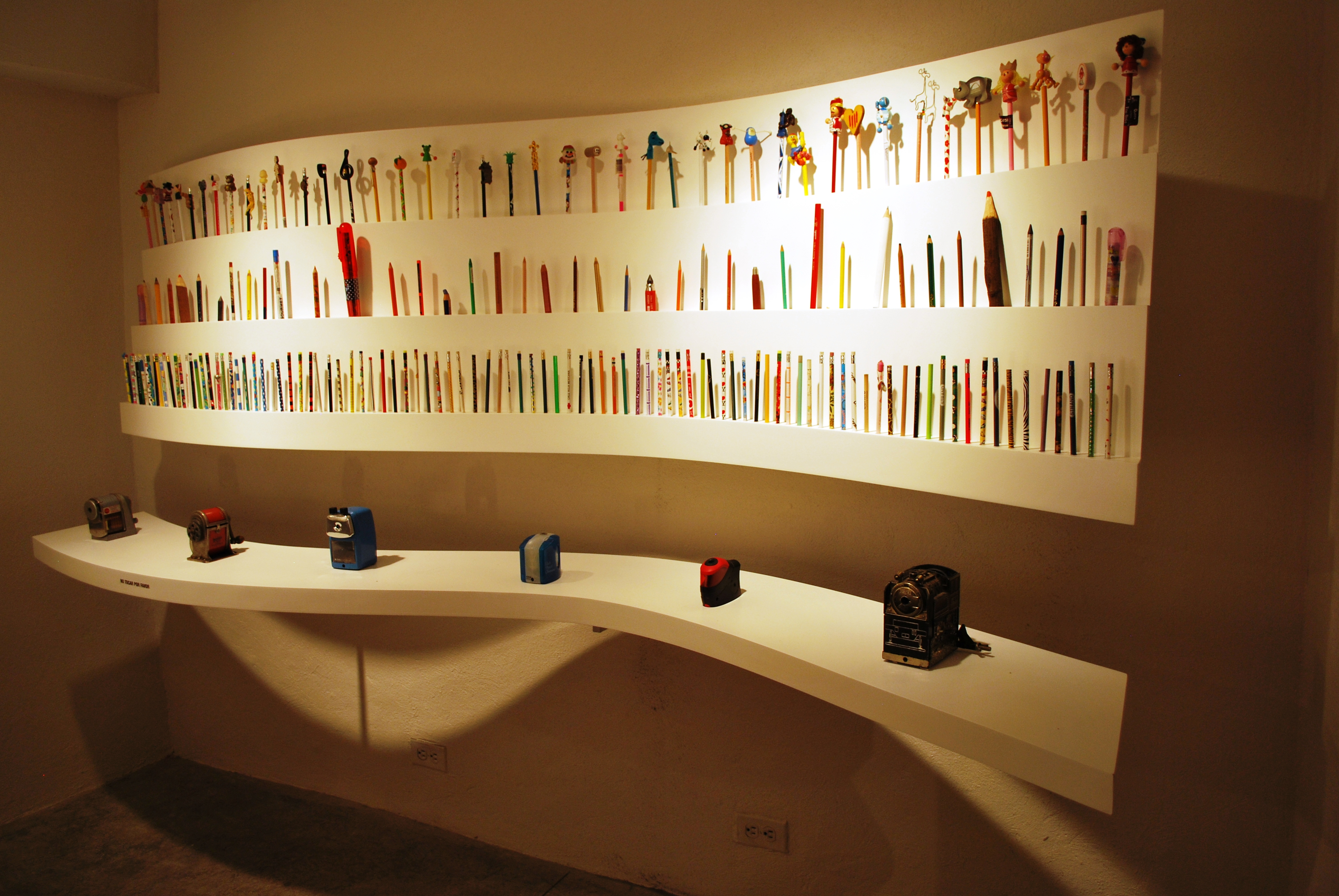
Part of Tassier's pencil collection at the Museo del Objeto del Objeto in Mexico City

In 1995, Tassier founded his own agency called Retorno Tassier, dedicated to graphic design, publishing, and general publicity, located in Mexico City. The agency works with Mexican and international companies along with governmental agencies, a number of non-profit organizations as a social service, and other organizations. Clients include Santander Group, Volkswagen of Mexico, and the United Nations Industrial Development Organization.

Tassier remained with his agency as president. Another independent firm Tassier created with partner Bruno Newman is La Gunilla Editores, a publishing house whose books focus on design and collecting. The name is a play on "Lagunilla", a community which has a well known local market for collectors.

In 2002, he received honors from the Quórum organization, which also published a book about his career.

Tassier was also a professor of design at the Universidad Iberoamericana. In 2008, he was awarded the Sir Misha Black Medal for his teaching work in London, after being nominated by a group of his students. He is the first Latino to receive the award in thirty years.

His style is considered to be methodical and perfectionist. Tassier believes that laughter is fundamental to a good commercial.

The Museo del Objeto held an exhibition of Tassier’s work in October 2011 as part of the “El MODO de ….” ("The Manner of ....") series. In addition to drawings and design, the exhibit also included Tassier’s pencil collection, which has over 11,000 pieces. After his passing, the museum held another exhibition in tribute to Tassier.
