= Elaine Ostroff =

American design educator

Elaine Ostroff (born February 27, 1933) is an American designer and educator based in Massachusetts. She contributed to the Universal Design movement and promoted inclusive design education in the United States.

== Early life and education ==
Ostroff was born in Fall River, Massachusetts on February 27, 1933. She graduated from Durfee High School in 1951. She attended Brandeis University, receiving a Bachelors of Science in 1955. Later, she received a Radcliffe Fellowship in 1970, and received a Ed.M. degree from Harvard University.

== Career ==
Ostroff served as Director of training for the Massachusetts Department of Mental Health where she developed programs and courses supporting community-based living for disabled people. She was the U.S. representative to a United Nations meeting on the Rights of Children in 1977.

In 1978 Ostroff co-founded, with Cora Beth Abel, of the Adaptive Environments Center, which specialized in creating access for people with disabilities. The Center grew out of the Arts and Human Services Project, a multi-disciplinary graduate program at the Massachusetts College of Art that emphasized the role of artists and designers in creating inclusive spaces. Adaptive Environments was later re-named the Institute for Human Centered Design, which still operates in Boston.

At Adaptive Environments, Ostroff became a part of a network of designers who contributed to the concept of Universal Design, or design that includes both disabled and non-disabled people without separation. She began a national seminar on "Design for All People" in 1982, which developed into the Universal Design Education Project (UDEP) in 1989. She emphasized more creative approaches to accessibility than the basics of legal code requirements, and foregrounded the role of disabled people themselves in design. She coined the term "user/expert" for people whose personal experiences qualified them to evaluate access in the built environment.

Ostroff was present at the signing of the Americans with Disabilities Act at the White House on July 26, 1990.

She also contributed to the Principles of Universal Design, along with collaborators Ronald L. Mace, Edward Steinfeld, Mike Jones, and Jim Mueller. She promoted Universal Design as a method to teach in design schools, establishing the Universal Design Educators Network in 1998.

In 2015 Ostroff donated her papers to the Smithsonian Institution in order to allow others to benefit from her experience working on universal design.

== Selected publications ==
- Preiser, Wolfgang F. E., and Elaine Ostroff. Universal Design Handbook. McGraw-Hill Handbooks. New York: McGraw-Hill, 2001.
- Ostroff, Elaine. Building a World Fit for People: Designers with Disabilities at Work. Boston, MA: Adaptive Environments Center, 2002.
- Ostroff, Elaine. Humanizing Environments: A Primer: The Most Facilitating Environments for Children, Their Teachers and Families. Cambridge, Mass: Produced by Word Guild for the Massachusetts Dept. of Mental Health, 1978.

== Honors and awards ==
In 2018 Ostroff received an honorary degree from Middlebury College. She was the 2004 recipient of the Sir Misha Black Award that is bestowed by the Royal College of Art. In 2006, the American Institute of Architects named her as an honorary member in recognition of her work.
