= Ezio Manzini =

Italian design academic and author

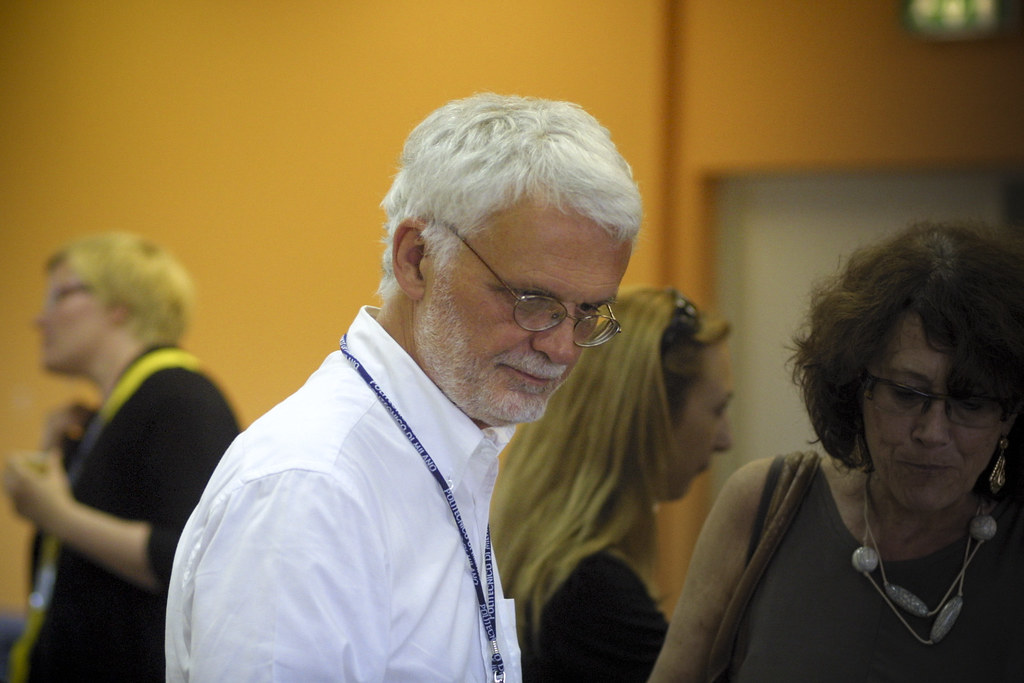

Ezio Manzini (born 1945) is an Italian design academic and author known for his work on design for social innovation and sustainability. He is Honorary Professor at Politecnico di Milano, Chair Professor at University of the Arts London, and presently Distinguished Professor on Design for Social Innovation at ELISAVA, and guest professor at Tongji University and Jiangnan University. Manzini is the founder of DESIS, an international network on design for social innovation and sustainability.

== Career ==
Ezio Manzini studied at the Politecnico di Milano, where he later joined the faculty. During his time at the school, Manzini worked on several international research projects, including co-ordinating the Unit of Research DIS (Design and Innovation for Sustainability), the Doctorate in Design, and DES (Design dei Servizi) in the Centre for Service Design.

Manzini is an author on sustainable design. Throughout the 1980s and 1990s, his research focused on the design of materials and strategic design. He wrote on topics such as scenario building toward solutions that encompass environmental and social quality; innovative processes in the system of production and consumption; and the relationship between product strategies and environmental policies from the perspective of sustainable development. Though he is perhaps most well known for his work on design for social innovation. In the 2015 book, Design, When Everybody Designs, Manzini provides an overview of the way design has been deployed in the social innovation space to guide the transition to more sustainable practices. The book explores the role of diffuse and expert design, it describes the concept of cosmopolitan localism, and Manzini's Small, Open, Local, and Connected (SLOC) scenario.

In 2009, Manzini founded DESIS, an international network of design schools and related organisations working on initiatives and projects in the design for social innovation and sustainability fields.

In addition to his time at Politecnico, Manzini was the Director of Design and Vice-president of the Domus Academy in the 1990s, and Chair Professor of Design under the Distinguished Scholars Scheme at Hong Kong Polytechnic University in 2000.

He has received honorary titles at several universities including Honorary Doctoral of Arts at Aalto University, Honorary Doctor of Fine Arts at The New School and Goldsmiths, University of London; Honorary Professor at the Glasgow School of Art; and Fellow at the Australian Centre for Science, Innovation and Society at the University of Melbourne.

== Awards ==
- Compasso d’Oro, 1987, 2016
- Premio per l’innovazione (Ministero dell'Innovazione Italiano), 2010
- Sir Misha Black Award, 2012

== Books ==
- The Material of Invention, The MIT Press, 1986
- Artifacts: Towards a New Ecology of the Artificial Environment, Domus Academy, 1990
- Solid Side: The Search for Consistency in a Changing World (with Marco Susani), V+K Publishing, 1995
- Sustainable Everyday: Scenarios of Urban Life (with François Jégou), Edizioni Ambiente, 2003
- Spark! Design and Locality (with Jan Verwijnen, Hanna Karkku, and John Thackara), University of Art and Design Helsinki, 2004
- Collaborative Services: Social Innovation and Design for Sustainability (with François Jégou), POLI.design, 2008
- Design for Environmental Sustainability (with Carlo Vezzoli), Springer, 2008
- Design, When Everybody Designs: An Introduction to Design for Social Innovation, The MIT Press, 2015
- Politics of the Everyday, Bloomsbury, 2019
