= Misha Black =

British architect and designer (1910–1977)

Misha Black OBE
- Black in 1968
- Born: Moisey Tcherny; October 16, 1910; Baku, Russian Empire
- Died: October 11, 1977 (aged 66); London, England
- Occupations: Industrial designer, architect
- Relatives: Max Black, Sam Black

Misha Black OBE (16 October 1910 – 11 October 1977) was a Russian-born British architect and designer. In 1933 he founded with associates in London the organisation that became the Artists' International Association. In 1943, with Milner Gray and Herbert Read, Black founded Design Research Unit, a London-based design agency that worked in architectural, graphic and interior design.

== Biography ==
Black was born Moisey Tcherny on October 16, 1910 in Baku, Russian Empire into a wealthy Jewish family. His family emigrated to United Kingdom in pursuit of religious freedoms and educational opportunities when he was 18 months old. His elder brother was the philosopher Max Black. He attended Dame Alice Owen's School in Islington and the Central School of Arts and Crafts.

From 1959 to 1975 Black was a professor of industrial design at the Royal College of Art in London, England. During his tenure at the Royal College of Art, he became President of the International Council of Societies of Industrial Design (Icsid) from 1959 to 1961. He was also a Fellow of the Chartered Society of Designers, and winner of the Minerva Medal, the Society's highest award. He was knighted in 1972. Between 1974 and 1976 Black was President of the Design and Industries Association.

== Notable works ==
Misha Black designs

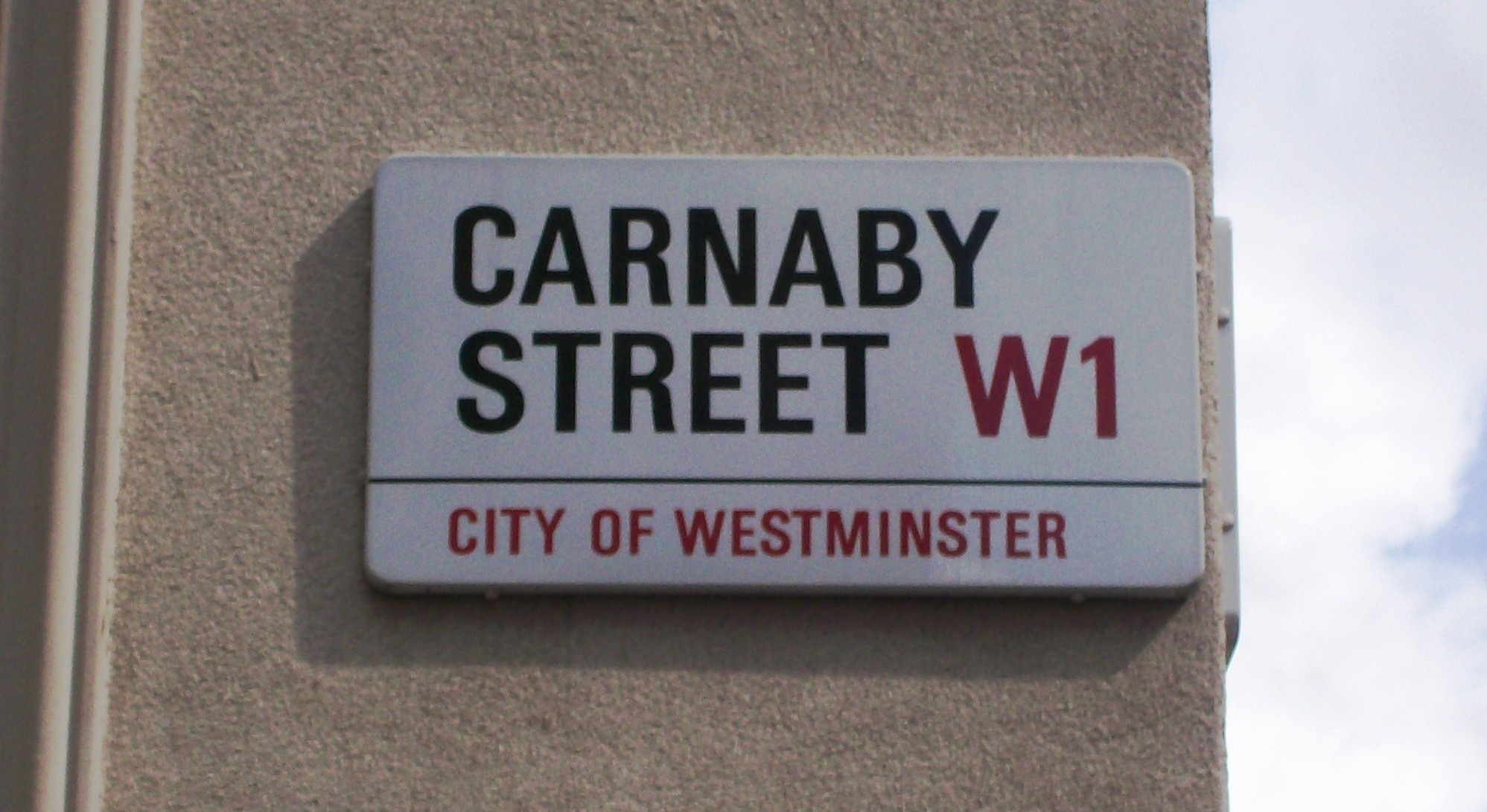
Carnaby Street sign

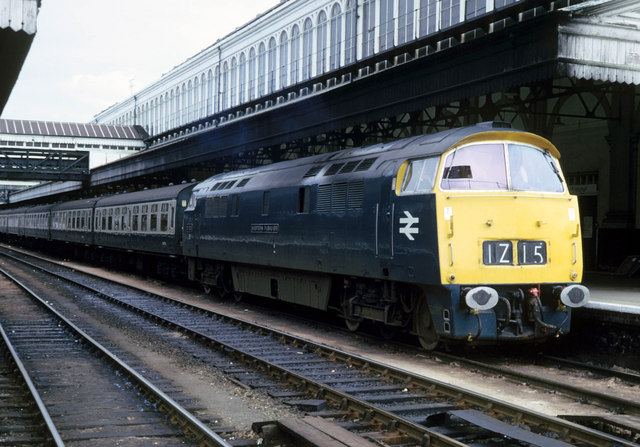
British Rail Class 52

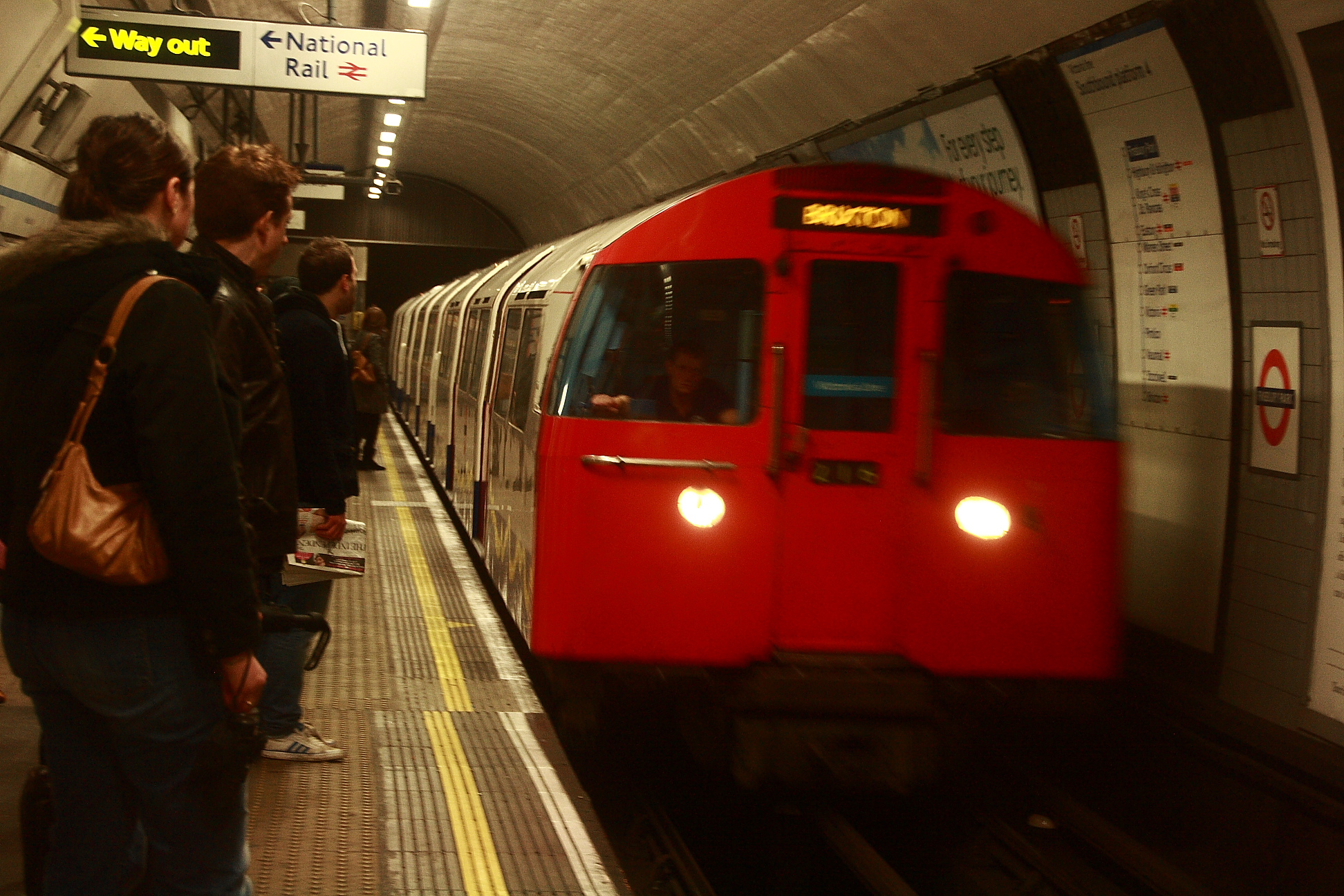
London Underground 1967 Stock

Some examples of Black’s designs include the Westminster street name signs, the external styling of British Railways Southern Region British Rail Class 71 electric locomotives of 1958 and Western Region British Rail Class 52 diesel locomotives of 1961. He also designed the London Underground 1967 Stock that was used on the Victoria line between 1967 and 2011. On 27 July 2003 at Salisbury station, preserved Class 52 D1015 named Western Champion was unveiled carrying temporary Sir Misha Black nameplates.

Black was the designer of "The Birth of an Egg Cup" display at the 1946 Britain Can Make It exhibition at the Victoria and Albert Museum in London.

Black is often credited for designing the black/brown/orange/yellow moquette originally used by London Transport and also the West Yorkshire Passenger Transport Executive in the late 1970s onwards; whilst he commissioned the fabric it was actually the work of the textile designer Jacqueline Groag.

== Publications ==
- Black, Sir Misha (1983). Blake, Avril (ed.). The Black Papers on Design: Selected Writings of the Late Sir Misha Black. Pergamon Press. ISBN 0080267718.

== Family ==
His elder brother was the philosopher Max Black, and his younger brother was the public relations manager Sam Black.

== Legacy ==
Black is commemorated in The Sir Misha Black Awards, created in 1977 by the Design and Industries Association, the Faculty of Royal Designers for Industry (RDI), and the Royal Academy of Engineering. He was influential in framing the educational discipline of Industrial Design (Engineering) in the UK at the Royal College of Art (RCA) and also the foundation of the academic discipline of design research by facilitating the Professorial role offered to Bruce Archer in the first Department of Design Research at the RCA.

Recipients of the Sir Misha Black Medal include prestigious design educators such as Max Bill (1982), Ettore Sottsass (1999), Santiago Calatrava (2002), Margaret Calvert (2016) and Professor Birgit Mager (2020). The Sir Misha Black Award for Innovation in Design Education, first awarded in 1999, was given to Arts University Bournemouth in 2016 and the University of Brighton Design Archives in 2018.

Archive of Black's work is held in the permanent collection of the Victoria and Albert Museum.

== See also ==
- College of Medallists
