= World Design Organization =

International association

- Founded: June 29, 1957
- Type: Non-profit
- Location(s): Montreal, Quebec, Canada (since 2005); Helsinki, Finland (1985-2005); Brussels, Belgium (1974-1985); Paris, France (1957-1974)
- Website: www.wdo.org

The World Design Organization (WDO) was founded in 1957 from a group of international organizations focused on industrial design. Formerly known as the International Council of Societies of Industrial Design, the WDO is a worldwide society that promotes better design around the world. Today, the WDO includes over 170 member organizations in more than 40 nations.

The primary aim of the association is to advance the discipline of industrial design at an international level.

== History ==
Jacques Viénot first presented the idea to form a society to represent the industrial designers internationally at the Institut d’Esthetique Industrielle's international congress in 1953. The International Council of Societies of Industrial Designers was formally founded at a meeting in London on June 29, 1957. The name of Icsid demonstrates the spirit which is to protect the interests of practicing designers and to ensure global standards of design. The individuals first elected officials to the Executive Board therefore did not act upon personal conviction, but represented the voice of society members and the international design community.

The organization then officially registered in Paris and set up their headquarters there. Icsid's early goals were to help public awareness of industrial designers, to raise the standard of design by setting standards for training and education, and to encourage cooperation between industrial designers worldwide. To do this, in 1959 Icsid held the first Congress and General Assembly in Stockholm, Sweden. At this first Congress the Icsid Constitution was officially adopted, along with the first definition of industrial design which may be found on their website (please see external references). During this Congress, Icsid's official name was changed from the International Council of Societies of Industrial Designers to the International Council of Societies of Industrial Design to reflect that the organization would involve itself beyond matters of professional practice.

Throughout Icsid had continued to grow and now has members from all over the world in both capitalist and non-capitalist countries. Icsid has now hosted the Congress in places such as Venice, Paris, Vienna, Montreal, Slovenia, Glasgow, Taipei, Toronto, Sydney, Kyoto and London.

In 1963, Icsid was granted special status with UNESCO, with whom Icsid continues to work on many projects, using design for the betterment of the human condition. As their humanitarian interests grew, Icsid decided to create a new type of conference that would join industrial designers in a host country to study a problem of both regional and international significance. This new conference held in Minsk in 1971, became the first Icsid Interdesign seminar. These seminars provided opportunities for professional development of mid-career practicing designers, and to allow them to focus their abilities on resolving issues of international significance. This first Interdesign conference and the ones that followed, consolidated Icsid's position as a driving force of international collaboration.

In 1974, the Icsid Secretariat moved from Paris, France, to Brussels, Belgium, moving onto Helsinki, Finland, and in 2005, it settled to Montreal, Quebec, Canada, where it currently resides.

In 2003, Icsid and Icograda ratified an agreement between both organizations during their respective General Assemblies to form the International Design Alliance, a multidisciplinary partnership that supports design. In 2008, the IDA partners welcomed a third member, IFI (International Federation of Interior Architects/Designers). Together in 2011, all three partners held a historic joint Congress in Taipei, Taiwan called the IDA Congress. The alliance was terminated in November 2013.

In 2017, in January the Icsid officially became the World Design Organization (WDO).

== See also ==
- World Crafts Council – International non-governmental organization
- Docomomo International – Organization to protect and preserve modern buildings
