= 1986 in literature =

This article contains information about the literary events and publications of 1986.

== Events ==
- April 29 – A major fire at Los Angeles Public Library caused by arson destroys 400,000 volumes.
- July 21 – Michael Grade, Controller of BBC1, axes plans to televise Ian Curteis's The Falklands Play.
- September 29 – Bloomsbury Publishing is set up in London by Nigel Newton.
- October 9 – The Phantom of the Opera, having been the longest running Broadway show ever, opens at Her Majesty's Theatre in London.
- December 19 – The Soviet dissident author Andrei Sakharov is allowed to return to Moscow after six years' internal exile.

== New books ==
=== Fiction ===
- Kingsley Amis – The Old Devils
- V. C. Andrews – Garden of Shadows
- Piers Anthony – Ghost
- Jeffrey Archer – A Matter of Honour
- James Axler – Pilgrimage to Hell and Red Holocaust
- Iain Banks – The Bridge
- Thomas Bernhard – Extinction
- Orson Scott Card – Speaker for the Dead
- Tom Clancy – Red Storm Rising
- Arthur C. Clarke – The Songs of Distant Earth
- James Clavell – Whirlwind
- Jackie Collins – Hollywood Husbands
- Pat Conroy – The Prince of Tides
- Bernard Cornwell – Sharpe's Regiment
- Marguerite Duras – Blue Eyes, Black Hair
- James Ellroy – Silent Terror
- Peter Fox – Downtime
- John Gardner – Nobody Lives For Ever
- Peter Handke – Repetition
- Ernest Hemingway - The Garden of Eden
- Carl Hiaasen – Tourist Season
- Kazuo Ishiguro – An Artist of the Floating World
- Brian Jacques – Redwall
- Stephen King – It
- Judith Krantz – I'll Take Manhattan
- Ágota Kristóf – The Notebook
- Louis L'Amour – Last of the Breed
- Joe R. Lansdale – Dead in the West
- John le Carré – A Perfect Spy
- David Leavitt – The Lost Language of Cranes
- Tanith Lee – Dreams of Dark and Light: The Great Short Fiction of Tanith Lee
- Gordon Lish – Dear Mr. Capote
- H. P. Lovecraft – Dagon and Other Macabre Tales (corrected edition)
- Robert Ludlum – The Bourne Supremacy
- Amin Maalouf – Leo Africanus
- Allan Massie – Augustus (first in the Roman series)
- Frank Miller – Batman: The Dark Knight Returns (graphic novel)
- Robert Munsch – Love You Forever
- Patrick O'Brian – The Reverse of the Medal
- Ellis Peters
  - The Raven in the Foregate
  - The Rose Rent
- Terry Pratchett – The Light Fantastic
- Reynolds Price – Kate Vaiden
- Jean Raspail – Who Will Remember the People...
- Idries Shah – Kara Kush
- Danielle Steel – Wanderlust
- Peter Taylor – A Summons to Memphis
- James Tiptree, Jr. – Tales of the Quintana Roo
- Vladimir Voinovich – Moscow 2042
- Roger Zelazny – Blood of Amber

=== Children and young people ===
- Janet and Allan Ahlberg – The Jolly Postman
- Chris Van Allsburg – The Stranger
- Tony Bradman – Dilly the Dinosaur (first in the eponymous series of 22 books)
- Steven Brust (with Alan Lee) – Brokedown Palace
- Robert J. Burch – Queenie Peavy
- Joy Cowley
  - (with Jan van der Voo) – Turnips For Dinner
  - (with Martin Bailey) – The King's Pudding
- Crescent Dragonwagon – Half a Moon and One Whole Star
- Jill Eggleton (with Kelvin Hawley) – Cat and Mouse
- Berniece T. Hiser – The Adventure of Charlie and His Wheat-Straw Hat
- Diana Wynne Jones – Howl's Moving Castle
- Michael de Larrabeiti
  - The Borribles: Across the Dark Metropolis
  - The Provençal Tales
- Arnold Lobel – The Random House Book of Mother Goose (in verse)
- Patricia McKissack – Flossie & the Fox
- Robert Munsch – Love You Forever
- Jill Murphy – Five Minutes' Peace (first in The Large Family series)
- Jenny Nimmo – The Snow Spider (first in The Magician Trilogy)
- Bill Peet – Zella, Zack, and Zodiac
- Claude Ponti – Adele's Album
- Alison Prince – The Type One Super Robot
- Gillian Rubinstein – Space Demons

=== Drama ===
- Caryl Churchill and David Lan – A Mouthful of Birds
- Nick Darke – The Dead Monkey
- Tomson Highway – The Rez Sisters
- Chinu Modi – Ashwamedh
- Willy Russell – Shirley Valentine
- Arvo Salo – Vallan miehet
- Tom Stoppard – Dalliance (based on a work by Arthur Schnitzler)

=== Poetry ===
- Kama Sywor Kamanda – Chants de brumes (Songs of twilight)

=== Non-fiction ===
- Dave Stieb (with Kevin Boland) - Tomorrow I'll be Perfect
- Martin Amis – The Moronic Inferno: And Other Visits to America
- Bernard Bailyn – Voyagers to the West: A Passage in the Peopling of America on the Eve of the Revolution
- Frank Barlow – Thomas Becket
- Marjorie Chibnall – Anglo-Norman England 1066–1166
- Richard Dawkins – The Blind Watchmaker
- Karlheinz Deschner – Kriminalgeschichte des Christentums (Criminal History of Christianity)
- Adrian Edmondson et al. – How to be a Complete Bastard
- Sita Ram Goel – History of Hindu–Christian Encounters, AD 304 to 1996
- Temple Grandin (with Margaret Scariano) – Emergence: Labeled Autistic
- Patience Gray – Honey from a Weed (cookery)
- Robert Irwin – The Middle East in the Middle Ages: The Early Mamlúk Sultanate 1250–1382
- Kumari Jayawardena – Feminism and Nationalism in the Third World
- Mark Mathabane – Kaffir Boy
- Farley Mowat – My Discovery of America
- Harvey Pekar – American Splendor: The Life and Times of Harvey Pekar (graphic autobiography)
- Marc Reisner – Cadillac Desert
- Richard Rhodes – The Making of the Atomic Bomb
- Jonathan Riley-Smith – The First Crusade and the Idea of Crusading
- Roger Scruton – Sexual Desire: A Philosophical Investigation
- Art Spiegelman – Maus: A Survivor's Tale (I: My Father Bleeds History) (graphic biography/autobiography)
- Jean Vercoutter – The Search for Ancient Egypt
- Mary Wilson – Dreamgirl: My Life As a Supreme

== Births ==
- January 24 - Aimee Carter, American young-adult fiction writer
- June 6 - Rachelle Dekker, American science-fiction writer
- July 3 – Chris Bush, English playwright, artistic director and comedian
- unknown dates
  - Caroline Bird, English poet and dramatist
  - Chigozie Obioma, Nigerian novelist

== Deaths ==
- January 1 – Lord David Cecil, English critic and biographer (born 1902)
- January 4 – Christopher Isherwood, English-born novelist (born 1904)
- January 7
  - P. D. Eastman, American author and illustrator (born 1909)
  - Juan Rulfo, Mexican writer, screenwriter and photographer (born 1917)
- January 9 – W. S. Graham, Scottish poet (born 1918)
- January 24 – L. Ron Hubbard, American science fiction writer, founder of Scientology (born 1911)
- January 26 – Nicholas Moore, English poet (born 1911)
- February 4 – Phyllis Shand Allfrey, Dominican writer (born 1908)
- February 9 – Dora Oake Russell, Newfoundland writer, diarist and journalist (born 1912)
- February 11 – Frank Herbert, American science fiction novelist (born 1920)
- February 27 – Nancy Brysson Morrison, Scottish novelist (born 1903)
- February 28 – Edith Ditmas, English archivist, historian and writer (born 1896)
- March 4
  - Ding Ling, Chinese fiction writer (born 1904)
  - Elizabeth Smart, Canadian poet and novelist (born 1913)
- March 15 – Pandelis Prevelakis, Greek novelist, poet, dramatist and essayist (born 1909)
- March 18 – Bernard Malamud, American novelist (born 1914)
- April 12 – Valentin Kataev, Russian novelist and dramatist (born 1897)
- April 14
  - Simone de Beauvoir, French philosopher and feminist writer (born 1908)
  - Jean Genet, French novelist, playwright, poet, essayist and political activist (born 1910)
- April 17 – Bessie Head, Botswanan fiction writer (born 1937)
- April 22 – Mircea Eliade, Romanian historian, philosopher and novelist (born 1907)
- May 15 – Theodore H. White, American journalist, historian and novelist (born 1915)
- June 14 – Jorge Luis Borges, Argentine writer (born 1899)
- July 16 – Stephen Coulter, English writer (born 1914)
- August 1 – Lena Kennedy, English romantic novelist (born 1914)
- August 3 – Beryl Markham, English-born Kenyan aviator and author (born 1902)
- August 18 – Vivian Stuart, English novelist (born 1914)
- August 20 – Milton Acorn, Canadian poet, writer and playwright (born 1923)
- September 11 – Noel Streatfeild, English novelist and children's writer (born 1895)
- October 28 – John Braine, English novelist (born 1922)
- December 17 – J. F. Hendry, Scottish poet (born 1912)
- December 19 – V. C. Andrews, American novelist (born 1923)
- December 28 – John D. MacDonald, American novelist and short story writer (born 1916)

== Awards ==
- Nobel Prize for Literature: Wole Soyinka

=== Australia ===
- The Australian/Vogel Literary Award: Robin Walton, Glace Fruits
- C. J. Dennis Prize for Poetry: Rhyll McMaster, Washing the Money and John A. Scott, St. Clair
- Kenneth Slessor Prize for Poetry: Robert Gray Selected Poems 1963–83
- Mary Gilmore Prize: Stephen Williams, A Crowd of Voices
- Miles Franklin Award: Elizabeth Jolley, The Well

=== Canada ===
- See 1986 Governor General's Awards for a complete list of winners and finalists for those awards.

=== France ===
- Prix Goncourt: Michel Host, Valet de nuit
- Prix Médicis French: Pierre Combescot, Les Funérailles de la Sardine
- Prix Médicis International: John Hawkes, Aventures dans le commerce des peaux en Alaska

=== United Kingdom ===
- Booker Prize: Kingsley Amis, The Old Devils
- Carnegie Medal for children's literature: Berlie Doherty, Granny Was a Buffer Girl
- Cholmondeley Award: Lawrence Durrell, James Fenton, Selima Hill
- Eric Gregory Award: Mick North, Lachlan Mackinnon, Oliver Reynolds, Stephen Romer
- James Tait Black Memorial Prize for fiction: Jenny Joseph, Persephone
- James Tait Black Memorial Prize for biography: D. Felicitas Corrigan, Helen Waddell
- Queen's Gold Medal for Poetry: Norman MacCaig
- Whitbread Best Book Award: Kazuo Ishiguro, An Artist of the Floating World

=== United States ===
- Agnes Lynch Starrett Poetry Prize: Robley Wilson, Kingdoms of the Ordinary
- American Academy of Arts and Letters Gold Medal for Drama: Sidney Kingsley
- Frost Medal: Allen Ginsberg / Richard Eberhart
- Nebula Award: Orson Scott Card, Speaker For the Dead
- Newbery Medal for children's literature: Patricia MacLachlan, Sarah, Plain and Tall
- Prometheus Award: Robert Shea and Robert Anton Wilson, The Illuminatus! Trilogy
- Pulitzer Prize for Drama: no award given
- Pulitzer Prize for Fiction: Larry McMurtry, Lonesome Dove
- Pulitzer Prize for Poetry: Henry Taylor, The Flying Change
- Whiting Awards: Fiction: Kent Haruf, Denis Johnson, Padgett Powell, Mona Simpson; Poetry: John Ash, Hayden Carruth, Frank Stewart, Ruth Stone; Nonfiction: Darryl Pinckney (nonfiction/fiction); Plays: August Wilson

=== Elsewhere ===
- Friedenspreis des Deutschen Buchhandels: Władysław Bartoszewski
- Premio Nadal: Manuel Vicent, Balada de Caín
