= Hiser =

Hiser may refer to:

== People ==
- Gene Hiser (born 1948), professional baseball player
- Berniece T. Hiser (1908-1995), writer

== Places ==
- Hiser, West Virginia
