= Edward Mortelmans =

English artist (1915–2008)

Edward Mortelmans (1915–2008) was an English artist and illustrator. His primary modes of expression were watercolor and black and white line drawings. He is best known for illustrating some books by Gerald Durrell, and covers for books by Edgar Rice Burroughs.

Mortelmans was a watercolor artist, who commercially practiced cover artistry and book illustration, mostly for a visual audience of children and young adults. He illustrated the cover for a number of E. R. Burroughs paperback editions for Four Square Books including The Son of Tarzan, The Beasts of Tarzan and Lost on Venus. For Pan Books in the mid-1950s he produced the covers of Saint Overboard by Leslie Charteris and for Anthony Richardson's true war adventure Wingless Victory, among others. He also did some magazine work, including cover designs for the first American pulp magazine, Argosy. He has also been associated with illustrating several series, like the Twenty Names series of Hodder and Stoughton, How and Why Wonder Books of Corgi Books and the Oxford Graded Readers series of Oxford University Press. He has produced commissioned art for the British Railways. Edward Mortelmans' illustrations have been critically acclaimed.

== Selected bibliography of illustrations ==
- Desert Victory: The Battle at Alamein, by Edward Fox (Lutterworth Press, 1967)
- The Boy with the Bronze Axe, by Kathleen Fidler (Chatto, Boyd & Oliver, 1968)
- Chiho and Tong See: A Tale of Korea by S. C. George (Chatto, Boyd & Oliver, 1969)
- Antlers of the King Moose, by Arthur Catherall (E. P. Dutton, 1970)
- Conqueror of the Night: The Story of Louis Braille, by Jeanne Christiaens, translated by Anthea Bell (Abelard - Schuman, London, 1970)
- Catch Me a Colobus, by Gerald Durrell (Collins, 1972)
- Beasts in My Belfry (A Bevy of Beasts) by Gerald Durrell (Collins, 1973)
- The Way of the Muslim by Mohammad Iqbal (Amersham Books, 1973) — a book which has gained notoriety in Europe for its contents
- Living in Samuel Pepys' London, by R J Unstead (A & C Black, 1974)
- Golden Bats and Pink Pigeons: A Journey to the Flora and Fauna of a Unique Island, by Gerald Durrell (Collins, 1977)
- Robin Hood and His Merry Men, by Enid Blyton (Collier Macmillan, 1981)
- The Sinister Airfield, by Alison Prince (Methuen Publishing, 1982)
- The Night Landings, by Alison Prince (Methuen, 1983)
- Stories of the Sea, by Erik Abranson (Hodder & Stoughton, 1983)
- The Story of the Treasure Seekers, by Edith Nesbit (Purnell, 1983)
- The River War by Winston S. Churchill (Four Square Books 1960)
- The Sensualists, by Ben Hecht (Four Square Books 1964)
