= Edwin Embleton =

English commercial & graphic designer (1907-2000)

Edwin Embleton (1907 – 2000) was a commercial and graphic designer who is widely recognised for his work in the Publications Division of the Ministry of Information during the Second World War.

His archive is located at the University of Brighton Design Archives.

== Career ==
=== Early career ===
Born in Hornsey, London, Embleton studied at Hornsey School of Art, finding work at a studio off Grays Inn Road, London. In 1924 he began work at Odhams Press as a layout and lettering artist before becoming Studio Manager.

=== World War Two ===
Embleton was seconded to the General Production Division of the Ministry of Information (MOI) at the outbreak of the Second World War in 1939, where he became Art Director and Studio Manager.

Embleton managed a team of up to seventy staff members including painters, designers, illustrators, layout artists, typographers, calligraphers, cartographers, and cartoonists. Graphic designers Reginald Mount and Eileen Evans reported to Embleton at this time.

In charge of the graphic elements of all propaganda, Embleton commissioned work from whichever artists and designers he chose. They created a vast range of high quality material, which played an important part in Britain's war effort at home and overseas. Subjects included the British forces, the Home Front and the Empire, including leaflets in Afrikaans, Arabic, Hausa, Persian, Swahili and Yoruba.

=== Post War ===
At the end of the war in 1945, Embleton returned to Odhams Press, and was awarded an MBE for his services to the war effort.

== External links and further reading ==
- Imperial War Museum, collections listing - Edwin Embleton
- Liddell Hart Centre for Military Archives, King's College London - Edwin J Embleton papers
- Lomas, Elizabeth, Guide to the Archive of Art and Design, Victoria & Albert Museum, Routledge, 2001, ISBN 978-1579583156
- National Archives - INF Records created or inherited by the Central Office of Information
- Osley, Anthony, Persuading the People: Government Publicity in the Second World War, Central Office of Information Publishing Services, 1995, ISBN 978-0117018853
- V&A, Archive of Art and Design - Edwin J Embleton, Ministry of Information collection
