= Elisabeth Meyer (photographer) =

Norwegian photographer (1899–1968)

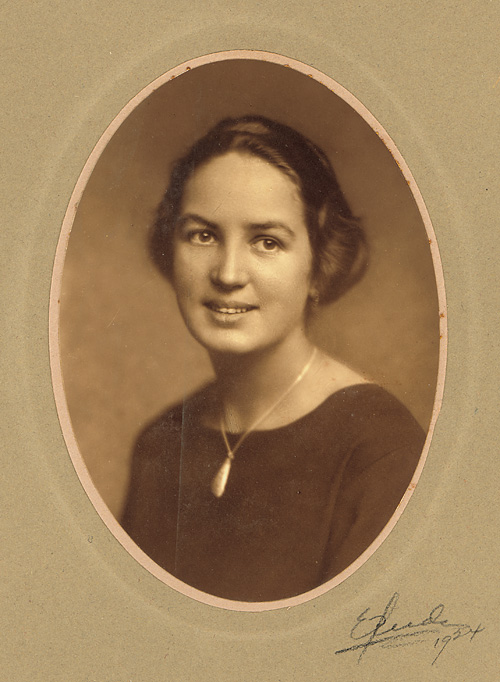
- Portrait of Elisabeth Meyer, Photo: Ernest Rude 1924.
- Born: 1899; Tønsberg, Norway
- Died: 1968 (aged 68–69)
- Occupations: photographer journalist

Elisabeth Meyer (1899 – 1968) was a Norwegian photographer and journalist who is best known for her photo-journalistic work from travels through Iran and India in the 1920s and 1930s, among them early photographs of Mahatma Gandhi. Meyer traveled through Iran on her own and may have been the first Western woman to travel through Iran in this way. There was a total ban on photographing in Iran at the time and she was arrested several times, but released with a warning. In Turkey she visited Kemal Atatürk in his private residence and his bedroom covered in pink silk. In Irak she interviewed king Faisal in his "palais just outside Baghdad". In India the young Indira Nehru helped Meyer visit the imprisoned Mahatma Gandhi, and she described the meeting like this: «Any other man would appear ridiculous in that outfit, but with regard to Gandhi all criticism is silenced. I was never particularly enthusiastic about Gandhi, but now I am completely converted. He is one of the most sympathetic humans I have ever met, he is truly a great man.» Meyer also visited Syria, Mexico and Alaska.

Meyer was born in Tønsberg to an affluent family. Her father gave her a Kodak folding camera for her travels, which seems to have led to her professional choice later. She joined the Oslo Camera Club in 1932, and then traveled to Berlin in 1937 to study photography at the Reimann School, where she studied with Walter Peterhans and Otto Croy. She worked as an apprentice for Joszef Pécsi in Budapest before returning to Norway, where she spent the war years. Meyer produced material for various publications including National Geographic Magazine and Aftenposten.

== Gallery ==
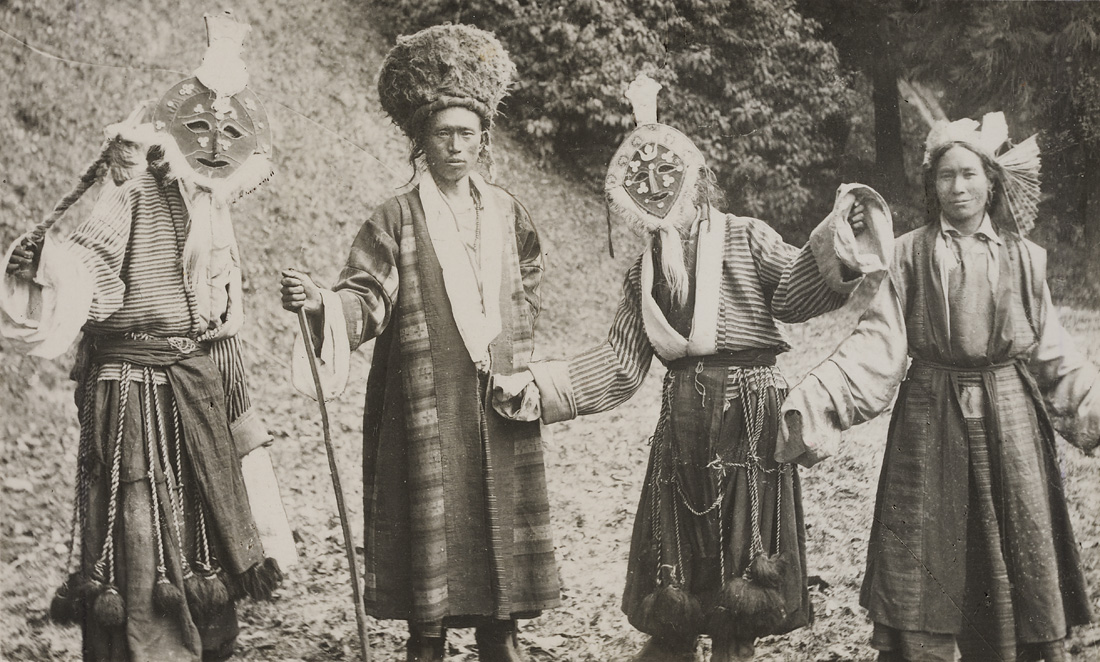
Sikkim, Tibet, 1932 (photo Preus Museum)

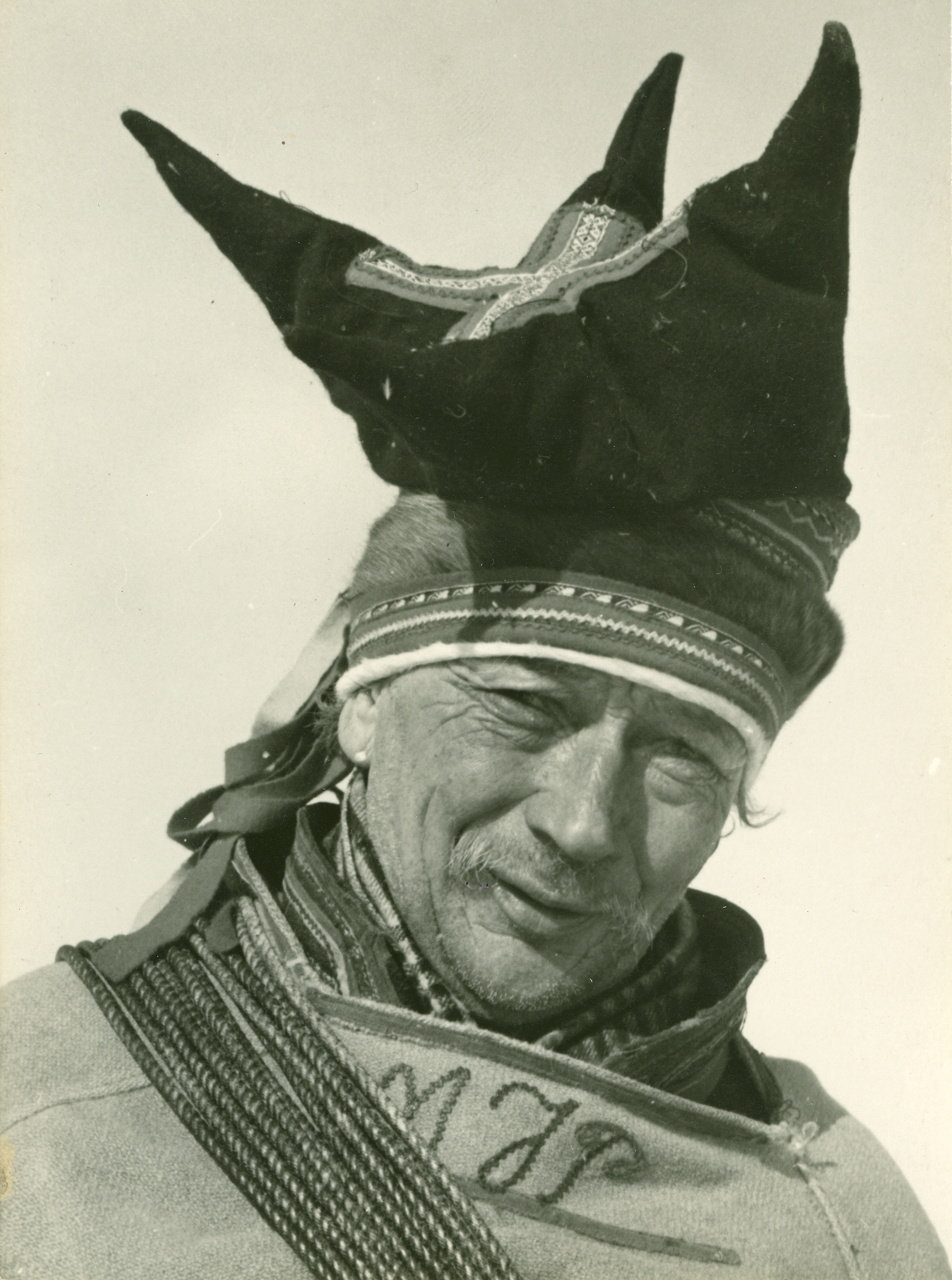
Postal guide Mattis Johansen Pentha, Norway (photo Preus Museum)
