= Cow Creek, Kentucky =

Unincorporated community in Kentucky, United States

Cow Creek
- Unincorporated community
- Location within the state of Kentucky Cow Creek (the United States)
- Coordinates: 37°26′19″N 83°36′38″W
- Country: United States
- State: Kentucky
- County: Owsley
- Elevation: 705 ft (215 m)
- Time zone: UTC-6 (Central (CST))
  - Summer (DST): UTC-5 (CST)
- GNIS feature ID: 511602

Cow Creek is an unincorporated community in Owsley County, Kentucky, United States, southeast of the county seat of Booneville. Wilson Edgar Terry lived there until 1927. Berniece T. Hiser was born there in 1908. Its post office closed in February 1957.
