= Stanley Herbert =

- Born: 27 June 1905; Oldham, Lancashire, England
- Died: 1 January 1967 (aged 61); Cambridge, Cambridgeshire, England
- Occupation: Artist
- Years active: 1930s–1960s

Herbert's signature, from his artwork for the cover of The Radio Times magazine, 8 October 1937

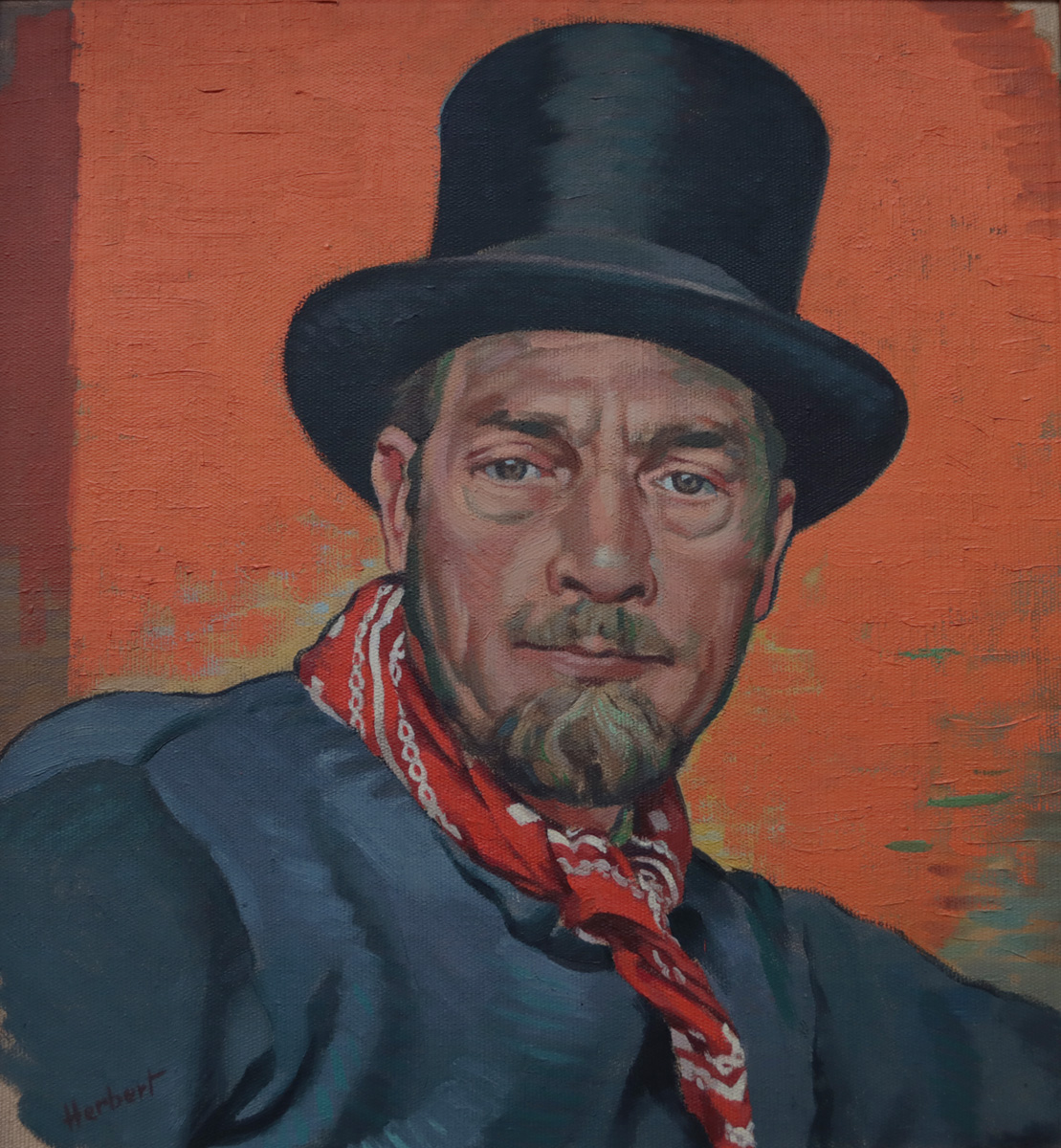
"Herbert in a High Hat" self portrait by Stanley Herbert 1955, oil on canvas 42x39cm. Private collection of artist's family

Stanley Herbert (27 June 1905 – 1 January 1967) was a British commercial artist active in the 1930s to 1960s.

Among his clients were The Radio Times, for which he painted covers, and London Transport and Imperial Airways, for both of whom he designed posters. His other clients included the RAF, BOAC, Danish Bacon and the National Savings Bank, and the children's comics 'Eagle', 'Girl' and 'Jack and Jill'. He painted the portrait of Maid Marian used as a logo for the convenience food store chain of that name, which was use until the 1980s.

He also worked in scraperboard, and illustrated a number of books. He taught poster design at the Reimann School, London.

Herbert died at Addenbrookes Hospital, Cambridge on 1 January 1967.

== Bibliography ==
Books illustrated by Herbert include:

- Wray, Fitzwater (1937). The Visitor's Book. J. M. Dent & Sons.
- Pitt, Frances (1946). Meet Us in the Garden. Lutterworth Press.
- Pitt, Frances (1947). The Year in the Countryside. Lutterworth Press.
- Madge, Kathleen (1947). The World of Living Green. Lutterworth Press.
- Balham, Harry. The Story of a Thread of Cotton. Puffin.
- Mainwaring, James (1953). British History in Strip Pictures. Odhams.
- Unstead, R.J. (1962). The Medieval scene, 787-1485.
- Unstead, R.J. (1962). Crown and Parliament, 1485-1688.
- Unstead, R.J. The Rise of Great Britain 1688-1837. A & C Black Ltd.
- Unstead, R.J. (1964). A century of change, 1837-today.
