= Wilson Edgar Terry =

American military officer (1874–1968)

- Born: March 7, 1874; Crockettsville, Breathitt County, Kentucky, U.S.
- Died: February 15, 1968 (aged 93); Cincinnati, Ohio, U.S.
- Burial place: Rose Hill Cemetery; Mason, Ohio, U.S.
- Alma mater: Lees Junior College
- Spouses: Ida Louise Kidd (m. 1902; died 1904) Ruse Wilder (m. 1906; died 1961)
- Children: 8, including Berniece
- Military career
- Branch: United States Army
- Nicknames: Willie, Bill
- Unit: 44th Regiment
- Conflicts: Spanish–American War

Wilson Edgar Terry (March 7, 1874 – February 15, 1968) was an American military officer in the Spanish–American War. At the time of his death, he was the oldest living veteran born in Kentucky. He was appointed a Kentucky Colonel in 1962.

== Early life ==
Wilson Edgar Terry was born on March 7, 1874, in Crockettsville, Breathitt County, Kentucky, to Sytha (née Caudill) and Isaac Terry. He graduated from Lees Junior College.

== Career ==
After leaving school, Terry joined Company G of the 44th Regiment of the U.S. Army on September 19, 1899. He served in the Philippines during the Spanish–American War. He served two years and was discharged when his unit mustered out on June 30, 1901.

In 1902, Terry became a member of the Old Regular Baptist Church in Cow Creek, Kentucky. In 1926, he became a preacher there. While in Kentucky, he worked as a farmer and notary public. He also lived in Kings Mills, Ohio. He managed a general store there. He also lived in Mason, Ohio. He was a Republican.

On April 24, 1962, Governor Bert T. Combs appointed him a Kentucky Colonel.

== Personal life ==
In 1902, Terry married Ida Louise Kidd. They had one daughter, Grace Elizabeth. His wife died in 1904. On December 24, 1906, he married Ruse Wilder of Owsley County. They had five daughters and two sons, Berniece, Viola, Arlie, Audrey, Doris, Oakley L. and Howard C. His wife died in 1961. Throughout his life, he lived in Owsley, Perry and Boone counties. In late life, he moved in with his daughter in Logan, Indiana. He went by the nicknames in Willie and Bill.

Terry entered the Veteran's Hospital in Cincinnati on November 11, 1967. He died there on February 15, 1968, following a bladder operation. He was buried at Rose Hill Cemetery in Mason, Ohio. At the time of his death, he was the oldest living veteran born in Kentucky.
