= Reimann School =

Former art school in Berlin, Germany

Coordinates: 51°29′38.55″N 0°7′57.16″W

Reimann School of Art and Design
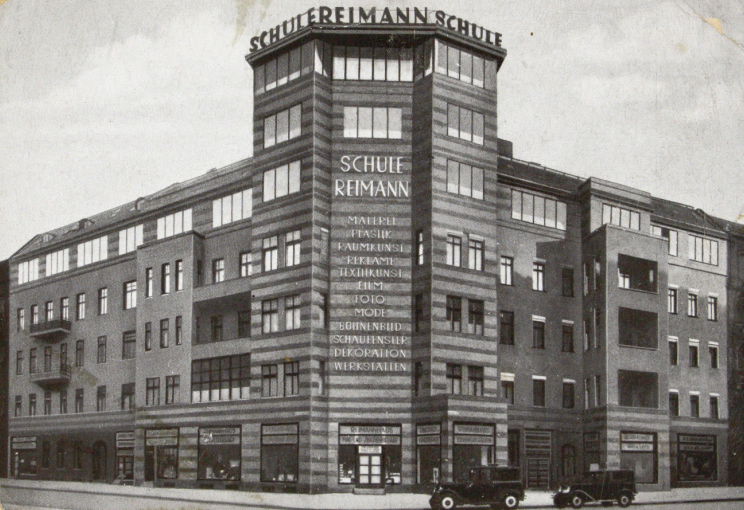
- The Reimann Art School in Berlin
- Active: 1902–1939 or 1940
- Principal: Austin Cooper
- Location: Berlin; London

The Reimann School of Art and Design was a private art school which was founded in Berlin in 1902 by Albert Reimann, and re-established in Regency Street, Pimlico, London in January 1937 after persecution by the Nazis. It was the first commercial art school in Britain.

The school closed at the outbreak of World War II and its premises were subsequently destroyed by bombing.

== Notable staff ==
Staff in Berlin included Walter Peterhans, Werner Graeff.

In London, (Florence) Louise Clarke Aldred (1910–1997) was head of textiles from 1939. Stanley Herbert taught poster design and another poster designer, Austin Cooper, was principal. Other staff included Walter Nurnberg (a student from the Berlin school), Richard Hamilton, Leonard Rosoman, Eric Fraser, Milner Gray and Merlyn Evans.

== Alumni ==
The school's alumni included :

=== Berlin ===
- Jacqueline Diffring
- Natasha Kroll
- Elisabeth Meyer
- Walter Nurnberg
- Alma Siedhoff-Buscher
- Henry Talbot
- Mauricio Amster

=== London ===
- Bruce Angrave
- Agatha Christie
- Dorrit Dekk
- Eileen Evans
- Richard Hamilton
- Anneliese Juda
- Jon Miller
- Hans Arnold Rothholz
- Iris Birtwistle
- Marianne Steiner (nee Esberg)
