= Lena Kennedy =

English author

- Born: 15 June 1914; Hoxton, London, U.K.
- Died: 1 August 1986 (aged 72)
- Occupation: Writer

Lena Kennedy (15 June 1914 – 1 August 1986), was an English author. Her books were mostly historic romantic fiction set in and around the East End of London where she lived for all her life. Some of her books, including her autobiography, were published posthumously.

She appeared, as a subject, on the television programme This Is Your Life shortly before her death in 1986.

== Biography ==
Lena Kennedy grew up in Hoxton, an area in the London Borough of Hackney. She attended Gospel Street school, leaving at fourteen to work in a tailoring factory. Her father was Cornelius Erin Kennedy and her mother Margaret Murphy were Irish immigrants from Cork. On 13 April 1938 she married Frederick George Smith and they had two children. Her first novel was published when she was sixty-four, and she went on to write sixteen best-selling books.

Kennedy died from cancer in 1986.

Her literary career was commemorated with a blue plaque in 1995.

== Bibliography ==
=== Fiction ===
- Maggie (1979)
- Autumn Alley (1980)
- Kitty (1981)
- Nelly Kelly (1981)
- Lizzie (1983)
- Lady Penelope (1983)
- Susan (1985)
- Lily, My Lovely (1985)
- Down Our Street (1987)
- Dandelion Seed (1988)
- Eve's Apples (1989)
- Inn on the Marsh (1989)
- Owen Oliver (1990)
- Kate of Clyve Shore (collection) (1992)
- Ivy of the Angel (collection) 1993)
- Queenie's Castle (1994)

=== Autobiographical works ===
- Away to the Woods: The Autobiography of Lena Kennedy (1995)
