= Walter Nurnberg =

British industrial photographer

Walter Nurnberg OBE
- Born: 18 April 1907
- Died: 19 October 1991 (aged 84)
- Citizenship: British
- Occupation: Photographer
- Years active: 1945–1970s

Walter Nurnberg OBE (18 April 1907 – 19 October 1991) was a German-born British photographer known for his industrial photography from 1945 to the 1970s, which he worked on alongside his wife, Rita Nurnberg (née Kern; born 1914).

Nurnberg is credited for his use of cinematographic lighting techniques, used in New Objectivity and Bauhaus-style photography, which he used in his early advertising work and later work in industry. His photography's central character is brought about by its interplay between machines and people, as well as the physical processes that the industrial workers carried out. He published two books on lighting in the 1940s which became standard texts in Britain and which continued to receive reprints in the 1970s.

== Early life and education ==
Nurnberg was brought up in Berlin. He was deeply interested in the arts and originally hoped to become a musician, but later turned towards training to be a banker instead, the same career as his father. In 1931, when working as a management consultant with the finance director of a private school of art and design, the Reimann School in Berlin, he became interested in its New Objectivity approach, and abandoned his financial career to enrol on its photography course, which had been newly created. The unique ethos of the school shaped his approach to photography, particularly its close relationship with industry, and under the tutelage of former Bauhaus student Werner Graeff, he learned to photograph manual work from an angle above, in the same way that "workers themselves see it", according to Graeff. His approach to lighting was also influenced strongly by Helmar Lerski. Nurnberg's work was published in the school's journal Farbe und Form.

== Career ==
Following the significant threat posed to the Reimann School following Hitler's rise to power in January 1933, Nurnberg was forced to move to England in 1933 or 1934, taking his work from Farbe und Form with him. He lodged in Finchley and became acquainted with the daughter of his hosts, Rita Kern, also a photographer working for Gee & Watson, a commercial studio based in Holborn and known as pioneers of process engraving. He set himself up as an advertising and commercial photographer, and began working from a rented studio in Aldwych House, Holborn. His first large assignment was to advertise General Post Office greetings telegrams.

In 1937, when the Reimann School was driven out of Germany by the Nazis, it re-established itself in London, opening on 12 January. Here, Nurnberg became a part-time teacher. He also wrote for Focal Press at this time under Andor Kraszna‐Krausz. With the declaration of World War II in September 1939, Nurnberg and Kern became enemy aliens in Britain and Nurnberg's cameras were confiscated, though Rita was determined exempt and was allowed to continue working as a professional photographer's assistant. He published his first book Lighting for Photography: Means and Methods that year, which became a bestseller. He married Rita in 1941. Nurnberg served in the Royal Pioneer Corps of the British Army. His experience in the Army brought him into contact with a wide variety of people, and he gained a respect for workers' craft and skill as well as their dignity and integrity through this.

Nurnberg found a return to advertising following the war distasteful, and instead became interested in the changing world of industrial Britain under the new Labour government and thus delved into industrial photography; he later stated that "'the craft age was coming to an end. The whole relationship of people to work [...] to their own families was being reshaped […]. I felt I really stood on the threshold of great events." In the following years Nurnberg was commissioned by a range of industrial companies including Imperial Chemical Industries, Mullard, British Steel, Alcan Aluminium and English Electric. In 1946, he was commissioned by United Steel Companies which asked him to produce images for their technical catalogues not printed since the start of World War II, in which he focused on "the human element and craftsmanship". The cover of the January/February 1947 edition of the magazine Photography featured his photograph Cleaning Copper in a Brewery, commissioned by Taylor Walker & Co for their Limehouse and Clerkenwell breweries; it is the first example of his work to be explicitly labelled as industrial photography. He took several commissions in Norwich from 1947 to 1950, including of its Riverside Works, Esdelle Works, and Chapelfield Works, and he returned to the latter factory in 1958 and 1961.

He published his second guidebook, Lighting for Portraiture: Technique and Application in 1948, which was also successful, and he became a Roman Catholic in the 1950s. Walter and Rita self-published the limited edition book Men and Machines in 1954 to commemorate the end of their touring exhibitions; it includes a selection of 44 images taken between 1946 and 1953, and bookends the most prolific phase of their careers.

In 1964, Nurnberg's photographs of electronics were featured in the exhibition "The Eye in Industry", notably featuring less of a "human touch" due to the rise of automation in industry at this time. Walter and Rita's approach to photography would be perceived as increasingly unviable, with fellow photographer A. M. Devlin stating in response that he struggled to picture "a production line worker achieving dignity as he applied another nut to another bolt for the 5000th time." In 1968, Nurnberg became head of Photography at the Guildford School of Art, later part of the West Surrey College of Art and Design, and was present during the student unrest and sit-in taking place at the time. He later taught at Polytechnic of Central London. In 1983, he was the subject of a revival of interest in relation to industrial photography, and released a Kodak exhibition called The Enchantment of Architecture which toured Britain for three years.

== Death and legacy ==
On his retirement in 1974, Nurnberg received an OBE for his services to industrial photography and industry, as well as an Honorary Fellowship of the British Institute of Professional Photography, a Fellowship of the Royal Photographic Society and the Hood Medal which was awarded to him in 1960 for outstanding advances in photography for the public service. Following his death at the age of 84 on 19 October 1991, his work formed the Nurnberg Archive at the National Museum of Photography, Film & Television (now the National Science and Media Museum) in 2004 after it was donated by his family. His Norwich work was exhibited at Norwich Castle Museum in 2024.

== Techniques and philosophy ==
Nurnberg often used a tripod-mounted field or technical camera for his more commercial work. For his more dynamic works, he made use of a handheld Rolleiflex twin-lens reflex camera, which included a top-mounted focusing screen and which was often used by press photographers. He often ridiculed the use of 35mm cameras for any professional use other than photojournalism. He used Bauhaus-influenced cinematographic lighting techniques, often supported by large numbers of angled spotlights and large flash equipment.

He frequently made his first inspection of a site without any camera and endeavoured to talk to people at all levels of authority, collecting factual information to prepare before returning to take the photographs. This included the preparation of a detailed "shooting script" for clients to review. He also frequently required that a factory should stop production for the duration of a shoot, though frequently produced many pictures in return, for example producing 700 photographs for his United Steel commission.

With a strong spiritual view of architecture, he believed that physical labour had a spiritual value and that the works of man were a high achievement in this way. He saw light and shadow as psychological forces, using them in his work to convey mood and atmosphere, and writing in an early essay that "light is the medium which, combined with the camera, gives the photographer every chance not only to overcome but to remove the objectivity of the lens." He became particularly interested in the human hand, writing in 1962 that hands "divulge character and human nature undisguised", "have throughout the ages held a symbolic significance", and that "even in a world of automation and mechanical handling the hand of man is still operative, and remains not only just a symbol but a living expression of human genius and adaptability".
