= Hans Arnold Rothholz =

German-born graphic artist (1919–2000)

Hans Arnold Rothholz FSIA
- Hans Arnold Rothholz, photographed at an uncertain date
- Born: 1919; Dresden, Germany
- Died: 2000
- Education: Willesden School of Art; Reimann School, London
- Occupation: Graphic designer
- Employers: Royal Society for the Prevention of Accidents; Wembley Stadium; Festival of Britain; Ealing Studios
- Children: 1 (Stephen)

Hans Arnold Rothholz FSIA (1919–2000) was a poster designer and graphic artist born in Dresden, Germany, who immigrated to Britain in 1933. Interned as an enemy alien during the early part of the Second World War, he designed posters for the Royal Society for the Prevention of Accidents and other clients including Wembley Stadium, Ealing Studios and other major clients between 1942 and the 1960s. Along with fellow designers Tom Eckersley, George Him and Abram Games, he has been credited with "transform[ing] visual communication in Britain".

== Early life and education ==
Rothholz was born in Dresden in 1919. He was from a Jewish family, and fled to Britain from Germany's persecution of the Jews in 1933. As a boy, he was active in the scouting movement.

Rothholz began his artistic training at Willesden School of Art in northwest London, then studied commercial art and display design at the Reimann School, London – a successor of the renowned Reimann Schule in Berlin – between 1938 and 1939. He was one of the few students to receive the Reimann School Diploma. He was inspired by the Bauhaus movement, then popular in Germany but relatively unknown in Britain.

== Career ==
Rothholz worked at the Window Display in Maidstone, Kent, until 1940, when he was interned as an enemy alien in Canada, Liverpool, and on the Isle of Man. He returned to London in 1942 where he established a successful career as a graphic and information designer.

Rothholz designed posters for various clients, including the Post Office and the Royal Society for the Prevention of Accidents (RoSPA). He also designed promotional material for Wembley Stadium which included the 1948 Olympic Games.

In 1951, Rothholz was commissioned to work on the Land Travelling Exhibition as part of the Festival of Britain. He also designed film posters for Ealing Studios. Rothholz's other clients from the 1950s included BEA, BOAC, Perera, Lyons & Co and Splendida. Rothholz also designed the programme for the 1957 World Scout Jamboree.

In the 1960s, Rothholz designed graphic schemes and murals for the Bacon & Egg and Grill & Cheese restaurant chains, operated by J. Lyons and Co. Throughout the 1960s, Rothholz re-branded Winsor & Newton art materials, and towards the end of the decade, he created a new corporate identity for the Wellcome Foundation, including packaging, vehicle liveries and stationery. In 1961 Rothholz was asked to design the Society of Industrial Artists' (SIA) showcase exhibition The Art of Persuasion, and was elected a Fellow of the Society of Industrial Artists in 1962. He also served on the SIA's Council.

== Legacy ==
As a friend and colleague of Tom Eckersley, George Him and Abram Games, Rothholz belonged to a generation of designers credited with transforming visual communication in Britain.

Rothholz's son, Stephen, was also a designer and assisted with the cataloguing of his father's archive.

=== Posthumous exhibitions ===
Rothholz's posters are featured in many public collections, including the Imperial War Museum, the Victoria and Albert Museum and the London Transport Museum, and his archive is located at University of Brighton Design Archives. In 2006, British clothing designer Margaret Howell exhibited a collection of Rothholz's posters at her flagship Wigmore Street store, and in 2007 produced a calendar of his poster designs.

BFI Southbank displayed a selection of original posters, photographs and press material from Ealing Studios in 2012, including Rothholz's poster for They Came to a City (1945).

== Gallery ==
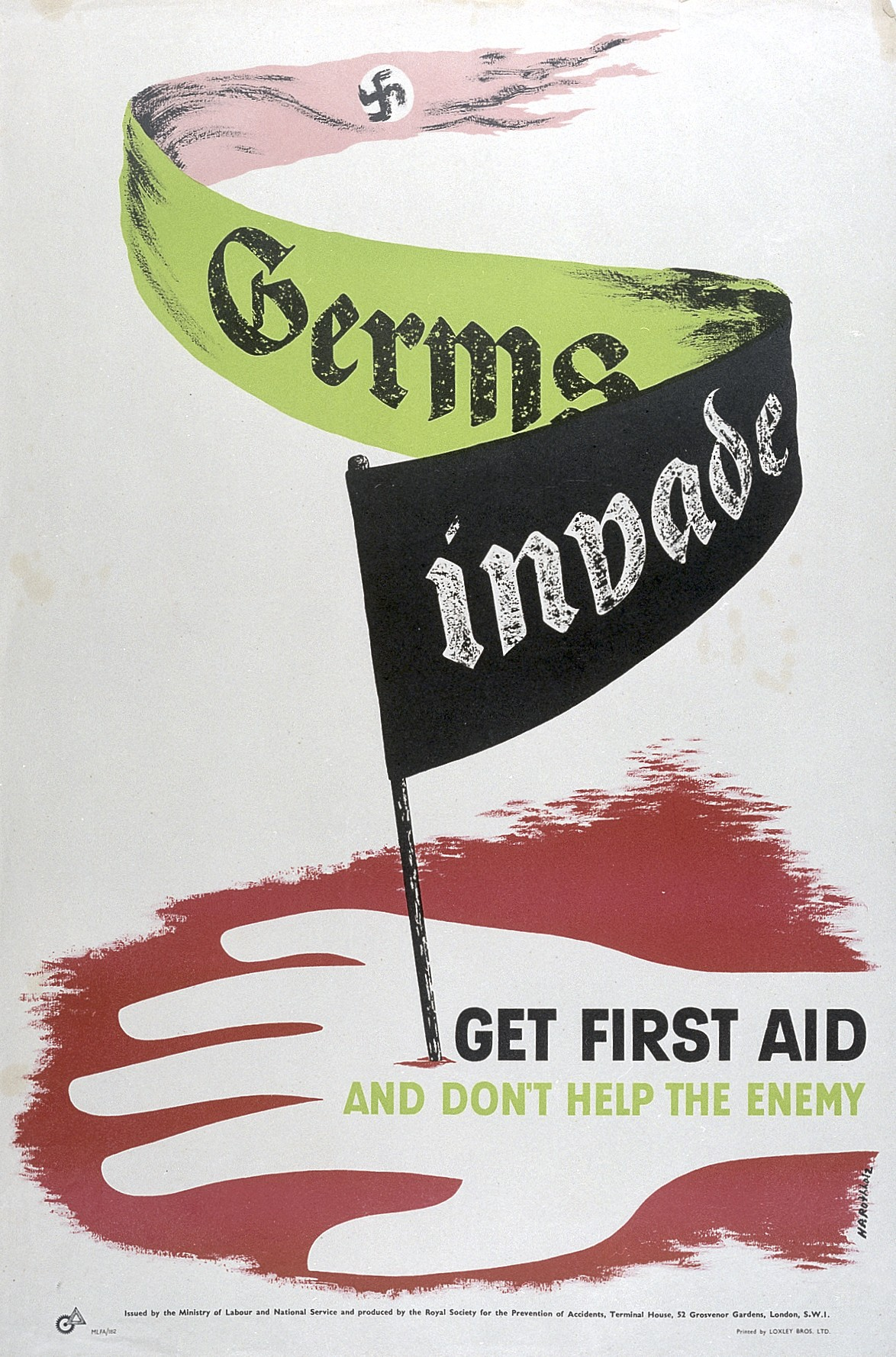
Germs Invade: Get First Aid (Wellcome L0026443)

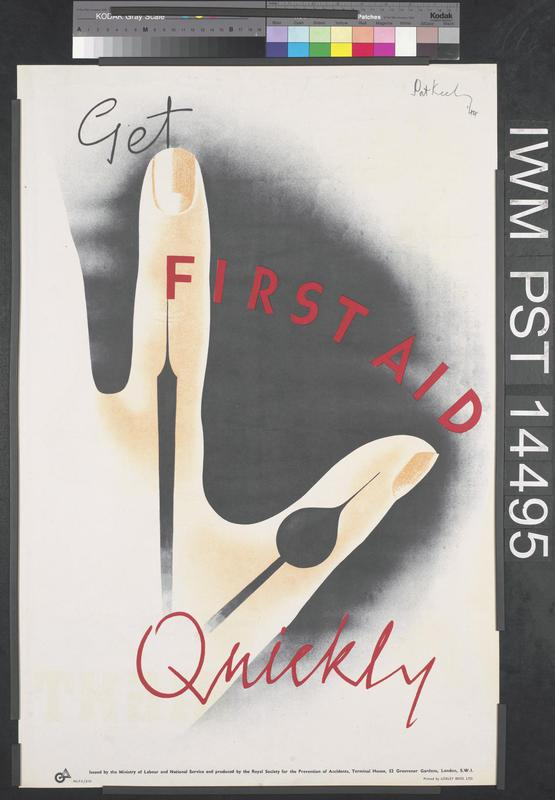
Get First Aid Quickly (IWMPST14495)

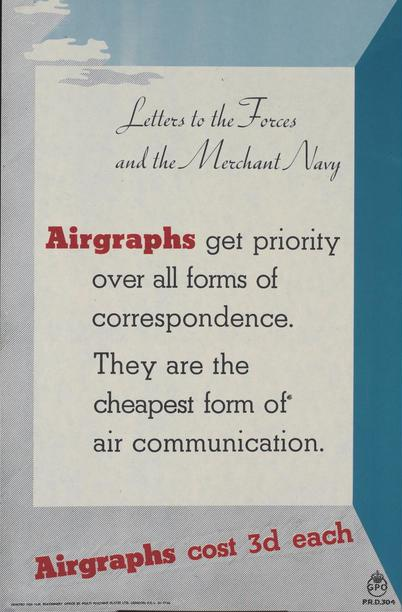
Letters to the Forces and the Merchant Navy (IWMPST10029)

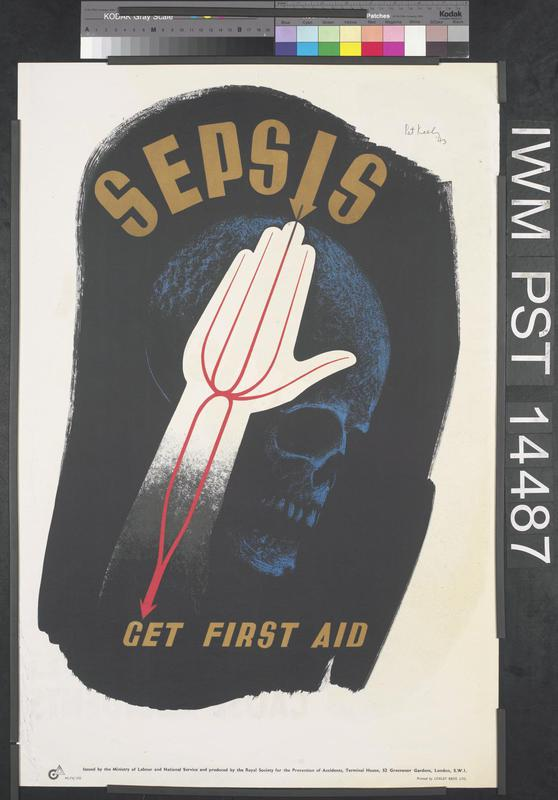
Sepsis: Get First Aid (IWMPST14487)

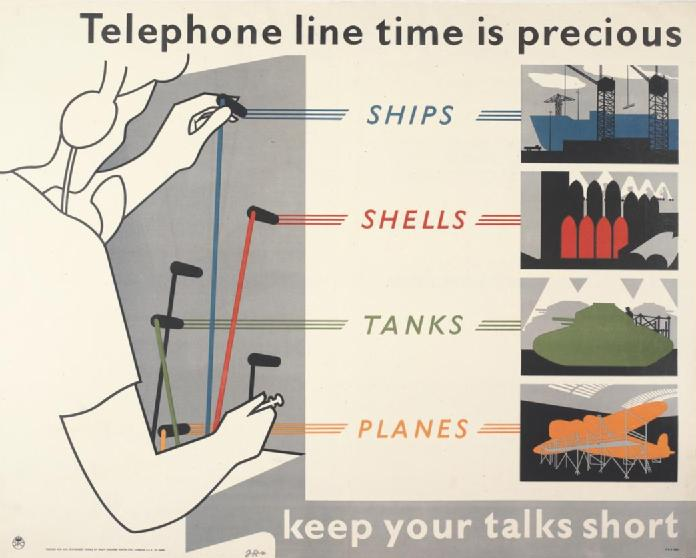
Telephone Line Time is Precious (IWMPST4037)
