= Reginald Mount =

British graphic designer (1906–1979)

- Born: Edward Reginald Mount; 4 July 1906
- Died: 31 January 1979 (aged 72)
- Occupation: Graphic designer
- Organization: Ministry of Information (United Kingdom)

Edward Reginald Mount (4 July 1906 – 31 January 1979) was a British graphic designer.

== Early career ==
Mount was born Edward Reginald Mount, on 4 July 1906. He worked as a designer for various advertising agencies in London in the 1930s, then joined the Ministry of Information at the outbreak of the Second World War.

== Second World War ==
Throughout the war, Mount worked extensively with the designer Eileen Evans. Together, they produced many posters for the Ministry's public awareness and propaganda campaigns, including their renowned anti-venereal disease campaign of 1943–1944. Other designer colleagues in the Ministry of Information's "general division" included Maurice V. Bennett and Kenneth Bird, better known as the cartoonist 'Fougasse'. Their work was overseen by the Ministry's studio manager, Edwin Embleton.

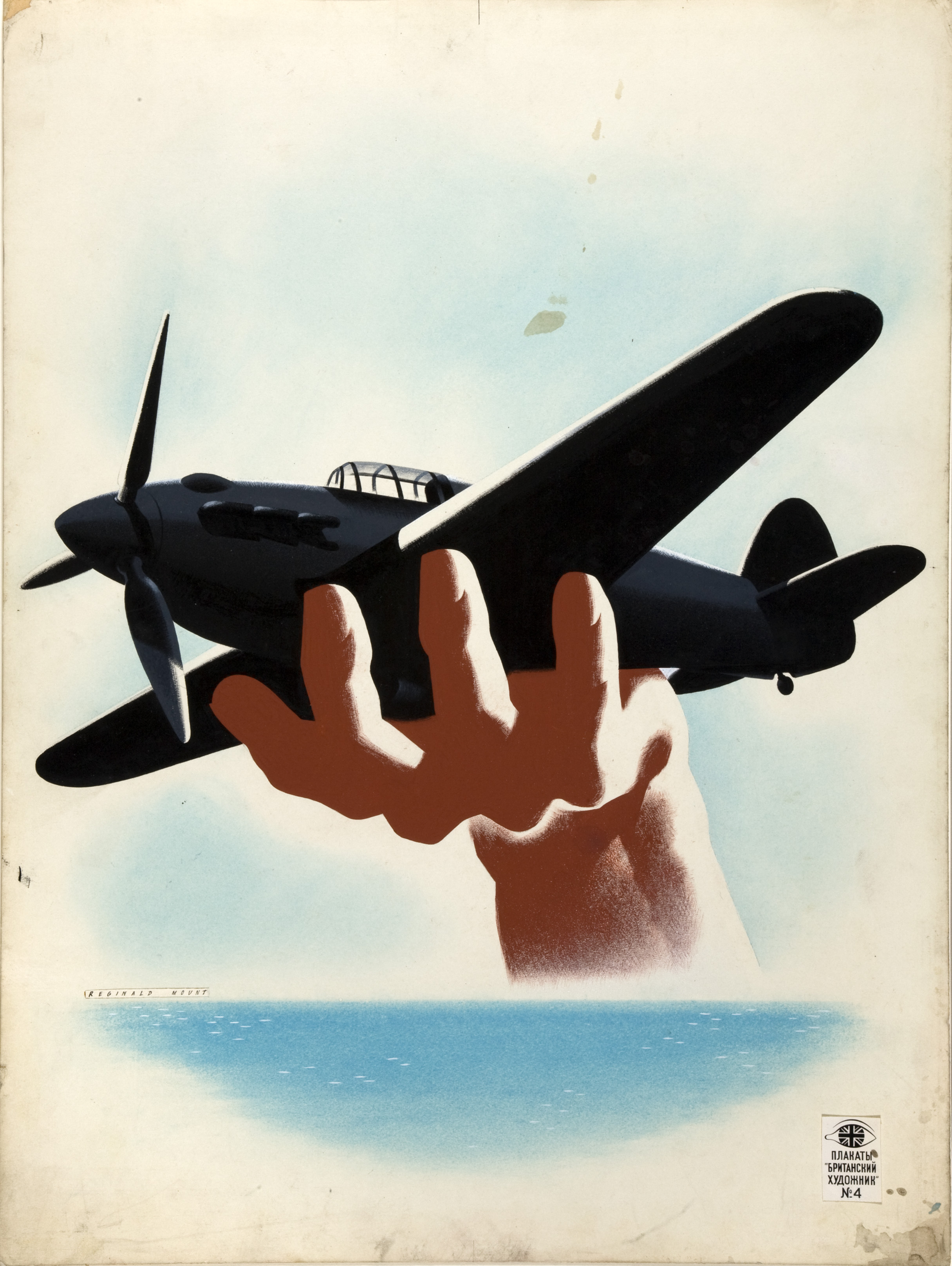
One of Mount's Unity of Strength posters, showing a Hawker Hurricane carried by a hand representing the merchant navy, intended for export to the Soviet Union

Some time after 1941, he worked on a series of posters probably intended for export to the Soviet Union (they were accompanied by Russian text). The example pictured shows a hand, representing the merchant navy carrying a Hawker Hurricane to the USSR, to reinforce the Soviet air force.

Several of his wartime works depict an anthropomorphised, cartoon-style incendiary bomb, 'Fire-bomb Fritz'.

== Post-war career ==
Mount was subsequently a founding member of the Artist Partners agency, which was established in 1950 by the agent Donovan Candler in Lower John Street, Soho, London. Mount continued to work in partnership with Eileen Evans. In the 1950s and 1960s, their 'Mount/Evans studio' became closely associated with the post-war Central Office of Information, producing designs for a wide variety of government agencies. Mount also designed the cinema poster for the British comedy film The Ladykillers.

Mount died on 31 January 1979.

== Collections ==
His work is in collections including those of The National Archives, The Science Museum, and the Victoria and Albert Museum.

== Selected works ==
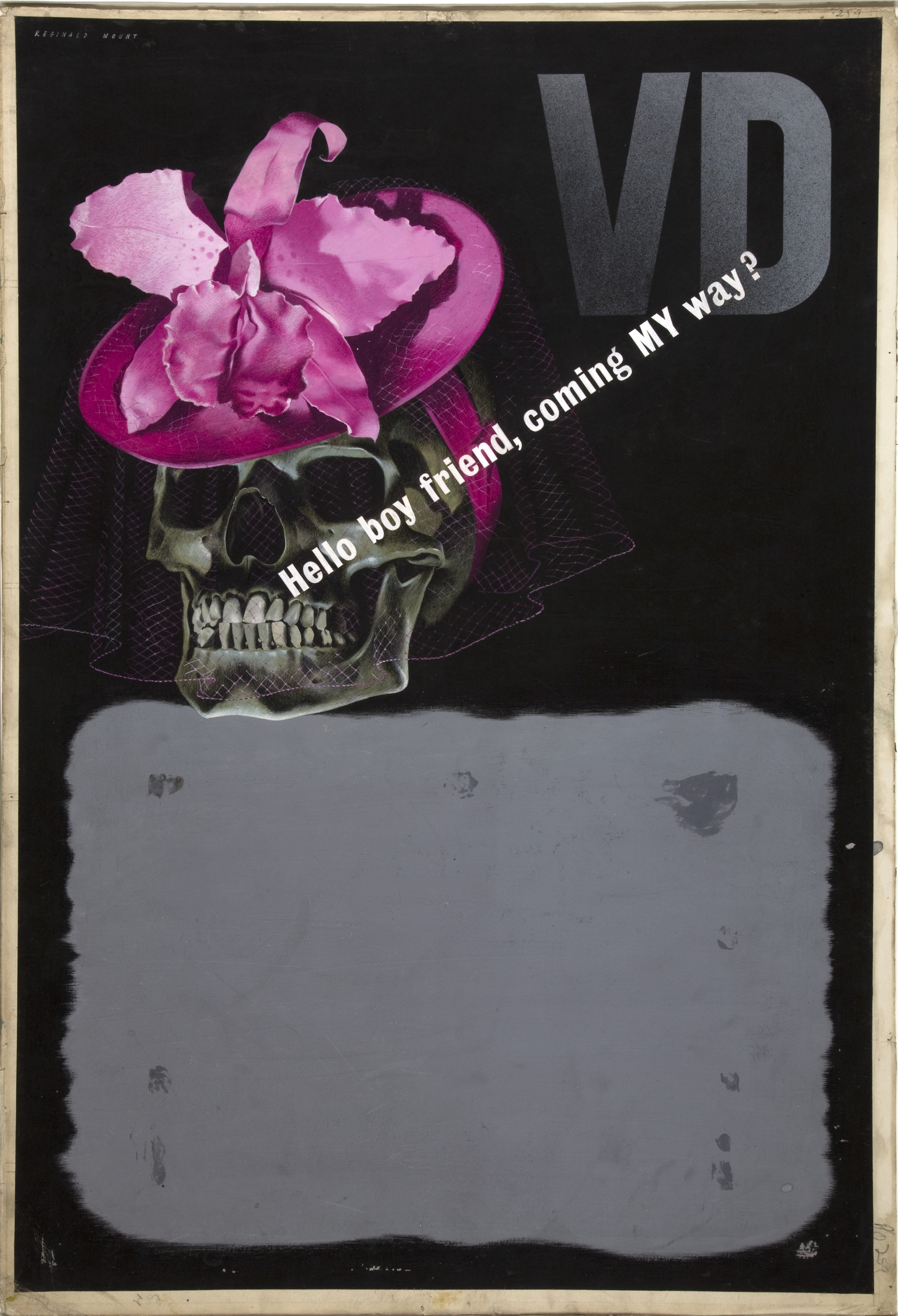
Anti-venereal disease poster for the Ministry of Information

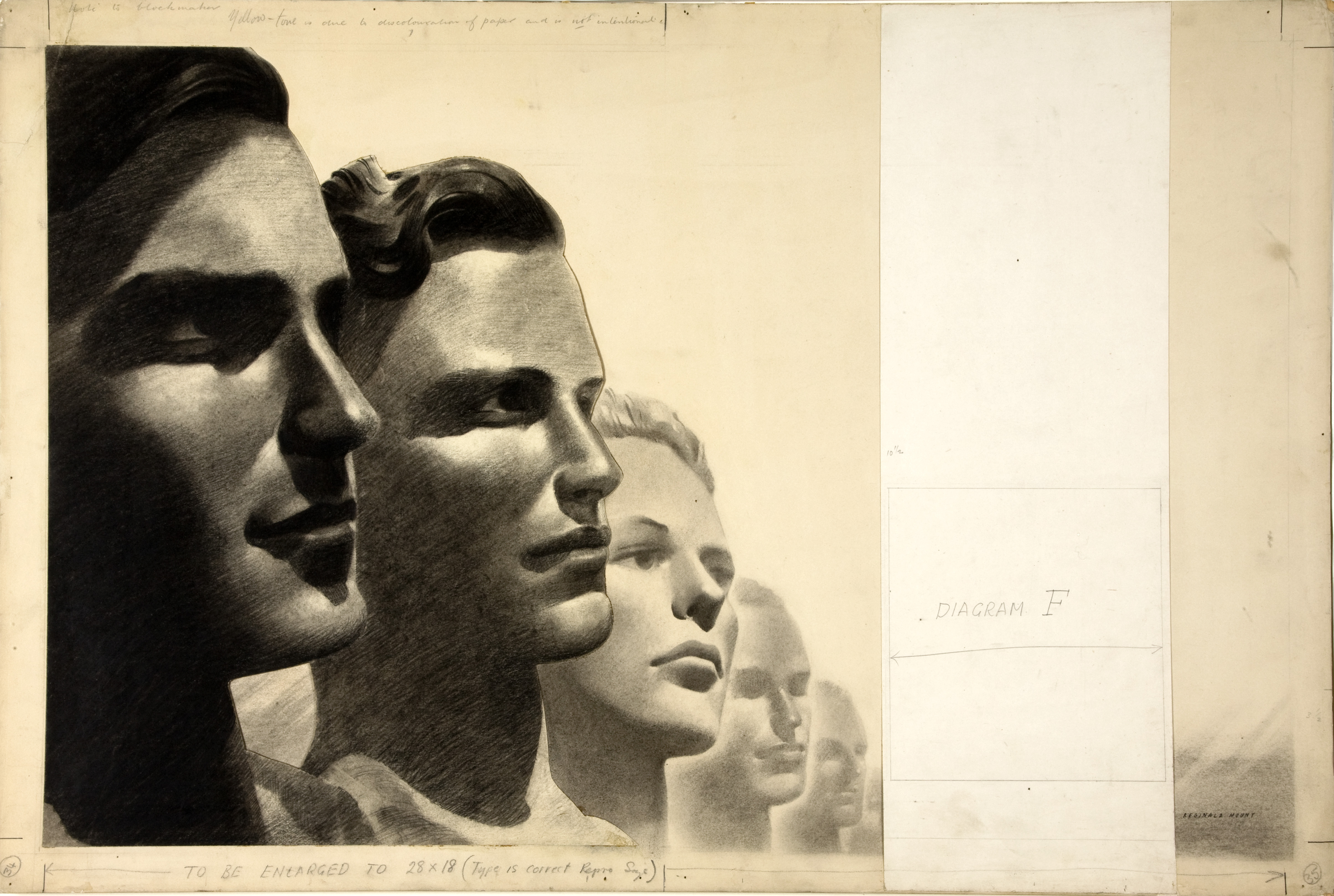
Unity of Strength poster, wartime

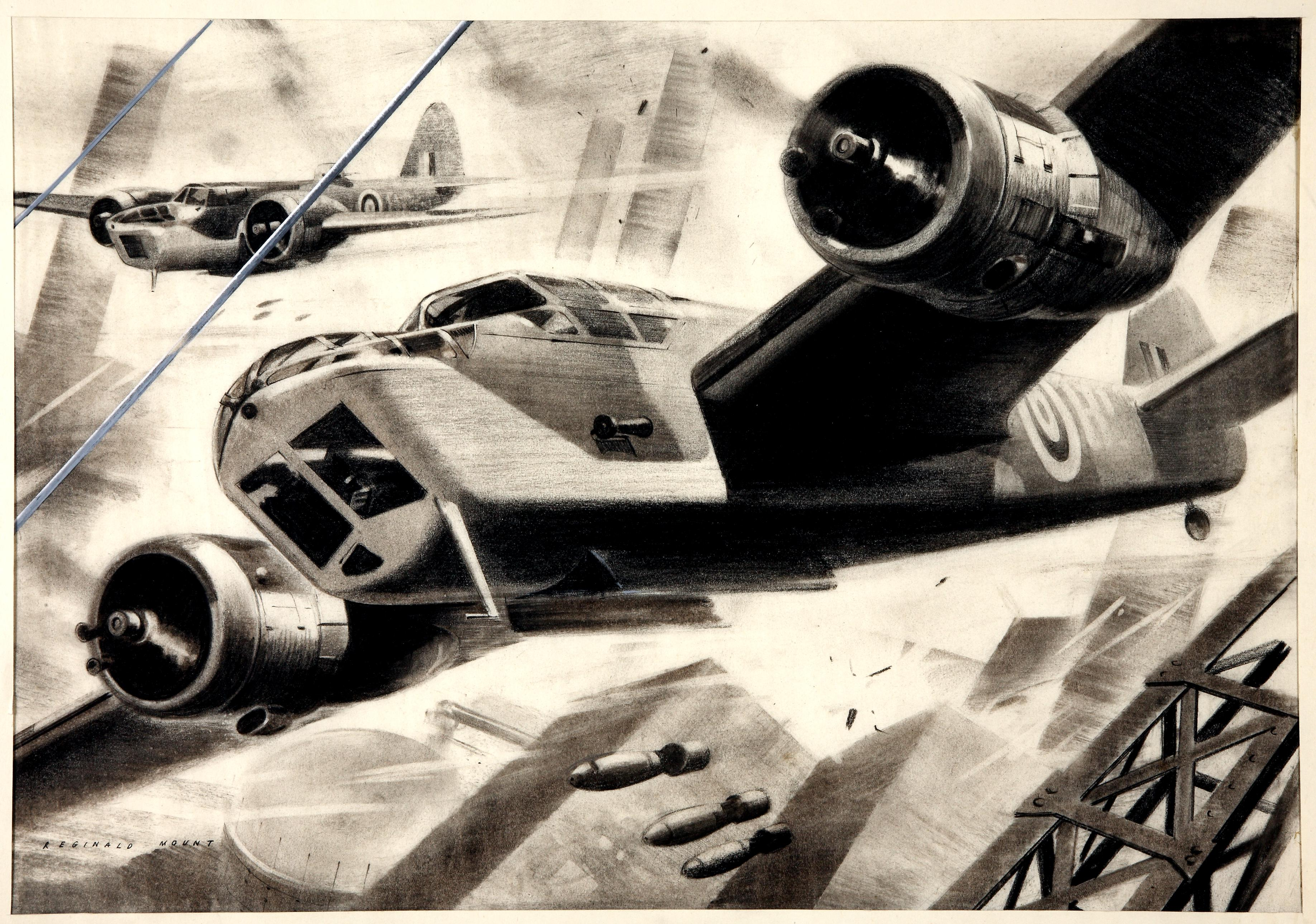
Poster featuring Wing Commander H. I. Edwards and an RAF bombing raid

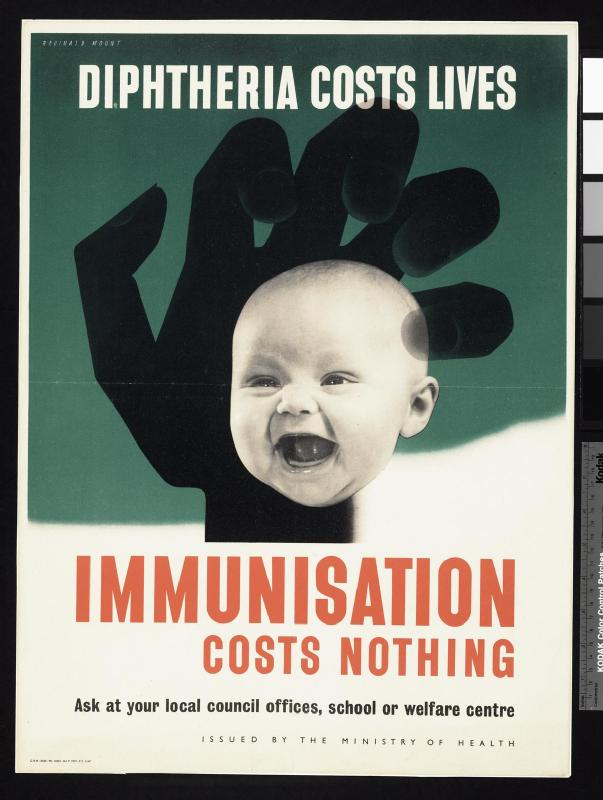
Diphtheria Costs Lives — Immunisation Costs Nothing, post-war immunisation campaign
