= The Others (novel) =

1986 novel by Alison Prince

- Author: Alison Prince
- Language: English
- Publication date: 1986

The Others is a 1986 novel by Alison Prince. In the novel, people are subject to physical and mental programming to perform their job functions, in a post-holocaust setting.

== Reception ==
Dave Langford reviewed The Others for White Dwarf #82, and stated that "Not desperately convincing in its resolution [...] but otherwise it's tense and gritty stuff. Rather than being miraculously preserved to the final, likable characters can die."

== Reviews ==
- Review by Sue Thomason (1987) in Vector 136
- Review by Ken Brown (1987) in Interzone, #19 Spring 1987
