= Eileen Evans =

British graphic designer

Eileen Margaret Evans (8 November 1921 - August 2006) was a British graphic designer who co-founded the Mount/Evans design studio with graphic designer, Reginald Mount after World War II.

== Biography ==
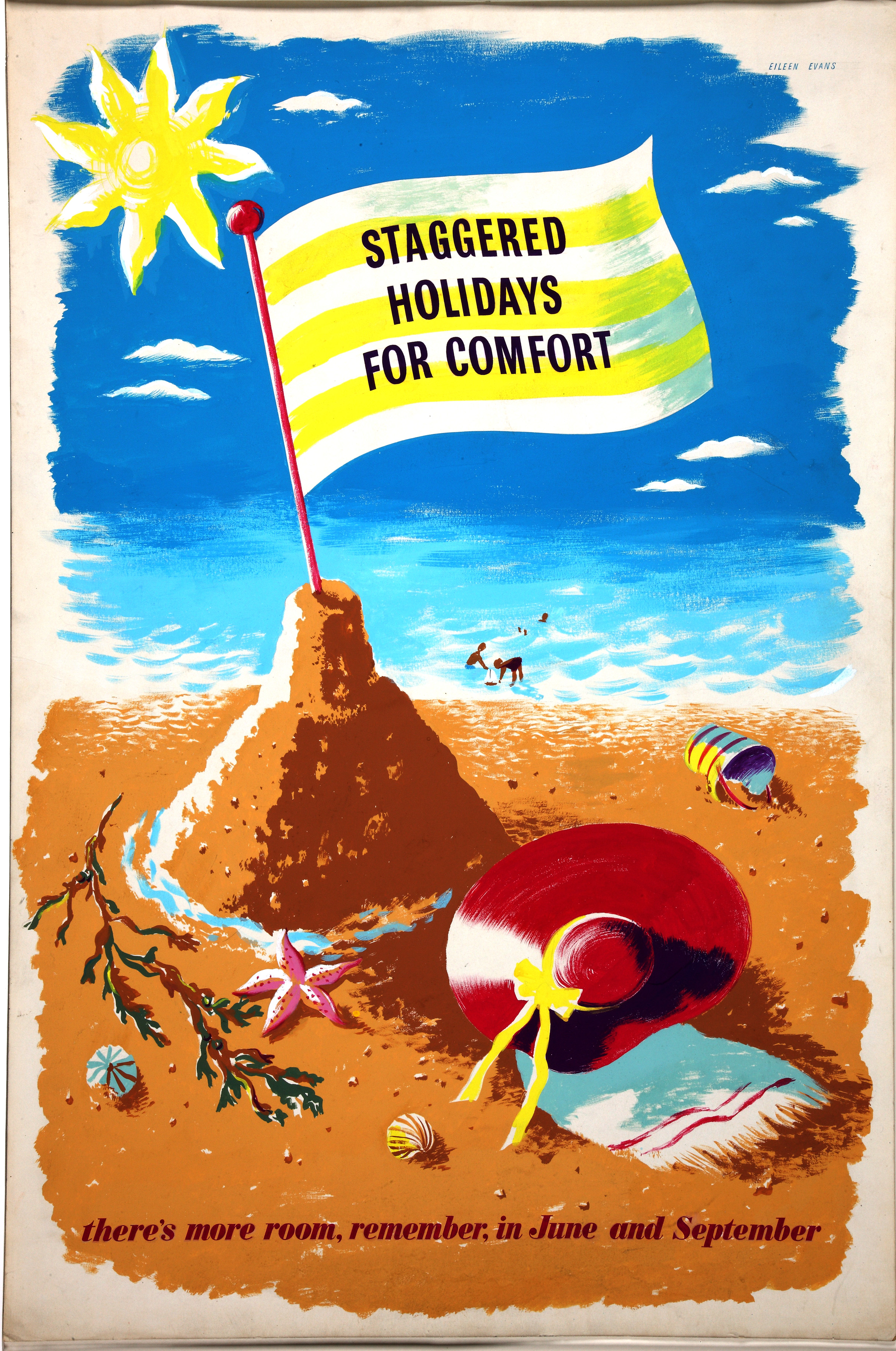
Staggered Holidays For Comfort, from The National Archives (United Kingdom), Eileen Evans.

Evans studied commercial art at the Reimann School in London, graduating in 1939. Evans selected this school expressly due to its reputation for providing good employment opportunities. Shortly afterwards, she joined the Ministry of Information (which later became the Central Office of Information or COI).

During the war Evans and Mount worked together at the Ministry of Information designing many public information and propaganda posters. Evans also created posters independently of Mount, including at least one recruitment poster for farm workers, plus several for the Lend A Hand on the Land campaign which encouraged city families to take working holidays to help with wartime harvests.

Evans is one of the featured artists in the National Archives 'The Art of War' collection. Her collaborative work with Mount is also included in the Victoria and Albert Museum collections. Their anti-smoking and road safety posters won awards.

In their joint work and commissions, Evans was responsible for the typography and layout of the posters. Their partnership continued into the 1950s and 1960s with posters such as The Parachute Regiment for the British Army Recruiting Office, the 1967 Britain in Montreal poster for the Department of Trade and further work for the Department of Health.
