= Blue Eyes, Black Hair =

1986 novel by Marguerite Duras

- First US edition
- Author: Marguerite Duras
- Original title: Les Yeux bleus cheveux noirs
- Translator: Barbara Bray
- Language: French
- Publisher: Les Éditions de Minuit (France); Pantheon Books (US); Collins (UK)
- Publication date: 1 November 1986
- Publication place: France
- English publication date: 1987
- Pages: 155
- ISBN: 2-7073-1067-0

Blue Eyes, Black Hair (French: Les Yeux bleus cheveux noirs) is a 1986 novel by the French writer Marguerite Duras. It tells the story of a couple who meet by chance in a small vacation town. The man is homosexual and has recently fallen in love with a man with blue eyes and black hair. After meeting the woman at a cafe, he pays the woman to come to his room so that he can look at her, presumably in order to learn something about women or love.

== Reception ==
Robert Steiner reviewed the book in the Los Angeles Times: "Blue Eyes, Black Hair is one of those minor erotic fictions that contemporary French literature celebrates. One finds it in Bataille, Blanchot and Robbe-Grillet—the familiar business of sex and death at a seascape, with parched characters whose sexual obsessions are poetry and whose longing becomes mordant philosophy[.]" Steiner continued: "The problem with this novel is that in its effort to evoke mystery, it is woefully precious and sentimental. The characters do not so much feel as wax poetic. They are in fact too immature in their passions to be dramatic for very long, and since they are more temperament than flesh, more given to tableaux than action, it is difficult to be concerned with their fates."

== See also ==
- 1986 in literature
- 20th-century French literature
