= Aimée Carter =

American writer of young adult fiction

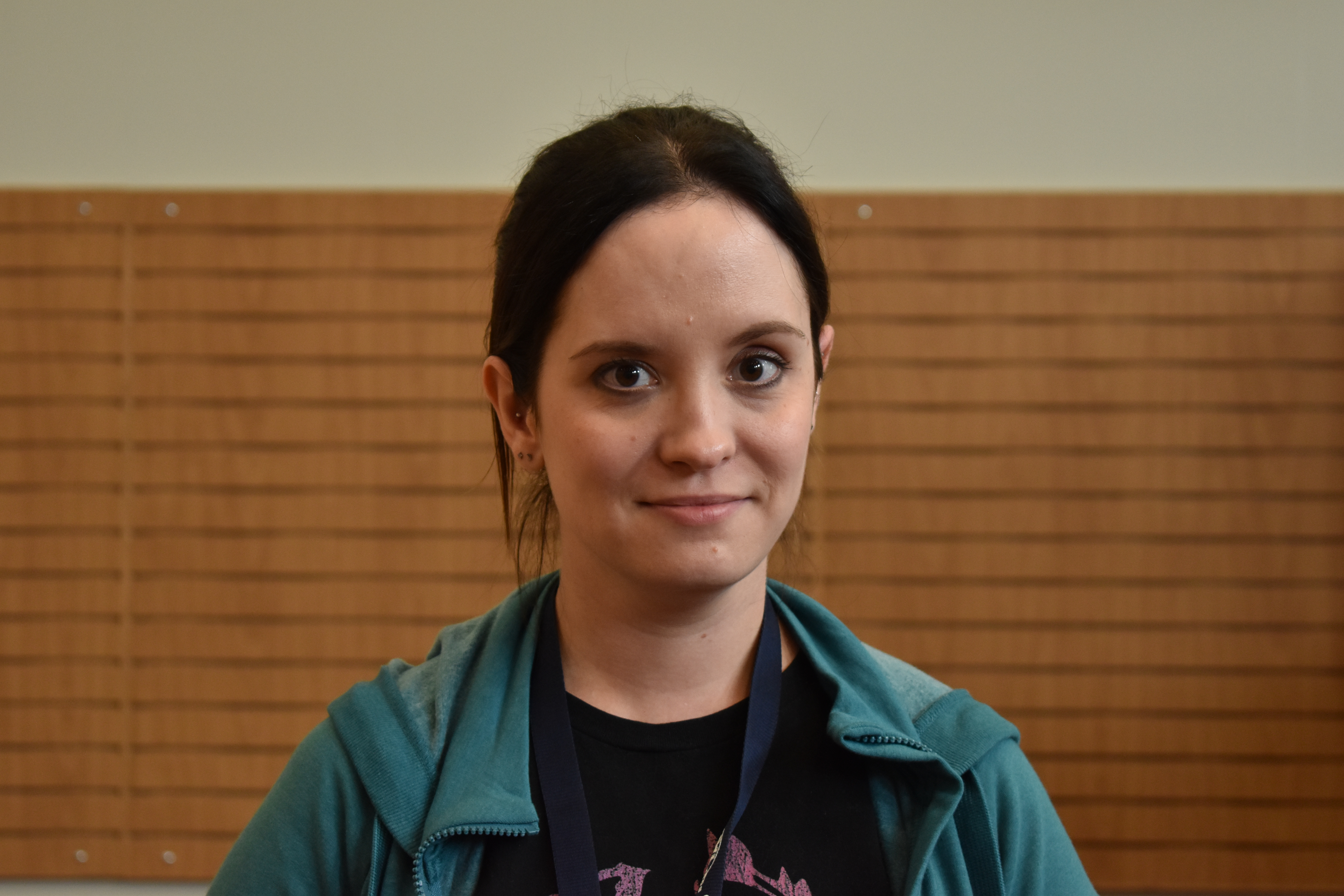
- Carter at the YA Midwest festival on July 26, 2025
- Born: January 24, 1986 (age 40); Detroit, Michigan, U.S.
- Education: University of Michigan
- Occupation: writer
- Writing career
- Genres: children's and young adult fiction

Aimée Carter is an American writer of children's and young adult fiction.

Carter was born on January 24, 1986, in Detroit, Michigan, where she currently resides. She wrote fan fiction before she wrote her first original story. She graduated from the University of Michigan with a degree in Screen Arts and Cultures. She also earned a First Degree black belt in Tae Kwon Do from Progressive Martial Arts.

== Published works ==
=== Middle Grade books ===
==== The Zac Trilogy ====
- Blue Car Nights (originally published as Phoenix Ashes in 2002)
- Words Without Rhyme (November 1, 2004)
- Leaving to Stay (November 1, 2004)

==== Simon Thorn ====
- Simon Thorn and the Wolf's Den (Bloomsbury, February 2, 2016)
  - Animox - Das Heulen der Wölfe, German translation, (Oetinger, August 22, 2016)
- Simon Thorn and the Viper's Pit (Bloomsbury, February 7, 2017)
  - Animox - Das Auge der Schlange, German translation, (Oetinger, March 20, 2017)
- Simon Thorn and the Shark's Cave (Bloomsbury, February 6, 2018)
  - Animox - Die Stadt der Haie, German translation, (Oetinger, October 23, 2017)
- Simon Thorn and the Black Widow’s Web (unpublished)
  - Animox – Der Biss der Schwarzen Witwe, German translation, (Oetinger, July, 2018)
- Simon Thorn and the Eagle’s Lair (unpublished)
  - Animox - Der Flug des Adlers, German translation, (Oetinger, February 25, 2019)
  - Die Erben der Animox, Die Beute des Fuchses
  - Die Erben der Animox, Das Gift des Oktopus

==== Standalone ====
- Curse of the Phoenix (June 8, 2021)
  - Der Fluch des Phönix, German translation (Oetinger, May 9, 2020)

=== Young Adult books ===
==== The Goddess Test ====
- The Goddess Test (2011)
- Goddess Interrupted (2012)
- The Goddess Inheritance (2013)

Novellas

- The Goddess Hunt (2012)
- The Goddess Legacy (2012)
- The Goddess Queen (2012)
- The Lovestruck Goddess (2012)
- Goddess of the Underground (2012)
- God of Thieves (2012)
- God of Darkness (2012)

==== The Blackcoat Rebellion ====
- Pawn (November 26, 2013)
- Captive (November 2014)
- Queen (November 24, 2015)

==== Royal Blood ====
- Royal Blood (March 7, 2023)
- Royal Scandal (March 26, 2024)
- Royal Vengeance (June 16, 2026)
