= The Adventure of Charlie and His Wheat-Straw Hat =

1986 children's book by Berniece T. Hiser

The Adventure of Charlie and His Wheat-Straw Hat: A Memorat
- Front cover
- Author: Berniece T. Hiser
- Illustrator: Mary Szilagyi
- Language: English
- Genre: Children's picture book
- Published: 1986 (Dodd, Mead & Co.)
- Publication place: USA
- Media type: Print (hardback)
- Pages: 40 (unpaginated)
- ISBN: 9780396087724
- OCLC: 12908970

The Adventure of Charlie and His Wheat-Straw Hat: A Memorat is a 1986 children's picture book by Berniece T. Hiser, and illustrated by Mary Szilagyi. Based on a folktale told amongst Hiser's family, it is about a boy, Charlie, who has a hat made for him by his mother and grandmother, and saves his neighbor's farm animals from some rebel soldiers.

== Reception ==
A review in Now and Then of The Adventure of Charlie and His Wheat-Straw Hat wrote "The charm of this book is strengthened by effective use of language ...Vivid illustrations by Mary Szilagyi further enhances the book's appeal.", and the National Council of Teachers of English called it "A fine introduction to an aspect of American history.".

The Adventure of Charlie and His Wheat-Straw Hat has also been reviewed by Kirkus Reviews, and School Library Journal.

It was recommended by The Bulletin of the Center for Children's Books, is a 1986 CCBC Choices book, and a 1987 Notable Children's Trade Book in the Field of Social Studies.
