= Frank Stewart (poet) =

American poet (born 1946)

- Born: 1946 (age 79–80)
- Education: University of Hawaiʻi
- Occupations: Poet; translator
- Writing career
- Notable awards: Whiting Award (1986)

Frank Stewart (born 1946) is an American poet and translator.

== Life ==
A longtime resident of Hawaiʻi, he graduated from the University of Hawaiʻi, where he taught from 1974 to 2017.

He is the editor of Manoa: A Pacific Journal of International Writing.

His poems have appeared in Ironwood, Kyoto Journal, Orion, Ploughshares, Zyzzyva.

He lives in Honolulu, Hawaiʻi.

== Awards ==
- 1986 Whiting Award

== Books ==
- By All Means. El León Literary Arts. 2003. ISBN 978-0-88739-597-0.
- A Natural History of Nature Writing. Island Press. 1994. ISBN 978-1-55963-279-9.
- Flying the Red Eye. Floating Island Publications. December 1986. ISBN 978-0-912449-20-3.
- The Open Water. Floating Island Publications. March 1, 1982. ISBN 978-0-912449-06-7.

=== Anthologies ===
- American War Poetry: An Anthology (Columbia University Press, 2006)
- Honoring Fathers: An International Poetry Anthology (University of the Philippines Press, 2005)
- Father Nature: Fathers as Guides to the Natural World (University of Iowa Press, 2003)
- Place of Passage: Contemporary Catholic Poetry (Story Line Press, 2000)

=== Ploughshares ===
- "Angels of the Mission of the Southern Cross". Ploughshares. Spring 1992. Archived from the original on June 21, 2007.
- "Kamuela". Ploughshares. Spring 1992. Archived from the original on July 21, 2004.
- "'Ama'u". Ploughshares. Spring 1992. Archived from the original on June 21, 2007.
- "Mauna Loa at 7,000 Feet". Ploughshares. Spring 1992. Archived from the original on June 21, 2007.

=== Editor ===
- Frank Stewart; John Eugene Unterecker, eds. (1979). Poetry Hawaii: A Contemporary Anthology. University of Hawaiʻi Press. ISBN 978-0-8248-0642-2.
- Frank Stewart, ed. (2003). Wao Akua: Sacred Source of Life. Hawaiʻi State Department of Land and Natural Resources. ISBN 978-1-8835-2825-6.
