= Downtime (Fox novel) =

1986 novel by Peter Fox

Downtime is a 1986 novel written by Peter Fox.

== Plot summary ==
Downtime is a novel in which science fiction is merged with private eye storytelling. Set in the future year of 2000 AD, it follows Lucius P. Finn, a licensed technological investigator, as he tackles a case of computer crime.

== Reception ==
Wendy Graham reviewed Downtime for Adventurer magazine and stated that "Not much of a thriller. Not good SF. Not much of anything really."

== Reviews ==
- Review by Peter T. Garratt (1988) in Interzone, Spring 1988, (1988)
