= Karlheinz Deschner =

German writer and activist (1924–2014)

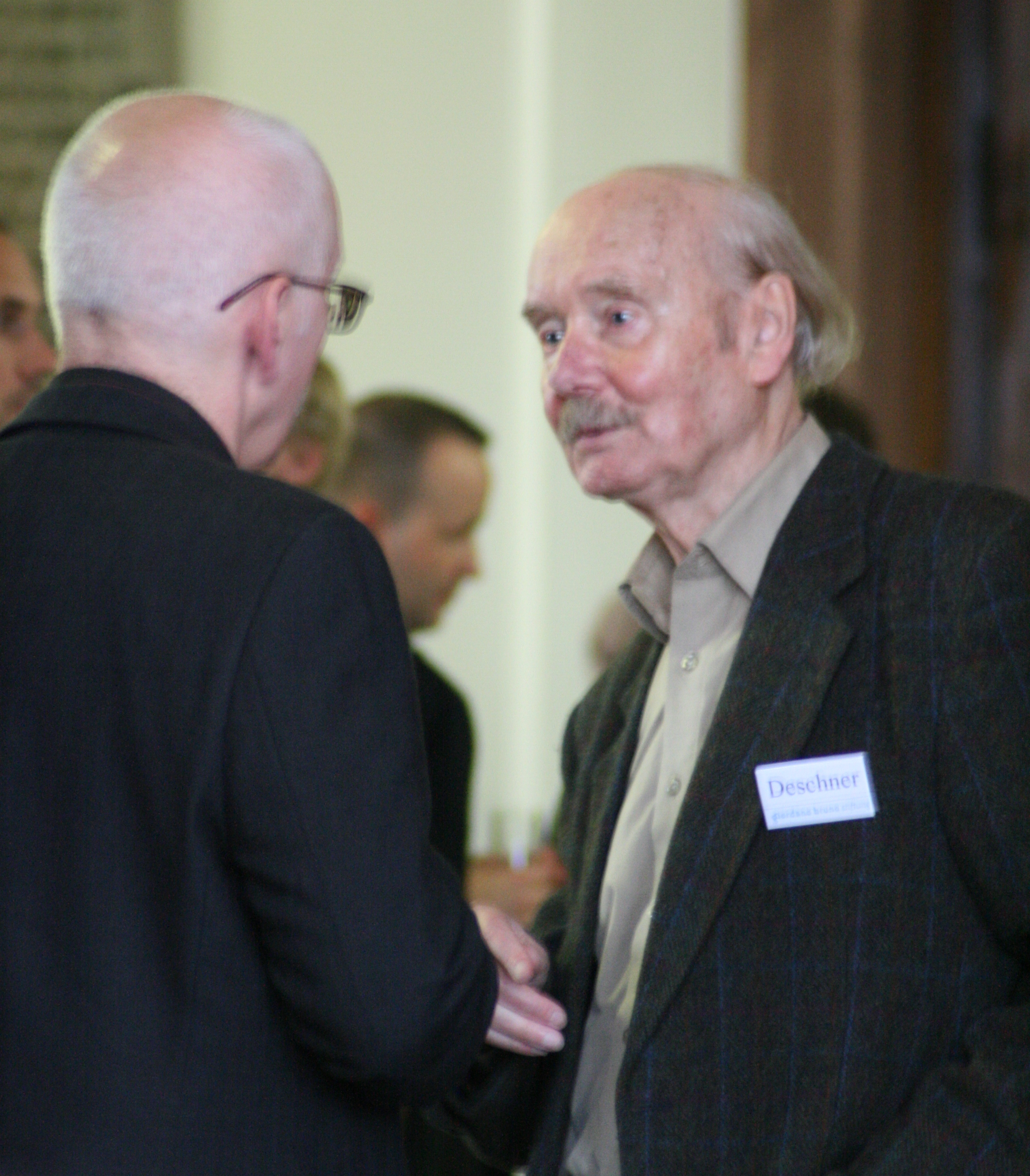
- Karlheinz Deschner (right) in conversation with Hans Albert
- Born: Karl Heinrich Leopold Deschner; 23 May 1924; Bamberg, Weimar Germany
- Died: 8 April 2014 (aged 89); Haßfurt, Germany
- Education: University of Würzburg
- Occupations: Writer; Critic of the church and of religion
- Spouse: Elfi Tuch
- Children: 3

Karl Heinrich Leopold Deschner (23 May 1924 – 8 April 2014) was a German researcher and writer who achieved public attention in Europe for his trenchant and fiercely critical treatment of Christianity in general and the Catholic Church in particular, as expressed in several articles and books, culminating in his 10 volume Christianity's Criminal History (Kriminalgeschichte des Christentums, Rowohlt Verlag, Reinbek).

== Life ==
Deschner's father Karl was a forester in Bamberg, Bavaria. His mother, Margareta Karoline (née Reischböck) grew up in Franconia and Lower Bavaria. Both of them were Catholics, but the mother converted from Protestantism at some point.

Karlheinz, the eldest of three children, attended elementary school in Trossenfurt (close to Bamberg) from 1929 to 1933. Afterwards he attended the Franciscan Seminary in Dettelbach. There he first lived with the family of his godfather and sponsor, the clerical councilor Leopold Baumann, afterward in the Franciscan monastery. From 1934 to 1942 he attended the Alte, Neue and Deutsche Gymnasium as a boarding school student with the Carmelite and English Sisters. In 1942 he passed his final exams. Like the rest of his entire class he reported immediately as a military volunteer for Nazi Germany and was wounded several times. He served as a soldier until the Third Reich's capitulation, in the final stages as a paratrooper.

Initially matriculating as a major in Forestry at the Ludwig-Maximilians-Universität München (LMU Munich), Deschner attended lectures on Law, Theology, Philosophy and Psychology during 1946/47 at the Philosophical-Theological College in Bamberg. From 1947 to 1951 at the University of Würzburg he studied Contemporary German Literature, Philosophy and History and graduated in 1951 with a doctoral dissertation entitled Lenau's Lyrics As an Expression of Metaphysical Despair. In the same year he married Elfi Tuch. They had three children: Katja (1951), Bärbel (1958) and Thomas (1959 to 1984).

From 1924 to 1964, Deschner resided in a former hunting lodge of the prince-bishops of Tretzendorf (Steigerwald), then for two years in the country house of a friend in Fischbrunn (near Hersbruck, Franconian Jura). After that, he resided in Hassfurt am Main until his death.

Karlheinz Deschner published novels, literary criticism, essays, aphorisms, and history critical of religion and the Church. Over the years he gave more than 2,000 public lectures.

In 1971, he was called before court in Nuremberg, charged with "Insults against the Church", but was acquitted. Outside of Germany, his works remained largely unpublished until the eighties, when translated versions (where necessary) were published in Spain, Switzerland, Italy and Poland. (The fourth part of The Cock Crowed Once Again was translated into Norwegian and published in 1972).

Deschner worked on his ambitious Criminal History of Christianity from 1970 to 2013. He had no official research grants, honoraria, stipends, emoluments or official positions, but had been financially supported by a few friends and readers. His friend and patron Alfred Schwarz was able to celebrate the appearance of Volume 1 in September 1986 but did not live to see Volume 2 reach publication. The German entrepreneur Herbert Steffen, founder of the humanistic Giordano Bruno Foundation has continued to support Deschner's work. In 1989 German weekly news magazine Der Spiegel published a review of the first two volumes. The article was written by Horst Herrmann, a former professor of Church law at Münster University who left the Catholic Church in 1981.

During the summer semester of 1987 Deschner taught a course entitled Criminal History of Christianity at the University of Münster.

Karlheinz Deschner was a member of the Yugoslavian Academy of Sciences and Arts in Department of Historical Sciences.

== Prizes ==
In a foreword of his The Criminal History of Christianity an overview of awards and prizes is presented:

Deschner was awarded the Arno Schmidt Prize in 1988, succeeding Wolfgang Koeppen, Hans Wollschläger and Peter Rühmkorf. In June 1993 he followed Walter Jens, Dieter Hildebrandt, Gerhard Zwerenz and Robert Jungk in winning the Alternative Büchner Prize and in July 1993, following Andrei Sakharov and Alexander Dubček, he was the first German to be recognized with the International Humanist Award. In September 2001 he received the secularistic Erwin Fischer Prize, to be followed in November 2001 by the Ludwig Feuerbach Prize.

== Works ==
The first of Deschner's books that has been translated into English is God and the Fascists: the Vatican Alliance with Mussolini, Franco, Hitler, and Pavelic (Amherst, NY: Prometheus Books, 2013).

The following translation of his titles is taken from the English version of his official website.

Novels

- Night Surrounds My House (1956)
- Florence Without Sun (1958)

Critique of religion and the Church

- What Do You Think of Christianity? (1957)
- The Cock Crowed Once Again (1962)
- With God and the Fascists (1965)
- Images of Jesus from a Theological Perspective (1966)
- The Century of Barbarism (1966)
- Church and Fascism (1968)
- Christianity in the View of Its Opponents, Volume 1 (1969)
- Why I Left the Church (1970)
- Church and War (1970)
- The Manipulated Faith (1971)
- Christianity in the View of Its Opponents (1971)
- On the Cross of the Church (1974)
- Church of the Unholy (1974)
- Why I Am a Christian/Atheist/Agnostic (1977)
- A Pope Travels to the Scene of the Crime (1981)
- A Century of Sacred History, Vol. 1 (1982)
- A Century of Sacred History, Vol. 2 (1983)
- The Offended Church (1986)
- Christianity's Criminal History, Vol. 1 (1986)
- Opus Diaboli (1987)
- Christianity's Criminal History, Vol. 2 (1988)
- What I Believe In (1990)
- Christianity's Criminal History, Vol. 3 1990)
- The Politics of the Papacy in the 20th Century (1991)
- The Anti-Catechism (1991)
- God's Representatives (1994)
- Christianity's Criminal History, Vol. 4 (1994)
- World War of the Religions: the Eternal Crusade in the Balkans (1995)
- Christianity's Criminal History, Vol. 5 (1997)
- Nobody on Top (1997)
- Christianity's Criminal History, Vol. 6 (1999)
- Between Subjection and Damnation. Robert Mächler (1999)
- Memento (1999)
- Christianity's Criminal History, Vol. 7 (2002)
- Christianity's Criminal History, Vol. 8 (2004)
- Christianity's Criminal History, Vol. 9 (2008)
- Christianity's Criminal History, Vol. 10 (2013)

Literary criticism

- Kitsch, Convention and Art (1957)
- Talents, Poets, Dilettantes (1964)

Social criticism

- Who Is Teaching in German Universities? (1968)
- The Moloch: A Critical History of the U.S.A. (1992)
- What I Think (1994)
- For a Bite of Meat (1998)

Aphorisms

- Only the Living Swims Against the Current (1985)
- Offences (1994)

Miscellaneous

- Dreams of Sleeping Beauty and Stench from the Stall (1989)
- The Rhoen Region (1998)
