= Jill Eggleton =

New Zealand children's book author

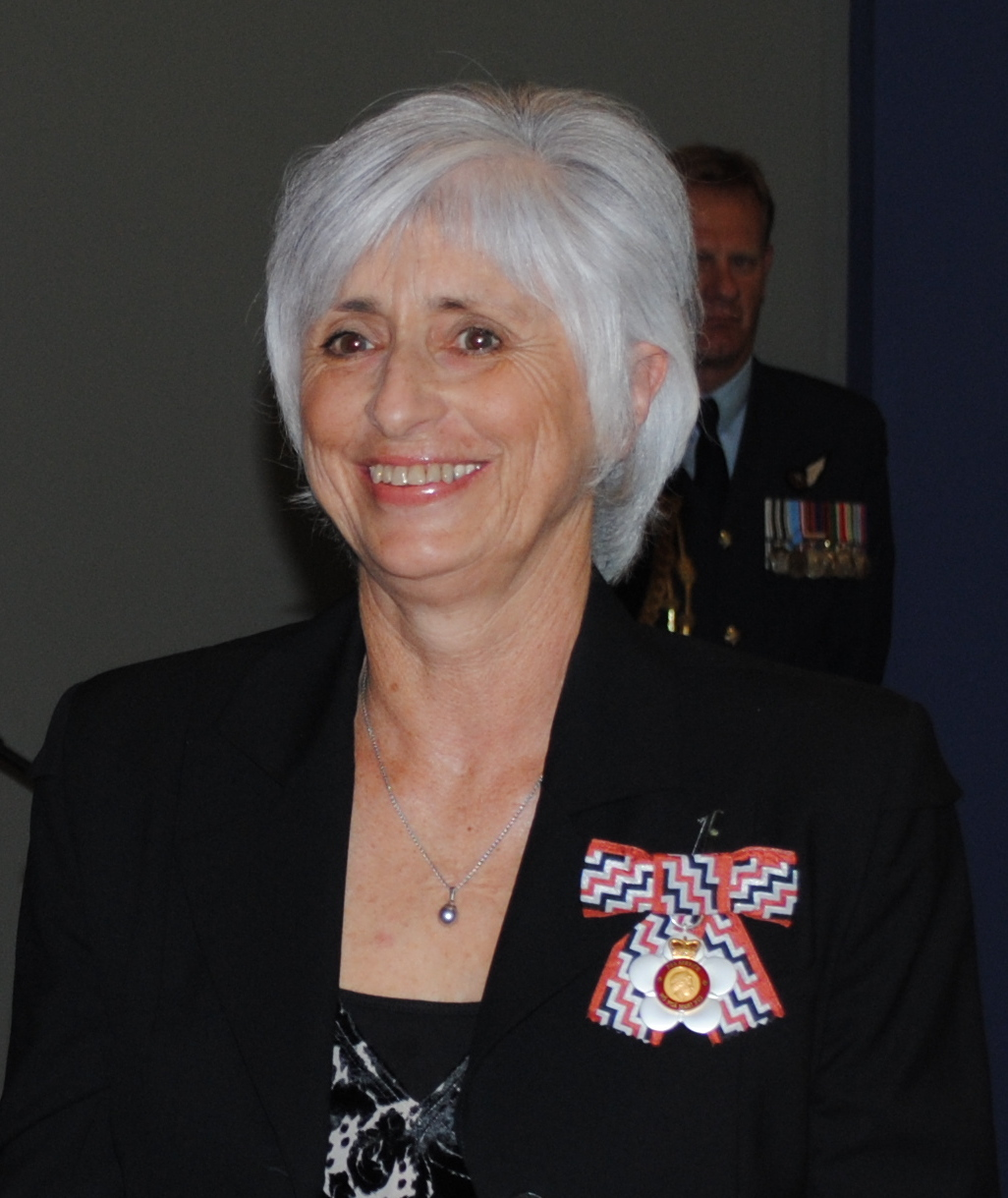
Jill Eggleton in 2010

Jill Ethel Eggleton QSO is a New Zealand children's book author, teacher and education consultant. She received the Margaret Mahy Award in 2015 for Everyone Has A Story. Eggleton has authored over 800 children's books. She was appointed Companion of the Queen's Service Order (QSO) in the 2010 New Year Honours for services to education and literacy.

== Life ==
Eggleton trained as a teacher, before developing a literacy programme which she introduced in schools. Her Key Links series sold over 55 million copies. She has authored over 800 children's books; in 2009 alone she wrote 60 books. Eggleton tries out her books on her five grandchildren. With her husband she founded a publishing company to publish her books. As well as writing fiction and non-fiction books, she also works as an educational consultant.

Eggleton received the Margaret Mahy Award in 2015; her lecture was published as Everyone Has A Story. She was appointed Companion of the Queen's Service Order (QSO) in the 2010 New Year Honours for services to education and literacy. Eggleton lives in Parnell, Auckland.

== Publications ==
Eggleton's many books for children include:

- Mrs Pye's Pool, Sunshine Multimedia (Australia) Pty Ltd, Thomastown, Victoria, 2015
- Big Bubba, Global Education Systems Ltd, Auckland, New Zealand, 2016
- Silly Billy, Global Education Systems Ltd, Auckland, New Zealand, 2015
- A New Bed, Sunshine Multimedia (Australia) Pty Ltd, Thomastown, Victoria, 2015
- Wake UP Cow, Global Education Systems Ltd, Auckland, New Zealand, 2015
