= R. J. Unstead =

British historian and author

Robert John Unstead (21 November 1915 – 5 May 1988) was a British historian and prolific author of history books, most of which were written for young readers.

Unstead went to Dover Grammar School for Boys in Kent, England, from 1926 to 1934 where he was a prefect and house captain, captain of cricket, vice-captain of soccer and in the school rugby union team. He gained Advanced Level passes in History, English, Latin and French. He left school to go to Goldsmiths College where he trained to be a teacher.

His teaching career, begun in 1936, was interrupted by the Second World War when he volunteered for the Royal Air Force and became a physical training instructor. Later he became an operations room controller and joined Combined Operations for the Normandy landings before service in Greece, Italy and France.

After the war, Unstead resumed his teaching career and later became headmaster of The Grange Primary School, Letchworth Garden City, Hertfordshire. He began to develop ideas for writing history books with pictures that would appeal to the young. He wrote and edited over 40 books, some of which sold in their millions. He visited Australia and collaborated on five books on Australian history. Whilst in the United States, Unstead was invited to the White House following his Story of Britain being chosen by the Library of Congress as one of the 'best books of the year'.

He was married to Florence and they had three daughters together. He was chairman of local school governors and had interests in golf, gardening and cricket.

He died at Ipswich Hospital from heart failure on 5 May 1988 and his funeral service was held on 11 May in the Parish Church of St Andrew, Aldringham, Suffolk.

== Bibliography ==
- —— (1955). Looking at history: From Cavemen to Present Day. A & C Black Ltd.
- —— (1959). People in History. A & C Black.
- —— (1962). The Medieval scene, 787-1485.; illustrated by Stanley Herbert
- —— (1962). Crown and Parliament, 1485-1688.; illustrated by Stanley Herbert
- ——. The Rise of Great Britain 1688-1837. A & C Black Ltd.
- —— (1964). A century of change, 1837-today.
- —— (1966). Britain in the 20th Century. A & C Black Ltd.
- —— (1966). From Caractacus to Alfred. A & C Black Ltd.
- —— (1971). Some Kings and Queens. Corgi Childrens.
- —— (1971). The story of Britain:Stuart and Tudor Times. Corgi Childrens.
- —— (1971). The story of Britain:In the Middle Ages. Corgi Childrens.
- —— (1971). History of the English Speaking World: Kings, Barons and Serfs, 1086-1300 Bk. 2. Prentice Hall & IBD.
- —— (1974). Age of Machines: A pictorial History 1815 - 1901. Macdonald Phoebus.
- —— (1980). The Assyrians. Ward Lock Ltd.
- —— (1984). A history of the world.
- ——. Years of the sword : a pictorial history : 1300 - 1485.
- ——. World War One : an illustrated history in colour 1914-1918.
- ——. Travel by road : through the ages.
- ——. The twenties : an illustrated history in colour, 1919-1929.
- ——. The thirties; an illustrated history in colour 1930-1939.
- —— (1973). The Twenties. MacDonald.
- —— (1974). The Thirties. MacDonald Phoebus.
- ——. The 1940s.
- ——. Struggle for power : a pictorial history : 1485 - 1689.
