= The Type One Super Robot =

- The book cover, depicting Uncle Bellamy, Humbert and Manders.
- Author: Alison Prince
- Illustrator: Alison Prince
- Language: English
- Publisher: André Deutsch Ltd
- Publication date: 1986
- Publication place: United Kingdom
- ISBN: 0-233-97953-0

The Type One Super Robot is a 1986 children's book written and illustrated by the British author Alison Prince.

== Reception ==
In Britain, the book was successful and went through several editions, for instance, as a Puffin book. It has been variously recommended for the 5–8 age group, and for the ages of eight and up.

In the United States, a Kirkus reviewer described it as "a gentle British farce" and said the "comic antics" of the boy protagonist and the robot "should keep readers chuckling." A Los Angeles librarian reviewing the book in the 1988 School Library Journal was less enthusiastic, saying the humour of this "limp addition to the robot pal oeuvre" was "forced and often dependent on knowledge of British terms."

== Synopsis ==
A boy, Humbert, goes to stay with his Uncle Bellamy. Once there he discovers a strange package that appears to hum to itself. Upon alerting his uncle to the package, Humbert is surprised to find that it contains a Type One Household Robot, designed to help around the home. The robot is swiftly named Manders by Uncle Bellamy, because he does everything that a man-does.

Humbert and Manders get into many adventures, the most memorable of which is a kite-flying expedition.

One joy in the story for children is to read how Manders struggles to come to terms with human existence, for example by misunderstanding phrases like "getting along like a house on fire," failing to realise that a kite is not meant to take you with it, or trying to slice custard.
