= Hiser, West Virginia =

- Unincorporated community
- Location within West Virginia Location within the United States
- Coordinates: 38°57′45″N 79°6′55″W
- Country: United States
- State: West Virginia
- County: Grant
- Elevation: 958 ft (292 m)
- Time zone: UTC-5 (Eastern (EST))
  - Summer (DST): UTC-4 (EDT)
- GNIS feature ID: 1557010

Hiser was an unincorporated community in Grant County, West Virginia, United States. Its post office is closed.
