= Michel Host =

French writer (1942–2021)

Michel Host (1942 – 6 June 2021) was a French writer.

== Biography ==
He was born in Veurne, West Flanders, Belgium. He taught school, then high school. He lived in Paris, where he taught language and literature of the Spanish Golden Age in CNED (1996) after Hispanic studies at the Sorbonne.

He was a columnist for the literary journal Revue des deux mondes and Regards. Co-founder of the magazine L’Art du bref in 1995, he received the Prix Goncourt in 1986 for his second novel, Valet de nuit (Grasset).

Host died on 6 June 2021, from COVID-19 in Paris during the COVID-19 pandemic in France.

== Awards ==
- 2003 Grand Prize of the news of the S.G.D.L.
- 1996 Book Prize in Picardy
- 1986 Prix Goncourt

== Bibliography ==
- L'Ombre, le Fleuve, l'Eté, 1983, Éditions Grasset, prix Robert Walser 1984 (Bienne, Suisse) pour la première fois décerné à un romancier français.
- Valet de nuit, 1986, Éditions Grasset, prix Goncourt
- Les Cercles d'or, 1989, Éditions Grasset
- La Maison Traum, 1990, Éditions Grasset
- Peter Sis, l'imagier du temps, 1996, Éditions Grasset
- La Soirée, 1989 (épuisé), réédition de poche, Ed. Mille & Une Nuits, 2002, Éditions Maren Sell
- Images de l'Empire, 1991 Éditions Ramsay / De Cortanze, réédition 2001, Ed. Olympio, on line
- Forêt Forteresse, conte pour aujourd'hui, 1993, Édition La Différence
- with A. Absire, J-C. Bologne, D. Noguez, C. Pujade-Renaud, M. Winckler, D. Zimmermann : L'Affaire Grimaudi, roman, 1995, Éditions du Rocher
- Les attentions de l'enfance, 1996, Éditions Bernard Dumerchez, prix de Picardie
- Déterrages/villes, poèmes, 1997, Éditions Bernard Dumerchez
- Journal de vacances d'une chatte parisienne, 1996, Éditions La Goutte d'Eau
- Roxane, 1997, Éditions Zulma-Calmann-Lévy
- Graines de pages, proses & poèmes sur 60 photos de Claire Garate, 1999, Éditions Eboris, Genève
- Alentours, petites proses, 2001, Éditions de l'Escampette
- Regards, album, 1999, Éditions Blanc-Mesnil 2000
- Poème d'Hiroshima, oratorio, Éditions Rhubarbe, 2005
- Le petit chat de neige, Éditions Rhubarbe, 2007
