= Alison Prince =

British children's writer (1931–2019)

- Born: 26 March 1931; Beckenham, Kent, England
- Died: 30 October 2019 (aged 88); Isle of Arran, Scotland
- Education: Slade School of Art; Goldsmiths College
- Occupations: author, screenwriter, biographer
- Writing career
- Genre: children's literature
- Notable work: screenwriter for children's television series Trumpton
- Notable awards: Guardian Children's Fiction Prize (1996)

Alison Prince (26 March 1931 – 12 October 2019) was a British children's writer, screenwriter and biographer, who settled on the Isle of Arran in Scotland. Her novels for young people won several awards. She was the scriptwriter of the much repeated children's television series Trumpton.

== Background ==
Prince was born on 26 March 1931 in Beckenham, Kent (now in Greater London) to Louise (née David) and Charles Prince. Her mother trained as a nurse and was later Mayor of Bromley while her father was manager of the Yorkshire Bank in London. She grew up in South London and attended a girls' grammar school where she enjoyed grammar and Latin, but not maths. Her parents were from Scotland and Yorkshire. Her father was a keen pianist, and she played the clarinet. As a child she visited Scottish relatives in Glasgow.

After completing a degree course at the Slade School of Art, where she had won a scholarship, Prince found work in casual, low-paid jobs unrelated to art. She later took a postgraduate teaching diploma at Goldsmiths College, then taught art at the Elliott Comprehensive School, in Putney. She married a fellow teacher, Goronwy Parry, and together they had three children. With this interruption to her teaching career, she turned instead to occasional journalism. After the marriage ended, she ran a small farm in Suffolk for eight years.

== From television to books ==
Prince later moved into writing for children's television, gaining notice with her scripts for the stop motion animated puppet series Trumpton (1967) for young children produced by Gordon Murray. Prince also wrote the lyrics for the songs performed by Brian Cant. "I didn’t have a television, but I had three kids to feed, so I said yes," she recalled in 2006.

Her first book was Joe and a Horse and other stories about Joe from 'Watch with Mother', with Joan Hickson, a 1968 spin-off from the BBC pre-school program Watch with Mother. (Note: Prince was scriptwriter for the Watch with Mother "Joe" subseries in autumn 1966 and spring 1971. Joan Hickson (not the actress) was production designer for "Joe".) In the late 1970s, she turned to writing books for children, some based on historical characters. They include My Royal Story about Catherine of Aragon, which was re-released in 2010. How's Business (1987), set in World War II, made the shortlist for the Nestle Smarties Book Prize.

The Sherwood Hero (1995) is a modern-day Robin Hood story for young adults, about a girl stealing a credit card from her father's client, drawing £100, attempting to hand it out to the poor in the streets of Glasgow, and then coping with the guilt. For this Prince was a joint winner (with Philip Pullman) of the Guardian Children's Fiction Prize, a once-in-a-lifetime book award judged by a panel of British children's writers. Her thriller Oranges and Murder was the Scottish Arts Council Children's Book of the Year in 2002. Translations of her books have been published in several languages, including Danish, German, Japanese and Welsh.

Mainly for adults, Prince wrote well-received biographies of Kenneth Grahame (1994, reissued 2009) and Hans Christian Andersen (1998), a collection of essays on formative thinking, two booklets of poetry, and two volumes of pieces that had originally appeared in a local Arran newspaper.

In 2005, Prince received an honorary doctorate of letters from the University of Leicester for services to children's books.

Forbidden Soldier, a children's book about the second phase of the English Civil War, appeared in 2014, as did The Lost King: Richard III and the Princes in the Tower, a biography of Richard III.

== Death ==
Alison Prince died on 12 October 2019, aged 88, having been ill for a number of years, which involved undergoing major heart surgery.

== Selected works ==
These titles are or have recently been available in the UK, according to the websites of major internet booksellers:

- Forbidden Soldier (2014)*
- The Lost King (2014)*
- No Ordinary Love Song (2011)*
- Henry VIII's Wives (2011)*
- Catherine of Aragon (2010)*
- Web (2010)*
- Elizabeth (2010)*
- Tudor Stories for Girls (2009)*
- The Sherwood Nightmare (2008)
- Outbreak (2008)*
- Help (2008)*
- Princes in the Tower (2008)*
- Speed (2006)
- Jacoby's Game (2006)*
- Doodlebug Summer (2006)*
- Smoke (2005)
- Tower-Block Pony (2004)
- The Summerhouse (2004)
- Luck (2004)*
- Anne Boleyn and Me: the diary of Elinor Valjean, London 1525–1536 (2004)*
- Three Blind Eyes (2003)*
- The Whifflet Train (2003)
- Spud (2003)
- Turnaround (2002)*
- Oranges and Murder (2002)
- Dora Saves the Prince (2002)
- Boojer (2002)
- The Fortune Teller (2001)
- My Tudor Queen (2001)*
- Bumble (2001)
- Bird Boy (2001)*
- Dear Del (2001)*
- Second Chance (2000)*
- Acts of Union (2000)
- A Nation Again (2000)
- A Biker's Ghost (2000)
- The Biggish Ewe (1999)
- Dear Del (1999)
- Cat Number Three (1999)*
- Hans Christian Andersen: the fan dancer (1998)*
- Magic Dad (1997)
- Fergus, Fabulous Ferret (1997)
- Fatso's Rat (1997)
- The Witching Tree (1996)
- The Sherwood Hero (1995)
- On Arran (1994)
- Kenneth Grahame: an innocent in the Wild Wood (1994)*
- Having Been in the City (1994)*
- A Dog Called You (1993)
- A Book of Arran Poetry (edited with Cicely Gill, 1993)
- The Necessary Goat (1992)
- Blue Moon and other stories (1988)
- A Haunting Refrain (1988)
- How's Business? (1987)
- The Type One Super Robot (1986)
- The Others (1986)
- Nick's October (1986)
- A Job for Merv (1986)
- Rock On, Mill Green (1985)
- Scramble! (1984)
- Night Landings (illustrated by Edward Mortelmans, 1983)
- A Spy at Mill Green (1983)
- The Sinister Airfield (illus. Edward Mortelmans, 1982)
- Mill Green on Stage (1982)
- Mill Green on Fire (1982)
- Haunted Children (1982)
- Who Wants Pets? (1980)
- The Turkey's Nest (1979)
- The Night I Sold My Boots (1979)
- Friend in Need (1977)
- Whosaurus? Dinosaurus, with Joan Hickson (1975)
- The Doubting Kind (1975)
- Joe and the Nursery School, with Joan Hickson (1972)
- Joe Moves House, with Joan Hickson (1972)
- The Joe Annual, with Joan Hickson (1971)
- The Red Alfa (1971)
- The House on the Common (1969)
- Joe and a Horse and other stories about Joe from 'Watch with Mother', with Joan Hickson (BBC, 1968)
