= Kriminalgeschichte des Christentums =

Series of writings by Karlheinz Deschner

Kriminalgeschichte des Christentums (In English Criminal History of Christianity) is the main work of the author and church critic Karlheinz Deschner. It describes the misconduct attributed to various Christian churches, denominations, sects, and leagues, as well as its representatives and Christian sovereigns during Christian history. The work covers the entire history of Christianity from its biblical beginnings until the present. It was published in ten volumes beginning in 1986, with the final volume appearing in March 2013.

Partial or complete translations of this work have been published in Italian, Spanish, Greek, Polish, Russian and English.

== Summary ==
In the introduction to the complete works, which is the beginning of the first volume, Deschner explains his intention by starting with what is not to be found in his work: an answer to the question "What is Christianity good for?". According to the sentence Audiatur et altera pars ("one should listen to the other side, too") he wants to counterbalance the gigantic ascendence of the existing glorification of Christianity. Also, he does not want to write about the alleged or - exceptionally - really positive effects of Christianity. Instead, he wants to demonstrate that the advocates of a primary moral instance not only partially but permanently failed their own ideals.

Deschner anticipates the main criticism at his work, namely the one-sidedness of selection of facts, and responds with a clear counter. His aim was not a history of churches, but an illustration of all (including non-church) phenomena of Christianity. These would be measured up to not only generic terms, like crime or humanity, but also to the central ethical ideas of the synoptics, as well as to the Christian self-conception as the religion of glad tidings, love, peace, etc., and also the ignored demands of the later church, like prohibition of military service (first for all Christians, then for the clergy, only), ban on simony, interest-taking, usury and many more.

== List of volumes with abstracts ==
In the following, all volumes are listed with an abstract for each of them. The English titles were taken from the author's English web-site where available. Where not available, they are marked as (translation).

=== Vol. 1: Die Frühzeit (The Early Period) ===
- Deschner, Karlheinz (1986). Kriminalgeschichte des Christentums, Bd.1, Die Frühzeit. Von den Ursprüngen im Alten Testament bis zum Tod des heiligen Augustinus (430). Reinbek bei Hamburg: Rowohlt. ISBN 3-498-01263-0.
- English title: Christianity's Criminal History. Volume 1. The Early Period. From Old Testament origins to the death of Saint Augustine (430).

This first volume was published after 16 years of preparatory work. It illustrates the genesis of Christianity and its ascension to the Roman state religion.

It starts with a look into the Old Testament. Deschner describes the land seizure of the Israelites after the crumbling Egyptian power in Palestine in the 14th and 13th century B.C.E. and the destruction of the Canaan city-state system. This beginning, which does not directly concern Christianity, but ancient Judaism, demonstrates the relation between religious rhetoric and violent political reality: This is where Deschner sees the origin of a tradition of holy wars, following which Christians later commit numerous mass murders in the name of Israel's God, too. He describes the many death penalties the Torah stipulates for religious offences, King David's policy of conquest, the ruling and corruption of the priests, and finally the decline of the state of Israel in Roman times.

Only this decline made the ascension of Christianity in the Roman empire possible, because Christians could see themselves as the true Israel of God. Christian Anti-Judaism begins with the New Testament (see Antisemitism and the New Testament) and continues with the Church being interpreted as new Israel. Based on selected quotations, Deschner demonstrates the antisemitism of the Doctors of the Church Ephrem, John Chrysostom, Jerome and Hilary of Poitiers.

Likewise, the Church Fathers - according to Deschner - agitated against heretics and misbelievers. Deschner defends only Origen, whom he numbers among the most noble Christians at all. One whole chapter is dedicated to the attacks against paganism. He then analyses the persecution of Christians in the mirror of partially exaggerating martyr legends from Christian historiography as well as the retrospective Christian view of pagan emperors. Furthermore, Deschner looks at the first significant adversaries of Christianity, Celsus and Porphyrios.

According to Deschner, emperor Constantine I turned "the church of pacifists into a church of battlefield-shavelings". In Deschner's eyes, giving up the central pacifist values of pre-Constantine Christianity means "a bankruptcy of Jesus' teachings". Furthermore, Deschner describes Constantine's actions in the battle against Jews, "heretics" and Pagans. He also does not spare the kingdom of Armenia, the first state in the world to make Christianity a state religion (in 301), by asserting that "this immediately began with massive persecution of Pagans".

About emperor Julian Deschner writes that he "towers over his Christian antecessors in all aspects: in character, ethical and intellectual.". Julian's attempt to re-legitimate Pagan religions is commented as follows:

Vielleicht, wer weiß, wäre eine nichtchristliche Welt in genauso viele Kriege gestürzt – obwohl die nichtchristliche Welt seit siebzehn Jahrhunderten weniger Kriege führt als die christliche! Schwer vorstellbar aber in einer heidnischen Welt: die ganze Heuchelei der christlichen. Und noch schwerer denkbar deren religiöse Intoleranz.

— Kriminalgeschichte Bd. 1, S. 317 und passim

English translation: Maybe, who knows, a non-Christian world would have tumbled into as many wars – though, during the last 17 centuries, the non-Christian world fought fewer wars than the Christian! But it is very hard to imagine in a Pagan world: all the hypocrisy of the Christians. And even less thinkable is their religious intolerance.

The volume closes with an evaluation of the Church Fathers Athanasius, Ambrose and Augustine. Deschner accuses Athanasius of "unscrupulousness" as well as "striving for prestige and power". Ambrose is in Deschner's words a "fanatic antisemite". Thanks to his church policies, "adamant and intolerant, but not so direct; versed, smoother", he set an "example for the Church until today" (page 400 and passim). And finally, Augustine, who positioned "patriotism above the love of a father for his son" (page 520) and sanctioned "just war" as well as "holy war".

=== Vol. 2: Die Spätantike (Late Antiquity) ===
- Deschner, Karlheinz (1989). Kriminalgeschichte des Christentums, Bd.2, Die Spätantike. Rowohlt, Reinbek. ISBN 3-498-01277-0.
- English title: Christianity's Criminal History. Volume 2. Late Antiquity. From the Catholic "children emperors" to the extermination of the Arian Vandals and Ostrogoths under Justinian I (527-565).

Deschner writes, the "conditions as in ancient Rome" (German "Zustände wie im alten Rom" is a proverb meaning decadent, chaotic, irresponsible, violent etc. - a civilisation in decline) were characteristic for the conditions of the Roman Church. The atrocities committed by Christian leaders in late antiquity are mostly euphemised and concealed by Church-historians until today.

=== Vol. 3: Die Alte Kirche (The Ancient Church) ===
- Deschner, Karlheinz (1990). Kriminalgeschichte des Christentums, Bd.3, Die Alte Kirche. Rowohlt, Reinbek. ISBN 3-498-01285-1.
- English title: Christianity's Criminal History. Volume 3. The Ancient Church. Forgery, Brainwashing, Exploitation, Annihilation.

Unlike the other volumes, which used a chronological approach, Deschner organised this volume according to so-called crime key aspects, which he identifies in the following areas:

- The Christian forgery
- The miracle and relic cheating
- The pilgrimage economy
- The brainwashing, dumbing down and ruin of the ancient education
- The Christian book burning and the annihilation of Paganism
- The preservation, stabilisation and expansion of slavery
- The double-tongued social doctrine and the actual social policy of the main Church

=== Vol. 4: Frühmittelalter (Early Middle Ages) ===
- Deschner, Karlheinz (1994). Kriminalgeschichte des Christentums, Bd.4, Frühmittelalter. Rowohlt, Reinbek. ISBN 3-498-01300-9.
- English title: Christianity's Criminal History. Volume 4. Early Middle Ages. From King Clovis (ca. 500) to the death of Charles "the Great" (814).

In the early Middle Ages, the split-off from Byzantium happened, the war against the Islam began and the popes in Rome became powerful rulers. Deschner considers pope Gregor I as a man of double morale, who consistently called to repentance and preached the close apocalypse, but himself pursued the extension of his power at any cost, recommending dungeon, torture, hostage-taking and pillaging, and also knew using bribery well. Deschner calls the Donation of Constantine "the biggest forgery of documents in world history". In the end of the volume, Charlemagne is accused of opportunistic relations to the popes, as well as blamed for his excessively bloody "sword mission" with the Saxons and his annihilation of the kingdoms of the Lombards and of the Avars.

=== Vol. 5: 9. und 10. Jahrhundert (9th and 10th Centuries) ===
- Deschner, Karlheinz (1997). Kriminalgeschichte des Christentums, Bd.5, 9. und 10. Jahrhundert. Rowohlt, Reinbek. ISBN 3-498-01304-1.
- English title: Christianity's Criminal History. Volume 5. 9th and 10th Centuries. From Louis the Pious (814) to the death of Otto III (1002).

Before the volume's actual beginning, a reply to the anthology Criminalisation of Christianity? and an editorial written by Hermann Gieselbusch (lector with Rowohlt publishing house) has been put.

In the then following description of the 9th and 10th century, Deschner illustrates the deep entanglement of secular and church power. Clerical principalities came into existence and the military service of the high clergy prospered. Under the Ottonian dynasty, the Church in the Holy Roman Empire was completely militarised; dioceses and abbeys controlled a major military potential. Even popes entered wars: Leo IV in the naval Battle of Ostia (849) and John X in the Battle of Garigliano (915). Popes excommunicated each other, some were thrown in prison, strangled, mutilated, poisoned. Sergius III had even two other popes murdered. Chapter 3 discusses the Pseudo-Isidorian Decretals, which are the most important forgery in Carolingian times (Dawson).

=== Vol. 6: Das 11. und 12. Jahrhundert (11th and 12th Centuries) ===
- Deschner, Karlheinz (1999). Kriminalgeschichte des Christentums, Bd.6, Das 11. und 12. Jahrhundert. Rowohlt, Reinbek. ISBN 3-498-01309-2.
- English title: Christianity's Criminal History. Volume 6. 11th and 12th Centuries. From Emperor Henry II "the Holy" (1002) to the end of the Third Crusade (1192).

This volume covers emperor Henry II the Holy, who, in alliance with Pagans, fought three wars against Catholic Poland, the momentous pontificate of Gregory VII, an "aggressive Satan", who led the Holy See to victory over the emperor's throne in the Investiture Controversy (Canossa), the East-West Schism, the First Crusade with the massacre of Jerusalem's inhabitants as well as the Second and Third Crusade.

=== Vol. 7: Das 13. und 14. Jahrhundert (13th and 14th Centuries) ===
- Deschner, Karlheinz (2002). Kriminalgeschichte des Christentums, Bd.7, Das 13. und 14. Jahrhundert. Rowohlt, Reinbek. ISBN 3-498-01320-3.
- English title: Christianity's Criminal History. Volume 7. 13th and 14th Centuries. From Emperor Henry VI (1190) to the death of Louis IV of Bavaria (1347).

Deschner writes about the Staufer-emperor Henry VI, who aimed for global dominance even without papal blessing, and about the most powerful pope of history, Innocent III. During the time covered by this volume, crusades to all directions happened, including the Fourth Crusade, the crusade of Frederick II, the crusades of Louis IX to Egypt and Tunis, the grotesque Children's Crusade, the crusades of Christians against Christians, the Sicilian Vespers, the extermination of the Templars, the annihilation of the Pagans in the northeast, the Christian murders of Jews and last but not least the totalitarian Inquisition, which aimed for the repression of any liberal mind.

=== Vol. 8: Das 15. und 16. Jahrhundert (The 15th and 16th century) ===
- Deschner, Karlheinz (2004). Kriminalgeschichte des Christentums, Bd.8, Das 15. und 16. Jahrhundert. Vom Exil der Päpste in Avignon bis zum Augsburger Religionsfrieden. Rowohlt Verlag GmbH. ISBN 3-498-01323-8.
- English title (translation): Christianity's Criminal History. Volume 8. The 15th and 16th century. From the exile of the popes in Avignon till the Peace Of Augsburg.

Deschner describes the beginning witch-hunt, the Western Schism, the Renaissance popes, the fight against intra-Christian opposition (Wycliffe, Hus and the Council of Constance, Luther and the German Peasants' War).

=== Vol. 9: Mitte des 16. bis Anfang des 18. Jahrhunderts (Middle of 16th century till beginning of 18th century) ===
- Deschner, Karlheinz (2008). Kriminalgeschichte des Christentums, Bd.9, Mitte des 16. bis Anfang des 18. Jahrhunderts. Vom Völkermord in der Neuen Welt bis zum Beginn der Aufklärung. Rowohlt Verlag GmbH. ISBN 978-3-498-01327-1.
- English title (translation): Christianity's Criminal History. Volume 9. Middle of 16th century till beginning of 18th century. From genocide in the New World till the beginning of the Enlightenment.

Volume 9 covers the following topics:

- The "American Holocaust"; the genocide in connection with the conquest and the Christianization of the American continent.
- The reformation in Switzerland; Zwingli and Calvin
- The Counter-Reformation
- Ignatius of Loyola
- The Confessionalization
- Society of Jesus; here, Deschner focuses on the religious order's influence on the political rulers of their time.
- Events, political players and their interests as well as their combination in the forefront of the Thiry Years' War.
- The Thirty Years' War. The ostensibly religiously motivated events are analysed in the context of the European nobility's worldly oriented ambition for power and conquest.
- The war continued; the misery of the Pax Christiana; the time after the Thirty Years' War.

=== Vol. 10: 18. Jahrhundert und Ausblick auf die Folgezeit (18th century and outlook onto the aftermath) ===
- Deschner, Karlheinz (2013). Kriminalgeschichte des Christentums, Bd.10, 18. Jahrhundert und Ausblick auf die Folgezeit. Könige von Gottes Gnaden und Niedergang des Papsttums. Rowohlt Verlag GmbH. ISBN 978-3498013318.
- English title (translation): Christianity's Criminal History. Volume 10. 18th century and outlook onto the aftermath. Kings by grace of God and decline of papacy.

More than a quarter century after the first volume's publication, Deschner completed this work: The 10th and last volume of the Criminal History was published in March 2013. This volume covers:

- The decline of papacy.
- The gradual separation of church and state.

== Reception ==
The reactions to this book series have been mixed. While some praised Deschner's writings as a contribution to the Enlightenment as important as the works of Pierre Bayle, Claude Helvétius, Voltaire and Heinrich Heine, others condemned his Christianity's Criminal History as "criminalisation of Christianity".

Horst Herrmann, from 1970 til 1975 professor of church law at the Catholic theological faculty of Münster University, who left the Catholic church in 1981, praised Deschner in 1989 in an article in Der Spiegel as a moralist asking the question:

Wie viele Ermordete müssen denn noch her, bis Reue einsetzt und Abkehr? Wieviel muß aufgedeckt sein, bis Komplizenschaft sich nicht mehr lohnt? Bis es als Schande gilt, sich als Christ zu bekennen? Bis die Täter nicht mehr die Beleidigten spielen dürfen?

English translation: How many more need to be murdered until remorse and renunciation will finally begin? How much more needs to be exposed, until complicity won't be worth it anymore? Until confessing to Christianity is considered to be a shame? Until the wrongdoers are not allowed to act offended anymore?

A three-day symposium organized by Hans Reinhard Seeliger in the Catholic Academy in Schwerte was dedicated to the first three volumes in the beginning of October 1992. Besides Seeliger, 22 other specialists in Christian history, patrology, old history, archaeology, jurisprudence, and other fields participated. The symposium's papers were published in 1993 as an anthology. Deschner refused the invitation arguing that he already answered all basic questions sufficiently in the preface of his first volume. He decided to exemplarily confront the paper Emperor Konstantin, one of the Greats in history? in a reply which was put in front of the fifth volume. The other papers were skipped. Hermann Gieselbusch, lector with the Rowohlt publishing house, noted at the same place (preface of vol. 5), that only few symposium participants "abstained at least from personal revilement", mentioning four speakers by name - Ulrich Faust, Theofried Baumeister, Erich Feldmann und Gert Haendler - and thanking them for their fairness in Deschner's name.

When Deschner's Criminal History (volumes 1 to 8) was published digitally as CD ROM in 2005, Giesbert Damaschke wrote in his recension:

Wenn hierzulande das Stichwort "Kirchenkritik" fällt, dann kann man sicher sein, dass es [...] fast ausschließlich um das Werk eines einzelnen Mannes geht: Um Karlheinz Deschner [...]. So umfassend und omnipräsent ist sein Schaffen, [...] dass anderes daneben nur wie eine fade Wiederholung wirkt.

English translation: Whenever the key word "criticism of the Church" is mentioned in this country [Germany], you can be sure that the discussion is [...] nearly exclusively about the work of one single man: Karlheinz Deschner [...]. His works are so comprehensive and omnipresent [...] that everything else looks like a bland repetition when compared to Deschner's works.

In 2008, after the publication of volume 9, Arno Widmann wrote in the Frankfurter Rundschau, "Kette der Grausamkeiten" ("Chain of atrocities"):

Es gibt Sätze in diesem Buch, die möchte man auswendig lernen, um niemals zu vergessen, welches die Grundlagen der Welt sind, in der wir leben. Zum Beispiel dieser: "Lebten um 1650 in ganz Spanisch-Amerika noch etwa 4 Millionen Indianer, waren es um 1492, so die Schätzungen, 7 bis 100 Millionen, wobei 35 Millionen als plausibel gelten."

English translation: There are sentences in this book which you want to learn by heart to make sure you never forget what are the fundamentals of the world we live in. For example this: "While around 1650 there were about 4 million Native Americans left alive in whole Spanish-America, there were - according to estimations - between 7 and 100 million living there in 1492, at which the number 35 million is generally accepted."
