= Berniece T. Hiser =

American writer and schoolteacher

- Born: April 6, 1908; Cow Creek, Kentucky, U.S.
- Died: January 5, 1995 (aged 86)
- Education: Berea College; University of Kentucky
- Occupations: Writer, schoolteacher
- Spouse: Ora Hiser
- Parent: Wilson Edgar Terry (father)

Berniece Iona Terry Hiser (April 6, 1908 – January 5, 1995) was an American writer and schoolteacher.

== Life ==
Berniece Iona Terry Hiser was born April 6, 1908, in Cow Creek, Kentucky, to Wilson Edgar Terry and Ruse Wilder. She has an undergraduate degree from Berea College and earned a master's degree from the University of Kentucky. She taught school for 22 years and then became a librarian.

At age 70, Hiser published Quare Do's in Appalachia: East Kentucky Legends and Memorats (Pikeville, Kentucky: Pikeville College Press, 1978), a collection of folktales, ghost stories, and tales she collected. which was in its second printing by 1981. Many of the stories involve members of her family, including the tale of how her grandmother Sally Wilder Frost was named by Col. John Hunt Morgan. This book was reviewed by Appalachian Journal and Kentucky Folklore Record.

She also wrote a children's book, set in Kentucky during the American Civil War, The Adventure of Charlie and His Wheat-straw Hat: A Memorat illustrated by Mary Szilagyi (1986). which was reviewed by library journals and the media. Hiser wrote about people and events in western Kentucky for the local newspapers.

Hiser lived in Walton, Kentucky, for many years before her death January 5, 1995. She was buried in Pleasant View Cemetery, beside Pleasant View Church, in Grant County, Kentucky. Her husband Ora Hiser, who died January 5, 1999, was later buried beside her.

== Selected publications ==
- Hiser, Berniece Terry (1965-09-30). "Granny's little plaid shawl was worth fighting the soldiers for". The Lexington Herald. p. 40.
- Hiser, Berniece T. (1986). The adventure of Charlie and his wheat-straw hat : a memorat. Mary Szilagyi. New York. ISBN 0-396-08772-8. OCLC 12908970.
- Hiser, Berniece T. (1978). Quare Do's in Appalachia: East Kentucky Legends and Memorats.
