= German Society for Photography =

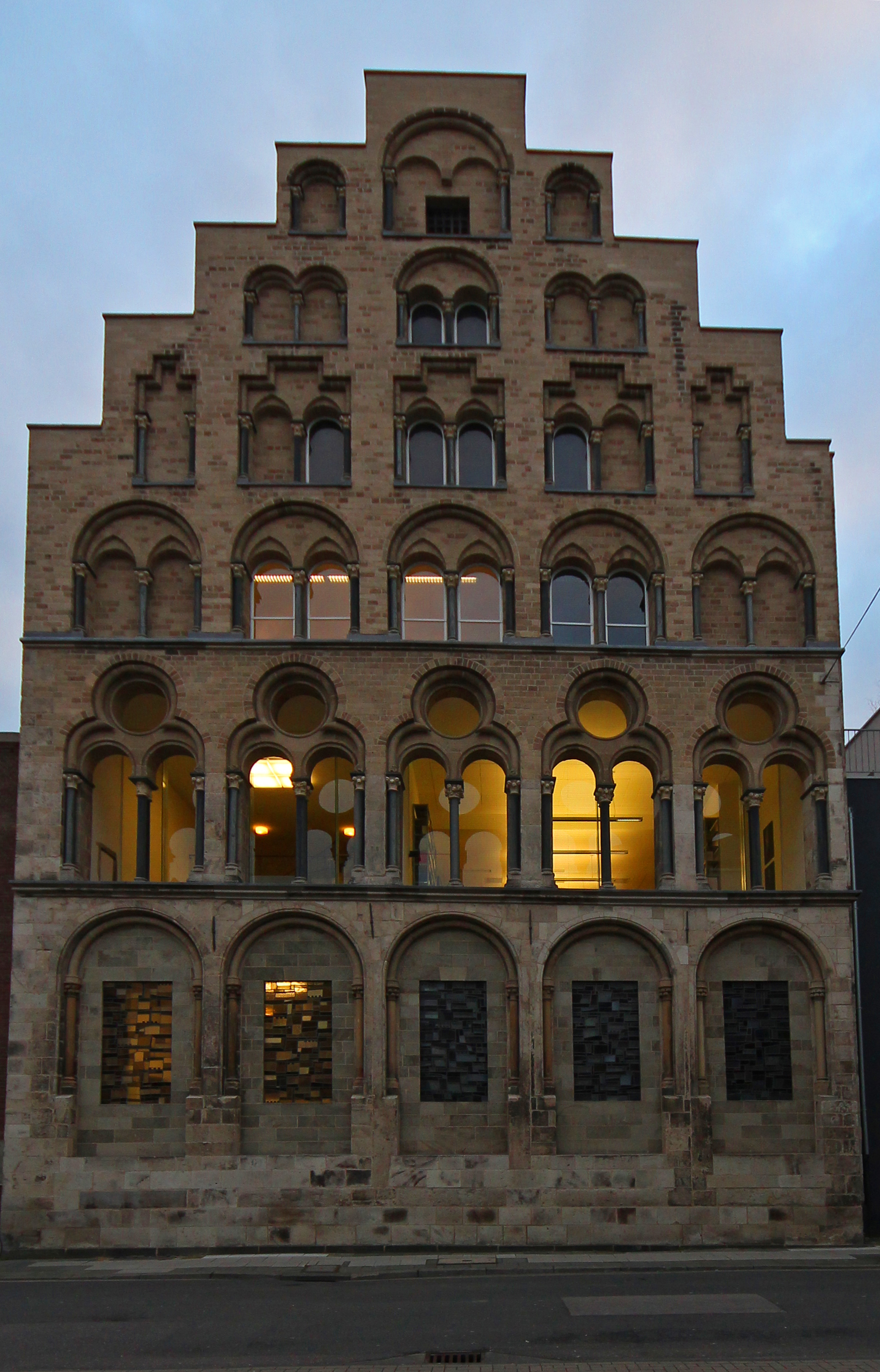
The Overstolzenhaus at 8–12 Rheingasse, Cologne, is part of the headquarters of the German Society for Photography

The German Society for Photography (Deutsche Gesellschaft für Photographie, DGPh) is a German photography organisation, based in Cologne. It is concerned with the application of photography in art, science, education, journalism, economics and politics in cultural contexts.

The DGPh awards prizes for photographic achievements in keeping with its objectives. Its highest award is the Cultural Award (Kulturpreis).

The approximately 1000 appointed members of the DGPh organization come from all areas of photography and are renowned personalities from the German and international photography scene.

== Culture Award ==
The Cultural Award (Kulturpreis) was established in 1958. It recognizes achievements through photography, especially in the artistic, humanitarian, charitable, social, technical, educational or scientific fields. The prize consists of a certificate and a gold-framed optical lens designed by Ewald Mataré and is awarded annually to a living person as the highest honor of the German Society for Photography. Among the winners are scientists, inventors, writers, publishers, editors, lecturers, art directors and above all photographers from Germany and elsewhere.

=== Recipients ===
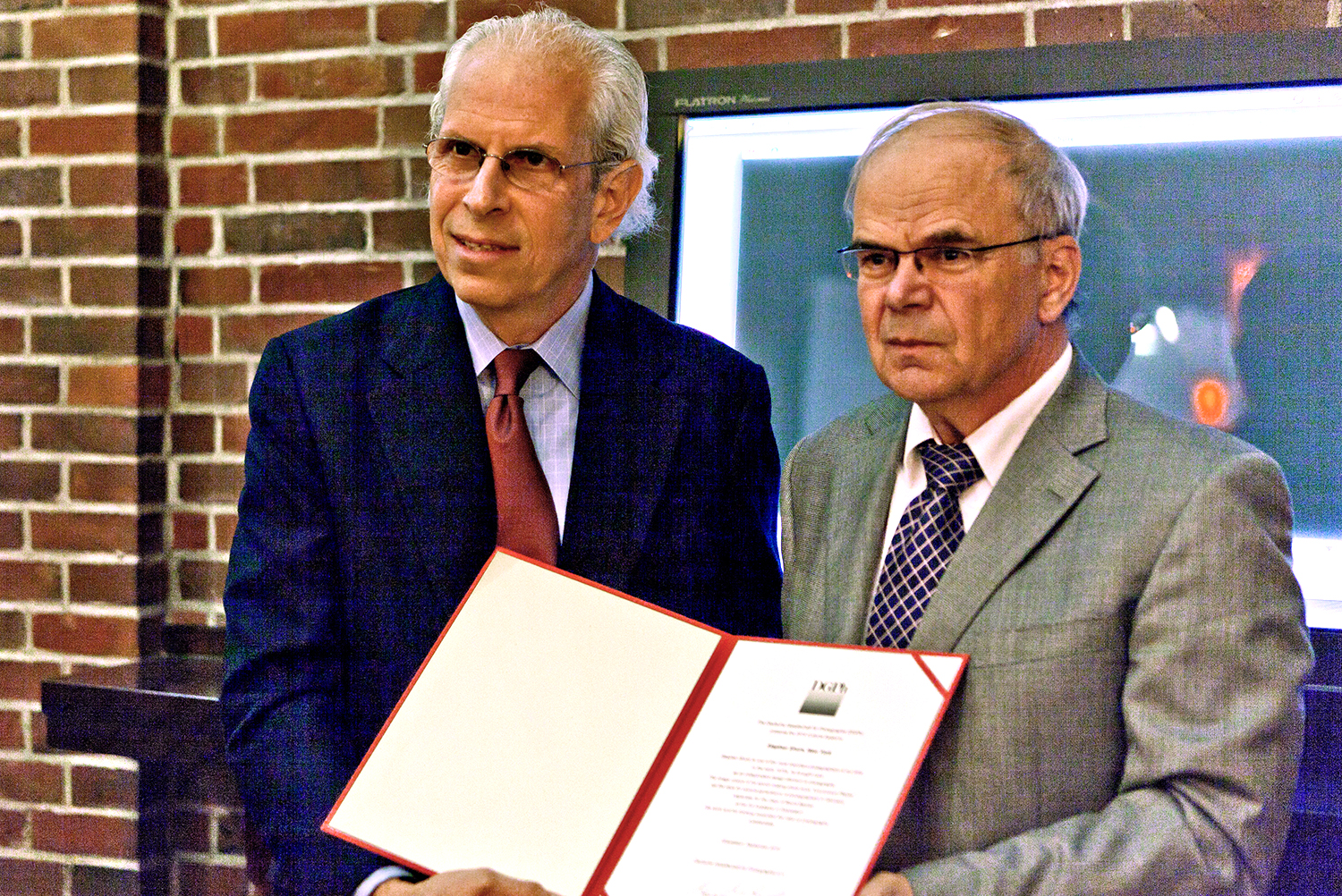
Stephen Shore receiving the Culture Award, with Prof. Dr. Nickel (Chairman of DGPh)

- 1959: Helmut Gernsheim and Robert Janker
- 1960: Fritz Brill and Albert Renger-Patzsch
- 1961: John Eggert, Hilmar Pabel, August Sander and Gustav Wilmanns
- 1962: Alfred Eisenstaedt and Otto Steinert
- 1963: Edith Weyde
- 1964: Fritz Kempe and Emil Schulthess
- 1965: Heinz Hajek-Halke and Felix H. Man
- 1966: Man Ray and Olexander Smakula
- 1967: Henri Cartier-Bresson and Edwin H. Land
- 1968: Bruno Uhl, Chargesheimer, Charlotte March and Thomas Hoepker
- 1969: Herbert Bayer and Hellmut Frieser
- 1970: Beaumont Newhall and Leo Fritz Gruber
- 1971: Dennis Gábor and Josef Svoboda
- 1972: Ernst Haas
- 1973: Walter Bruch, Leopold Godowsky Jr. and Gotthard Wolf
- 1974: Erwin Fieger and Willy Fleckhaus
- 1975: Search service of the German Red Cross
- 1976: Rosemarie Clausen and Regina Relang and Liselotte Strelow
- 1977: Wesley T. Hanson and Eberhard Klein
- 1978: Gisèle Freand
- 1979: Andor Kraszna-Krausz and Allan Porter and Wolf Strache
- 1980: Ludwig Bertele and J. A. Schmoll
- 1981: Harold Eugene Edgerton and Jesse Mitchell
- 1982: Eliot Porter and Reinhart Wolf
- 1983: Karl Pawek (posthumously)
- 1984: Jacques Henri Lartigue
- 1985: Bernd and Hilla Becher
- 1986: Paul K. Weimer
- 1987: Irving Penn
- 1988: William Klein
- 1989: Paul B. Gilman and Erik Moisar and Tadaaki Tani
- 1990: Cornell Capa and Sue Davies and Anna Fárová
- 1991: Peter Keetman
- 1992: Evelyn Richter
- 1993: Lennart Nilsson
- 1994: Christine Frisinghelli and Manfred Willmann
- 1995: Mario Giacomelli
- 1996: Karl Lagerfeld
- 1997: David Hockney
- 1998: Andreas Feininger
- 1999: Gruppe fotoform with Siegfried Lauterwasser, Wolfgang Reisewitz and Toni Schneiders
- 2000: Robert Häusser
- 2001: F. C. Gandlach
- 2002: A. D. Coleman and Richard Misrach
- 2003: Wim Wenders and Mogens S. Koch
- 2004: Daidō Moriyama
- 2005: Wilfried Wiegand
- 2006: Ed Ruscha
- 2007: Sarah Moon and Robert Delpire
- 2008: Steven Sasson
- 2009: Wolfgang Tillmans
- 2010: Stephen Shore
- 2011: Klaus Honnef
- 2012: Manfred P. Kage
- 2013: Maryse Cordesse, Lucien Clergue, Jean-Maurice Rouquette, Michel Tournier
- 2014: Gottfried Jäger
- 2015: Trevor Paglen
- 2016: Lothar Schirmer
- 2017: Duane Michals
- 2018: Wolfgang Kemp

== Otto Steinert Prize ==
The Otto Steinert Prize (Otto-Steinert-Preis) is a biannual scholarship, established in 1979. It is given for a new photography project that will be completed within one year. The prize is 5000 Euros, which can also be shared. The scholarship is open to professional photographers as well as to photographers who are German or are permanently living in Germany. It is named after the photographer and educator Otto Steinert.

- 1979: Hermann Stamm, Kassel
- 1981: Heiner Blum, Kassel; Thomas Deutschmann, Auhagen; Jürgen Hocker, Gaby Winkler, Cologne; Andreas Horlitz, Essen; Holger Stumpf, Hamburg
- 1983: Thomas Berndt, Laatzen
- 1985: Wolfgang Zurborn, Dortmund
- 1987: Ulrich Görlich, Berlin
- 1989: Stefan Dolfen, Essen
- 1991: Gerard Saitner, Kassel
- 1993: Jitka Hanzlová, Essen
- 1995: Arwed Messmer, Berlin
- 1998: Katrin Thomas, New York
- 2000: Axel Boesten, Bochum
- 2002: Dirk Gebhardt, Cologne; Ralf Meyer, Kiel
- 2004: Lukas Roth, Cologne
- 2007: Maziar Moradi, Berlin
- 2009: Pepa Hristova, Hamburg
- 2011: Axel Hoedt, London
- 2013: Björn Siebert, Leipzig
- 2015: Georg Brückmann, Leipzig
- 2017: Ina Schoenenburg, Berlin

== Dr. Erich Salomon Award ==
The Dr. Erich Salomon Award (Dr.-Erich-Salomon-Preis), established in 1971, is an annual award for photography in journalism. The prize consists of a certificate and a Leica M camera with a name engraving. It is named after the German photographer Erich Salomon.

== Prize of the Science and Technology Section ==
The Prize of the Science and Technology Section (Preis der Sektion Wissenschaft und Technik), Established in 1966, it is a prize for research in the field of phototechnology. It was previously called the Robert Luther Prize. "As part of the restructuring of DGPh prices, this will be redefined and named shortly."

=== Recipients ===
- 1966: Klaus Biedermann, Munich for "Determination of the relationship between the subjective quality and the physical properties of the photographic image"
- 1968: Hans-Jörg Metz, Leverkusen for "The Depth of Exposure of Exposure in a Photographic Layer"
- 1969: Helmut Tributsch, Munich for "An Electrochemical Method for the Study of Spectral Sensitization and Heterogeneous Photochemical Reactions at ZnO Electrodes"
- 1971: Erwin Ranz, Leverkusen for "Development of the Equidensity Film 'Agfa-Contour'"
- 1973: Hans-Theo Buschmann, Leverkusen for "Research in the field of sharpness and granularity of photographic materials"
- 1974: Hans J. Einighammer, Mülheim an der Ruhr for "Optical integration methods to reduce the noise of photographic and X-ray astronomical applications"
- 1976: Fritz Habermalz, Tübingen for "Correction of Color Balance in Reverse Color Film Photomicrographs"
- 1978: Udo Bode, Frankfurt for "Spectral sensitization of the charge passage through the phase boundary zinc oxide electrolyte"
- 1981: Josef Schneider, Munich for "Structure, Decay, and Spectral Characteristics of Exposure-Induced Absorption Centers in Silver Bromide Model Emulsions"
- 1989: Wolfgang Schmidt, Leverkusen for "Solid-State Chemical Processes in the Production of Photographic Emulsions"
- 1993: Gerald Hegenbart, Neu-Isenburg for "Atomic Structure Study of AgBr Crystal Surfaces by Atomic Force Microscopy"; Dirk Hertel, Dresden for "Studies on the image quality of photographic layers by means of optoelectronic image sensors"; Thomas Muessig-Pabst, Neu-Isenburg for "The microwave absorption - a meaningful method for the characterization of silver halide systems"
- 1995: Jörg Siegel, Leverkusen for "Investigations on the influence of absorbents on the concentration of interstitial silver ions in the AgBr microcrystals of photographic emulsions"
- 2009: Gerhard Bonnet, Waldfischbach Castle albums for "Development of SpheroCam HDR Full Spherical Camera System"
- 2014: Philipp Sandhaus, Oldenburg and Christoph Voges, Brunswick

== German Camera Award ==
The German Camera Award (Deutscher Kamerapreis) is awarded by the Westdeutscher Rundfunk, the City of Cologne and the German Society for Photography. It was established in 1982 as a biannual award for achievements in the field of camera work for film and television. Since 1990, scenic and documentary editing has also been awarded. Since 2001 it has been awarded annually.

The German Camera Award has been awarded in various categories, some of which have been modified from year to year, for the areas of camera and editing. The most significant categories are "feature film", "television film" and "honorary cameraman" (since 1994).

=== Recipients ===
- 1994: Heinz Pehlke
- 1996: Michael Ballhaus
- 1998: Gernot Roll
- 2001: Jost Vacano
- 2002: Jürgen Jürges
- 2003: Franz Rath
- 2004: Xaver Schwarzenberger
- 2005: Robby Müller
- 2006: Elfi Mikesch
- 2007: David Slama
- 2008: Carl F. Hutterer
- 2009: Joseph Vilsmaier
- 2010: Arri
- 2011: Axel Block
- 2012: Judith Kaufmann
- 2013: Frank Griebe
- 2014: Renato Berta
- 2015: Sławomir Idziak
- 2016: Pio Corradi
- 2017: Jo Heim
- 2018: Birgit Gudjonsdottir

== History of Photography Research Award ==
The History of Photography Research Award (Forschungspreis Photographiegeschichte), established in 1978, is an award for scientific research into the history and theory of photography. Until 2010 it was known as the Erich-Stenger Prize.

=== Recipients ===
- 1978: Heinz Gebhardt – Royal Bavarian Photography. 1838-1918
- 1979: Fritz Kempe – Daguerreotype in Germany
- 1980: Dr. Ursula Peters – style history of photography in Germany
- 1981: Dr. Ulrich Keller, Gunther Sander – August Sander. People of the 20th century
- 1984: Martina Mettner – A Sociological Analysis of German Artistic Photography in the 70s
- 1986: Gerhard Glüher – Photograph at the Bauhaus
- 1988: Dorothea Ritter – Venice Paintings in the 19th Century. A perception-historical investigation with special consideration of the photograph
- 1990: Ludger Derenthal – On a History of Photography in Germany from 1945 to 1953
- 1992: Dorothea Peters – Meisenbach, Riffarth & Co - On the Image Production of a Graphic Arts Institution at the Turn of the Century
- 1994: Ute Wrocklage – Photography of the concentration camps
- 1996: Dr. P. Brinkemper – Erich Stenger - a collector and his understanding
- 2000: Dr. Marianne Bieger-Thielemann – The effect of important conferences and congresses of the DGPh since 1951
- 2002: Dr. Matthias Harder – Greek temple architecture as a photographic staging
- 2005 / 2006: Dr. Christiane Stahl – Alfred Ehrhardt - natural philosopher with the camera. Landscapes and natural objects in photography from 1933 to 1947
- 2008: Dr. Angela Matyssek – art history as a photographic practice. Richard Hamann and photo Marburg
- 2010: Dr. Jan von Brevern – Deferred images. Photography and geology around 1850 "
- 2012: Dr. Estelle Blaschke – Photography and the Commodification of Images. The Bettmann Archive and Corbis (circa 1924-present)
- 2014: Prof. Dr. Steffen Siegel – New light. Daguerre, Talbot and the publication of photography in 1839
- 2016: Dr. Katharina Steidl – On the edge of photography. A medial history of the photogram in the 19th century
- 2018: Kathrin Schönegg – Photography history of abstraction

== Prize for Science Photography ==
The Prize for Science Photography (Preis für Wissenschaftsphotographie) is awarded for work that documents a scientific (including medicine) topic or artistically deals with a scientific topic. Prior to 2017 the prize was called the Herbert Schober Prize, after the founder and first chairman of DGPh's section for medical and scientific photography in 1957.

=== Recipients ===
- 2017: Bochum Jannis Wiebusch

== Education Award ==
The Education Award (Bildungspreis) was established in 2013. It is awarded for innovative and sustainable projects as well as scientific papers with practical relevance. These include cultural and museum educational initiatives in which photography is discussed or used, as well as medial educational offerings on photography as well as school and extracurricular activities. The prize is 1000 Euros.

== Publications ==
- Otto-Steinert-Preis 1979 - 1998: Ausstellung zur Photokina 1998, 16. 9. – 21. 9. 1998. Cologne: Locher, 1998. By Tina Schelhorn. ISBN 9783930054329.
- Zeitprofile: Deutsche Gesellschaft für Photographie: German Society for Photography. Göttingen: Steidl, 2014. ISBN 978-3869307497.
