= Toni Schneiders =

German photographer

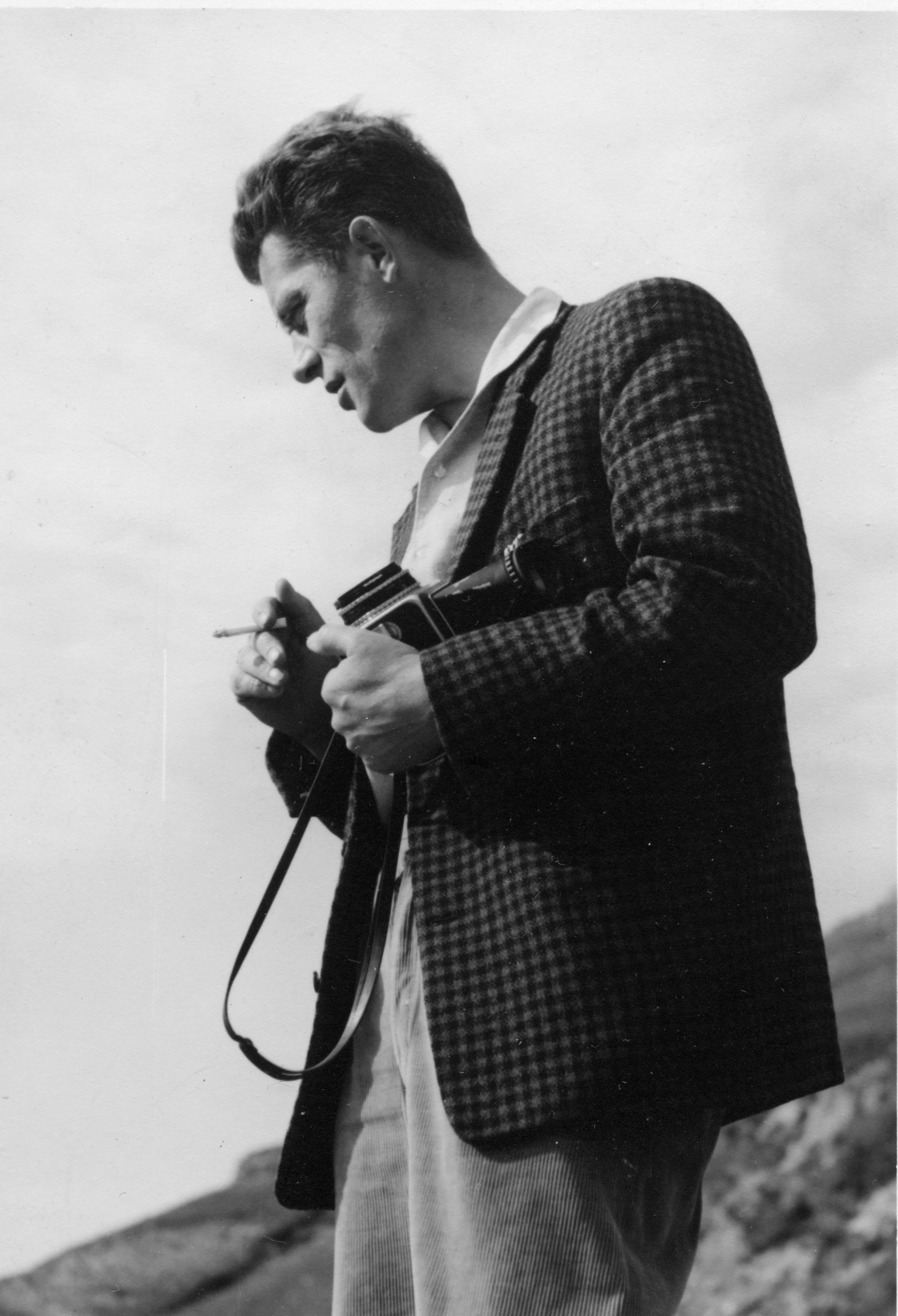
- Toni Schneiders, Crete 1958
- Born: April 27, 1920; Urbar, Germany
- Died: August 4, 2006 (aged 86); Lindau, Germany
- Known for: Photography
- Movement: fotoform
- Spouse: Ingeborg Schneiders (m. 1951)

Toni Schneiders (May 13, 1920 – August 4, 2006) was a German photographer.

== Life and career ==
Schneiders took up an apprenticeship as a photographer at Menzel Studio in Koblenz in 1935 graduating with a master's certificate in 1938. During the Second World War he was drafted and would join the Fallschirmjäger in 1942. He deployed as a war correspondent in France and Italy, famously capturing Operation Oak on film.

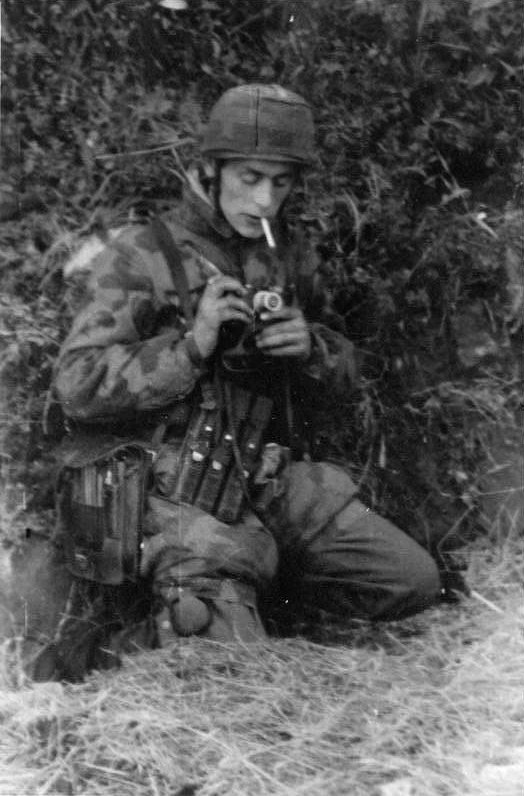
Schneiders with a Leica camera, near Nettuno, Italy, February 1944

After the war, he returned to Koblenz and photographed reportages as well as advertising and landscape photographs. In 1946 he moved to Meersburg, where he opened a photo studio in 1948. In 1949 Schneiders went to Lindau as an independent photojournalist, where he lived and worked with his wife Ingeborg from 1952 until his death in 2006. His archive is housed in the F. C. Gundlach Foundation in Hamburg, his war photography in the German Federal Archive in Koblenz.

In 1949 Schneiders co-founded the avant-garde photography group fotoform alongside Siegfried Lauterwasser, Peter Keetman, Wolfgang Reisewitz, Otto Steinert and Ludwig Windstoßer. With their graphically designed images, the fotoform photographers referred to the photographic trends of the 1920s and early 1930s and drew attention to the creative possibilities of photography.

Schneiders was also significantly involved in the development of the so-called subjective photography in the 1950s, which became internationally known through exhibitions and publications under the title Subjektive Fotografie compiled by Otto Steinert. Until his death in 2005, Schneiders was in close contact with Peter Keetman. Toni Schneiders' images are distinguished from those of his companions by their sensitive capturing of people in everyday life.

Schneiders worked commercially for publishing houses that created photographic picture books on cities, countries and regions. From 1950 he travelled through Germany, Europe, North Africa and Southeast Asia for these illustrated books.

== Selected exhibitions ==
- Epische Kamera, Staatliche Landesbildstelle, Hamburg 1962
- Bilder des bekannten Lindauer Künslter-Fotografen Toni Schneiders, Rungesaal, Lindau 1963
- Farbfotografien, Landesbildstelle Stuttgart 1966
- Toni Schneiders, GDL – Fotograf, Fotomuseum im Stadtmuseum, Munich 1982
- Toni Schneiders, fotoform, Kornhaus Galerie, Weingarten 1994
- Toni Schneiders, Photographien 1946–1980, Fotomuseum im Stadtmuseum, Munich 1999 and other locations
- Ein Klassiker der deutschen Fotografie, Museum für Photographie, Braunschweig 2004
- Toni Schneiders: Fotografie, Landesmuseum Koblenz 2006 and other locations
- Tony Schneiders: Fotografie, Opelvillen, Rüsselsheim 2013
- 2019/2020: Ludwig Windstosser. Fotografie der Nachkriegsmoderne, Museum für Fotografie, Berlin

== Selected bibliography ==
Toni Schneiders published more than 100 photobooks, which are completely or partially illustrated with his images, e.g.:

- Lindau am Bodensee, Jan Thorbecke Verlag, Lindau 1950
- Meersburg, Jan Thorbecke Verlag, Lindau 1953 (together with Siegfried Lauterwasser)
- Dänemark, Hanns Reich Verlag, Munich 1957
- Äthiopien, Hanns Reich Verlag, Munich 1958
- Sardinien, Fretz & Wasmuth, Zürich 1958

etc.

- Meister der Leica, in: Leica Fotografie, No 5 1952
- Toni Schneiders – German Photo Ace, in: U.S. Camera No 11 1956
- Über einen Photographen: Toni Schneiders, in: Photomagazin No 2 1959
- Ute Eskildsen (Ed.): Subjektive Fotografie – Bilder der 50er Jahre, Folkwang Verlag, Essen 1984
- Landesmuseum Koblenz (Ed.): Toni Schneiders, Hatje Cantz Verlag, Ostfildern 2008, ISBN 978-3-7757-2182-0

== Awards ==
- 1999 Kulturpreis der Deutschen Gesellschaft für Photographie

== Sources ==
- Literature by and about Toni Schneiders in the German National Library catalogue
- Website of Toni Schneiders
- Toni Schneiders in the F. C. Gundlach Foundation
- Toni Schneiders in the German Federal Archive
- Bilder von Toni Schneiders in the Deutsche Fotothek
