= David Octavius Hill Medal =

The David Octavius Hill Medal is a prize in photography established in 1955, by the Deutsche Fotografische Akademie. It is named in honor of the Scottish artist David Octavius Hill, famous for his Hill & Adamson calotypes, most of which were developed at Adamson's studio, the "Rock House", on Calton Hill in Edinburgh.

== Recipients ==
- 1955: Walter Hege, Carl Adolf Schleussner, Erich Stenger, Bruno Uhl
- 1957: Albert Renger-Patzsch
- 1958: Erna Lendvai-Dircksen
- 1964: Herbert List
- 1965: Otto Steinert
- 1966: Martin Hürlimann
- 1967: Paul Strand
- 1968: Fritz Gruber
- 1969: Liselotte Strelow
- 1970: Allan Porter
- 1971: Edouard Boubat
- 1972: Regina Relang
- 1973: J.A. Schmoll, gen. Eisenwerth
- 1974: Fritz Kempe
- 1978: Heinz Hajek-Halke, Willi Moegle
- 1979: Fritz Brill, Kurt Julius
- 1981: Peter Keetman
- 1983: Helmut Gernsheim
- 1984: Robert Häusser
- 1986: John Hilliard
- 1988: Joan Fontcuberta
- 1990: Stefan Moses
- 1994: Jürgen Heinemann, Klaus Kammerichs
- 1996: Gottfried Jäger
- 1999: Dieter Appelt
- 2002: Alex Webb
- 2005: Bernhard Prinz
- 2009: Joakim Eskildsen, Cia Rinne
- 2015: Viviane Sassen
- 2019: Ute & Werner Mahler
