= Lendvai =

Lendvai is a Hungarian surname. Notable people with the surname include:

- Erna Lendvai-Dircksen (1883–1962), German photographer
- Ernő Lendvai (1925–1993), Hungarian music theorist
- Erwin Lendvai (1882–1949), Hungarian composer and choral conductor
- Ildikó Lendvai (born 1946), Hungarian politician
- Miklós Lendvai (born 1975), Hungarian footballer
- Paul Lendvai (born 1929), Hungarian-born Austrian journalist
- Péter Lendvai (born 1975), Hungarian footballer
- Tibor Lendvai (born 1940), Hungarian cyclist
