= Luminogram =

Artwork made with photosensitive materials

Luminogram darkroom print on silver gelatin paper

A luminogram is an image, usually made with an artistic purpose, created by exposure of photosensitive materials to light without the intervention of an object.

== Technique ==
The luminogram is a variation on the photogram, made in the darkroom directly on photosensitive paper and chemically developed and fixed normally.

While the photogram employs the shadows of objects, in the luminogram the light is modulated by varying the intensity through distance from the photosensitive surface, by the power or shape of the light source, or tempered by filters or gels, or by moving the light, often a low-powered torch (flashlight). The paper can itself be shaped to create the desired effects in the final image.

The photography theorist and practitioner of the luminogram Gottfried Jäger describes this as "the result of pure light design; the rudimentary expression of an interaction of light and photosensitive material… a kind of self representation of light."

== History ==
=== Twentieth century ===
Many of László Moholy-Nagy's "photograms" were luminograms. In the 1920s, Moholy-Nagy, with his wife Lucia Moholy, began experimenting with photograms. He produced photogram and luminogram images from 1922 in Berlin and continuously until his death in 1946. Chronologically they fall into three groups:

- Berlin Bauhaus period (1923–1928)
- exile in London (1935–1937)
- exile in the United States (1937–1946)

Moholy-Nagy considered the "mysteries" of the light effects and the analysis of space as experienced through the photogram to be important principles that he experimentally explored and advanced in his teaching throughout his life. His luminograms are related to his sculptural experiments with projected light on his 'light modulator' machines starting with the Lichtrequisit einer elektrischen Bühne [Light Prop for an Electric Stage] (completed 1930), a device with moving parts meant to have light projected through it in order to create mobile light reflections and shadows on nearby surfaces.

Moholy-Nagy's luminograms are concerned exclusively with light and design. Moholy-Nagy approached the light-sensitive photographic paper as a blank canvas and used light to paint on the surface with and without the interference of an intervening object.

German immigrant to America Lotte Jacobi, encouraged by colleague Leo Katz, produced a large number of luminograms 1946 and 1951, which she called Light Pictures using electric torches covered in fabric and candles to project light onto photographic paper with a dancing motion.

The experimental German fotoform group, from 1949, produced luminograms, though their leader Otto Steinert and member Peter Keetman produced their abstract images by pointing a camera, with shutter open, at light sources to produce light trails. Another, Heinz Hajek-Halke, eliminated the camera.

Photographie Concrète was a movement first exhibited in 1967 in Bern, and comprised Swiss photographers, including Roger Humbert, who made luminograms first shown in Ungegenständliche Fotografie ('Nonrepresentational Photography'), 1960 in Basel, amongst René Mächler, Rolf Schroeter, Jean Frédéric Schnyder who each made camera-less imagery. Associated with them was Heinrich Heidersberger who made 'rhythmogrammes' with a machine devised to control the motion of a light globe swinging repeatedly across the surface of photographic paper to create looping and arrayed patterns.

=== Contemporary practice ===
Irish artist Martina Corry's series Colour Works (2008) and Photogenic Drawings (2000), she folds and crumples photographic paper, then flattens it before exposing it to the light of the enlarger so that after development it retains photographic representation of folds on top of the actual folded photograph, and as Corry notes, “although abstract in appearance, the works document the history of their own making”. In other works, such as Lumen and Luminograms (both 2004), she 'draws' directly on the paper using optical fibres at varying distances from the surface of the photographic emulsion.

British duo, the husband and wife team Rob and Nick Carter make artworks in a range of media that are concerned with visual perception. These include photograms, some made directly from stained-glass windows in-situ, and also luminograms in the form of Harmonograms, achieved with a technique similar to Heidersberger's 'rhythmogrammes' (above). Their series entitled Luminograms from around 2007 to 2011, are harmonograms of colours arranged in a concentric 'target' pattern and others made by illuminating direct-positive photographic paper to produce an edge-to-edge gradated tone. The one-metre-square prints are then presented under the continuously changing illumination of C-200s LED light sources scrolling through the spectrum. The arrangement perverts the human ability to perceive a colour as constant even under changing lighting conditions. Instead, the static photographic prints themselves appear to change hue perversely. The artworks have attracted the interest of perceptual psychologists.

Oliver Chanarin and Adam Broomberg used the luminogram in their approach to imaging war, in a project The Day that Nobody Died (2008) in which they adopted the conceptual, pragmatic strategy of exposing a roll of photographic paper directly to ‘front line’ Afghan light and filming British troops, with whom they were embedded, carrying the heavy cardboard box containing it. The wittingly ludicrous video documentation of the journey of the box and the content-free, but suggestive, luminogram brings to the fore the legitimacy of art as a representation of the theatre of war. The work was included in the Tate Modern exhibition Conflict, Time, Photography November 26, 2014 March 15, 2015.

British artist Mike Jackson developed a unique aesthetic in 2014 using the luminogram process to create sculptural silver gelatin prints. His decade long study of luminogram work has been exhibited in London ‘The Self Representation of Light’ and in New York ‘Birdsong’, and his book exploring the connection between his luminogram process and Edwin Abbott Abbott's work ‘Flatland’ is part of the library collection of the National Gallery of Art, Washington.
