= Eskildsen =

Eskildsen is a surname of Dano-Norwegian origin, and is most popularly used as a surname in the countries of Denmark and Norway. The first instance of the surname Eskildsen being used was in 1718 in what is now Akershus County, Norway. The first record of an Eskildsen immigration to the United States came in 1869. The surname also has variants such as Esckilsen (in United States of America), Eskilsson (in Sweden), and Eskildson.

Notable people with the surname Eskildsen include:

- Eigil Eskildsen (1922–1995), Danish GLBT rights pioneer
- Brett Eskildsen (born 2005), American football player
- Joakim Eskildsen (born 1971), Danish photographer
- Rosario María Gutiérrez Eskildsen (1899–1979), Mexican linguist and lexicographer

Notable people with the surname Esckilsen include:

- Dr. Erik Esckilsen Professor at Champlain College and author of multiple works
- Dr. Lee A. Esckilsen Jr., Professor at Johnson & Wales University
- Dr. Scott Joseph Esckilsen, MD, Doctor in Mount Pleasant, South Carolina
- Andrew Lawrence Esckilsen (1858–1940), First recorded Esckilsen in America
- Clinton Esckilsen, served in the military and served at the Stanley R. Mickelson Safeguard Complex
