= Steven F. Joseph =

British and Belgian historian

- Born: 24 October 1955; Salford, Lancashire, England
- Education: University of Oxford
- Occupation: Historian of photography

Steven Franklin Joseph (born 24 October 1955) is a collector and historian of photography, active in Belgium and in France.

== Life and career ==
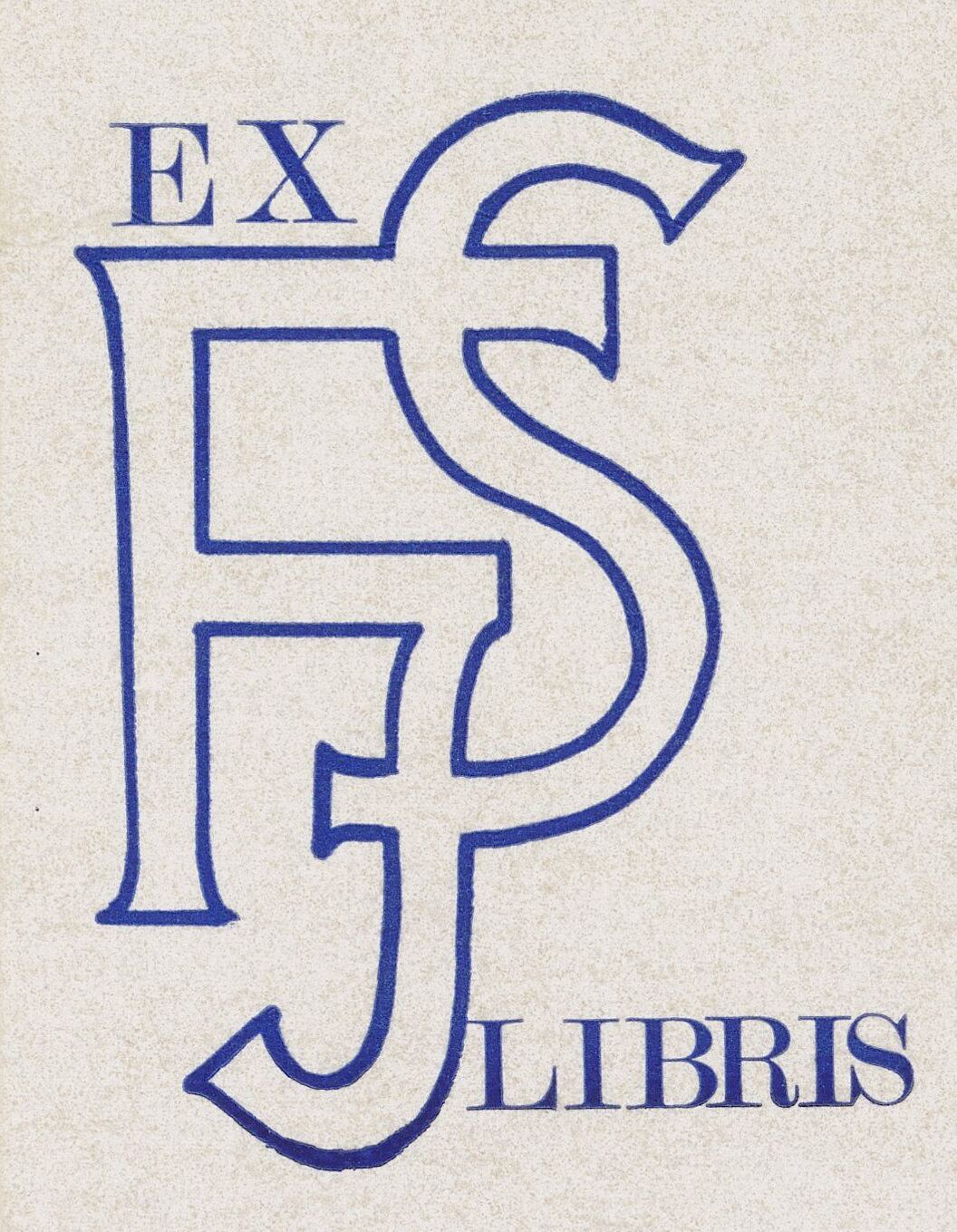
Ex libris of Steven F. Joseph

Joseph was born in Salford, Lancashire, England, on 24 October 1955. He has degrees in modern languages (University of Oxford) and management studies (École des affaires de Paris-ESCP Europe).

An author of numerous articles and books on nineteenth-century photography in Belgium, Joseph also researches the application of photography to book illustration and photomechanical printing processes. His current research topics include early advertising photography and the development of large format images on posters and broadsides up to 1914. He has helped to design and organize several exhibitions in his specialist fields. In 2001, the Rijksmuseum acquired his collection of 19th-century photographically illustrated books, amounting to some two thousand volumes.

Joseph then built a second collection that aimed to trace the parallel development of photomechanical processes and advertising photography, from the earliest days up to 1914. This second collection has also found a permanent home in the Rijksmuseum, where it was transferred in January 2023.

Joseph is a Fellow of the Royal Photographic Society and corresponding member of the German Society for Photography.

== Select bibliography ==
- Le Chevalier L.P.T. Dubois de Nehaut (1799–1872): sa vie et son œuvre (with Tristan Schwilden), Bruxelles, Crédit Communal, 1987 (ISBN 2-87193-026-0)
- Edmond Fierlants (1819–1869): photographies d’art et d’architecture (with Tristan Schwilden), Bruxelles, Crédit Communal, 1988 (ISBN 2-87193-060-0)
- De andere fotografie: de geschiedenis van de fotomechanische reproduktie in de negentiende eeuw (with Adriaan Verburg), Vlissingen / Middelburg, ADZ, 1989 (ISBN 90-72838-03-3)
- A l’aube de la photographie en Belgique: Guillaume Claine (1811–1869) et son cercle (with Tristan Schwilden), Bruxelles, Crédit Communal, 1991 (ISBN 2-87183-014-2)
- Directory of Photographers in Belgium 1839–1905 (with Tristan Schwilden & Marie-Christine Claes), Anvers & Rotterdam, Museum voor Fotografie & C. De Vries-Brouwers, 1997 (ISBN 90-6174-837-2) (Prix Raymond Lécuyer 1997 du Musée français de la Photographie). A digital version, in the form of an interactive database, went online in December 2016. This database is continuously updated
- Photographie et mutations urbaines à Bruxelles 1850–1880 / Photography and the transformation of Brussels 1850–1880 (with Christian Spapens), Bruxelles, CIDEP – Centre d'Information, de Documentation et d'Etude du Patrimoine, 2008 (ISBN 978-2-930535-00-5)
- Belgian Photographic Literature of the 19th Century. A Bibliography and Census. L'édition photographique belge au 19^{e} siècle. Bibliographie et recensement, Leuven, Leuven University Press, 2015 (ISBN 978 94 6270 047 5)
