= Gottfried Jäger =

German photographer and theorist of photography

Gottfried Jäger (born 13 May 1937) is a German photographer, photo-theorist and former university teacher.

== Biography ==
Gottfried Jäger, son of photographer Ernst Jäger (1913-1998), learned the craft of photography in the years 1954 to 1958 with the master photographer Siegfried Baumann in Bielefeld, receiving his apprenticeship qualification in 1957. He then studied technical photography at the Staatliche Höhere Fachschule für Photographie in Cologne, graduating in 1960 from the master craftsman exam. There he discovered a work by the early pioneer of computer art, Herbert W. Franke's 1957 Kunst und Konstruktion. Its subtitle, Physik und Mathematik als fotografisches Experiment (Physics and Mathematics as a Photographic Experiment) became Jäger's credo, an approach that he maintained throughout his career.

In 1960, Jäger accepted a position as a technical teacher of photography at the Werkkunstschule Bielefeld and established the medium as a basic discipline there. In 1972, this led to the founding of Photo/Film Design as a specialisation at the University of Applied Sciences Bielefeld, with contemporary photography and media studies. In the same year, Jäger was appointed Professor of Photography and Film at the University of Applied Sciences Bielefeld in the subject areas Artistic Foundations of Photography, Photography and Generative Image Systems. In 1984 he founded the research focus (FSP) Photography and Media with the annual Bielefeld photo symposia. From 1998 to 2002, Jäger was visiting professor at the Royal Melbourne Institute of Technology (RMIT) Melbourne, returning in 2009 to join in a symposium About Photography II with David Martin, Salvatore Panatteri, Emidio Puglielli and Patricia Todarello, 12 September – 4 October.

In 2002 he retired from Bielefeld and was given the emeritus status. On the occasion of his retirement, the institution praised Jäger's decisive contribution to photography being "given equal status with the arts of painting and sculpture. As early as 1968, he defined the claim of photography as an art form with the term 'Generative Photography', which stands for a systematic-constructive direction in artistic photography." Incidentally, it was not until 1984 that photographs had become legally works of visual art according to German copyright law.

Jäger was for eight years Dean of the Faculty of Design and from 1993 to 1997 Vice President for research and development tasks of the FH Bielefeld. Since 2008 he is a member of the University Council of FH Bielefeld; he is a member, honorary member and has been the chairman of many photographic associations for many years (DFA, DGPh, BFF, FFA). In 1992 he received the George Eastman Medal of Kodak AG Germany; 1996 the David Octavius Hill Medal of the German Photographic Academy (DFA).

In 2011, Jäger defended his PhD dissertation on the photographic work of Carl Strüwe in a thesis Photomicrography as Obsession: The Photographic Work of Carl Strüwe (1898-1988) at the Faculty of Linguistics and Literature of the University of Bielefeld.

== Artwork ==
From the beginning of his teaching at the Werkkunstschule Bielefeld Jäger created experimental photographic works, such as the Themes and Variations from 1960 to 1965. In each case a single image with different photographic design parameters is serially, controlled and varied step by step. The sometimes extensive series of images ultimately lead to photo compositions in the sense of Concrete Art, whose works dispensed with representation in favour of the free image as invention. An example of this are 21 light graphics that Jäger created in 1964 as figurative equivalents to the text "novel" of the German writer Helmut Heißenbüttel .

One of Jäger's inspirations was computer scientist Karl Steinbuch's 1961 book Automat und Mensch, an early discussion of artificial intelligence which proposed that a technical apparatus, a camera or a computer, were capable of achieving intellectual results and aesthetic products. The text was brought to his attention in the mid-60s by Hein Gravenhorst, a friend and fellow artist in generative photography, whom he had met through Manfred Kage. Gravenhorst and Kage were together making their own "polychromatic variations."

In 1965 Jäger was invited to show his "Lichtgrafiken" (light graphics) at the group show Fotografie '65 in Bruges, an exhibition of rarely experimental and often abstract photography that was conceptually opposite to that organized by Karl Pawek, also then showing in Bruges; the documentary Weltausstellung der Photographie: Was ist der Mensch ('World Exhibition of Photography: What is Man').

In 1968, Gottfried Jäger introduced the term Generative Photography as means of constructing photography on a systematic-constructive basis in the title of an exhibition of the Bielefelder Kunsthaus. Apart from his own, works by Kilian Breier, Pierre Cordier and Hein Gravenhorst were also included. The title, which was also approved by Franke, draws on the idea of generative aesthetics (1965) of the German philosopher Max Bense promulgated in the last chapter of his Aesthetica titled 'Projekte generativer Ästhetik';

Generative aesthetics is an aesthetic by creation. It allows a methodical creation of aesthetic states by dissecting the creation into a finite number of specifiable and describable single steps.

Thus works of Generative Photography are a rational, apparatus-driven art confluent with the emerging computer age that follow a programmed design that applies mathematical and numerical parameters to artistic projects, and which equally entails development of 'concrete' artistic approaches. A favourable reception of the exhibition in the press was repeated by Otto Steinert during a meeting in the exhibition space of the Deutsche Gesellschaft für Photographie (German Society for Photography). Follow-up exhibitions around this topic took place at Galerie Spektrum in Hanover, in Antwerp, and elsewhere.

Jäger defined the Generative Photography process as one of "finding a new world inside the camera and trying to bring it out with a methodical, analytical system." Jäger elaborates; "[my] image is the concretion of the technique from which it arises, [...] it is technique that has become art. The technique has become art. The technique is art."

An expression of this is the series of works by Gottfried Jäger from the years 1967 to 1973: about 200 black-and-white and coloured light graphics on the basis of a point of light, which by means of a multiple-pinhole camera that he invented to generate geometrically determined structures.

In his camera photographs of natural and technical objects from 1971 to 1991, Jäger consistently pursues the serial principle of logical sequences. In a series titled Arndt Street (1971), he used the predetermined system of photographing only corners in two-point perspective, which he described simply as, "A photographic documentation of the development of a street depicted through examples of corner buildings."

In his group of luminogram works Colour Systems of the early 1980s, photographic paper no longer appears as a picture carrier but as an object of the artistic process. This resulted in photo objects, photo installations and installations in museums and galleries. They follow not so much a programmed procedure in the sense of generative photography as spontaneous inspiration in dealing with the peculiarities of the photographic material, such as its imaging properties, its peculiar surfaces and its distinct plastic qualities. For their titles, photography terms like Graukeil ('Greyscale 1983), Lichteinfall ('Incident Light', 1985), "Fotoecken" (Photo-corners, 1985) or "Bild" (View, 2000) are used.

From 1994, digital media were used to create "mosaics" and from 1996 "generative images". Both groups of works are inspired and derived from the optical program of the pinhole structures, but they modify it through digitization and lead to their own forms. The "Snapshots" (2003), comparable to the photographic snapshot, are 'snaps' from the infinite cosmos of the computer - but still on a geometrical-constructive basis. Recent works under the series title "Photos" (2004) thematise "photographicisms". As such, phototypical aesthetic appearances can be seen - but in this case they are no longer photographically generated, but computer generated and executed (Digigraphics™).

== Reception ==
Jäger's oeuvre has been seen in over 30 solo exhibitions internationally including Germany, Switzerland, Belgium, Poland, USA, and Australia, but especially significant is his early inclusion in iconic exhibitions of technological and computer art of the 1960s: Experiments in Art and Technology at the Brooklyn Museum, (1968); New Tendencies in Zagreb (1969); and the exhibitions of On the Path to Computer Art that were shown in Germany, Switzerland, Japan, Brazil, France, and England between 1970 and 1976.

Jäger has authored over thirty books including texts in English: The Art of Abstract Photography (2002), Can Photography Capture our Time in Images? A Time-Critical Balance (2004), Concrete Photography (2005) and Light Image and Data Image: Traces of Concrete Photography (2015) and nine Jäger monographs have been published since 1964.

== Awards ==
- 1996: David Octavius Hill Medal of the Society of German Photographers
- 2014: 2014 Cultural Award of the German Society for Photography

== Exhibitions ==
=== Solo ===
- 1964 Gottfried Jäger. Photographs, light graphics. Art Salon Otto Fischer, Bielefeld.
- 1975 Gottfried Jäger. Apparative graphics. Gallery Le Disque Rouge, Brussels.
- 1982 Gottfried Jäger. Light images. Generative work. Fotomuseum in the Munich City Museum.
- 1986 Gottfried Jäger. Generative photo works. Gallery Photo-Medium-Art, Wroclaw
- 1990 Gottfried Jäger. Photo paper works photo installations. Gallery Anita Neugebauer, Basel.
- 1994 Gottfried Jäger. Interface: Generative work. Bielefelder Kunstverein, Museum Waldhof, catalogue.
- 1995 Gottfried Jäger. Photo Paper Works. Michael Senft - One Bond Gallery, New York.
- 1998 Gottfried Jäger. Photography. Gallery Arrigo, Zurich.
- 1999 Gottfried Jäger. Melbourne Experience. VISCOM 9 Gallery, Dep. Visual Communication, RMIT University (Royal Melbourne Institute of Technology).
- 2000 Gottfried Jäger. Generative Images. Lutz Teutloff Gallery, Bielefeld, catalogue.
- 2006 Gottfried Jäger and his collection of Concrete Photography. 16th Gmundner symposium on contemporary art, Gmunden, Austria, book documentation.
- 2011 Gottfried Jäger: consequences of consequences of consequences of consequences of consequences. Concrete photography. Photo Edition Berlin.

=== Group ===
- 1965 Fotograph '65. Experimental European photography. Huidevettershuis, Bruges, catalogue.
- 1966 Photography between science and art. Photokina, Cologne, catalogue.
- 1968 Generative Photography. Kilian Breier, Pierre Cordier, Hein Gravenhorst, Gottfried Jäger. Städt. Kunsthaus Bielefeld, catalogue.
- 1969 Experiments in Art and Technology. Brooklyn Museum, New York, catalogue.
- 1969 Nova tendcija 4. (New artistic tendencies). Muzej za umjetnost i obrt, Zagreb, catalogue.
- 1970-1976 Paths to computer art. Traveling exhibition of the German Goethe-Instituts, including Berlin (IDZ), Zurich (ETH), Goethe-Institute Tokyo, São Paulo, Brasilia, Rio de Janeiro, Bordeaux (SIGMA 9, 1973), Marseille, Angers: London (Polytechnic of Central) etc., catalogues.
- 1975 Generative Photography: Pierre Cordier, Karl Martin Holzhäuser, Gottfried Jäger. Internationaal Cultureel Center Antwerp, catalogue.
- 1980 German photographers after 1945. Kunstverein Kassel 1979; PPS Gallery Hamburg 1980; Overbeck-Gesellschaft Lübeck, catalogue.
- 1982 5th International Biennale Advanced Photography. Vienna Secession, Vienna, catalogue.
- 1984 Lensless Photography. The Franklin Institute Science Museum, Philadelphia, 1983, catalogue; IBM Gallery, New York, Prospect.
- 1986 Positions of experimental photography. Bielefeld. Kunsthalle Bielefeld, catalogue.
- 1989/1990 The photograph as an autonomous picture. Experimental Design 1839-1989. Kunsthalle Bielefeld, 1989; Bavarian Academy of Fine Arts, Munich, catalogue.
- 1989/1990 Document and Invention: photographs from the Federal Republic of Germany 1945 to today. German Photographic Academy GDL, Berlin, Freiburg i. Br. 1989; Philadelphia 1990, catalogue.
- 1991 Appearance and Time: photography in a generative context (with Markus Jäger). Photo gallery Bild, Baden, Switzerland, brochure.
- 1994 Future of Korean Photography. Seoul (Korea), catalogue.
- 1995 László Moholy-Nagy: idea and effect. Echoes of his work in contemporary art. Kunsthalle Bielefeld, catalogue.
- 1996 La corn de la licorne: Alchemy optique. Rencontres de la Photographie, Arles, France, catalogue.
- 2000 Abstract photography. Kunsthalle Bielefeld, catalogue.
- 2002ff. Concrete art in Europe after 1945. Collection Peter C. Ruppert. Museum in Kulturspeicher Würzburg, permanent exhibition, catalogue.
- 2006 Photography Concrete - Concrete Photography. Shaping with light without camera. Museum in the cultural memory Würzburg. Book Concrete Photography / Concrete Photography, Bielefeld, 2005.
- 2006 Gottfried Jäger und seine Sammlung Konkrete Fotografie with Dawid, Heinz Hajek-Halke, Heinrich Heidersberger, Peter Keetman, Uwe Meise, Floris Neusüss, Jaroslav Rössler & others, VKB-Galerie, Gmunden
- 2007 The New Tendencies. A European artist movement 1961-1973. Museum of Concrete Art Ingolstadt, catalogue.
- 2007/2009 Bit international - Nove tendencije. Computer and visual research. Zagreb 1961–1973. Graz: New Gallery at the Landesmuseum Joanneum, 2007; Karlsruhe: ZKM, 2009, catalogues.
- 2009 Karl Martin Holzhäuser, Gottfried Jäger: Real appearance. Works 2008. Epson Kunstbetrieb Düsseldorf, catalogue.
- 2010 Konkrét Fotó, Photogram. Vasarely Múseum Budapest, catalogue.

== Books and exhibition catalogues ==
- Herbert W. Franke, Gottfried Jäger: Apparative Art. From the kaleidoscope to the computer. Cologne: Publisher M. DuMont Schauberg, 1973, ISBN 3-7701-0660-1.
- Gottfried Jäger, Karl Martin Holzhäuser: Generative Photography. Theoretical foundation, compendium and examples of a photographic image design. Ravensburg: Otto Maier publishing house, 1975, ISBN 3-473-61555-2.
- Strüwe, C., Jäger, G., Kunsthalle Bielefeld., & Kulturhistorisches Museum Bielefeld. (1982). Retrospektive Fotografie. Place of publication not identified: Edition Marzona.
- Gottfried Jäger (editor), Jörg Boström, Karl Martin Holzhäuser: Against the indifference of photography. The Bielefeld Symposia on Photography 1979–1985. Contributions to the aesthetic theory and practice of photography. University of Applied Sciences Bielefeld. Düsseldorf: Edition Marzona, 1986, ISBN 3-921420-27-X.
- Gottfried Jäger: Imaging Photography. Fotografik light graphic light painting. Origins, concepts and specifics of an art form. Cologne: DuMont book publishing house, 1988, ISBN 3-7701-1860-X.
- Gottfried Jäger (ed.): Bielefeld photo life. Small cultural history of photography in Bielefeld and the region 1896–1989. Developments in craft, press, design, art and college. Bielefeld, Düsseldorf: Edition Marzona, 1989, ISBN 3-921420-36-9.
- Gottfried Jäger: Photo aesthetics. The theory of photography. Texts from the years 1965 to 1990. Munich: Publisher Laterna magica, 1991, ISBN 3-87467-466-5.
- Gottfried Jäger: Indices. Generative work 1967–1996. Three projects. Published by Claudia Gabriele Philipp on the occasion of the awarding of the David Octavius Hill Medal 1996 of the German Photographic Academy in conjunction with the Art Prize of the City of Leinfelden-Echterdingen. Bielefeld: Kerber publishing house, 1996, ISBN 3-924639-62-0.
- Gottfried Jäger, Gudrun Wessing (ed.): On lászló moholy-nagy. Results of the International László Moholy-Nagy-Symposium, Bielefeld, 1995. On the 100th birthday of the artist and Bauhaus teacher. Bielefeld: Kerber Verlag, 1997, ISBN 3-924639-77-9.
- Andreas Dress, Gottfried Jäger (ed.): Visualization in Mathematics, Science and Art. Basics and Applications. Braunschweig, Wiesbaden: Vieweg publishing house, 1999, ISBN 3-528-06912-0.
- Gottfried Jäger (ed.): Photography thinking. About Vilém Flusser's Philosophy of Media Modernity. Bielefeld: Kerber publishing house, 2001, ISBN 3-933040-42-6.
- Gottfried Jäger (ed.): The Art of Abstract Photography / The Art of Abstract Photography. Stuttgart, New York: Arnoldsche Art Publishers, 2002, ISBN 3-89790-015-7.
- Jörg Boström, Gottfried Jäger (ed.): Can photography capture our time in pictures? A Time Critical Record / Can Photography Capture our Time in Images? A time-critical balance. 25 Years Bielefeld Symposia on Photography and Media 1979-2004 / 25 Years Bielefeld Symposia about Photography and Media 1979–2004. Bielefeld: Kerber publishing house, 2004, ISBN 3-936646-69-4.
- Gottfried Jäger, Rolf H. Krauss, Beate Reese: Concrete Photography / Concrete Photography. Bielefeld: Kerber publishing house, 2005, ISBN 3-936646-74-0.
- Gottfried Jäger: Ernst Jäger. Photographer. Castle: Dorise Verlag, 2009, ISBN 978-3-937973-75-3.
- Martin Roman Deppner, Gottfried Jäger (ed.): Denkprozesse der Fotografie. 30 years of Bielefeld photo symposia 1979–2009. Contributions to image theory. Bielefeld: Kerber Verlag, 2010, ISBN 978-3-86678-366-9.
- Gottfried Jäger: Photomicrography as an obsession. The photographic work of Carl Strüwe (1898-1988). Dissertation. Bielefeld: Verlag für Druckgrafik Hans Gieselmann, 2011.

== Bibliography ==
- Herbert W. Franke: 'A bridge between art and technology: The apparatus graphics of Gottfried Jäger'. In: Magazin Kunst (Mainz), No. 1/1975, p. 123.
- Petr Tausk: 'Op Art and Photography. About pinhole structures by Gottfried Jäger.' In: The History of Photography in the 20th Century. Cologne: DuMont book publishing house, 1977, P. 165–166.
- Wolfgang Kemp: 'Gottfried Jäger: Generative Photography.' In: Theory of Photography III. 1945-1980. Munich: Schirmer / Mosel, 1983, pp. 458–460.
- Walter Koschatzky: 'Generative Photography. G. Jäger's principles lead to masterful achievements.' In: The Art of Photography. Technology, history, masterpieces. Salzburg, Vienna: Residenz Verlag, 1984, p. 367, 422–423. Reprint: dtb, 1987, pp. 260–261.
- Eric Renner: 'Pinhole Revival in Art: The 1960s and 1970s. Gottfried Jäger proclaims ...' In: Pinhole Photography. Rediscovering a Historic Technique. Boston, London: Focal Press, 1995, pp. 50–52.
- Gerhard Glüher: 'Blurred Contours, Whispering Contours'. In: NIKE New Art in Europe (Munich), No. 53/1995, pp. 36–37.
- Gerhard Glüher: Gottfried Jäger: photo-sculptural objects, Marburg 1989.
- Manfred Strecker: 'Photography becomes sheer art. The era of Gottfried Jägers at the Department of Design ends with the 25th Bielefeld Symposium on Photography and Media.' In: Neue Westfälische (Bielefeld), November 29, 2004.
- Anais Feyeux: La Generative Photography. Entre démon de l'exactitude et rage de histoire. In: Études photographiques. Revue semestrial. No. 18/2006, p. 52-71. Paris: Société Francaise de Photographie, ISBN 2-911961-18-8.
- Klaus Honnef: Gottfried Jäger. Imaging systems. Concrete photography. In: Gisela Burkamp (ed.): Kunstverein Oerlinghausen, Bielefeld: Kerber Verlag, 2006, pp. 52–57.
- Puglielli, Emidio (2006), An investigation of the relationship between the material and illusionary aspects of the photograph
- Andreas Krase: Gottfried Jäger. Pinhole structures and mosaics. In: ders. (Ed.): True-sign. Photography and Science, catalogue, Technical Collections / Museums of the City of Dresden, 2006, pp. 28–31.
- Andreas Beaugrand (ed.): Gottfried Jäger. Photography as a generative system. Pictures and texts 1960–2007. Bielefeld: Verlag für Druckgrafik Hans Gieselmann, 2007, ISBN 978-3-923830-60-2.
- Gudrun Wessing: An Experimental Photo Life. Gottfried Jäger has taken the limits of photography. In: TOP magazine Bielefeld, No. 4/2008, pp. 116–119.
- Maria Frickenstein: Alter Geist in neuer Kunst. Die Leidenschaft von Fotografie und Kunst liegt bei den Jägers in der Familie. Über Ausstellung und Buch Ernst Jäger, Fotograf in Burg, Neue Westfälische (Bielefeld), January 8, 2010.
- Jerzy Olek: Czysta Widzialnosc (About Gottfried Jäger, Interview with Numerous Fig.). In: artluck (Warszawa) 1st Quarter, No. 15/2010, pp. 20–25.
- Manuela De Leonardis: Intervista Gottfried Jäger (12 August 2010): Limmagine libera dell'occhio di bimbo. In: il manifesto. quotidiano comunista, 21 September 2010.
- Alexandra Holownia: Gottfried Jäger. In: foto wystawy, No. 7/2011, p. 16-19.

== Work in collections ==
- Museum of Arts and Crafts Hamburg (Lichtgrafiken zu H. Heißenbüttel).
- Sprengel Museum Hannover (Collection of Photography Käthe Schroeder).
- Städt. Museum Abteiberg Mönchengladbach (Etzold Collection: Program-Random-System).
- Kunsthalle Bielefeld (Graphic Collection).
- Fotomuseum in the Munich City Museum.
- George Eastman House Rochester, NY
- City Archives Leinfelden-Echterdingen (Collection German Photographic Academy).
- Museum Ludwig Cologne (Photographic Collection).
- Bibliothèque Nationale Paris (Photographic Collection).
- Schupmann Collection Söhrewald.
- Museum in Kulturspeicher Würzburg Peter C. Ruppert Collection, Concrete Art in Europe after 1945.
- Folkwang Museum Essen (Photographic Collection).
- Kunsthalle Bremen (Collection Herbert W. Franke, Paths to Computer Art).

== Literature about ==
- Contemporary Photographers, 2nd Edition. Chicago, London: St. James Press, 1988, pp. 496–498.
- Hans-Michael Koetzle: Encyclopaedia of Photographers 1900 to today. Munich: Knaur, 2002, pp. 218–219.
- Reinhold Mißelbeck (ed.): Prestel lexicon of photographers. From the beginnings of 1839 to the present. Munich et al.: Prestel, 2002, p. 127.
- Kürschner's Handbook of Fine Artists. Leipzig: KG Saur Verlag, 2007.
- Bernd Stiegler, Felix Thürlemann: masterpieces of photography, Stuttgart: Philipp Reclam jun., 2011, pp. 272–273.
