= Fotoform =

Fotoform was an avant-garde photography group founded in 1949 by six young German photographers, Siegfried Lauterwasser, Peter Keetman, Wolfgang Reisewitz, Toni Schneiders, Otto Steinert and Ludwig Windstoßer.

== Emergence ==
After WW2, the photographers of the 1920s and 1930s were inactive or at the end of their careers but for a few, including Carl Strüwe, Heinz Hajek- Halke, Martha Hoepffner, Herbert List, and Adolf Lazi who organised the first comprehensive post-war exhibit, Die Photographie 1948, held in a still partially destroyed public building in Stuttgart. He gave classes which enabled a group of young photographers to learn and exchange ideas. Peter Keetman, Ludwig Windstosser, Wolfgang Reisewitz and Siegfried Lauterwasser had exhibited in the show, and in 1949 were joined by Toni Schneiders and Otto Steinert and together they established the fotoform group. A shared and passionate interest in a new and unconventional photography suited to their time, required no written manifesto.

Otto Steinert was a natural leader who was to become director of the photography programme at the Staatliche Werkkunstschule in Saarbrücken (1954–59) and at the Folkwangschule in Essen (1959–78), and who was also the founder and curator of the photography collection at the Museum Folkwang and a founder of Photokina. It was he who suggested the title fotoform, the name to be purposely be written in lowercase letters, as Steinert did for the subjektive fotografie exhibition title.

== Ethos ==
fotoform was a secession from mainstream, realist post-war photography in West Germany, driven by a desire to reconnect to photographic tendencies of the 1920s and early 1930s, and thus to draw attention to the creative possibilities of photography which had been extinguished by the propagandistic Nazi cultural policy. Otto Steinert asserted that “a new photographic style is one of the demands of our times,” but also consciously resurrected Bauhaus principles, as exemplified in his X-ray-like photogram Strenges Ballet, Hommage à Oskar Schlemmer of 1949/1950. The group's name is a clear reference to its adherence to formalism, obtained through unusual framings or viewpoints, subverting technical aspects of focus and exposure or by manipulation of darkroom processes, while their commitment to subjektive photography is a departure from 'objectivity', and a new direction toward personal expression; as Steinert explained; “subjective photography means humanised, individualised photography and implies the handling of a camera in order to win from the single object the views expressive of its character.” Subjective meant free, personal, non-functional practice.

The radical artist Chargesheimer (pseudonym of Karl-Heinz Hargesheimer) having studied graphics and photography at the Cologne Werkschulen (1942–43) and at the Bavarian State Institute for Photography in Munich (1943–44), and pursuing his interest in theatre from 1947 as a freelance photographer for various playhouses in Germany, encountered fotoform and in 1950 participated in their “photo-kino” exhibition in Cologne and also in their legendary exhibitions of “subjektive fotografie” in 1952 and 1954. In 1953 Heinz Hajek-Halke and Christer Christian (the pseudonym of the Swedish photographer Christer Strömholm) joined the group. The photographers of fotoform were concerned with the formed single image and only photographs which had been accepted by all members of the group were validated as fotoform photography.

== Style ==
This group of young photographers, founded in 1949 by Peter Keetman, Otto Steinert, and Ludwig Windstosser was the nucleus of modernism in that country and especially what was called in ‘subjective photography’ to contrast with the ‘new objectivity’ of the pre-war period. Though it focused on abstraction, design, and close observation, it also fostered new approaches to photo-documentary imagery. By concentrating on details, by cropping, by using sharp contrasts and by choosing extreme perspectives the photographers of the fotoform group concentrated on the graphical properties of black and white photography, often taking their experiments so far as to create almost abstract images. Their artistic strategies included photomontage, photograms, solarisation, negative printing and luminograms among others.

== Prominence ==
In 1950, the fotoform group had its first spectacular appearance at the Photokina (then called Photo-Kino). Already in 1951, fotoform member Otto Steinert included works by all fotoform photographers in his exhibition subjektive fotografie in Saarbrücken, Germany. Under this title the German avant-garde photography of the 1950s reconnected to international trends in international photography.

== Exhibitions ==
- fotoform, Photo-Kino Ausstellung, Cologne, Germany 1950
- fotoform, Circolo fotografico Milanese, Milan, Italy 1950
- 10e Internationale tentonstelling van fotokunst, Focus Salon, Amsterdam, Netherlands 1950
- III. Internationale Kunstphoto Ausstellung, Österreichischer Lichtbildnerbund, Salzburg, Austria 1950
- fotoform, Amerikahaus, Darmstadt, Germany 1950
- fotoform, Werkkunstschule, Wuppertal, Germany 1950
- fotoform, Photokina, Cologne, Germany 1951
- subjektive fotografie, Staatliche Schule für Kunst und Handwerk, Saarbrücken, Germany 1951 and other locations
- Segunda Exposicao mundial de arte fotografica, Rio de Janeiro, Brasil 1951
- Unione Fotografico. Mostra della Fotografia Europea, palazzo di Brera, Milan, Italy 1951
- Weltausstellung der Photographie, Kunstmuseum Luzern, Luzern, Austria 1952
- subjektive fotografie 2, Photokina, Cologne, Germany 1953 and other locations
- subjektive fotografie 3, Photokina, Cologne, Germany 1958 and other locations
- Section in the exhibition 2019/2020: Ludwig Windstosser. Fotografie der Nachkriegsmoderne, Museum für Fotografie, Berlin

== Bibliography ==
- Ute Eskildsen (Ed.): Subjektive Fotografie – Bilder der 50er Jahre, Folkwang Verlag, Essen 1984
- F. C. Gundlach (Ed.): fotoform / Peter Keetman, Nishen, Berlin 1988
- ifa (Institut für Auslandsbeziehungen) (Ed.): subjektive fotografie. Der deutsche Beitrag 1948 - 1963, Stuttgart 1989
- Rainer K. Wick (Ed.): Das Neue Sehen. Von der Fotografie am Bauhaus zur Subjektiven Fotografie, Munich 1991
- Ulrich Domröse (Ed.): Positionen künstlerischer Photographie in Deutschland seit 1945, Cologne 1997
- Karl Steinorth: Wie kam es zur Gründung der Gruppe fotoform?, in: PhotoPresse No 24 1999
- Gottfried Jäger: Die Kunst der abstrakten Fotografie, Stuttgart 2002
- Karl Steinorth: The pioneers of fotoform, in: Photoresearcher No 7 2004
