= Stefan Moses =

German photographer (1928–2018)

Stefan Moses (29 August 1928 – 3 February 2018) was a German photographer living in Munich.

== Life ==
Born in Legnica, Province of Lower Silesia, Moses was forced to leave school in 1943 because of his Jewish heritage and survived a forced labour camp. After training as a photographer in Wrocław shortly after the end of World War II, he worked as a theatre photographer at the Deutsches Nationaltheater und Staatskapelle Weimar. From 1950, he lived in Munich, where he first became known for his reportages for the Stern. His documentary portraits of people and professions in West Germany (Germans) and later in East Germany (Farewell and Beginnings) made him accessible to a large audience. Moses took people out of their working environment and photographed them in front of a grey linen cloth - thus creating contemporary documents. Stefan Moses also created portraits of numerous personalities such as Thomas Mann, Ilse Aichinger, Erich Kästner, Peggy Guggenheim, Theodor W. Adorno, Otto Dix, Max Frisch or Martin Mayer. An exhibition of his life's work has been on display in various European cities since 2003. In 2017, the grand seigneur of German portrait photography, bequeathed 158 large-format portraits of German emigrants to the Stiftung Exilmuseum Berlin. These were taken between 1947 and 2003. Stefan Moses was married to the artist Else Bechteler-Moses.

== Awards ==
- 1990: David Octavius Hill Medal
- 1991: Cultural Honor Prize of the City of Munich
- 1994: Member of the Bayerische Akademie der Schönen Künste in Munich.
- 2001: Ehrenpreis der Stankowski Stiftung
- 2004: Order of Merit of the Federal Republic of Germany (I. Klasse)
- 2014: Lovis Corinth Prize

== Publications ==
- Manuel. Wegner, Hamburg 1967.
- Transsibirische Eisenbahn. Prestel, München 1979.
- Deutsche. Portraits der Sechziger Jahre. Prestel, München 1980.
- Abschied und Anfang – Ostdeutsche Porträts. Hatje Cantz, Ostfildern 1991.
- Das Tier und sein Mensch. Sanssouci Verlag, München 1997.
- Jeder Mensch ist eine kleine Gesellschaft. Prestel, München 1998.
- DDR – Ende mit Wende: 200 Photographien 1989–1990. Hatje Cantz, Ostfildern 1999, ISBN 978-3-7757-9005-5.
- Stefan Moses. Schirmer/Mosel, 2002.
- Ilse Aichinger. Ein Bilderbuch von Stefan Moses. S. Fischer, Frankfurt am Main 2006.
- Die sich die Freiheit nahmen. Photographs by Wilfried Bauer, Robert Lebeck, Stefan Moses, Christian G. Irrgang. Damm und Lindlar Verlag, 2008. (Portraits of Ilse Aichinger, Sarah Kirsch and Rose Ausländer.)
- Deutschlands Emigranten. 2013. Text: Christoph Stölzl. Nimbus Verlag, Wädenswil 2013, ISBN 978-3-907142-85-1.
- Begegnungen mit Peggy Guggenheim. Elisabeth Sandmann Verlag, 2017, ISBN 978-3-945543-34-4. (Vergl.: Peggy Guggenheim.)

== Solo exhibitions ==
- 1980: Museum Folkwang.
- 2003–2005: Retrospektive. Fotomuseum in Munich Stadtmuseum Kunsthalle Kiel; Willy-Brandt-Haus Berlin; Friedrich-Hundt-Gesellschaft in Stadtmuseum Münster; Kunstverein Ludwigshafen; State Museum for Art and Cultural History Oldenburg; Rheinisches Landesmuseum Bonn; Kunstmuseum Moritzburg Halle (Saale); Deutsches Hygiene-Museum Dresden.
- 2007: Ilse Aichinger – Fotografien von Stefan Moses. Literaturhaus Salzburg
- 2008: Stefan Moses – Münchner Leben. Münchner Stadtmuseum
- 2012: Stefan Moses – Emigranten. Johanna Breede, Berlin January
- 2013: Stefan Moses – Deutschlands Emigranten. Bayerische Akademie der Schönen Künste, Munich
- 2015: Stefan Moses. Lovis Corinth Prize 2014. Bayerische Akademie der Schönen Künste, Regensburg
- 2016: Stefan Moses – Ein Welttheater. Johanna Breede, Berlin
- 2017: Stefan Moses – Blumenkinder. Literaturhaus München
- 2018: Stefan Moses – Künstler. Johanna Breede Photokunst, Berlin
- 2019: Das exotische Land Deutsches Historisches Museum
- 2020: das Tier und sein Mensch. Johanna Breede Photokunst, Berlin

== Group exhibitions ==
- 2011: Portraits in Serie. Museum für Kunst und Gewerbe Hamburg
- 2013: Kleiden – Verkleiden. Museum Folkwang
- 2014: Barbara Klemm/Stefan Moses. Museum Küppersmühle für Moderne Kunst, Duisburg
- 2016: Aufbrüche – Bilder aus Deutschland. Willy-Brandt-Haus, Berlin
- 2017: Franz Hitzler/Stefan Moses. Künstlerhaus Marktoberdorf
- 2017: Blicke, die bleiben. Fotografische Porträts aus der Sammlung Fricke. Suermondt-Ludwig-Museum, Aachen
