= Mike Jackson (photographer) =

British artist

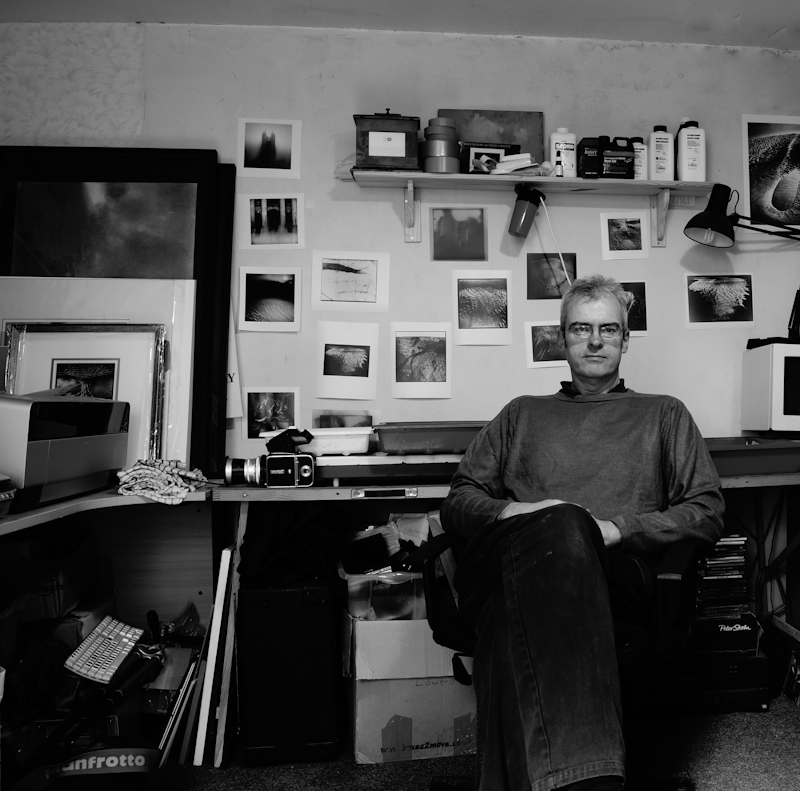
Image of Mike Jackson

Mike Jackson (born 1966) is a British artist based in Dorset, England.

He works in a traditional darkroom, using unique cameraless techniques often involving the luminogram process.

His book ‘Flatland’ was published by 21st Editions In 2018

His work is in the collection of The National Gallery Of Art in Washington
