= Paul Halke =

German artist and illustrator

Paul Halke (1866, Bukowiec - 1924) was a German artist and illustrator.

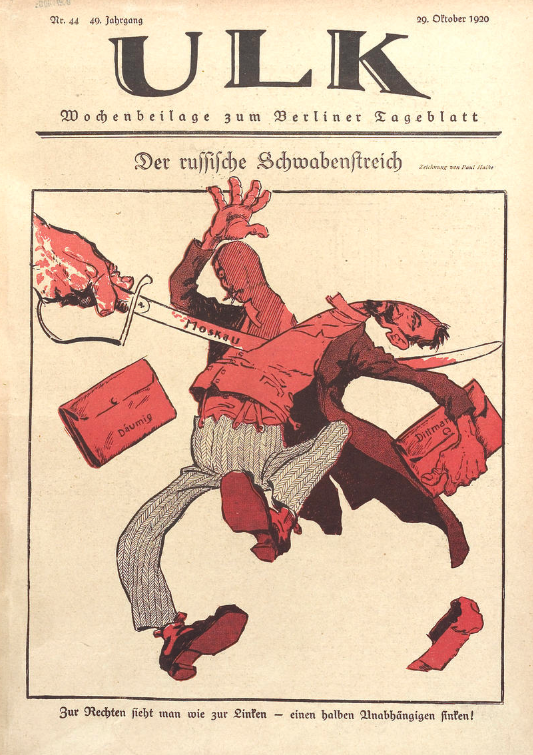
Cover of Ulk, October 1920 with drawing by Paul Halke

He exhibited in the Große Berliner Kunstausstellung (the “Grand Berlin Art Exhibition”) in 1894 and 1914.

His son, the photographer Heinz Hajek-Halke, was born in Berlin in 1898. After spending several years in Argentina, Paul's son returned to Germany in 1911, where he was taught drawing by Paul.
