= Cultural Honor Prize of the City of Munich =

German cultural award

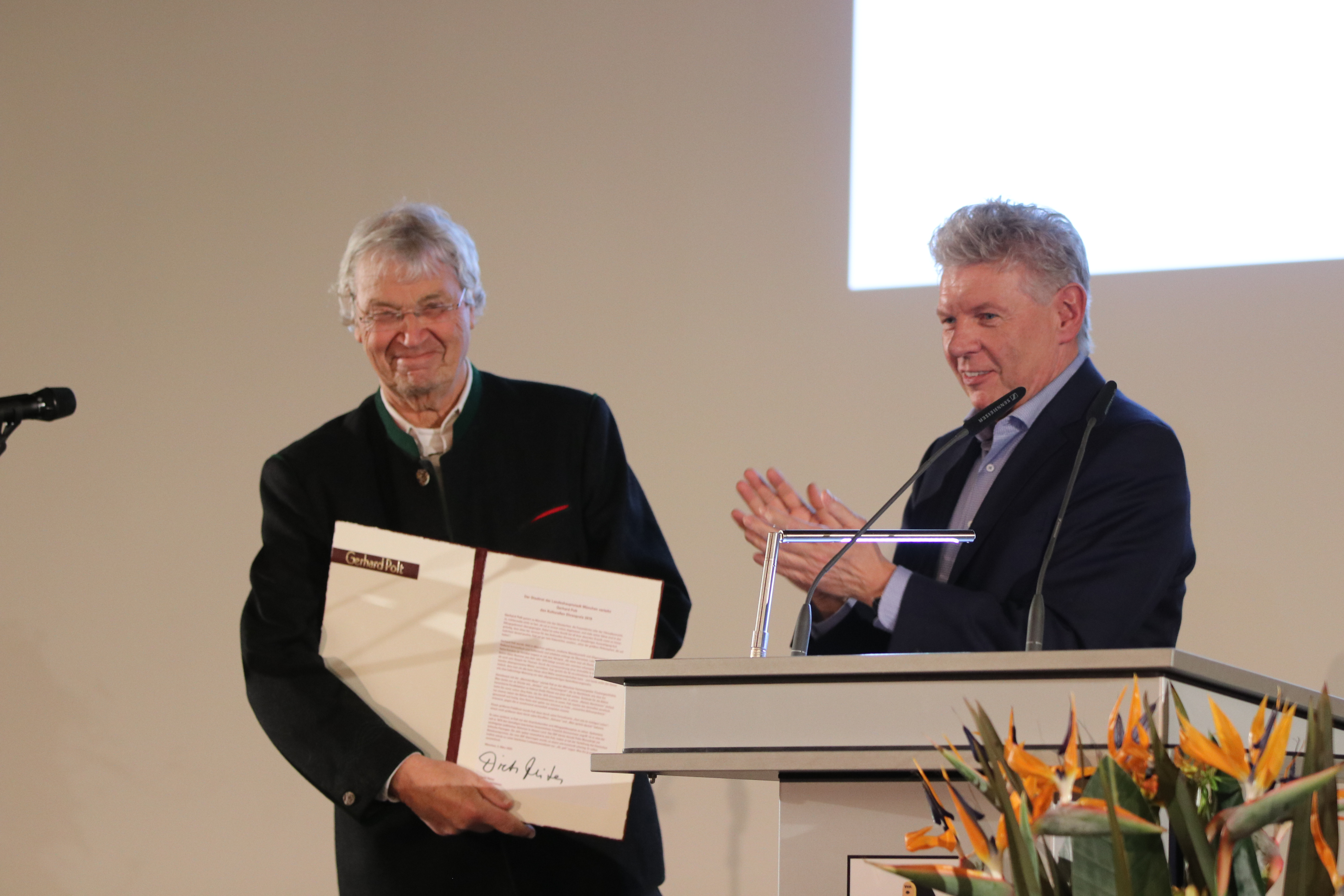
Mayor Dieter Reiter presents the 2019 Cultural Honor Prize of the City of Munich to Gerhard Polt

The Cultural Honor Prize of the City of Munich (German: Kultureller Ehrenpreis der Landeshauptstadt München) is a cultural award presented annually by the City of Munich since 1958. The award is endowed with 10,000 euros. The prize is given to "a personality of international renown for their cultural or scientific achievements. A close connection to Munich is also essential." The jury consists of the mayor, the head of the Cultural Affairs Department, the previous year's prizewinner if applicable, five members of the city council, and five independent expert jurors.

== Recipients ==
- 1958: Werner Heisenberg
- 1959: Bruno Walter
- 1960: Martin Buber
- 1961: Karl Schmidt-Rottluff
- 1962: Fritz Kortner
- 1963: Mies van der Rohe
- 1964: Anna Freud
- 1965: Carl Orff
- 1966: Emil Preetorius
- 1967: Adolf Butenandt
- 1968: Michelangelo Antonioni
- 1969: Gertrud von Le Fort
- 1970: Erich Kästner
- 1971: Wilhelm Hoegner
- 1972: Werner Egk
- 1973: Alexander Mitscherlich
- 1974: Toni Stadler junior
- 1975: Willi Daume
- 1976: Max Spindler
- 1977: Heinz Rühmann
- 1978: Carlos Kleiber
- 1979: Karl Rahner
- 1980: Golo Mann
- 1981: Peter Lühr
- 1982: Wolfgang Koeppen
- 1983: Wolfgang Sawallisch
- 1984: Josef Henselmann
- 1985: Maria Nicklisch
- 1986: Alexander Kluge
- 1987: Günter Bialas
- 1988: August Everding
- 1989: Rupprecht Geiger
- 1990: Konstanze Vernon
- 1991: Stefan Moses
- 1992: Edgar Reitz
- 1993: Dieter Dorn
- 1994: Hans Magnus Enzensberger
- 1995: Hans Werner Henze
- 1996: Ulrich Beck
- 1997: Joachim Kaiser
- 1998: Rachel Salamander
- 1999: Rolf Boysen
- 2000: Michael Krüger
- 2001: Anne-Sophie Mutter
- 2002: Doris Dörrie
- 2003: Peter Jonas
- 2004: Manfred Eicher
- 2005: Tankred Dorst und Ursula Ehler
- 2006: Ernst Maria Lang
- 2007: Vicco von Bülow (Loriot)
- 2008: Dietrich Fischer-Dieskau
- 2009: Frank Baumbauer
- 2010: Dieter Hildebrandt
- 2011: Senta Berger
- 2012: Jürgen Habermas
- 2013: Uwe Timm
- 2014: Werner Herzog
- 2015: Herlinde Koelbl
- 2016: Klaus Doldinger
- 2017: Günter Rohrbach
- 2018: Antje Kunstmann
- 2019: Gerhard Polt
- 2020: Hanna Schygulla
- 2021: Ingvild Goetz
- 2022: Julia Fischer
- 2023: Michael Brenner
- 2024: Lothar Schirmer
- 2025: Dagmar Nick
