= Anni Schaad =

German jewellery maker (1911–1988)

Anni Schaad (born Lang; 10 December 1911 – 20 December 1988) founded the German jewelry making company langani.

== Biography ==
Schaad was born in Stuttgart, the daughter of the painter and designer Paul Lang and the textile designer Minna Lang-Kurz. Her sister, the renowned fashion photographer Regina Relang, provided many of the most iconic images of langani jewelry. Anni Schaad was married to the German director editor, Rudolf Schaad.

Schaad studied at the Kunstgewerbeschule in Stuttgart and in Vienna at the Wiener Werkstätte with Josef Hoffmann. In 1952, she founded a jewellery company, which she eventually named "langani", a combination of her given and maiden names. Her first commercial success came at the 1952 Frankfurt Fair. Between 1969 and 1989 she worked with Louis Feraud, Paris, and designed the jewelry for his haute couture and ready-to-wear fashion shows. langani continues to produce fashion jewelry in Stuttgart, Germany.

Schaad is said to have invented the "floating bead" technique in which beads are strung on nylon threads so that they appear to be dancing on the skin, but no patent was ever filed. She died in Stuttgart.
