= Ulk =

German satirical magazine

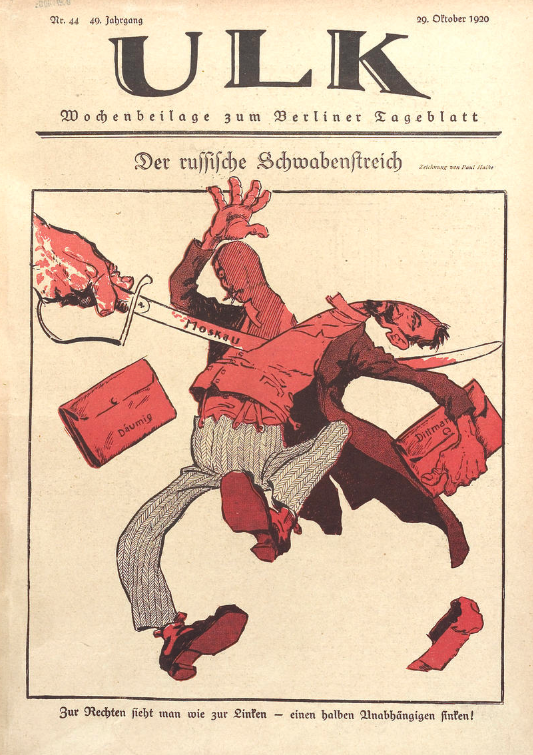
Cover of Ulk, October 1920 with drawing by Paul Halke

The German language satirical magazine Ulk was printed from 1872 until 1933 by the publisher Rudolf Mosse. Its headquarters was in Berlin, Germany.

Initially it was an independent weekly paper as Wochenblatt für Humor und Satire. It was a supplement to the Berliner Tageblatt, and the Berliner Volks-Zeitung, both published by Mosse.

Contributors to the Ulk included Hans Reimann, Kurt Tucholsky, Lyonel Feininger, Heinrich Zille, and Hans Holtzbecher.
