= Hans Holtzbecher =

German painter

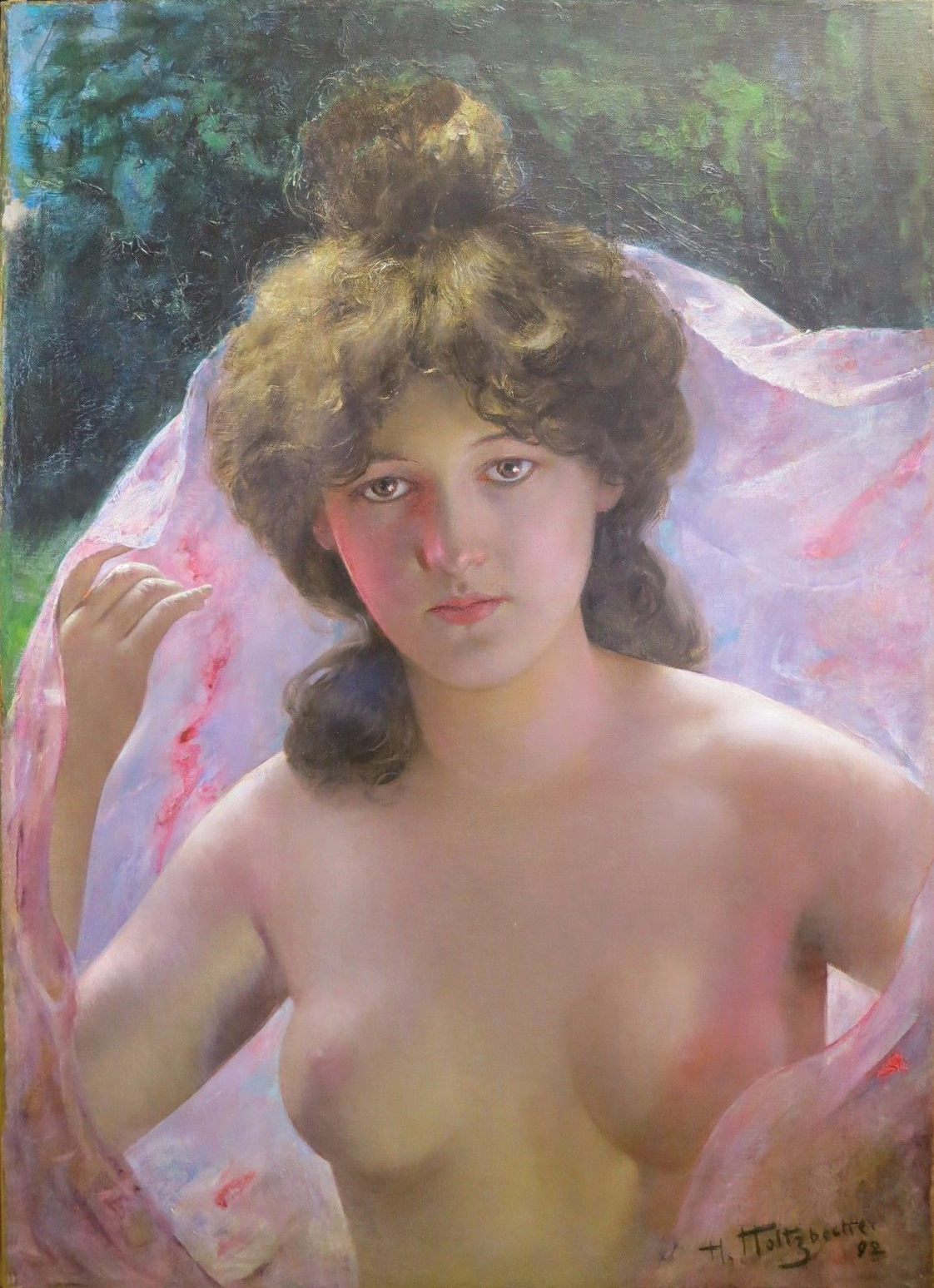
Female Nude (1892)

Friedrich Emmerich Theodor Johann Daniel Holtzbecher (1861–1935), called Hans, was a German painter and illustrator.

== Life ==
Holtzbecher was born in Berlin on 22 February 1861. He was a student at the Prussian Academy of Arts from 1877 to 1884 under Paul Thumann, Otto Knille and Max Michael, and made study trips to Holland, Paris and Italy.

He made his debut in Berlin c. 1887. He painted portraits, nudes and genre scenes. He exhibited at the Berlin Academy of Arts in 1884, 1888, 1889 and 1890.

From 1885 to 1890 he was also active as an illustrator, and provided numerous caricatures for the Berlin magazine Ulk.

He died in Berlin on 23 June 1935, aged 64.
