= Heiner Blum =

German painter

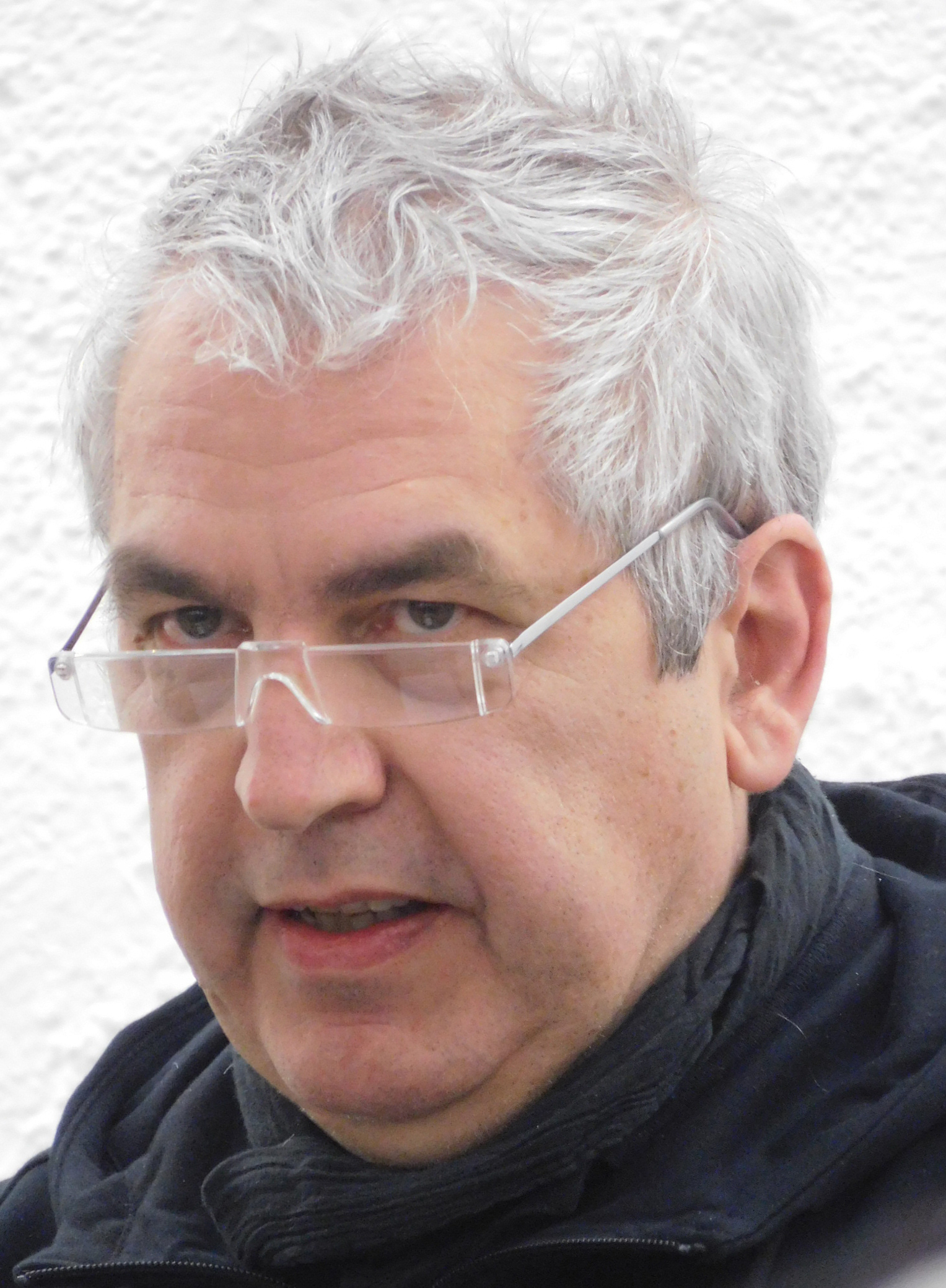
Heiner Blum, 2018

Heiner Blum (born 4 February 1959 in Stuttgart) is a German conceptual artist. Since 1997, he has been a professor for experimental spatial concepts at the Hochschule für Gestaltung Offenbach am Main.

== Biography ==
Heiner Blum studied visual communication at the Kassel University of Applied Sciences from 1977 to 1983. After studying until 1998, he worked as a photographer for magazines such as Art, Geo, Stern and the Frankfurter Allgemeine Magazin. In 1981, he received the Otto Steinert Prize from the German Society for Photography and began his own artistic productions. His 205-part series of works on paper entitled Alarm, created between 1982 and 1983, is now in the collection of the Museum für Moderne Kunst Frankfurt am Main.

From 1991 to 1992, Blum taught interior design at the Trier University of Applied Sciences, and in 1996 he was a visiting professor at the Bremen University of the Arts. Since 1998 he has been a professor for design principles and experimental spatial concepts in the visual communication department at the Offenbach University of Design. Between 2000 and 2003 he developed a cross-genre, experimental club concept in the Bockenheimer Depot in Frankfurt entitled Schmalklub together with students and the dramaturge Steve Valk under the aegis of William Forsythe. “The Schmalklub was not a theatre, a party, an exhibition, an event, an installation, or a performance. He was a piece of life".

In 2008, a Norbert Wollheim Memorial designed by Blum and named after Norbert Wollheim (1913–1998), a survivor of the Buna/Monowitz concentration camp, was opened on the campus of the Johann Wolfgang Goethe University in Frankfurt. Blum's concept consists of the interior and exterior design of the pavilion and photo panels in the university park. Above the door of the pavilion, which used to serve as a guard house, Wollheim's prisoner number is written in large brass letters. Inside is the wall inscription "We are saved, but we are not delivered. Norbert Wollheim, August 26, 1945” and two monitors on which survivors of the concentration camp report on their childhood and youth in video interviews.
