= Pepa Hristova =

Bulgarian photographer (born 1977)

Pepa Hristova (born 1977) is a Bulgarian photographer, based in Hamburg and Berlin.

== Early life and education ==
Hristova was born in Sevlievo, Bulgaria. She has a degree in communication design with a specialization in photography from the Hamburg University of Applied Sciences.

== Photography ==
She became a member of the Ostkreuz photographic agency in Berlin in 2006.

== Exhibitions ==
- Stranger World, Stadtmuseum Munich, FotoDoks, 2013

== Publications ==
- Strangers in Their Own Country. Berlin: Talents 11, 2008.
- 24 Stunden Berlin. Göttingen: Steidl, 2009.
- The City. Becoming and decaying. Stuttgart: Hatje Cantz, 2010.
- The Other Side. Heidelberg: Kehrer, 2012.
- State of the Art Photography. Düsseldorf: Richter & Fey, 2012.
- On Borders. Stuttgart: Hatje Cantz, 2012. ISBN 978-3-7757-3431-8. With essays by Andrea Böhm, Wolfgang Büscher, Fabian Dietrich, Anna-Christina Hartmann, and Marcus Jauer.
- Sworn Virgins. Heidelberg: Kehrer, 2013. ISBN 978-3-86828-347-1.
