= Joakim Eskildsen =

Danish art photographer (born 1971)

- Born: 1971 (age 54–55); Copenhagen, Denmark
- Education: University of Art and Design Helsinki
- Occupation: Art Photographer

Joakim Eskildsen (born 1971) is a Danish art photographer.

== Career as a photographer ==
Eskildsen was born in 1971 in Copenhagen. He was a pupil of Rigmor Mydtskov in Copenhagen and went to Finland in 1994 to study photographic book making with Pentti Sammallahti at the University of Art and Design Helsinki. He lives near Copenhagen and has exhibited some of his works in Europe (including Germany, Denmark, Finland, Sweden, France, England, Italy), China, and South Africa.

From 2000 to 2006, together with the writer Cia Rinne, Eskildsen sought out Romani in various (mainly Eastern European) countries and other ethnic groups in India who may be related to the Roma. The fruits of this work have culminated in the book The Roma Journeys, which provides insight into the life of the Roma through its text and more than 200 photographs.

== Awards ==
- Photo-Eye Books & Print Annual Award, 2000 (Best Foreign Title, for iChickenMoon)
- Amilcare Ponchielli Prize, 2008
- Deutscher Fotobuchpreis, 2009 (Gold, for The Roma Journeys)
- Prize of the Otto Pankok Foundation, 2009 (for The Roma Journeys)
- David Octavius Hill Medal, 2009 (by the Deutsche Fotografische Akademie)

== Publications ==
- Nordtegn / Nordic Signs. Opus 29. Helsinki: Taideteollinen Korkeakoulu, Valokuvataiteen laitos, 1995. OCLC 81635801. (in Danish and English)
- Meknès (1997)
- Traer (1997)
- Blue Tide: A True Story / Maré Azul: uma história verdadeira. Opus 33. Helsinki: Taideteollinen Korkeakoulu, Valokuvataiteen laitos, 1997. ISBN 952-90-8814-0. (in English and Portuguese) With Cia Rinne.
- A Voyage to iChickenMoon. Suomen valokuvataiteen museon julkaisuja, 7. Helsinki: Suomen Valokuvataineen Museo (Finnish Museum of Photography), 1999. ISBN 951-9086-57-9. Includes CD. With Cia Rinne and Sebastian Eskildsen. "Part of Shuttle 99, a Nordic-South African cultural exchange"; "Opus 38".
- al-Madina (with Pentti Sammallahti and Kristoffer Albrecht, 2002)
- The Roma Journeys. Göttingen: Steidl, 2007. ISBN 3-86521-371-5. (in German and English) Text: Cia Rinne. Preface: Günter Grass.
  - Roma-rejserne. Copenhagen: Kunsthallen Nikolaj, 2007. (in Danish)
  - Die Romareisen. Göttingen: Steidl, 2009. ISBN 3-86521-429-0. (in German)
