= Erna Lendvai-Dircksen =

German photographer (1883–1962)

- Born: Erna Katherina Wilhelmine Dircksen; 31 May 1883; Wetterburg, Waldeck, German Empire
- Died: 8 May 1962 (aged 78); Coburg, Bavaria, West Germany
- Occupation: Photographer

Erna Lendvai-Dircksen (born Erna Katherina Wilhelmine Dircksen, 31 May 1883 – 8 May 1962) was a German photographer known for a series of volumes of portraits of rural individuals from throughout Germany. During the Third Reich, she also photographed for eugenicist publications and was commissioned to document the new Autobahn and the workers constructing it.

== Career ==
Born in Wetterburg, now part of Bad Arolsen, Erna Dircksen studied painting at the Kunsthochschule Kassel from 1903 to 1905, and photography at the Lette-Verein from 1910 to 1911. She may have opened a photographic studio in Hellerau, near Dresden, in 1913. From 1916 to 1943, she had a portrait studio in Berlin. By 1918 she had a growing reputation, particularly for her nude photography, and was increasingly using a highly realistic style. Already in 1911, she had become interested in portraying the country people of Germany, after accidentally photographing a blacksmith and a farmer while on holiday. In her writings she later expressed a highly romantic view of rural life and contempt for urban life. Beginning in 1917, she made a series of photo-portraits of Germans of different regions, a selection of which won first prize at an exhibition in Frankfurt in 1926. On the strength of this she was able to publish some of them in the Berliner Illustrirte Zeitung in 1930.

=== Das deutsche Volksgesicht ===
Lendvai-Dircksen published her portraits of rural Germans as Das deutsche Volksgesicht (The Face of the German Volk) in 1932. It was continued in multiple volumes portraying different regions of the Reich beginning in 1942, both under that title and as Das germanische Volksgesicht (The Face of the Germanic Volk), now including volumes on, for example, Flanders and Norway.

=== Autobahn ===
Under the Third Reich she received state commissions, notably one from Fritz Todt for portraits of Autobahn construction workers, originally commissioned for the Schaffendes Volk exhibition of 1937 as part of Todt's effort to have the best photographers in the Reich artistically reproduce the new autobahn. Todt specifically required her to "photographically [depict] the visages of his Reich autobahn workers from the various regions of the Fatherland". The book appeared in 1937 and in a revised edition in 1942. Presumably Todt chose her on the basis of her work in Das deutsche Volksgesicht, and the autobahn book follows a similar plan, following the course of the construction from North Germany south into the Alps, and in each region following illustrations of the landscape and the autobahn, especially the bridges, with depictions of local men working on the project. Her pictures of the new bridges emphasise the stonework and the aesthetics of the arches, in some cases using compositional techniques reminiscent of New Objectivity, in others situating the gigantic constructions in nature and in tradition, suggesting their lengthy future existence; in one image, a farmer ploughing with a team of oxen is shown beneath an autobahn bridge. Those of the workers, which dominate the book, heroicise them by depicting them individually, in tight close-up and from beneath; she makes use of the "cult of the beautiful body" as in Leni Riefenstahl's Olympia. Only occasionally does she pose them looking at the camera, and she rarely shows their tools and then only as illustrations of strength or elements of the composition; she also emphasises hand-work, giving the impression the autobahn was built using very little heavy machinery. Captions such as "After years of unemployment, I am once again earning honest bread for seven sons and a daughter" emphasise the importance of the autobahn as a means of reducing unemployment, and ignore the reality of forced labour and the bad conditions in the workers' camps reported by eyewitnesses in favour of the propaganda message.

=== Volk und Rasse ===
She was also the main photographer of children for the eugenicist periodical Volk und Rasse, posing them in traditional dress and under harsh lighting to clearly capture their desirable racial characteristics.

=== Later career ===
In 1943, to escape the bombing of Berlin, she moved to Upper Silesia; in 1945 she lost her archives fleeing from there, and settled in Coburg, where from the 1950s she began to concentrate on landscape photography in colour. Her postwar work is housed in the Agfa Foto-Historama in Cologne.

=== Exhibitions and honours ===
In addition to the Frankfurt show in 1926 at which she won first prize, Lendvai-Dircksen's portraits were exhibited at the Pressa in Cologne in 1928, and a touring exhibition of the series visited various German cities beginning in autumn 1933. The same year, she was accorded a special exhibition in Erfurt by the Gesellschaft Deutscher Lichtbildner (Society of German Photographers, predecessor of the Deutsche Fotografische Akademie). After the war she exhibited in Coburg and Stuttgart in 1953 and in Cologne in 1958, and landscapes by her were featured at the Cologne Photo-kina in 1960. The Gesellschaft Deutscher Lichtbildner awarded her their highest honour, the David Octavius Hill Medal, in 1958.

== Critical reception ==
Lendvai-Dircksen's portraits of farmers suited the Nazi ethos except that in her initial publication, almost all her subjects were old, and indeed she clearly portrayed the damage to their bodies as a sign of authenticity. She later widened her focus to include children. She never, however, photographed sport, whether for technical reasons or because of her personal philosophy.

Although Lendvai-Dircksen has been referred to as "brown Erna" for the promotion of Nazi ideals in her work under the Third Reich, her portrait photography can be compared to the work of Dorothea Lange or Walker Evans as documentation of impoverished people, and Margaret Bourke-White also photographed labourers in a heroic light. As pointed out by Berlin photographic curator Janos Frecot in the catalogue of an exhibition at the Albertina which included her work, her portraits and those of others at the time can be seen as applications of the same ethnographic principle as portraits of people in faraway cultures; similarly, Leesa Rittelmann has shown that the same principle of characterising a country by the physiognomies of its people, although a throwback to 19th-century theories, was shared by Weimar-era photographers such as the progressive August Sander, in his Antlitz der Zeit (Face of Our Time).

== Private life ==
Dircksen was married from 1906 to 1910 to Adolf Göschel, with whom she had a daughter, and from 1913 to 1924 to the Hungarian composer Erwin Lendvai. She died in 1962 in Coburg.

== Selected publications ==
Lendvai-Dircksen published at least twenty photographic albums which sold some 250,000 copies and of which at least six were reprinted. These included:

- Das deutsche Volksgesicht. Berlin: Kulturelle Verlagsgesellschaft, 1932. OCLC 21285189
- Unsere deutschen Kinder. Text by Paul Seelhoff. Berlin: Schönfeld, 1932. OCLC 72575514
- Das Gesicht des deutschen Ostens. Berlin: Zeitgeschichte, [1935]. OCLC 849121
- Bergmenschen. Deutsche Meisteraufnahmen 4. Munich: Bruckmann, 1936. OCLC 40759744
- Nordseemenschen. Deutsche Meisteraufnahmen 9. Munich: Bruckmann, 1937. OCLC 10871953
- Arbeit Formt das Gesicht. Aus dem Archiv der Henschel Flugzeug-Werke AG. 1938.
- Reichsautobahn. Mensch und Werk. Gedichte und Sprüche [Verses and epigrams], Emil Maier. Generalinspektor für das deutsche Straßenwesen. Berlin: Volk und Reich, 1937. OCLC 25661376
- Reichsautobahn. Mensch und Werk. 99 Aufnahmen. 2nd ed. Worte und Gedichte [Words and verses], Emil Maier-Dorn. Geleitwort [Forward], General-Inspektor für das deutsche Straßenwesen Dr.-Ing. Fritz Todt. Bayreuth: Gauverlag, 1942. OCLC 123480938
- Das deutsche Volksgesicht / Das germanische Volksgesicht. Bayreuth: Gauverlag, multiple volumes, 1942–44.
- Das deutsche Volksgesicht: ein Bildwerk in 145 Bildnissen von Erna Lendvai-Dircksen. Selection ed. Helmut Schröcke. Tübingen: Grabert, 2003. ISBN 9783878472001
- Urgestalt in Kreide und Granit: in zwei Bildkapiteln. Essen: Burkhard-Verlag Heyer, 1960. OCLC 313248644
- Ein deutsches Menschenbild; Antlitz des Volkes. Frankfurt: Umschau, 1961. OCLC 15013080

She published an essay on her approach to photography:

- "Zur Psychologie des Sehens". Das Deutsche Lichtbild 1931 (n.p.) (in German)
