= Regina Relang =

German photographer (1906–1989)

Regina Relang (1906–1989) was a German fashion photographer and photojournalist active in the 1930s and 1960s. She documented the latest designs of prominent fashion houses.

== Biography ==
Relang (born Regina Lang) was born in Stuttgart in 1906, daughter of painter Paul Lang and textile designer Minna Lang-Kurz. Her younger sister was the jewelry designer Anni Schaad. Relang studied painting at the Kunstakademie Stuttgart and the Academy of Arts, Berlin. Her introduction to the world of fashion came after she befriended fashion photographer Willy Maywald and moved to Paris.

Relang began working for Vogue in 1938, publishing photographs in the French, American, and British editions. Her work was also regularly used in Die Dame, Elegante Welt, Madame, Harper's Bazaar, Film und Frau, and Constanze. Over the course of her career, she photographed the women's fashion of Christian Dior, Pierre Cardin, and Yves Saint-Laurent and reported on haute couture shows from Paris and Rome. Her photographs are known for their elegance, glamour, and use of lifelike settings that contrast with the designs being showcased. Models photographed by Relang include Jean Patchett, Linda Morand, Ina Balke, Isa Stoppi, Elsa Martinelli, Simone D'Aillencourt, and Suzy Parker.

Relang was awarded the Federal Cross of Merit in 1972 and the David Octavius Hill Medal in 1973. She died in Munich in 1989.

== Collections ==
- Munich Stadtmuseum
- Ludwiggalerie Schloss Oberhausen
- Getty Museum
- Historisches Museum (Frankfurt)

== Recent exhibitions ==
- Lo Sguardo Italiano: Fashion photographs from 1951 to today, Fondazione Pitti Discovery, 2005
- Vanity, National Museum, Kraków, 2013
- Rich Pickings: Displaying Wealth, Museum für Kunst und Gewerbe Hamburg, 2014
- Who's Afraid of Women Photographers, Musée d'Orsay, 2015
- Silk gowns and leather jackets: The fashion studio of Erika Segel-Reinhardt, Historical Museum, Frankfurt, 2015
- Regina Relang: Staging Elegance: Fashion and photojournalism from 1930 to 1980, Ludwiggalerie Schloss Oberhausen, 2016
- The Invention of Press Photography: From the Ullstein Collection 1894–1945, Deutsches Historisches Museum, 2017

== Publications ==
- The Elegant World of Regina Relang. Berlin: Hatje Cantz, 2005. ISBN 9783775715881, 296 pages, German and English.
