= Erwin Lendvai =

Hungarian composer and conductor (1882–1949)

Erwin Lendvai (4 June 1882 – 21 March 1949) was a Hungarian composer and choral conductor. He was an uncle of the composer Kamilló Lendvay.

Lendvai was born in Budapest. He graduated from the National Music Academy of Budapest, studying with Hans von Koessler. He also studied with Giacomo Puccini in Milan. From 1906 on, he lived in Germany, where he began his teaching career. From 1913 to 1914, he taught at the J.-Dalcroze Institute in Hellerau, near Dresden, where he married the photographer Erna Dircksen. From 1914 to 1920, he taught composition at the Klindworth-Scharwenka Conservatory in Berlin and in 1923 choral singing at the Volksmusikschule in Hamburg.

He was also director of a musical society in Koblenz and director of the popular choir of Munich. In 1929, he premiered Arnold Schoenberg's choral work Glück Op. 35, No. 4.

In 1933, he emigrated from Germany due to the Nazi regime and after that worked as a music teacher in Kenninghall, England. After the war, he headed the Györ Conservatory of Music. He became interested in Béla Bartók's music there. He died in Epsom, Surrey, UK.

Lendvai wrote one opera, Elga (1916, to a libretto by Gerhart Hauptmann), the festival music Völkerfreiheit (1930), a symphony, Archaic dances, Scherzo for orchestra, 3 Pieces for organ Op. 4, chamber music, choral works and songs. Lendvai's choral music influenced many other choral composers.

== Sources ==
- Erwin Lendvai, Dictionnaire de la musique, Grand Larousse encyclopédique (in French)
- German Wikipedia article
- Italian Wikipedia article
