= F. C. Gundlach =

German art dealer, photographer, and curator (1926–2021)

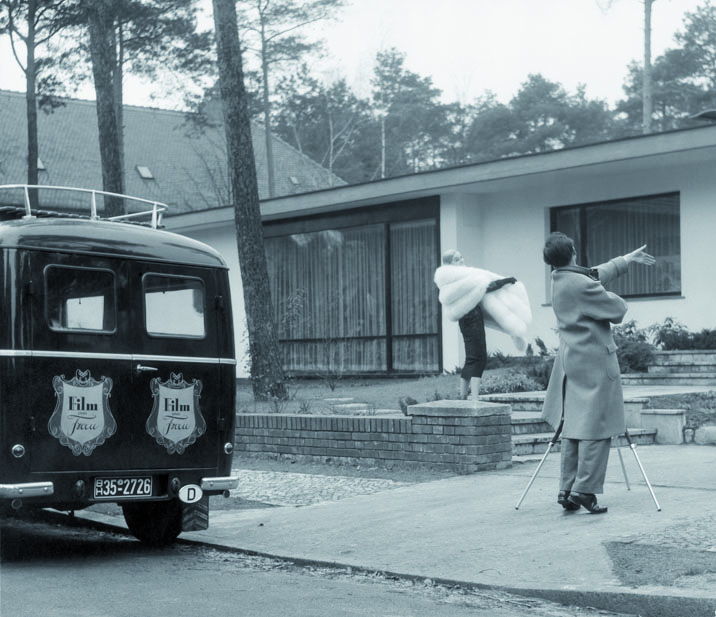
- F. C. Gundlach photographing for German magazine Film und Frau (Film and Woman) in Berlin 1955, model Grit Hübscher, stole by Staebe-Seger.
- Born: Franz Christian Gundlach; 16 July 1926; Heinebach, Alheim, Hesse, Germany
- Died: 23 July 2021 (aged 95); Hamburg, Germany
- Education: Private Lehranstalt für Moderne Lichtbildkunst (Private Academy for Modern Photography), Kassel
- Known for: Fashion photography

Franz Christian Gundlach (16 July 1926 – 23 July 2021) was a German photographer, gallery owner, collector, curator and founder.

In 2000 Gundlach created the F.C. Gundlach Foundation, and since 2003 he has been founding director of the House of Photography at Deichtorhallen, in Hamburg.

Gundlach's fashion photographs of the 1950s, 1960s and 1970s, often integrating social phenomena and visual arts trends, are now found in museums and collections. Since 1975 he has curated many photographic exhibitions. On the reopening of the House of Photography in April 2005, Gundlach curated a retrospective of Martin Munkácsi.

Gundlach also organized exhibitions from his own collections including A Clear Vision, The Heartbeat of Fashion and Maloney, Meyerowitz, Shore, Sternfeld: New Color Photography of the 1970s. He curated the exhibitions More Than Fashion for the Moscow House of Photography, and Vanity for the Kunsthalle Wien in 2011.

== Biography ==
=== Fashion photographer ===
F. C. Gundlach attended the Private Lehranstalt für Moderne Lichtbildkunst (Private School for Modern Photography) under Rolf W. Nehrdich in Kassel from 1946 to 1949. Subsequently, he began publishing theatre and film reports in magazines such as Deutsche Illustrierte, Stern, Quick and Revue as a freelance photographer.

Gundlach's specialization in fashion photography began in 1953 with his work for the Hamburg-based magazine Film und Frau, for which he photographed German fashion, Parisian haute couture and fur fashion campaigns. Additionally he photographed Romy Schneider, Hildegard Knef, Dieter Borsche and Jean-Luc Godard.

For Film und Frau, but also for Stern, Annabelle, Twen and other magazines, Gundlach made fashion and reportage trips to the Near, Middle and Far East as well as to Central and South America. Under an exclusive contract with Brigitte, he photographed more than 160 covers and 5,000 pages of editorial fashion. In the 1970s and 1980s he worked in South America, Africa, New York and on the American west coast.

Gundlach's retrospective solo exhibitions, such as ModeWelten (1985), Die Pose als Körpersprache (1999), Bilder machen Mode (2004) or F. C. Gundlach. The photographic work (2008) were shown in museums and galleries in Germany and abroad.

He is a photographer whose images show the knowledge of the dominant role of fashion as a cultural social factor. For this reason, he rarely presented the phenomena of fashion in isolation, but rather linked them to the phenomenology of everyday reality and placed them in the socio-cultural context from which they ultimately originated. F. C. Gundlach proves to be a photographic artist with a will to style, a mastery of staging and the ability to shape the photographic image at his leisure, who arranges his models in ever new formal constellations: as a photographer of extraordinary aesthetic quality.

— Klaus Honnef, Speech on the occasion of the opening of ModeWelten at the Rheinisches Landesmuseum Bonn 1986.

As a fashion photographer who makes use of a recording medium, the photographer must live, think and feel entirely in his time. Fashion photographs are always interpretations and stagings. They reflect and visualize the zeitgeist of the present and anticipate the spirit of tomorrow. They offer projection screens for identification, but also for dreams, wishes and desires. And yet fashion photographs say more about a time than documentary photographs pretending to depict reality.

— F.C. Gundlach, Speech on the occasion of the opening of F. C. Gundlach. Das fotografische Werk at the Martin-Gropius-Bau Berlin, November 19. 2009.

=== Entrepreneur, gallery owner, curator ===
Gundlach founded CC (Creative Color GmbH) in 1967 and soon afterwards the photographic service company PPS. (Professional Photo Service) with black and white and colour laboratories, equipment shop, rental studios and a specialist bookshop. In 1975 he expanded the company to include the PPS. Galerie F.C. Gundlach, one of the first pure photo galleries in Germany.

In the PPS. Gallery, Gundlach presented more than 100 exhibitions from 1975 to 1992. The artists included Irving Penn and Richard Avedon, Joel-Peter Witkin and Robert Mapplethorpe, Martin Kippenberger and Albert Oehlen, Nan Goldin and Wolfgang Tillmans. Since the early 1980s, his attention focused on his collection of photographic works and the conception of photographic exhibitions. Many of these exhibitions consisted completely or in parts of his collection, e.g. Das Medium Fotografie ist berechtigt, Denkanstöße zu geben at the Hamburger Kunstverein 1989, Berlin en Vogue at the Berlinische Galerie 1993, Modebilder, Bildermode / Zeitgeist becomes Form for the Institut für Auslandsbeziehungen (Ifa) 1995, Emotions & Relations at the Kunsthalle Hamburg 1998, Wohin kein Auge reicht at the Deichtorhallen Hamburg 1999 and Mode – Körper – Mode at the Museum für Kunst und Gewerbe Hamburg 2000.

After many years as a lecturer, Gundlach was appointed professor at the Hochschule der Künste Berlin in 1988. As a lobbyist for photography he initiated the Triennial of Photography in Hamburg in 1999.

=== F. C. Gundlach Foundation and House of Photography ===
To create a safe haven for his life's work and his extensive photo collection and to enable the active work with his entire photographic legacy, he created the F. C. Gundlach Foundation in 2000. Its purpose is the promotion of art, science and research in the field of photography, in particular the promotion of photography as a cultural asset.

Since September 2003 F. C. Gundlach was founding director of the House of Photography – Deichtorhallen Hamburg, where he installed his collection The Image of Man in Photography as a permanent loan.

== The F.C. Gundlach collection The Image of Man in Photography ==
The image of man has been topic in photography from the very beginning. The F. C. Gundlach collection attaches special importance to those photographic works that open up new perspectives on human dignity and vulnerability beyond their historical status as visual documents. Photography testifies to the ever-changing visual representation of mankind. A focal point of the collection are therefore photographs that reflect the image of man in his external appearance – in fashions, poses, facial expressions and gestures.

Works of visual artists using photography are of special interest, accentuating the dialogical character of the medium.

== Honours and awards ==
- Member of the German Society for Photography (DGPh) since 1972, elected to its board in 1976, the Golden Pin of Honour in 1996 and the DGPh Culture Prize in 2001.
- In 1997 Order of Merit of the Federal Republic of Germany.
- In 1998 Golden George Eastman Medal for outstanding services to German photography.
- In 2000 Honorary Professorship of the Hochschule für Bildende Künste Hamburg (HFBK).
- In 2006 the Hamburg Senate awarded him the Medal for Art and Science for his tireless commitment to photography in Hamburg.
- In 2008 honorary citizenship of the community of Alheim/Heinebach.
- In 2011 Hessian Culture Prize.
- In 2012 Henri Nannen Prize for his life's work.

== Exhibitions ==
=== Solo exhibitions ===
- 1951: F.C. Gundlach. Librairie Jean Robert, Paris
- 1986: ModeWelten, Rheinisches Landesmuseum Bonn; 1986 Neue Galerie Kassel; 1986 Hochschule der Künste Berlin; 1987 Museum für Kunst und Gewerbe Hamburg; 1988 Kunstverein Frankfurt am Main; 1988 Fotoforum Bremen; 1988 Kunstverein Erlangen; 1989 Neue Galerie des Joanneums Graz; 1990 Goethe-Institut Paris; 1990 Goethe-Institut Nancy; Marseille, Rotterdam
- 1997: Zeitgeist Becomes Form. American Fine Art New York
- 1999: Die Pose als Körpersprache, Fotomuseum Braunschweig; 2000 Kunstverein Halle Saale; 2001 Moscow House of Photography; 2001 Staatliche Museen zu Berlin – Kunstbibliothek; 2003 Städtische Galerie Iserlohn
- 2001: F. C. Gundlach – A Passion for Photography. Galerie Kicken Berlin
- 2004: Sophisticated Lady. Bread & Butter Berlin
- 2004: Bilder machen Mode. Neue Galerie des Joanneums Graz
- 2004: F. C. Gundlach – Mode und Porträts. focus Galerie Köln
- 2005: Die sechziger Jahre. Zephyr – Raum für Fotografie Mannheim
- 2005: Wählergunst – Wählerkunst. Die kleine Rache des Souveräns. Hühnerposten Hamburg
- 2006: Color. Galerie Kicken Berlin
- 2008: F. C. Gundlach. Das fotografische Werk. Haus der Photographie – Deichtorhallen Hamburg
- 2009: F. C. Gundlach. Das fotografische Werk. Martin-Gropius-Bau Berlin
- 2010: F. C. Gundlach. Das fotografische Werk. Neues Museum Nürnberg
- 2011: Berliner Durchreise 2011, Contemporary Fine Arts Berlin
- 2011: The Middle East in the 50s and 60s, Sfeir-Semler Gallery Beirut
- 2012: F.C. Gundlach. Berlin – Paris. Kulturhaus Osterfeld Pforzheim
- 2014: F.C. Gundlach in Brasilien – Mode- und Reportagefotografie. Stadtmuseum Nordhorn
- 2014: F.C. Gundlach. Kunsthaus Alte Mühle, Schmallenberg
- 2015: On the Wings of Fashion. AbtArt, Stuttgart
- 2016: 90 Jahre – 90 Bilder. CFA Galerie Berlin
- 2016: Eyes on Paris. Dear Photography, Hamburg
- 2018: Around the World in Fashion. Interconti, Düsseldorf

=== Group exhibitions ===
- 1975: Fotografie 1929–1975. Württembergischer Kunstverein Stuttgart
- 1979: Deutsche Photographie nach ’45. Kunstverein Kassel
- 1982: Lichtbildnisse – das Portrait in der Photographie. Rheinisches Landesmuseum Bonn
- 1983: Modefotografie der 50er Jahre. PPS. Galerie Hamburg
- 1985: Aufbaujahre – 3 Photographen: Fritz Eschen, F. C. Gundlach, Otto Borutta. Berlinische Galerie
- 1985: Das Selbstportrait im Zeitalter der Photographie. Musée Cantonal Lausanne
- 1985: 50 Jahre moderne Farbphotographie 1936–1986. Photokina Köln
- 1993: Berlin en Vogue. Berlinische Galerie; 1993 Museum für Kunst und Gewerbe Hamburg; 1993 Fotomuseum München
- 1995: Bildermode – Modebilder. Deutsche Modephotographie 1945–1995. Kunstbibliothek Berlin; 1995 Kunsthalle Bremen; 1996 Corgin Gallery Washington; 1996 Boston Art Institute; 1997 Pat Hearn/Morris Healy Gallery New York; Mailand, Rom, Genua, Tokio, Peking, Seoul, Singapur, Nowosibirsk, Omsk, Petersburg
- 1996: Twen. Stadtmuseum München; 1996 Kunsthaus Hamburg, 2002 Ministerio de Educacion, Cultura y Deporte Madrid
- 1997: Someone else with my fingerprints. David Zwirner Gallery New York
- 1999: Wohin kein Auge reicht. Deichtorhallen Hamburg
- 2000: Mode – Körper – Mode. Museum für Kunst und Gewerbe Hamburg
- 2001: Botschafterinnen der Mode. Kunstbibliothek Berlin
- 2003: Von Körpern und anderen Dingen. City Gallery Prague; 2004 Museum Bochum; 2004 Deutsches Historisches Museum Berlin; 2004 House of Photography Moskau
- 2004: Face to Face. Langhans Gallery Prag
- 2005: Entrez lentement. Politecnico di Milano
- 2005: My private Heroes. MARTa Herford
- 2005: Die fünfziger Jahre – Alltagskultur und Design. Museum für Kunst und Gewerbe Hamburg
- 2005: Braut Moden Schau. Altonaer Museum Hamburg
- 2010: The Heartbeat of Fashion as inspired by F. C. Gundlach. Howard Greenberg Gallery New York
- 2010: Fashion. Story of a Lifetime. Empty Quarter Gallery Dubai
- 2011: Vanity. Kunsthalle Wien
- 2013: Vanity. Muzeum Naradowe, Krakau
- 2014: Three. Hagedorn Foundation Gallery, Atlanta
- 2014: Steel Ikonen. Automuseum Protoyp, Hamburg
- 2015: Das Medium ist berechtigt, Denkanstöße zu geben. CFA Contemporary Fine Arts, Berlin

== Publications ==
=== Monographs on Gundlachs ===
- Klaus Honnef (Ed.): ModeWelten. F. C. Gundlach. Photographien 1950 bis heute. Exhib.-Cat. Rheinisches Landesmuseum Bonn, Berlin 1986.
- Benedikt Taschen Verlag (Ed.): F. C. Gundlach – Fashion Photography 1950–1975. Köln 1989.
- Staatliche Museen zu Berlin (Ed.): F. C. Gundlach – Die Pose als Körpersprache. Exhib.-Cat. Staatliche Museen zu Berlin – Kunstbibliothek, Köln 2001.
- Landesmuseum Joanneum – Bild- und Tonarchiv (Ed.): Bilder machen Mode – F. C. Gundlach. Exhib.-Cat. Landesmuseum Joanneum, Graz 2004.
- Hans-Michael Koetzle, Klaus Honnef, Sebastian Lux und Ulrich Rüter (Ed.): F. C. Gundlach. The photographic Work. Göttingen 2011.

=== Publications as editor and curator ===
- Gundlach, F. C. (Ed.): Vom New Look zum Petticoat. Deutsche Modephotographie der fünfziger Jahre, Berlin 1984.
- Gundlach, F. C. und Kunstverein Hamburg (Ed.): „Das Medium der Fotografie ist berechtigt, Denkanstöße zu geben.“ Die Sammlung F.C. Gundlach. Exhib.-Cat. Kunstverein Hamburg, Hamburg 1989.
- Gundlach, F. C. (Ed.): Zwischenzeiten, Bilder ostdeutscher Photographen. Hamburg, Berlin, Düsseldorf 1991
- Gundlach, F. C. und Uli Richter (Ed.): Berlin en vogue – Berliner Mode in der Photographie. Exhib.-Cat. Berlinische Galerie, Tübingen/Berlin 1993
- Gundlach, F. C. (Concept): Bildermode-Modebilder. Deutsche Modephotographien 1945–1995. Exhib.-Cat. Institut für Auslandsbeziehungen, Stuttgart 1995
- Gundlach, F. C. (Ed.): Das deutsche Auge. 33 Photographen und ihre Reportagen. 33 Blicke auf unser Jahrhundert. Exhib.-Cat. Deichtorhallen Hamburg, Hamburg 1996
- Hamburger Kunsthalle (Ed.): Emotions & Relations. Nan Goldin, David Armstrong, Mark Morrisroe, Jack Pierson und Philip-Lorca diCorcia. Exhib.-Cat. Hamburger Kunsthalle, Hamburg 1998
- Gundlach, F. C. (Ed.): Wohin kein Auge reicht. Von der Entdeckung des Unsichtbaren, Exhib.-Cat. Deichtorhallen Hamburg, Hamburg 1999
- Gundlach, F. C. (Ed.): Mode-Körper-Mode. Photographien eines Jahrhunderts. Dokumente der Photographie 5, Exhib.-Cat. Museum für Kunst und Gewerbe Hamburg, Hamburg 2000
- Gundlach, F. C. (Ed.): Martin Munkácsi. Think while you shoot! Exhib.-Cat. Haus der Photographie – Deichtorhallen Hamburg, Göttingen 2005, ISBN 978-3-86521-099-9
- Gundlach, F. C. (Ed.): Sworn Virgins, Heidelberg 2013, ISBN 978-3-86828-347-1
- Museum Folkwang and F.C. Gundlach Foundation (Ed.): Peter Keetman. Gestaltete Welt. Exhib.-Cat. Haus der Photographie – Deichtorhallen Hamburg, Göttingen 2016, ISBN 978-3-95829-204-8

== Films ==
- F. C. Gundlach – Meister der Modefotografie (2017) – 26 mins, documentary, written and directed by Eva Gerberding; produced by NDR, arte
