= Siegfried Lauterwasser =

German photographer

Siegfried Lauterwasser (16 April 1913 – 7 September 2000) was a German photographer. He was one of the most important representatives of subjective photography and a member of the group fotoform, which was influential in the post-war period.

He continued the photographic tradition of his father Alexander Lauterwasser (1878-1933) and his grandfather Alexander Lauterwasser (1846-1923).

== Life ==
Lauterwasser was born in Überlingen. After an apprenticeship as a photographer in his native town with his father Alexander Lauterwasser (1928/1929), he attended the Höhere Berufsschule für Grafik und gestaltendes Gewerbe in Frankfurt from 1929 to 1931. In 1933, he took over his father's photography studio, and in 1937 he passed the master craftsman's examination. During the Second World War, Lauterwasser was a photojournalist for the Wehrmacht Propaganda Troops. His main focus seems to have been photographs with the Luftwaffe and on the Eastern Front, much of it in colour photography. He became a member of fotoform in 1949. In 1987, he received his golden master's certificate. He published his pictures in magazines, books and as postcards. Typical of his photographic style is the subjective-artistic combination of movement, harmony and light. He died on 7 September 2000 in Überlingen at the age of 87.

== Topics ==
=== Landscape and animals ===
After the war, Lauterwasser turned to landscape, art and cultural photography of the Lake Constance area. Special images are the photographs of the Swabian-Alemannic Fastnacht, the sailing at Lake Constance, the Überlingen sword dancers and the water birds. He produced illustrated books about Lake Constance and its moods until the 1950s. He also took landscape photographs of the Black Forest, Italy, France, Svalbard and Africa. Special photographs are Eisbär bei Spitzbergen and Leopard Afrika.

=== Bayreuth Festival ===
In 1934, Wieland Wagner met Lauterwasser in the photography business. From 1952 to 1987, Lauterwasser recorded the productions of the Bayreuth Festival as a stage photographer. One particular photograph is Wagner's Tristan and Isolde in Bayreuth.

=== Herbert von Karajan ===
Karajan became aware of Lauterwasser in Bayreuth, and so Lauterwasser became Herbert von Karajan's preferred photographer from 1962 onwards. From 1967 to 1988, Lauterwasser was photographer at the Salzburg Easter Festival.

=== Classical music artists ===
His photos of conductors, soloists and singers of classical music in the second half of the 20th century were also used for records, CD covers and illustrated books. He took photos of Pierre Boulez, Karl Böhm, David Oistrach, Anne-Sophie Mutter, Mstislav Rostropovich, Arthur Rubinstein and Leonard Bernstein, among others. Recording venues were, among others, the Royal Opera of Versailles, the Wallfahrtskirche Birnau, the Salzburg Festival, the Wiener Singverein, the Berliner Philharmonie.

== The Century Picture ==
During the Seegfrörnen des Bodensees, he pictured a group of Hänsele with their colourful scale-shaped full-body mask dancing around (bodenseealemannisch: Hänselejuck) on Lake Überlingen on Shrove Sunday, 24 February 1963, after the carnival procession, against the special backdrop of the former Free imperial city Überlingen. Daily throughout the Seegfrörne, he captured moods and events in pictures and thus created a fund of artistic photographs of the 1963 Seegfrörne.

== Acknowledgement ==
The Culture Prize of the German Society for Photography was awarded in 1999 to the still living members of the fotoform group and thus to Lauterwasser. Parts of his estate are in the Berlin Prussian Heritage Image Archive and in the George Eastman Museum. Pictures by Lauterwasser are sold at auctions.

== Exhibitions ==
- 12 July 2013 – 6 October 2013: Städtische Galerie Überlingen im Faulen Pelz: 100 Jahre Siegfried Lauterwasser. Das photographische Lebenswerk.
- 4 August 2013 – 3 November 2013: Museum Haus Löwenberg, Gengenbach: AUGEN – BLICKE. Schwarzwald - Wein - Musik - Fotoform. Das Lebenswerk de Überlinger Photographen Siegfried Lauterwasser (1913–2000).
- 17 February 2014 – 14 March 2014: SWR-Studio Freiburg: "Augen-Blicke" Schwarzwald-Fotos von Siegfried Lauterwasser.
- 2019/2020: Ludwig Windstosser. Fotografie der Nachkriegsmoderne, Museum für Fotografie, Berlin

== Publications ==
- Überlingen in Lichtbildaufnahmen. Friedrichshafen 1938.
- Der Rathaussaal zu Überlingen. Ein Bildband. Überlingen 1947.
- Madonnen am Bodensee. Ein Bildband. Überlingen 1947.
- Das Heilige Grab zu Konstanz. Ein Bildband. Überlingen 1948.
- with Toni Schneiders and Victor Mezger: Narro und Hänsele. Schwäbisch-alemannische Volksfasnacht. Lindau 1956.
- Segeln am Bodensee. Bielefeld 2000.
