= Heinz Hajek-Halke =

German photographer (1898–1983)

- Born: 1 December 1898; Berlin, German Empire
- Died: 11 May 1983 (aged 84); West Berlin, West Germany
- Known for: Photography
- Movement: Surrealism
- Awards: Culture Award from the German Society for Photography (1965)

Heinz Hajek-Halke (1 December 1898 – 11 May 1983) was a German experimental photographer and educator. He was an early member of the Fotoform group.

== Early life ==
Hajek-Halke was born in Berlin, Germany, on 1 December 1898, the son of Paul Halke. He spent twelve years in Argentina while growing up and then moved back to Germany, studying graphics in Berlin in 1915. He was a soldier during World War I before returning to his artistic studies. He specialised in a number of areas, including engraving, illustrations, film posters and photo editing before becoming a photographer in 1924.

== Career ==
As a photographer, he began to focus on experimental work, including "light montages, double exposures, photo collages and photo montages". He would use multiple negatives for a single print, a technique called "combi-photography". He worked with the fashion photographer Yva. Hajek-Halke worked as a photo editor, press photographer, and commercial artist, concentrating almost from the start on montage techniques. In the 1930s with the rise of the Nazis he lived quietly, moving to Lake Constance after he refused to fake documentaries for the Nazi Party. He photographed small animal life-forms, including insects. In 1937, he travelled to Brazil, where he produced a documentary about a snake farm. He returned to Germany in 1939.

During World War II, Hajek-Halke was conscripted by the German army and worked as a photographer for Dornier, an aircraft company in Friedrichshafen. After the war he spent a brief time as a French prisoner of war. He then began selling snake venom from his own snake farm to the pharmaceutical industry. In 1949, Hajek-Halke became a member of the German group Fotoform after meeting Otto Steinert. His abstractions, photomontages and luminograms were included in the first of two "subjektive fotografie" exhibitions.

He was appointed as a lecturer in photography and graphic design at the Academy of Fine Arts in Berlin in 1955. Along with Felix H. Man, he won the 1965 Culture Award from the German Society for Photography. During his lifetime he published two books, Experimentelle Fotografie and Lichtgrafik.

== Death and legacy ==
He died in Berlin on 11 May 1983. He left his estate to the photographer Michael Ruetz, who donated it to the Academy of Arts, Berlin, in 2010.
