= Peter Keetman =

German photographer

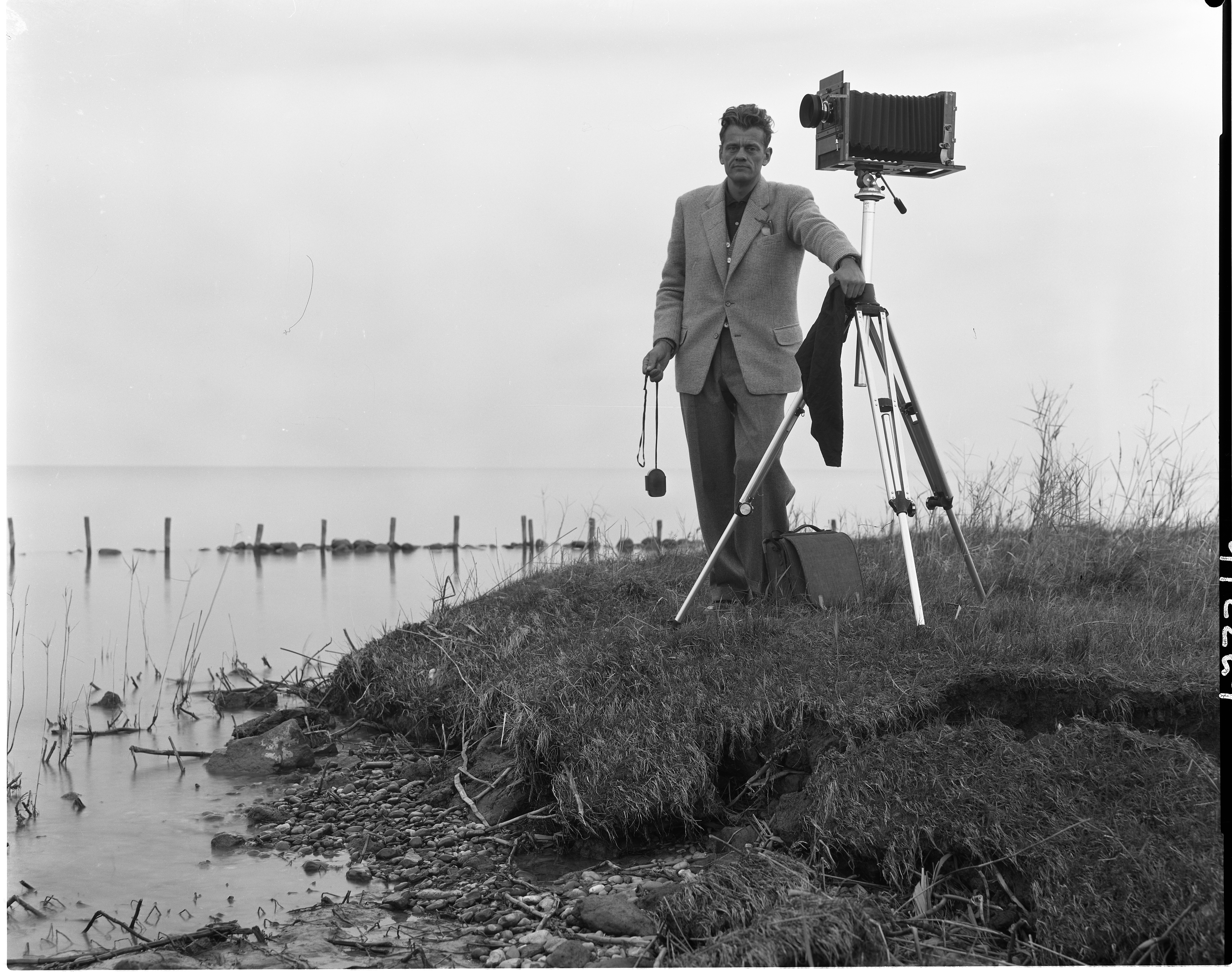
- Peter Keetman 1960, photo: Toni Schneiders
- Born: April 27, 1916; Elberfeld, Germany
- Died: March 8, 2005 (aged 88); Marquartstein, Germany
- Education: Bayerische Staatslehranstalt für Lichtbildwesen Munich
- Known for: Photography
- Movement: fotoform
- Spouse: Esa Keetman (m. 1951; died 2005)

Peter Keetman (April 27, 1916 – March 8, 2005) was a German photographer.

== Life and career ==
Peter Keetman was born in 1916 in Elberfeld. He was part of a very wealthy family and his father Alfred Keetman was bank director of the banking house J. Wichelhaus P. Sohn. Peter Keetman lived with his wife Esa in Prien, Breitbrunn and Marquartstein in Chiemgau (Upper Bavaria).

From 1935 to 1937 Keetman attended the Bayerische Staatslehranstalt für Lichtbildwesen (later called: Staatliche Fachakademie für Fotodesign Münch]). After graduating he became assistant to industrial and portrait photographer Gertrud Hesse in Duisburg and to industrial photographer Carl Heinz Schmeck in Aachen. In 1940 he was called up as a railway pioneer and returned from the war in 1944 seriously injured. From 1947 to 1948 he attended the master class of the Bayerische Staatslehranstalt für Lichtbildwesen. In 1948 he assisted Adolf Lazi with the planning and realization of the exhibition Die Photographie 1948 in the Landesgewerbemuseum Stuttgart.

In 1949 Keetman was a founding member of the avant-garde photography group fotoform and played a decisive role in determining the direction there so called subjective photography took. In the exhibition Subjective Photography put together by Otto Steinert in 1951 and in the accompanying photobook, Keetman's works have a formative role. From 1948, Keetman was represented with pictures in all major German and some international photo magazines. His work series Eine Woche im Volkswagenwerk (Volkswagen: A week at the Factory), which he photographed in 1953 in Wolfsburg, became particularly well known. His pictures of assembly line technology, car body parts and technical details of the Volkswagen Beetle were revolutionary, graphically designed photography through cropping and perspective.

The Museum Folkwang and the F. C. Gundlach Foundation dedicated a comprehensive retrospective to the photographer in 2016 on the occasion of his 100th birthday under the title Peter Keetman. Gestaltete Welt (Peter Keetman. Shaping the World).

== Selected exhibitions ==
- Peter Keetman, Staatliche Landesbildstelle, Hamburg 1961
- fotoform. Peter Keetman, Kicken, Cologne 1980
- Peter Keetman. Photographien, PPS Galerie F.C. Gundlach, Hamburg 1982
- Fotografien von Peter Keetman, Fotografie Forum, Frankfurt 1989
- Peter Keetman. Fotografien 1937–1987, Fotomuseum im Stadtmuseum, Munich 1991
- Peter Keetman. Fotografien, Von der Heydt-Museum, Wuppertal 1994
- Peter Keetman and fotoform, Howard Greenberg Gallery, New York 1995
- Peter Keetman. Bilder aus dem 1995 erworbenen Archiv, Museum Folkwang, Essen 1996
- Peter Keetman. Volkswagenwerk 1953, Kunstmuseum Wolfsburg 2003
- Peter Keetman, Kicken, Berlin 2006
- Peter Keetman. Gestaltete Welt, Museum Folkwang, Essen 2016
- Peter Keetman. Gestaltete Welt, Haus der Photographie – Deichtorhallen, Hamburg 2016
- Peter Keetman. Gestaltete Welt, Kunstfoyer, Munich 2017
- 2019/2020: Ludwig Windstosser. Fotografie der Nachkriegsmoderne, Museum für Fotografie, Berlin

== Selected bibliography ==
- München. Lebenskreise einer Stadt, Jan Thorbecke Verlag, Lindau 1955
- Ute Eskildsen (Hrsg.): Subjektive Fotografie – Bilder der 50er Jahre, Folkwang Verlag, Essen 1984
- Eine Woche im Volkswagenwerk. Fotografien aus dem April 1953, Nishen, Berlin 1985, ISBN 3-88940-605-X
- F. C. Gundlach (Hrsg.): fotoform / Peter Keetman, Nishen, Berlin 1988, ISBN 3-88940-017-5
- Volkswagen: A Week at the Factory, Chronicle Books, San Francisco 1992, ISBN 0-8118-0268-X
- Manfred Heiting (Hrsg.): Peter Keetman. Bewegung und Struktur, Cinubia, Amsterdam 1996, ISBN 90-802694-4-1
- Gijs van Tuyl (Hrsg.): Peter Keetman: "Volkswagenwerk 1953", Kerber Verlag, Bielefeld 2003, ISBN 3-936646-34-1
- F. C. Gundlach (Hrsg.): Peter Keetman – Gestaltete Welt. Steidl, Göttingen 2016, ISBN 978-3-95829-204-8 (including extensive biographical and bibliographical information)

== Awards ==
- 1981 David-Octavius-Hill-Medaille
- 1991 Kulturpreis der Deutschen Gesellschaft für Photographie

== Literature ==
- Angelika Bredemeyer: Der Photograph Peter Keetman, Bonn 1992

== Sources ==
- The Peter Keetman Archive in the F. C. Gundlach Foundation
- Information on Peter Keetman in the Deutschen Fotothek
- Literature by and about Peter Keetman in the German National Library catalogue
- Fotos wie cool Jazz, Die ZEIT vom 30 June 2016
- Peter Keetman. Biography, Exhibitions, Awards, Museum Folkwang (.pdf)
