= Angel of Peace =

Monument in the Munich suburb of Bogenhausen

- Friedensengel
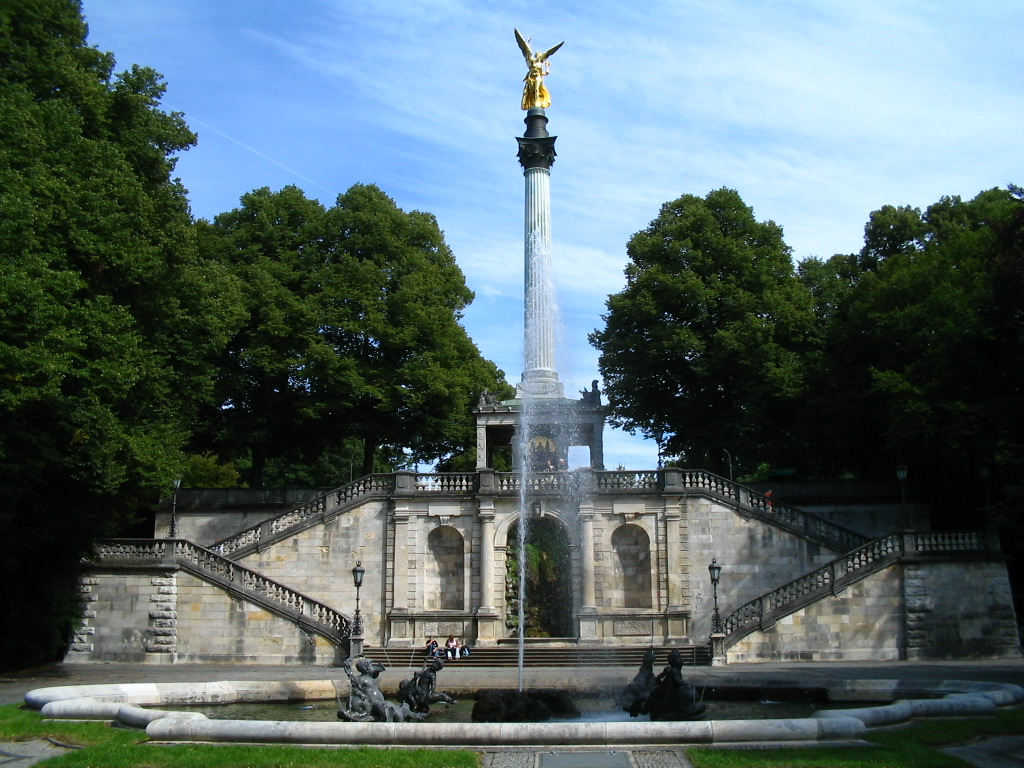
- The Monument of Angel of Peace
- Interactive map of Angel of Peace
- Location: Bogenhausen, Munich, Germany
- Coordinates: 48°08′29″N 11°35′49″E
- Designer: Heinrich Düll, Georg Pezold and Max Heilmaier
- Type: Monument
- Material: Bronze
- Height: 6 m (20 ft)
- Opening date: 10 May 1896

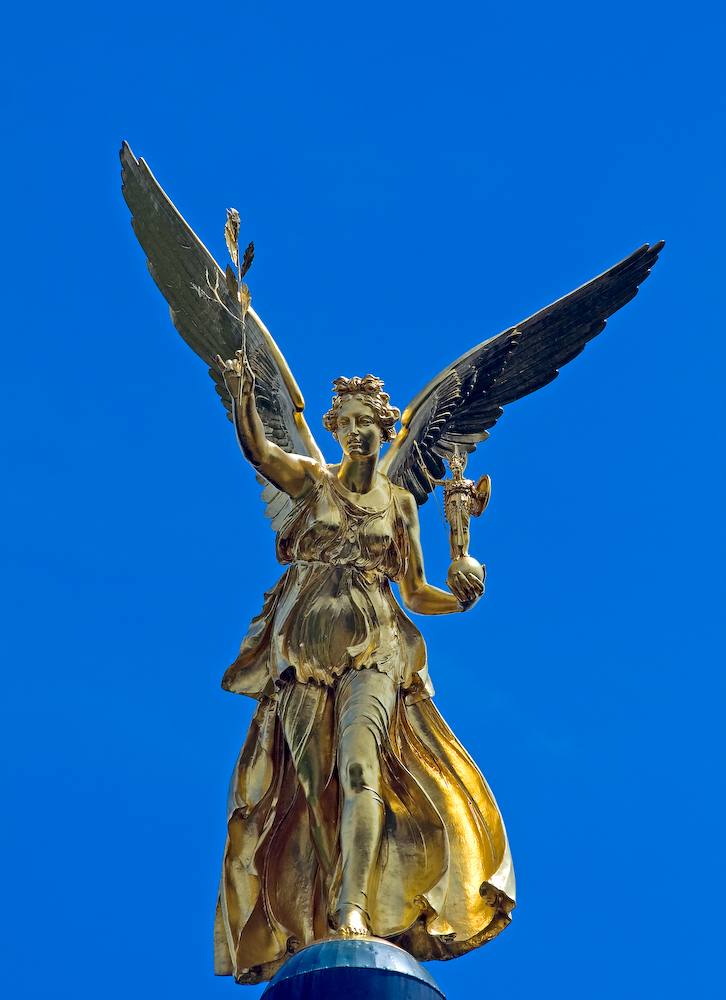
Angel of Peace

The Angel of Peace (German: Friedensengel) is a monument in the Bogenhausen district of Munich. The architects were Heinrich Düll, Georg Pezold and Max Heilmaier.

== Structure ==
The Angel of Peace is part of the Maximilian Park and a point de vue at the eastern end of a line of sight forming Prinzregentenstrasse. Next to the Isar, slightly elevated above street level, is an open space with a fountain; this has a dolphin waterspout surrounded by four smaller waterspouts. Two staircases lead to the observation deck . A column 38 metres high and in the Corinthian style is located here, on top of which is a six-metre statue of the Angel of Peace. It is a replica of the Nike of Paeonius.

The Angel of Peace is a reminder of the 25 peaceful years after the Franco-Prussian War of 1870/71. The monument with its small temple shows the portraits of the German Emperors William I, Frederick III, Wilhelm II, the Bavarian rulers Ludwig II, Otto and Luitpold, the Imperial Chancellor Otto von Bismarck and the generals Helmuth von Moltke, Albrecht von Roon, Ludwig von der Tann, Jakob von Hartmann and Siegmund von Pranckh. In the hall of the temple are gold mosaics which depict the allegories of war and peace, victory and blessing for the culture.

The foundation stone was laid on 10 May 1896; the unveiling was on 16 July 1899. The sculpture of gilded cast bronze was a collaborative work of the architects were Heinrich Düll, Georg Pezold and Max Heilmaier. The Putti Fountain is a work of Wilhelm von Rümann.

When the Angel was in danger of falling off the column in 1981, it was removed and thereby damaged. After having been restored, it was put back on its column in 1983, its leg and both wings having been replaced. The position of the wing is steeper compared to its original state.

== See also ==
- Angel of Peace (Mannheim)
- Guardian Angel of Portugal, known as the Angel of Peace
- Angel of Peace — a character from the Ukrainian Vertep (Nativity Scene). Virtual Vertep Vision.

== Books ==
- Norbert Götz: Angel of Peace. Devices for the understanding of a monument to the Prince Regent of time. Munich 1999th [An exhibition of the Munich City Museum ... of 17 December 1999 to 26 March 2000]
- Ekkehard Bartsch: The Prince Regent Street in Munich from 1880-1914 between Prince Charles and Angel of Peace Palace. Munich 1979th
- Georg Lill: Max healing Maier, a German sculptor. Munich 1922nd
