= Angel of Peace (Mannheim) =

Memorial for the victims of WWII

Coordinates: 49°29′24″N 8°27′44″E

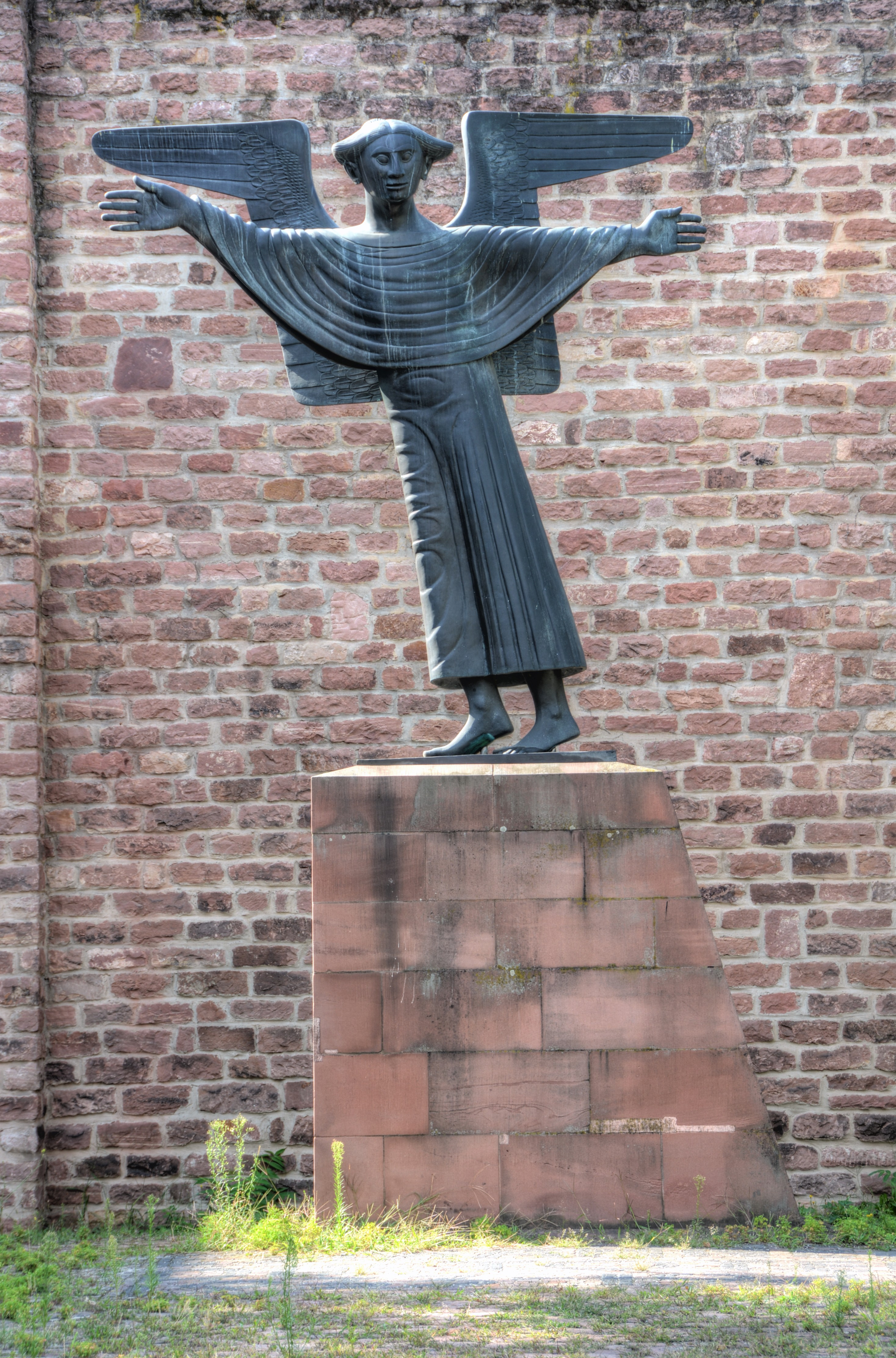
Angel of Peace in 2013

The Angel of Peace in Mannheim is a memorial for the victims of Nazi Germany and the Second World War, which was created in 1951/52 by the sculptor Gerhard Marcks. The statues other names are Mannheimer Engel and Angel of Death; the locals call the sculpture Die schepp' Liesel (The crooked Liesel).

== History ==
In August 1949, the Union of Persecutees of the Nazi Regime (VVN) applied for a memorial plaque to commemorate the resistance fighter, Lechleiter, and those executed with him at Georg-Lechleiter-Platz. In the course of the debate on the motion, the circle of victims of Nazi mentioned on the commemorative plaque was extended to include all those who were persecuted for political, religious or racial reasons, those imprisoned in concentration camps, those deported from Mannheim and those that died elsewhere. This was approved by the VVN.

In August 1950, the Social Democratic Lord Mayor Hermann Heimerich wanted the victims of the World War to be included; he also questioned the suitability of Lechleiter-Platz in Schwetzingerstadt. Heimerich strove for a uniform commemoration day for the fight against Nazi and for all the civilian and military victims of the war, stating that it was an obligation to political renewal and peaceableness. At the end of 1950, the Lord Mayor proposed a monument at Schillerplatz in the city centre.

Heimerich's ideas were supported by the CDU and SPD. The CDU council and Nazi persecuted Florian Waldeck, said that before the majesty of death the political party barriers should fall. The KPD councillor Anette Langendorf, whose husband had been executed as a member of the Lechleiter group and who herself was imprisoned in the concentration camp, took a counterposition. Langendorf advocated a memorial for the victims of the war, but pointed out that among the victims of the war "there [were] people who went to war with great vigour and enthusiasm for Hitler and who wanted exactly the opposite of what resistance fighters voluntarily sacrificed their lives for". The idea of a common memory caused considerable conflict among the people of Mannheim, especially the soldiers' associations.

The municipal council provided the funds for a memorial to the victims of the years 1933 to 1945; a KPD application for a commemorative plaque at Lechleiter-Platz was heldback and had no chance of being realized when a repeated application attempt was made in 1952.

== Sculpture ==
At the beginning of 1951, the city commissioned Gerhard Marcks to design the monument. Marcks was one of the most important German sculptors at the time but had been defamed by the Nazi in the exhibition "Degenerate Art". After liberation, Marcks created the memorial Fahrt über den Styx at the Hamburg-Ohlsdorf cemetery, and his designs were to be based on his sculpture Die Trauernde in Köln.

Marcks chose the motif of an angel. In doing so, his ideas were based on ancient Persian mythology, according to which the angel of man is the son who flies over the earth on the last day. The sculptor had already created two angel sculptures in 1937 and 1940. The latter, created under the impression of the death of his sister and bearing her facial features, was destroyed in the war. In the second half of the 1940s, Marcks had made several sketches for angelic figures, in which he strove for a stronger stylization and ornamentalization.

The Mannheim Angel has a very relief-like structure except for the fully sculptured skin; it spreads its arms out in front of its wings. The inclination of the vertical axis, together with the raised feet, gives the impression of a floating angel. The angel's wings and robe are drawn with parallel lines. Its left hand is slightly bent back, and right hand slightly raised. The director of the Mannheimer Kunsthalle, Walter Passarge, saw an "excess of suffering" in "the painfully restrained expression of the austere temperament with the huge, 'spellbinding' eyes". Together with the inscription - "Es mahnen die Toten" and "1939-1945" - it is a passionate reminder to the survivors. According to the historian Christian Peters, the angel captivates the observer, but blocks a quick identification. The combination of artistic aspiration, serious admonition and political message is what makes the monument so special. The inscription "included and did not exclude"; it made it clear "that 1945 would not have been conceivable without 1933".

The Lord Mayor Heimerich and Mannheim municipal councillors were initially sceptical about Marcks' design, which later gave way to approval and admiration. One local councilor thought that the angel would create a memorial that would be a symbol for Mannheim and a serious reminder to the population for centuries to come. In April 1952, the Mannheim administrative committee unanimously voted for the purchase of the artwork. The three-metre-high (9.8-foot) angel figure was cast in the summer of 1952 by the bronze founder Schmäke from Düsseldorf, and at the beginning of November it was placed on a two-metre-high (6.6-foot) sandstone base in square B 4 next to the Jesuit Church.

== Inauguration ==
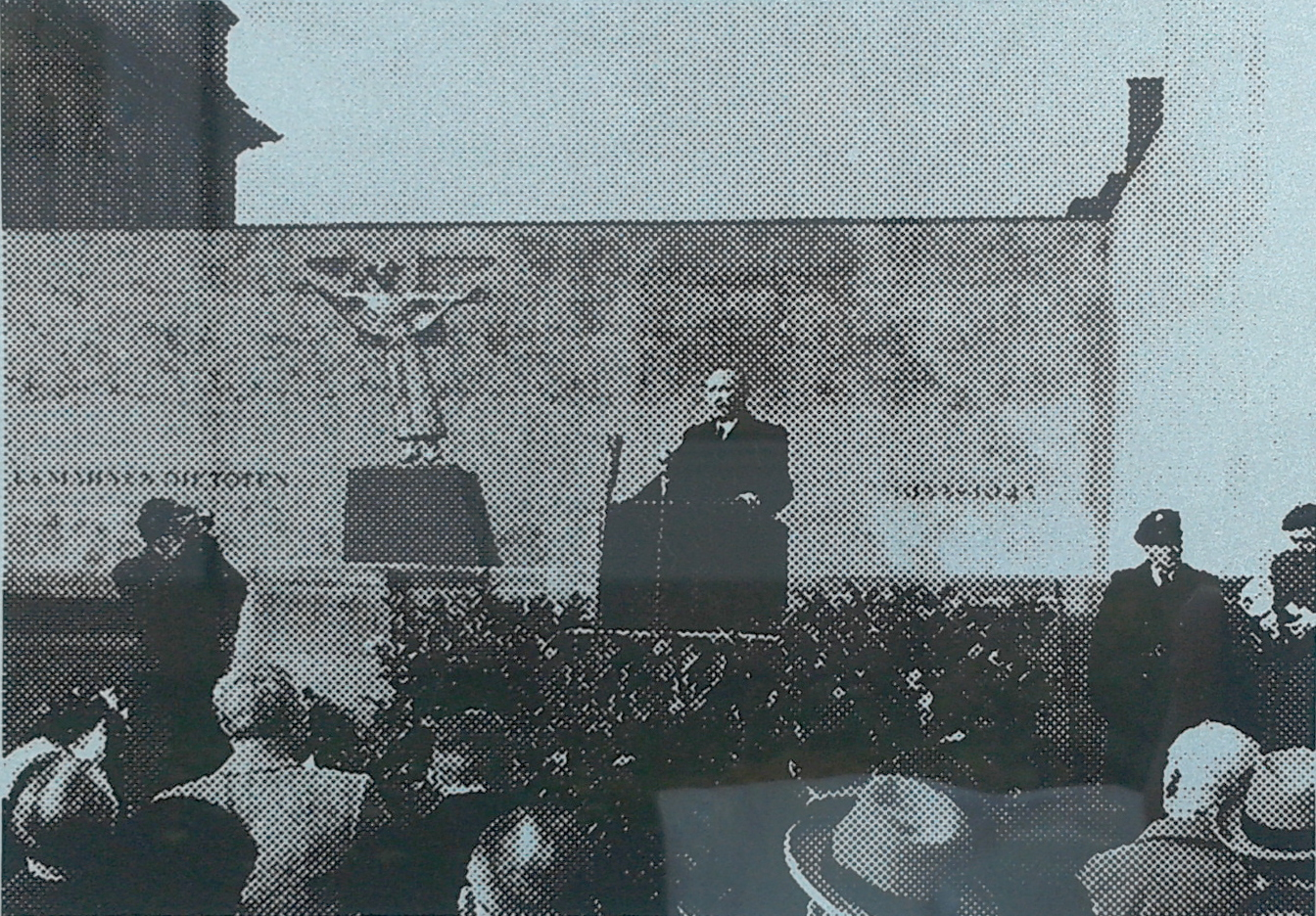
Address by Adenauer at the inauguration ceremony

The Angel of Peace was inaugurated on 16 November 1952, the National Day of Mourning. In front of about 5000 visitors, Lord Mayor Heimerich referred to the historical significance of Schillerplatz as the "probably most venerable square" in the city with the pre-war location of the Mannheim National Theatre, the site of the premiere of Schiller's "Robber", in which the poet had juxtaposed the ideal of noble humanity with tyranny. Heimerich gave the numbers of fallen and missing soldiers stationed in Mannheim, of civilians killed in air raids, and of Jews deported from Mannheim. He recalled resistance fighters such as the Lechleiter Group and commemorated the refugees and expellees who had come to Mannheim after the end of the war.

Federal Chancellor Konrad Adenauer then gave a brief, general speech. After which the Bishop Julius Bender and the Apostolic Protonotar Wilhelm Reinhard as representatives of the Archbishop of Freiburg, the rabbi Robert Raphael Geis spoke. He began his speech with the historian Hans-Joachim Hirsch statement, "the reality of the Holocaust into the celebration":

"It is different, for example, whether one dies in a fight from man to man, whether one dies in an air raid or whether one finds an end in the gas chambers of the East. And there is also a difference, whether one can think of a grave somewhere or whether there is nowhere else in this world a grave where loving thoughts can go on pilgrimage."

— State Rabbi Robert Raphael Geis

In the events leading up to the ceremony there had been conflicts between the two organizers, the city and the Volksbund Deutsche Kriegsgräberfürsorge. The War Graves Commission insisted on a delayed rally at Mannheim's main cemetery. The city administration gave the impression that the Volksbund was "uncomfortable" with the connection between commemorating the war graves and the political victims. In a letter to the War Graves Commission, Lord Mayor Heimerich declared that he had long regarded the fact that the commemoration days for the various groups of victims were "committed on different days and under different aspects" as a grievance, but could not persuade the War Graves Commission to change its mind.

== Memorial ==
In 1953 the commemoration of the national day of mourning took place in smaller form at the Angel of Peace. Before the Memorial Day in 1954, the soldiers' and returnees' associations clearly stated that they did not want to be mentioned at the ceremony together with the Jews and other victims of National Socialism. When the city administration learned that the soldiers' associations were preparing a big ceremony in the cemetery, they cancelled the event at the Angel of Peace in order not to intensify the separation. In the following years, the memorial service, which was initially organized by the Volksbund alone, received an increasingly military character. From 1958 the city, the Volksbund and the Arbeitsgemeinschaft soldiatischer Verbände, to which the Hilfsgemeinschaft auf Gegenseitigkeit der Angehörigen der ehemaligen Waffen-SS (HIAG) belonged, jointly invited to the event at the cemetery. For the historian Christian Peters, it is "more than just a nuisance" that former members of the Waffen-SS called on the Mannheim population and thus also survivors of the Holocaust to an event at which the victims of persecution and resistance were also remembered.

On the tenth anniversary of the end of the war, an "hour of reflection" took place at the Angel of Peace on 7 May 1955, to which Lord Mayor Heimerich invited the Protestant theologian Helmut Gollwitzer. Before several thousand people Gollwitzer warned, "Remembrance is duty, also and straight if it hurts". For Gollwitzer the angel of peace stood "against our flight into oblivion, with which we want to undo what happened".

Since 1954, an informal wreath has been laid on the Angel of Peace for the national day of mourning. In May 1983, the Angel of Peace was moved to a less prominent location in square E 6 next to the hospital church, since residential buildings were to be erected at Schillerplatz. According to information from the 1990s, the Angel of Peace served as a starting point or destination for actions of the peace movement or anti-fascist organizations.

In 2008, Sebastian Parzer stated that Heimerich, as a person persecuted even by the National Socialists, possessed a "different instinct", which was evident, for example, in his dealings with the Jewish community of Mannheim. His concept of a central memorial service in the city centre, linked to the angel of peace, could not be implemented. According to Hans-Joachim Hirsch, the Angel of Peace already had an "important function in commemorating the horrors of the Nazi era" alone due to its prominent former location. The attempt to „integrate broad sections of the population [must] at least in part be regarded as a failure“. Not only the Jewish community must have felt duped by the general dedication of the angel, stated Hirsch 2005. For Christian Peters, too much was expected with the hope for renewal, for which the angel should stand. Heimerich's concept was an attempt to unite contradictions that could not be united in reality. The emergence of soldiers' and returnees' associations had increased the difficulties in establishing a new tradition of remembrance of the dead. "The talk of the victims, the public thematization of the special role of the persecuted, disturbed the process of integrating millions of followers of National Socialism into German democracy," said Peters in 2001.

As early as November 1954, the Rhein-Neckar-Zeitung saw the Angel of Peace "falling for the fate of intellectual isolation; without the community that gathers around it every year, it stands in a vacuum, lacking the unifying function“. Lord Mayor Heimerich considered the memorial, shortly before the end of his term of office in the summer of 1955, as not yet completely taken up in the consciousness of the population. He told Helmut Gollwitzer that the soldiers' associations "distinguish between heroes and victimss and do not want their heroes to be named at the same time as the victims".
