= Luisa Heese =

German curator

Luisa Heese (born 1984 in Göttingen, Lower Saxony), is a German curator. Since July 1, 2023, she is curator for contemporary art and sculpture at the Kunsthalle Mannheim From June 1, 2025, Heese will also become Deputy Director of the Kunsthalle. From september 2020 until 2023 she been head of the Museum im Kulturspeicher in Würzburg.

== Life ==
Luisa Heese studied Cultural Studies and Aesthetic Communication from 2005 to 2013 at the Stiftung Universität Hildesheim in Hildesheim and at the School of Arts and Design Escola Superior De Artes e Design in Caldas da Rainha in Portugal. In 2015, she was hired as curator at the Kunsthalle Baden-Baden. Following the departure of the previous director Johan Holten, she and her colleague Hendrik Bündge temporarily headed the Kunsthalle from September 1, 2019.

== Curator for contemporary art and sculpture at the Kunsthalle Mannheim ==
Luisa Heese was appointed curator for Contemporary art and sculpture at the Kunsthalle Mannheim on July 1, 2023. In her first exhibition curated there, Fokus Sammlung: Neupräsentation, she explored the museum's extensive collection, supplemented by loans from various public art collections. She designed several exhibition rooms, which are referred to as cubes in the Kunsthalle, with focal points such as Bewegte Zeiten: Kinetik (Moving Times: Kinetics) (Cube 4), Der fragmentierte Körper (The Fragmented Body) (Cube 5) and in Cube 6, works by Anselm Kiefer were presented under the title Risse in der Geschichte (Cracks in History). On display were among others kinetic objects by Ernst Reinhold in Cube 4, sculptures by Hans Arp, Gustav Seitz and Henry Moore in Cube 5 and in Cube 6, among others, a work by Anselm Kiefer that had never been exhibited in the Kunsthalle before: Böhmen liegt am Meer (Böhmen is located by the sea). The collection presentation was displayed at the Kunsthalle until May 2025.

== Curated exhibitions at the Kunsthalle Mannheim ==
- 2024: Fokus Sammlung: Neupräsentation
- 2024: Sarah Lucas
- 2024: Hito Steyerl: Hell Yeah We Fuck Die, Kunsthalle Mannheim, Kubus 2
- 2025: Tavares Strachan: Supernovas
- 2025: Joachim Bandau: Die frühen Polyesterskulpturen 1967 – 1974 (The early polyester sculptures 1967 – 1974)
- 2025: Kirchner, Lehmbruck, Nolde: Geschichten des Expressionismus in Mannheim (curated together with Johan Holten und Ursula Drahoss),
- 2026: Radikal. Real: Nouveau réalisme und die Kunst der 1960er Jahre (Radical. Real: Nouveau réalism and the Art of the 1960s),

== Work during her time as director of the Museum im Kulturspeicher (2020 to 2023) ==
The Museum im Kulturspeicher Würzburg has two major collection areas. On the one hand, the Städtische Sammlung, which contains art from the 19th century to the present day, and on the other hand the Peter C. Ruppert Collection, which is dedicated to works of Concrete art.

Luisa Heese saw her task as director of the museum primarily in making connections. Connections, for one, in the city - for example, in 2021 she cleared her permanent collection for the exhibition Imagine Mozart - Mozartbilder, which took place as part of the Mozart Festival Würzburg, which the director of the Martin von Wagner Museum's Modern Department, Damian Dombrowski, commented on: "The years of preparation were already characterized by trusting cooperation with the Mozartfest, but with the Kulturspeicher as a 'third party in the alliance', the development of the exhibition was carried by a real esprit de corps. Above all, foundations are being laid for future joint projects!" (Note: Dombrowski quotation: "Schon die Jahre der Vorbereitung waren von vertrauensvoller Zusammenarbeit mit dem Mozartfest geprägt, aber mit dem Kulturspeicher als ‚Dritten im Bunde‘ wurde der Aufbau der Ausstellung von einem echten esprit de corps getragen. Vor allem werden dabei auch Fundamente für zukünftige Gemeinschaftsprojekte gelegt!")

She also sought connections with visitors of the museum, for example, for the opening of the exhibition New Order art mediators were present in all rooms - recognizable by T-shirts with a question mark as a logo - to answer questions and with whom visitors could engage in conversation about the exhibition.

Furthermore, she saw it as her task to connect the Local and the Global, as it has already been practiced, for example, in the exhibition Konkret Global! (Concrete Global!).

Parallel to the exhibition, a symposium on the topic of Concrete art was held on October 25 and 26, 2022, together with the Institute for Art History of the Julius-Maximilians-Universität Würzburg, which was also streamed online: "With the research and exhibition project Konkret Global! (Concrete Global!), the Museum im Kulturspeicher Würzburg, in cooperation with international and local partners, illuminates concrete art and its key figures from a global perspective for the first time. What does concrete art look like in the Global South, what is its significance, and what are the differences between the ideas that concrete artists express through their works?" (Note: Konkret Global blurb: "Mit dem Forschungs- und Ausstellungsprojekt 'Konkret Global'! beleuchtet das Museum im Kulturspeicher Würzburg in Zusammenarbeit mit internationalen wie lokalen Partnern konkrete Kunst und ihre Schlüsselfiguren erstmals aus einer globalen Perspektive. Wie sieht konkrete Kunst im Globalen Süden aus, welche Bedeutung hat sie und worin unterscheiden sich die Ideen, denen die konkreten Künstler mittels ihrer Arbeiten Ausdruck verleihen?")

At the end of 2020, Luisa Heese outlined her intentions in an interview: "I want to set themes that are both important for the local society and of more international relevance for an audience from outside. I'm thinking of themes that take up social, that take up political issues [...] The classic art exhibition in museum spaces is one thing. But I want to bring themes to the city and I'm looking forward to collaborations. I'm thinking of the idea of the open museum not only in the sense of an open door, but in the sense of a museum that steps out itself." (Note: Themes in 2020: "Ich möchte Themen setzen, die sowohl für die Gesellschaft vor Ort wichtig wie auch für ein Publikum von außen von internationalerer Relevanz sind. Ich denke an Themen, die gesellschaftliche, die politische Fragen aufgreifen [...] Die klassische Kunstausstellung in Museumsräumen ist die eine Sache. Aber ich möchte Themen in die Stadt tragen und freue mich auf Kooperationen. Ich denke an die Idee des offenen Museums nicht nur im Sinne einer offenen Tür, sondern im Sinne eines Museums, das selbst hinaustritt.")

== Curated Exhibitions at the Museum im Kulturspeicher Würzburg ==
- 2021/2022: New Order. Über Kunst und Ordnung in ungewissen Zeiten (New Order. About art and order in uncertain times (Curated by Luisa Heese)
- 2022/2023: Konkret Global! (Concrete Global!) (Curated by Luisa Heese and Anke Kempkes)
- 2023/2024: HEXEN! Über Körper, Wissen und Macht (WITCHES! About bodies, knowledge and power) (Curated by Luisa Heese and Henrike Holsing)

== Curated Exhibitions at the Kunsthalle Baden-Baden (selection) ==
- 2018: Alina Szapocznikow: Menschliche Landschaften (Human landscapes) Kunsthalle Baden-Baden, Germany (curated by Luisa Heese and Hendrik Bündge)
- 2019/2020: Boris Mikhailov: The Space between us Kunsthalle Baden-Baden, Germany (curated by Luisa Heese)
- 2020: Valie Export: Fragmente einer Berührung (Fragments of a touch) Kunsthalle Baden-Baden, Germany (curated by Luisa Heese and Hendrik Bündge)
- 2020: Körper. Blicke. Macht. Eine Kulturgeschichte des Bades (Body. Looks. Power. A cultural history of the bath) Kunsthalle Baden-Baden (curated by Luisa Heese, Hendrik Bündge, Camille Faucourt, Florence Hudowicz, Carolin Potthast, Benedikt Seerieder and Lukas Töpfer)

== Exhibition catalogs ==
- Staatliche Kunsthalle Baden-Baden, ed. (2020). Körper. Blicke. Macht. Eine Kulturgeschichte des Bades [Body. Looks. Power. A cultural history of the bath] (in German and English). Berlin: Hatje Cantz. ISBN 978-3-7757-4725-7.
- Heese, Luisa, ed. (2020). Sergej Jensen 2017 (in German and English). Berlin: Bom Dia Boa Tarde Boa Noite. ISBN 978-3-96436-006-9.
- Heese, Luisa; Baden-Baden, Staatliche Kunsthalle (2019). Boris Mikhailov – Serie von Vier. Boris Mikhailov – Series of Four (in German and English). Cologne: Walther König. ISBN 978-3-96098-735-2.
- Holten, Johan, ed. (2019). Psyche als Schauplatz des Politischen [Psyche as the arena of the political]. Berlin: Hatje Cantz. ISBN 978-3-7757-4568-0.
- Bonacina, Andrew; Dziewańska, Marta; Heese, Luisa, eds. (2018). Alina Szapocznikow. Menschliche Landschaften. Human Landscapes (in German and English). Cologne: Verlag Walther König. ISBN 978-3-96098-417-7.
- Heese, Luisa; Holten, Johan; Ndikung, Bonaventure Soh Bejeng; Nzewi, Ugochukwu-Smooth C., eds. (2018). Emeka Ogboh: If found please return to Lagos (in German and English). Berlin: Kerber. ISBN 978-3-7356-0437-8.
- Holten, Johan, ed. (2016). Gutes böses Geld: Eine Bildgeschichte der Ökonomie. Money, Good and Evil: A Visual History of the Economy (in German and English). Berlin: Kerber. ISBN 978-3-7356-0228-2.
- Heese, Luisa; Brodowsky, Paul; Droste, Thilo (2014). Thilo Droste. Ego. Katalog zur Ausstellung im Kunstverein Augsburg [Thilo Droste. Ego. Catalog for the exhibition at Kunstverein Augsburg]. Cologne: Snoek. ISBN 978-3-86442-104-4.
- Holten, Johan; Heese, Luisa, eds. (2014). Eva Kotátková: Experiment für sieben Körperteile [Eva Kotátková: Experiment for seven body parts] (in German and English). Berlin: Kerber. ISBN 978-3-7356-0061-5.
