= Inge Dick =

Austrian photographer (born 1941)

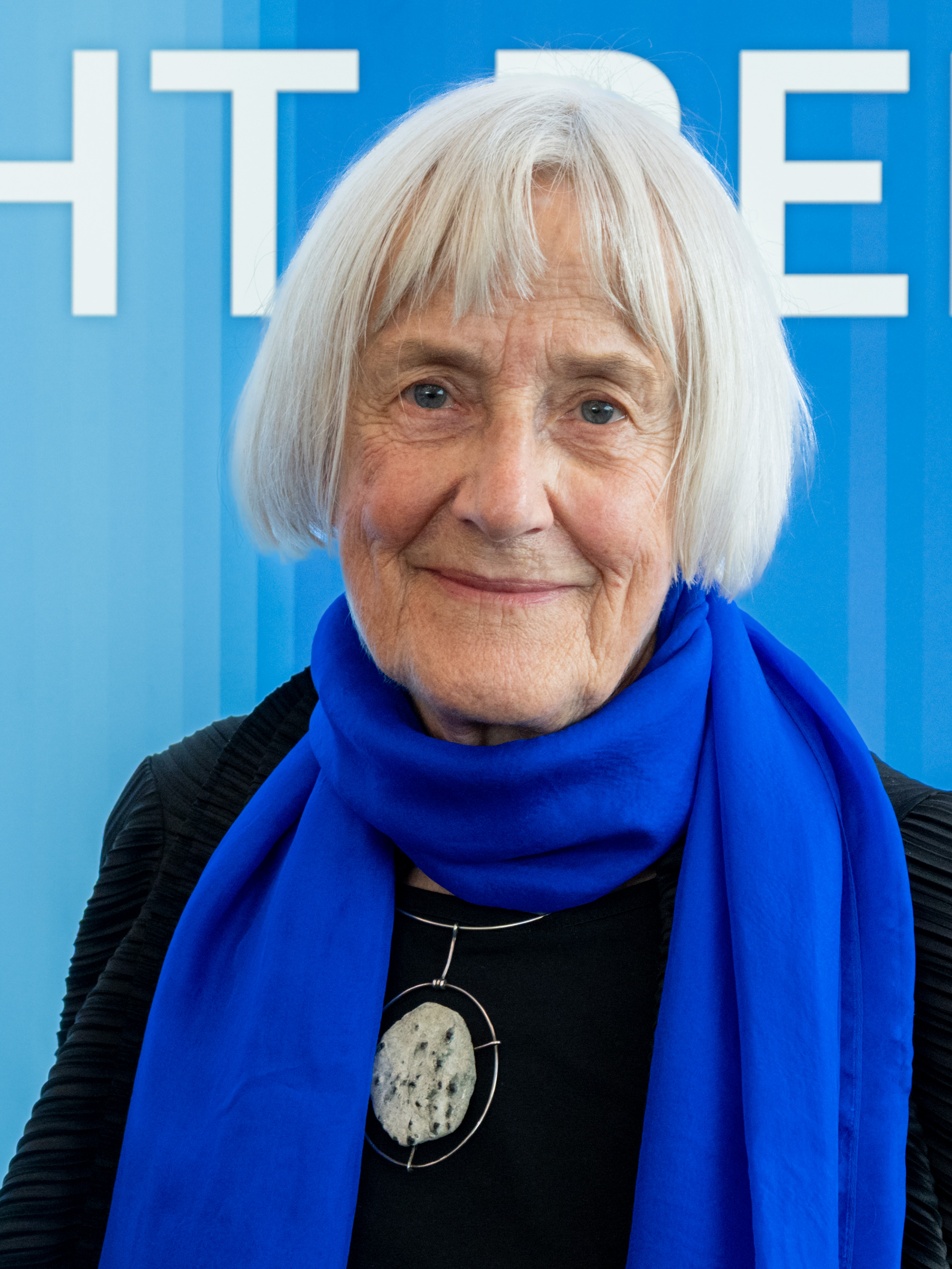
Inge Dick in 2026

Inge Dick (born 15 January 1941, in Vienna) is an Austrian photographer and painter, best known for her polaroid photography, her paintings in the classical modernism style, and her land art in the Mondsee region. A graduate of the University of Applied Arts Vienna, she is a member of the Zero artist group. Her works have been exhibited at the Lenbachhaus, the Museum im Kulturspeicher Würzburg, the Gartenpalais Liechtenstein, and she has been the recipient of the Theodor Körner Prize, the Kulturpreis des Landes Oberösterreich, the Peter C. Ruppert Prize for Concrete Art in Europe and the Heinrich Gleißner Prize.
