= Fritz Wichert =

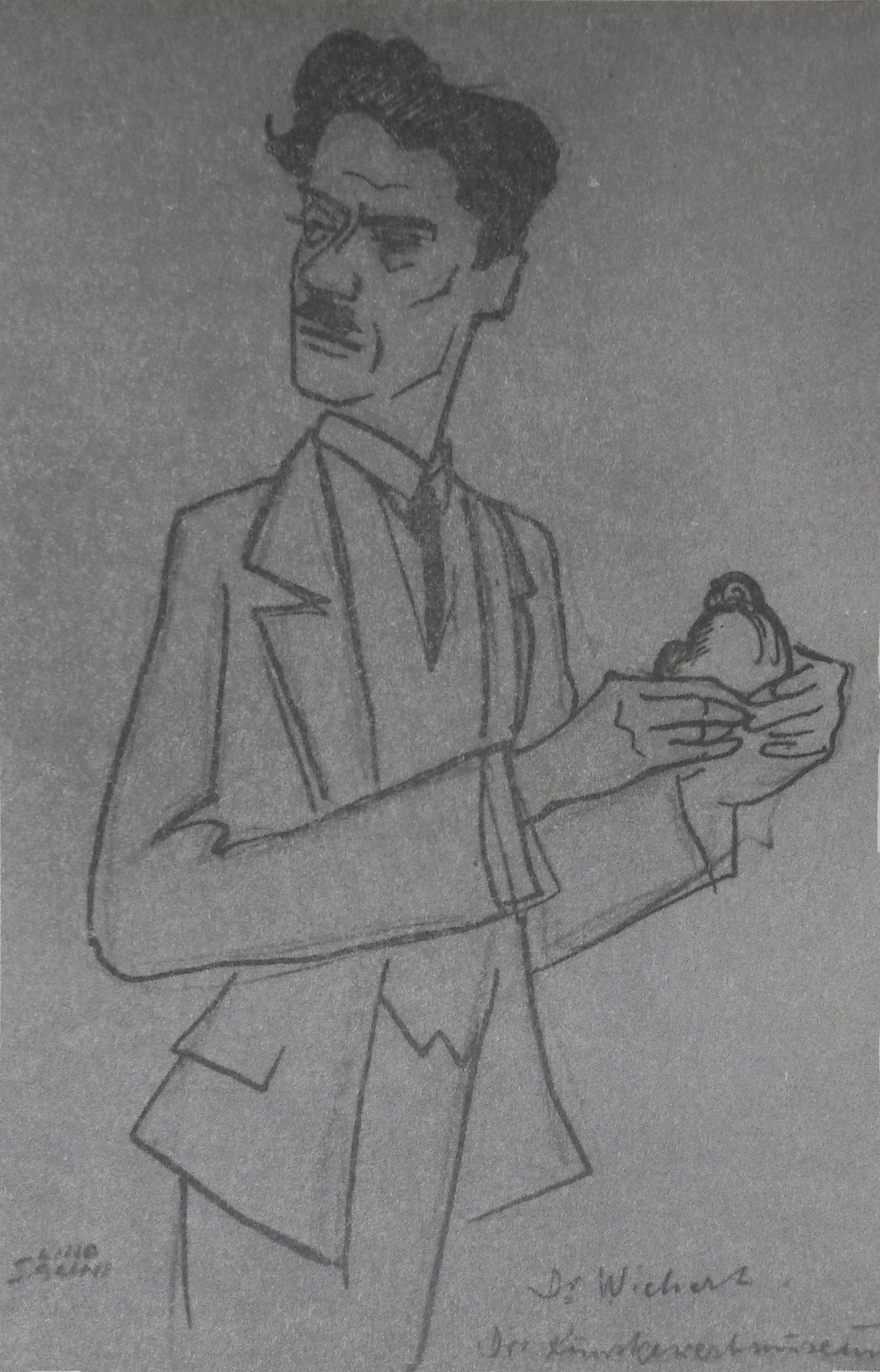
Fritz Wichert by Lino Salini

Friedrich Karl Adolf Wichert (born 22 August 1878 in Mainz-Kastel; died 24 January 1951 in Kampen (Sylt)) was a German art historian. He was the director of the Kunsthalle Mannheim and the Frankfurt Städelschule. He also participated in New Frankfurt.

== Career ==
Wichert, who completed his doctorate in 1907 in Freiburg, became first director of the Kunsthalle Mannheim as early as 1909, where he expanded the collection to include paintings from the 19th century with a focus on French Modernism. One of the most important acquisitions for the museum was Édouard Manet‘s The Execution of Emperor Maximilian. During the First World War, Wichert belonged to the diplomatic service. After the war, he returned to the Mannheim Kunsthalle and put the collection focus on the Expressionists. In 1923, Wichert was appointed as director of the Städelschule in Frankfurt.
