= Peter C. Ruppert Prize for Concrete Art in Europe =

Peter C. Ruppert Prize for Concrete Art in Europe is an initiative by the city of Würzburg. Since 2008 the Prize for Concrete Art in Europe is awarded every three years.

== Prize for Concrete Art in Europe ==
The prize money of 15,000 Euros is provided by the Peter C. Ruppert Foundation: Collection of Concrete Art in Europe after 1945.

The prize is awarded to internationally important artists of the Concrete art movement. It serves to highlight the rank and importance of Concrete Art for the development of contemporary art and to make the Peter C. Ruppert Collection at the Museum im Kulturspeicher Würzburg known to a broader audience.

At the same time, the prize is intended to help emphasize Würzburg's special status as a city of culture and Europe both nationally and internationally. The prize was first awarded in 2008 to the French artist François Morellet, in 2011 to the German Heijo Hangen and in 2013 to the Hungarian artist Dóra Maurer.

== Peter C. Ruppert Collection ==
The Peter C. Ruppert Collection was assembled by Peter C. Ruppert (1935–2019) who was a businessman and art collector. In the 1970s of the 20th century he started to collect works of concrete art (konkret as in tangible) with a focus on art after 1945. His collection includes around 418 works by 254 European Concrete artists from the end of World War II onwards from almost all parts of Europe.

The collection or at least a part of it is permanently exhibited at the Museum im Kulturspeicher Würzburg. The collection is on permanent loan to the museum since 2002.

== Prize winners ==
- 2008: François Morellet
- 2011: Heijo Hangen
- 2013: Dóra Maurer
- 2016: Hans Jörg Glattfelder
- 2019: Norman Dilworth
- 2022: Inge Dick
