= Gustav Friedrich Hartlaub =

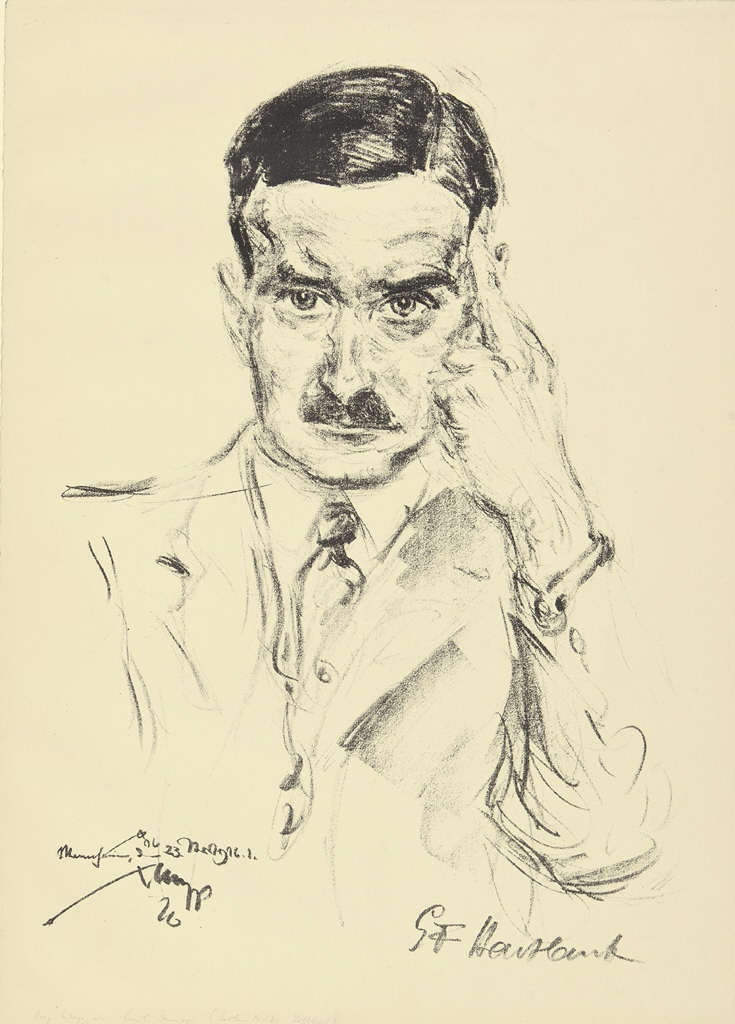
Portrait of GF Hartlaub by Emil Stumpp, 1926, lithograph

Gustav Friedrich Hartlaub (12 March 1884 – 30 April 1963) was a German art historian, critic, and curator.

He was born in Bremen into a merchant family. He studied with Franz Wickhoff in Vienna and Heinrich Wölfflin in Berlin, among others, until 1910 and then initially worked as assistant to Gustav Pauli at the Kunsthalle Bremen. Hartlaub became the director of the Kunsthalle Mannheim in 1923. He was particularly committed to the promotion of contemporary art.

On 14 June 1925, an exhibition Hartlaub curated, Neue Sachlichkeit: Deutsche Malerei seit dem Expressionismus (New Objectivity: German Painting Since Expressionism), opened at the Kunsthalle Mannheim. The result of two years' research, the exhibition displayed the works of artists who had turned away from Expressionism in favor of a "new naturalism" Hartlaub called New Objectivity.

New Objectivity as defined by Hartlaub comprised two stylistic tendencies:

I see a right and a left wing. The first, so conservative as to be equal to Classicism, rooted in that which is timeless, is seeking once again to sanctify that which is healthy, corporeal, sculptural, through pure drawing from nature ... The other wing, incandescently contemporary in its lack of belief in art, born rather from a denial of art, is attempting to expose chaos, the true feeling of our days, by means of a primitive obsession with assessment, a nervous obsession with the exposure of the self.

The exhibition included 124 works by artists such as Georg Schrimpf and Alexander Kanoldt (of the "right" or neo-Classicist wing) and George Grosz and Otto Dix (of the "left" or Verist wing). The exhibition, which traveled to several other German cities, was a popular and critical success and helped popularize the New Objectivity style.

On 20 March 1933, Hartlaub was dismissed as part of the National Socialist cultural policy.

From 1946, he worked as a professor in Heidelberg. He was also involved in the field of esoteric approaches to the arts and art education, where he became known in particular for his work Der Genius im Kinde (Genius in Children; 1922). He died on 30 April 1963 in Heidelberg.
