= Ulrike Lorenz =

German art historian

Ulrike Lorenz (born 1963 in Gera) is a German art historian and President of the Klassik Stiftung Weimar.

In 2008, the art historian Ulrike Lorenz became director of the Kunsthalle Mannheim. In 2009, after a renewal in the juvenile-style building (1907) of the Kunsthalle Mannheim, the collection was reopened. For this purpose, the collection was subdivided into twelve thematic spaces of different epochs of the art layer, from Romantic to Realism. By 2018, the extension building from 1983 was demolished and replaced by the larger Hector building. On 1 June 2018, the reopening of the Kunsthalle Mannheim took place with a "Grand Opening" and a screening of photographs by Canadian artist Jeff Wall. In October 2018, Lorenz was elected president of the Klassik Stiftung Weimar. She took office in August 2019.
