= Museum im Kulturspeicher Würzburg =

Art museum in northern Bavaria, Germany

Coordinates: 49°48′05″N 9°55′21″E

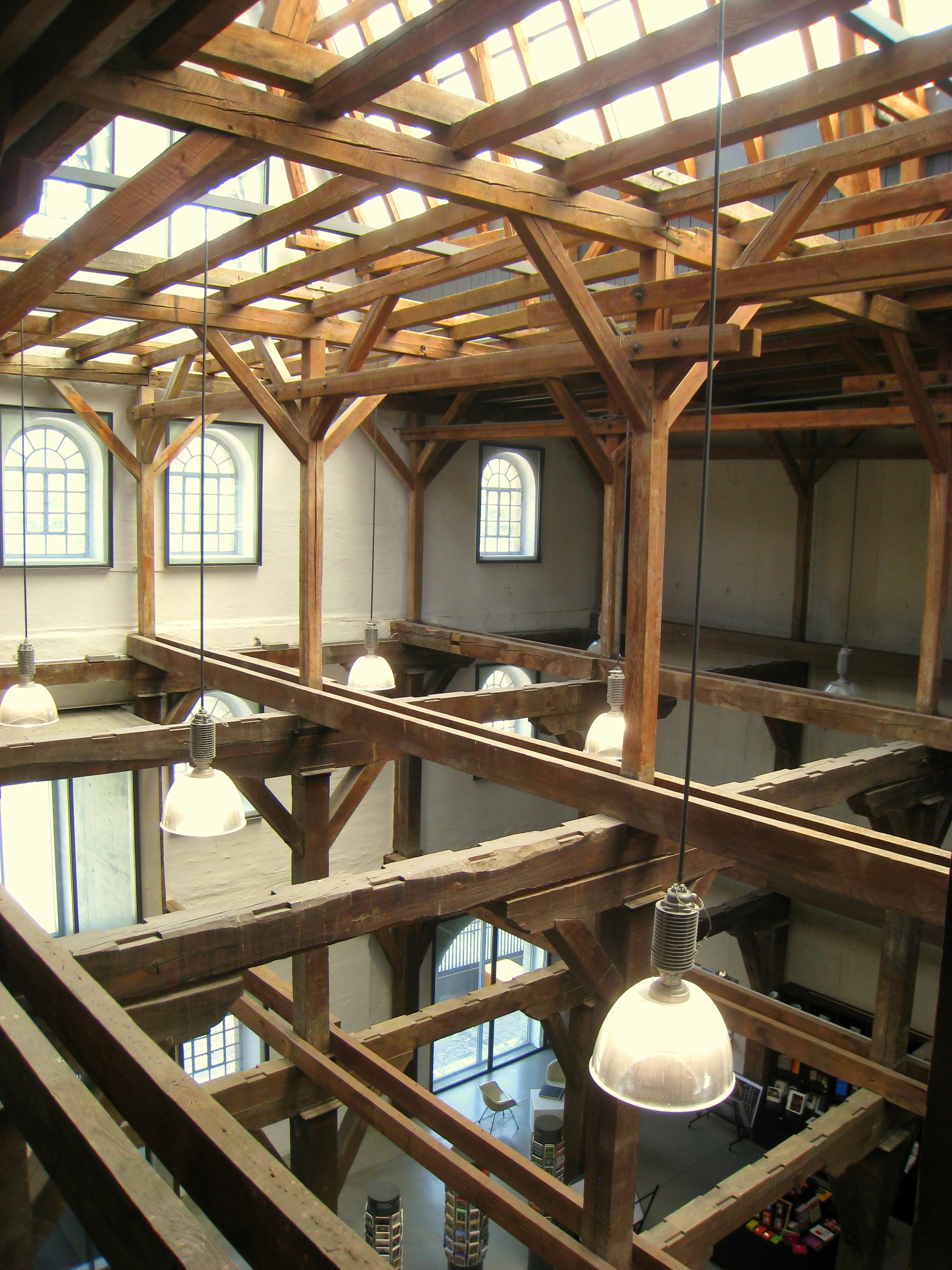
Museum im Kulturspeicher Würzburg, interior view

Museum im Kulturspeicher Würzburg

The Museum im Kulturspeicher in Würzburg displays art from the 19th century to the present. It is located in a converted river-side warehouse since 2002. After the previous director Marlene Lauter retired after nearly 30 years of service, the art historian Luisa Heese took over as director of the museum on September 1, 2020

On July 1, 2023, she switched to the Kunsthalle Mannheim as curator of contemporary art. At the beginning of 2024, Marcus Hurttig did become the museum's new director. He has been employed as curator for modern and contemporary art at the Museum der bildenden Künste Leipzig since 2011.

The museum opened in 2002 after a thorough renovation of the former grain silo which had been built of natural stone It contains two distinct collections: the municipal art collection, founded in 1941 as the Städtische Galerie - originally located in Hofstraße; and the Peter C. Ruppert Collection of European concrete art from World War II to the present day.

The municipal collection exhibits regional art, primarily from Franconia and Southern Germany, ranging from Biedermeier-style portraits and landscapes of the first half of the 19th century, through German impressionism and painters of the Berlin Secession, including Robert Breyer, Philipp Franck, Walter Leistikow, Joseph Oppenheimer, and Max Slevogt, as well as members of the Weimar Saxon-Grand Ducal Art School including Ludwig von Gleichen-Rußwurm and Franz Bunke. It also includes works by Bauhaus painter Hans Reichel and works from the estate of sculptor Emy Roeder, as well as about 30,000 graphics works.

The Ruppert collection includes concrete art from 22 European countries, incorporating a broad spectrum of materials and media, exhibited within six galleries (1,850 m^{2} total area). Artists include Max Bill, John Carter, Andreas Christen, Ralph Eck, Christoph Freimann, Gerhard von Graevenitz, Erwin Heerich, Malcolm Hughes, Norbert Kricke, Richard Paul Lohse, Maurizio Nannucci, Nausika Pastra, Henry Prosi, Bridget Riley, Peter Sedgley, and Anton Stankowski.

== See also ==
- Peter C. Ruppert Collection
- Peter C. Ruppert Prize for Concrete Art in Europe
