= Walter Passarge =

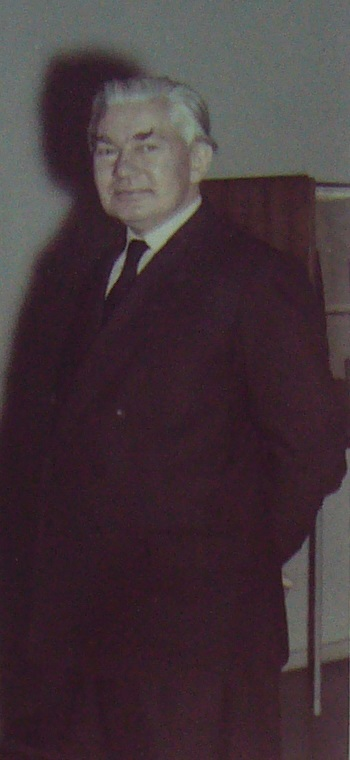
Walter Passarge (1957)

Walter Passarge (born May 23, 1898 in Erfurt; † July 30, 1958 in Mannheim) was a German art historian and Director of the Städtischen Kunsthalle Mannheim.

== Career ==
Passarge studied art history and received his doctorate in 1923 at the University of Leipzig under Wilhelm Pinder with a thesis on the German Vesper image in the Middle Ages. He initially worked as an art historian at the Museum in Erfurt from 1922 to 1925, then until 1927 as a lecturer at the State Art Academy in Kassel and until 1936 as assistant director at the Thaulow Museum and as a lecturer at the craft school in Kiel. From July 1, 1936 until his death, he was director of the city art gallery in Mannheim (Städtischen Kunsthalle Mannheim). During his time at the Kunsthalle Mannheim there, he was mainly concerned with the second wave of Nazi confiscations in 1937 and their influence on the selection of the art on display. He shifted the focus of the Mannheim Kunsthalle to the politically less sensitive arts and crafts. After the Second World War, it was up to him to rebuild the Kunsthalle, which had been greatly reduced by the effects of National Socialism and World War II, with a special focus on German and modern art as well as the collections of the 19th and 20th centuries. He published widely on a wide variety of art-historical topics.

== Literature ==
- Gustav Friedrich Hartlaub: Walter Passarge †. In: Mannheimer Hefte. 1958, 2, S. 38–39.
