= Kunsthalle Mannheim =

Art museum in Mannheim, Germany

Coordinates: 49°28′58″N 8°28′31″E

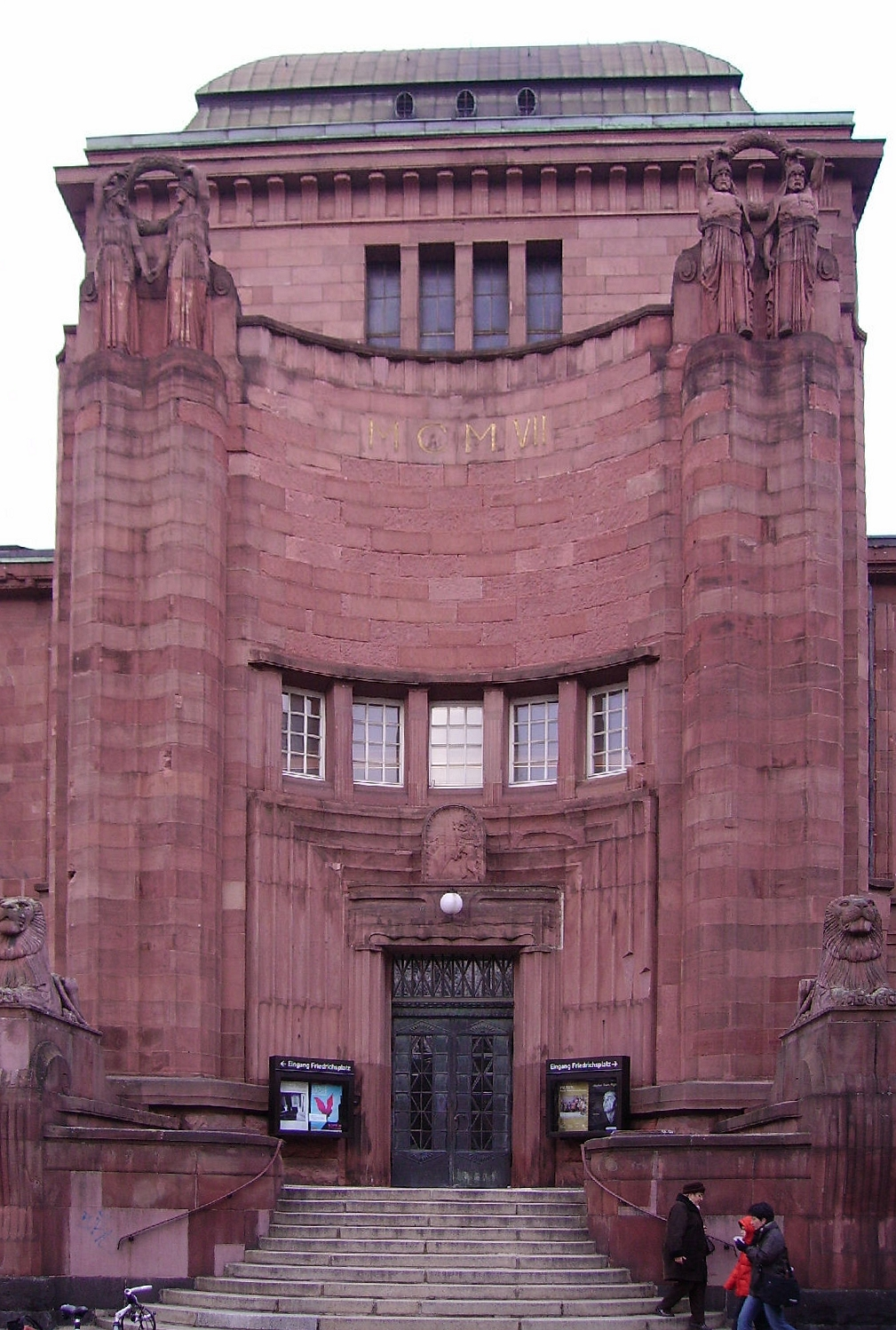
- Established: 1907
- Location: Mannheim, Germany
- Director: Johan Holten
- Website: kuma.art

The Kunsthalle Mannheim is a museum of modern and contemporary art, built in 1907, established in 1909 and located in Mannheim, Germany. Since then it has housed the city's art collections as well as temporary exhibitions – and up to 1927 those of the local Mannheimer Kunstverein as well as its administration.

== Collection ==
The Kunsthalle's own collection comprises around 1,500 works by artists including Édouard Manet, Paul Cézanne, George Grosz and Wassily Kandinsky. The extension building from 2018 shows a major collection of works by Anselm Kiefer, 38 pieces on long-term loan from the businessman Hans Grothe.

== Architecture ==
Designed by Hermann Billing, the building was erected as a temporary structure to serve an "International Art Exhibition" of 1907, commemorating the 300th anniversary of the foundation of the city. Originally meant to be torn down after this exhibition, the building was later transformed into a municipal art gallery. In 1909 the museum and the collection were opened under the first director Fritz Wichert.

In 1983 Heinz Fuchs, Director of the Kunsthalle from 1959, handed over an extension building, designed especially for the sculpture collection by architect Hans Mitzlaff, to his successor Manfred Fath.

A new building, 13,000 sq ft (1,200 m^{2}) in size with seven exhibition halls and a 22m-high glass-roofed atrium designed by the Hamburg-based architects Gerkan, Marg and Partners opened in 2018. The concrete, glass and steel structure is enveloped in a bronze mesh.

== Directors of Kunsthalle Mannheim ==
- 1909–1923 Fritz Wichert
- 1923–1933 Gustav Friedrich Hartlaub
- 1933–1959 Walter Passarge
- 1959–1983 Heinz Fuchs
- 1984–2002 Manfred Fath
- 2002–2007 Rolf Lauter
- 2008–2019 Ulrike Lorenz
- Since 2019 Johan Holten As of 1 June 2025, Luisa Heese will be deputy director.

Fritz Wichert (1909–1923)

Fritz Wichert, who completed his doctorate in 1907 in Freiburg, became director of the Kunsthalle in Mannheim as early as 1909, where he expanded the collection to include paintings from the 19th century with a focus on French Modernism. In the First World War Wichert belonged to the diplomatic service. After the war, he returned to the Mannheim Kunsthalle and now put the collection focus on the Expressionists. In 1923, Wichert was appointed as director of the Städelschule in Frankfurt.

Gustav Friedrich Hartlaub (1923–1933)

Fritz Wichert brought Hartlaub 1913 as an employee to the Kunsthalle Mannheim. In 1923 he became its director. He was particularly committed to promoting contemporary art and expressionism. With the exhibition "Neue Sachlichkeit – Deutsche Malerei seit dem Expressionismus" (New Objectivity – German Painting since Expressionism), which opened on 14 June 1925, he coined the term New Objectivity. On 20 March 1933, he was dismissed in the course of National Socialist cultural policy.

Walter Passarge (1933–1959)

From 1 July 1936 until his death Passarge was director of the Kunsthalle Mannheim. From 1937 until 1945 he dealt mainly with the second wave of seizures by the National Socialists and he saw himself exposed to the "purification of the museums of degenerate art." At that time he shifted the focus of the Kunsthalle on the politically less tangible arts and crafts. After World War II, it was up to him to rebuild the Kunsthalle's holdings, which had been severely curtailed by the effects of National Socialism and the World War, paying special attention to German and modern art as well as the collections of the 19th and 20th centuries. Only from 1949 parts of the collection could be shown again after the repair of the heavily damaged main building.

Heinz Fuchs (1959–1983)

Fuchs received his doctorate in art history in 1939 and worked as a curator since 1947 at the Kunsthalle Mannheim under the director Walter Passarge. From 1959 to 1984 he was director of the Kunsthalle. During this time he was able to substantially expand the remarkable collection of sculptures as well as paintings of the 20th century – often without the support of political bodies. During his tenure, the extension building of the Kunsthalle was opened in 1983.

Manfred Fath (1984–2002)

In 1984 Manfred Fath became director. From 1999, thanks to a generous donation from the H. W. & J. Hector Foundation, he was able to expand the exhibition space with the converted adjoining former bunker and received a generous financial endowment for the exhibition budgets through Kunsthallen Ausstellungs GmbH.

Rolf Lauter (2002–2007)

From 2002, new director Rolf Lauter abolished the chronological presentation and developed constellations and groups of works from various media (painting, sculpture, object, drawing, photography, installation, video), historical times and cultural origins on the basis of a cross-over structure. With Full House: Faces of a Collection (2006) and 100 Years Kunsthalle Mannheim (2007) two comprehensive new presentations of the Mannheim museum collection took place. In the autumn of 2007, Lauter was released from the municipal council for alleged financial irregularities by the management of the Kunsthalle and simultaneously entrusted with the position of Cultural Representative for the Visual Arts of the City of Mannheim (2008–2009).

Ulrike Lorenz (2008–2019)

In 2008, the art historian Ulrike Lorenz became director of the Kunsthalle. In 2009, after a renewal in the juvenile-style building (1907) of the Kunsthalle, the collection was reopened. For this purpose, the collection was subdivided into twelve thematic spaces of different epochs of the art layer, from Romantik to Realism. By 2018, the extension building from 1983 was demolished and replaced by the larger Hector building. On 1 June 2018, the reopening of the Kunsthalle took place with a "Grand Opening" and a screening of photographs by Canadian artist Jeff Wall. In October 2018, Lorenz was elected president of the Klassik Stiftung Weimar. She took new office in August 2019.

Johan Holten (2019–)

Successor of Ulrike Lorenz as director of the Kunsthalle Mannheim is the Danish curator Johan Holten. The artworks under investigation were listed on its website.

== Nazi-looted art ==
In 2018 the Kunsthalle Mannheim found Nazi-looted art within its collection of 2,253 works. The art historian Mathias Listl explained that Wilhelm Leibl's "The Drinker" from 1874 – was acquired from a Nazi agency and that twenty-five other artworks were suspected to have been looted or obtained under duress by the Nazis. The museum published a list of artworks under investigation on its website.

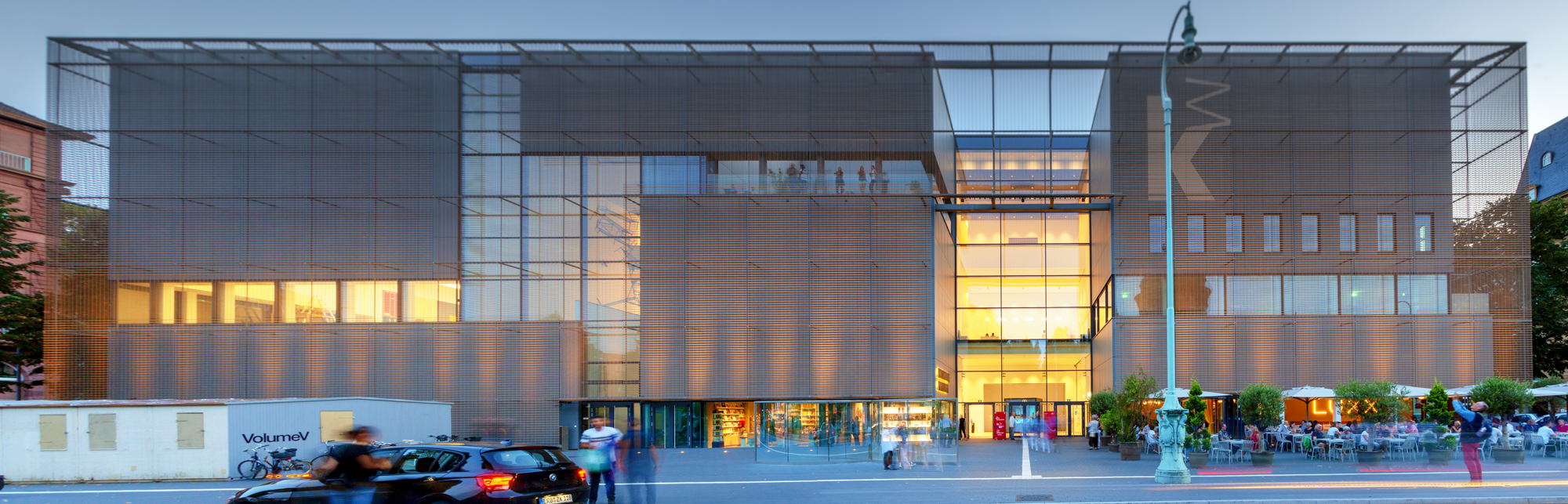
Kunsthalle Mannheim, Hector Building in 2018

== Collections ==
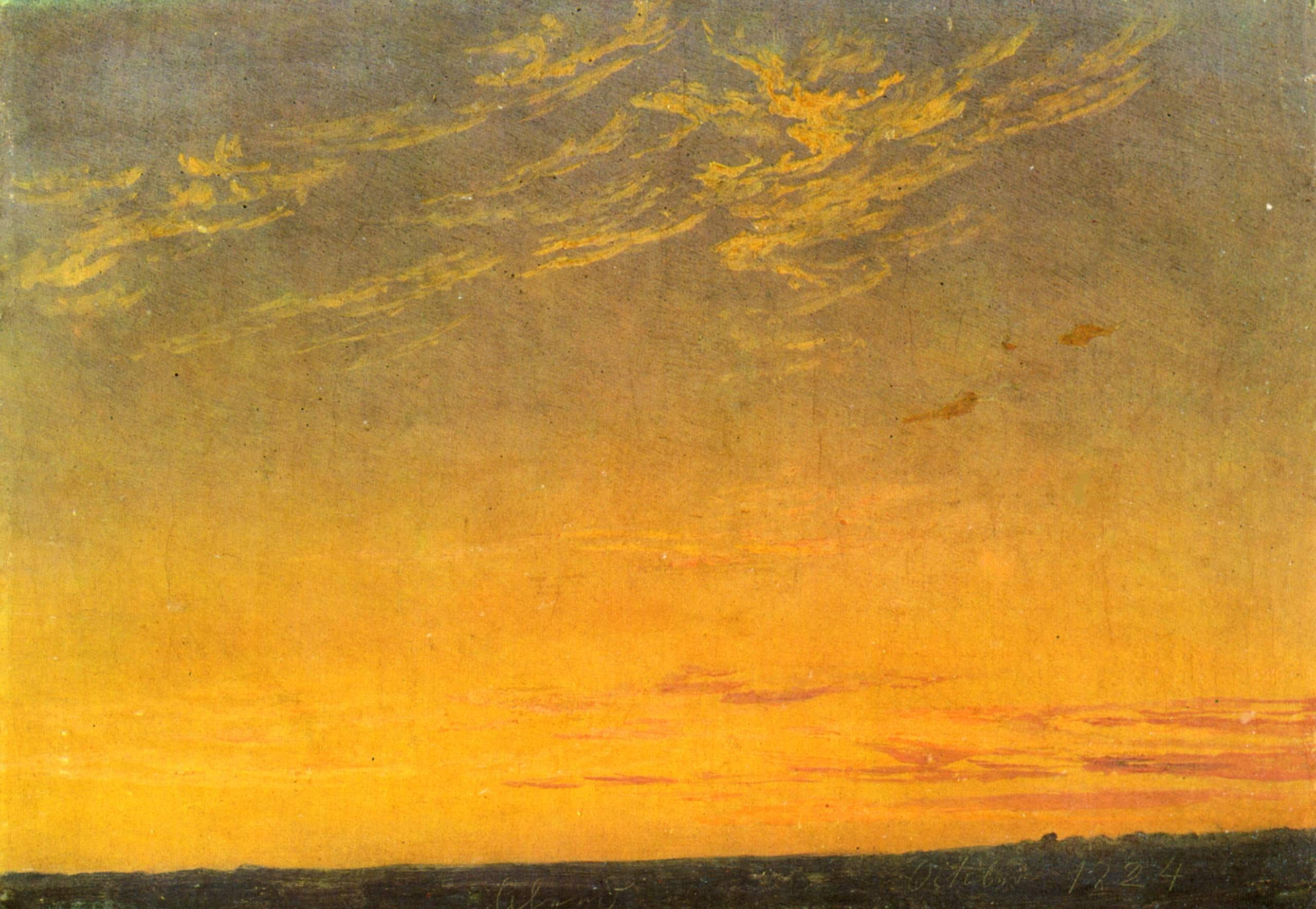
Caspar David Friedrich, Evening with clouds, 1824

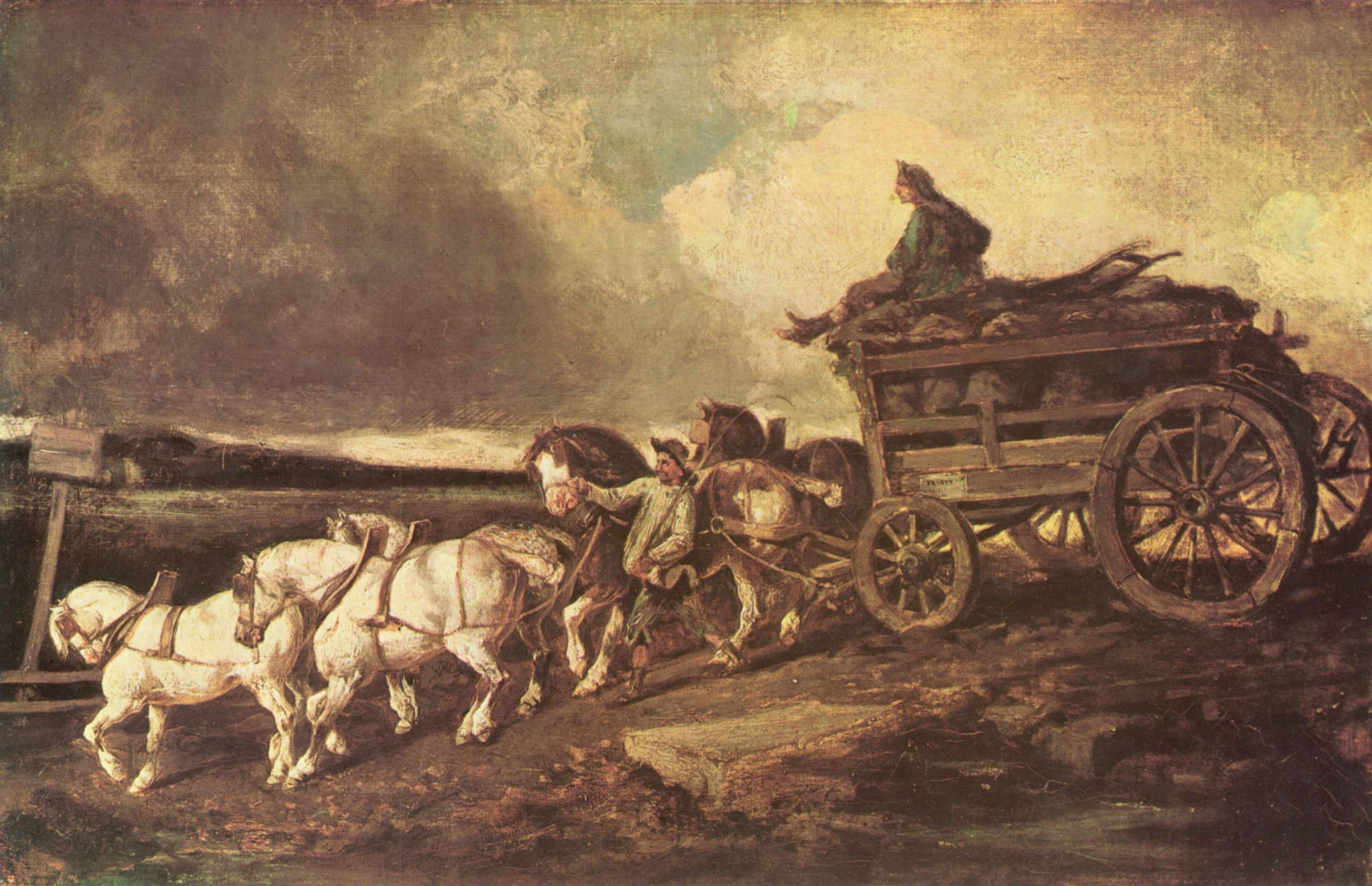
Théodore Géricault, 1821-2

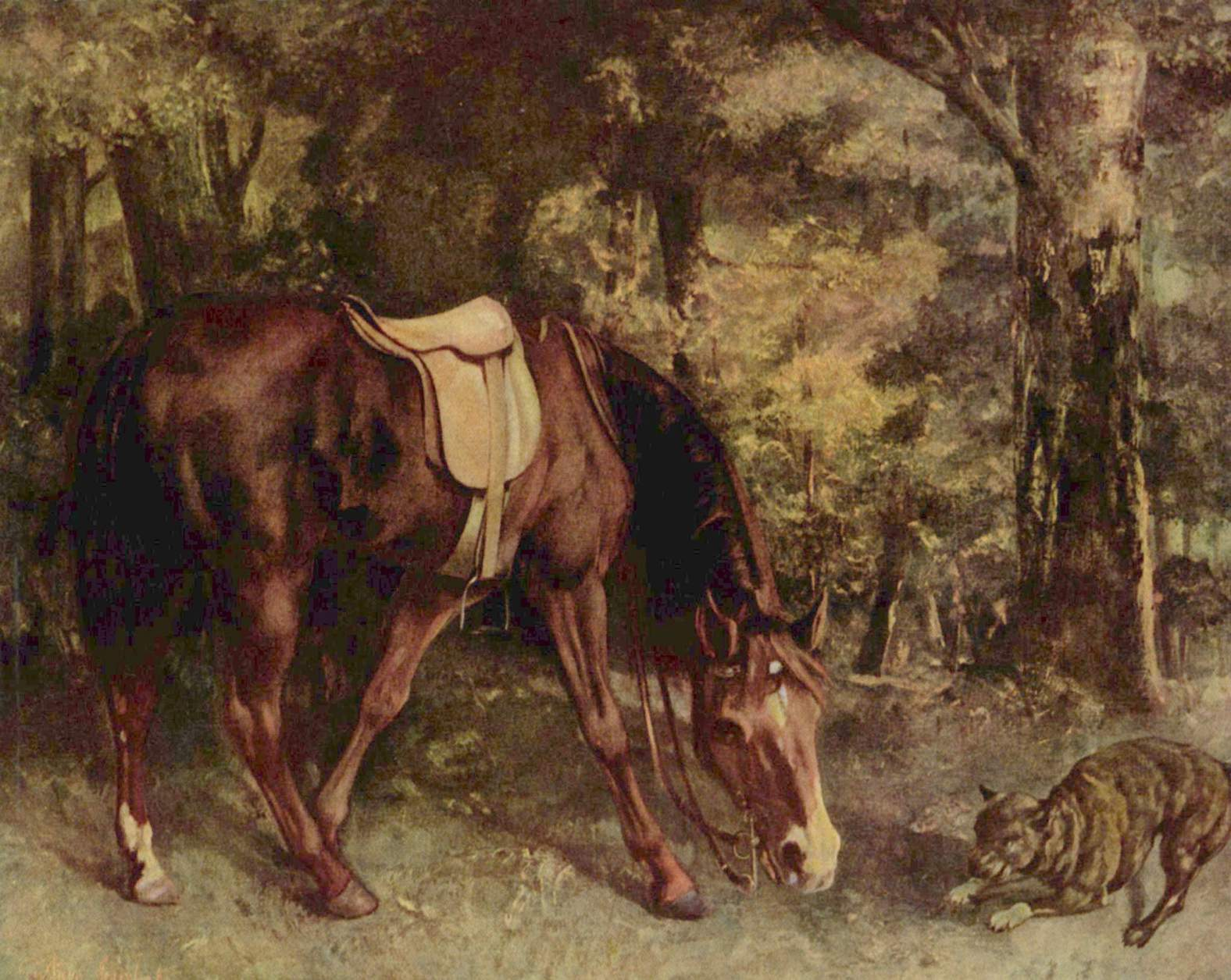
Gustave Courbet, 1863

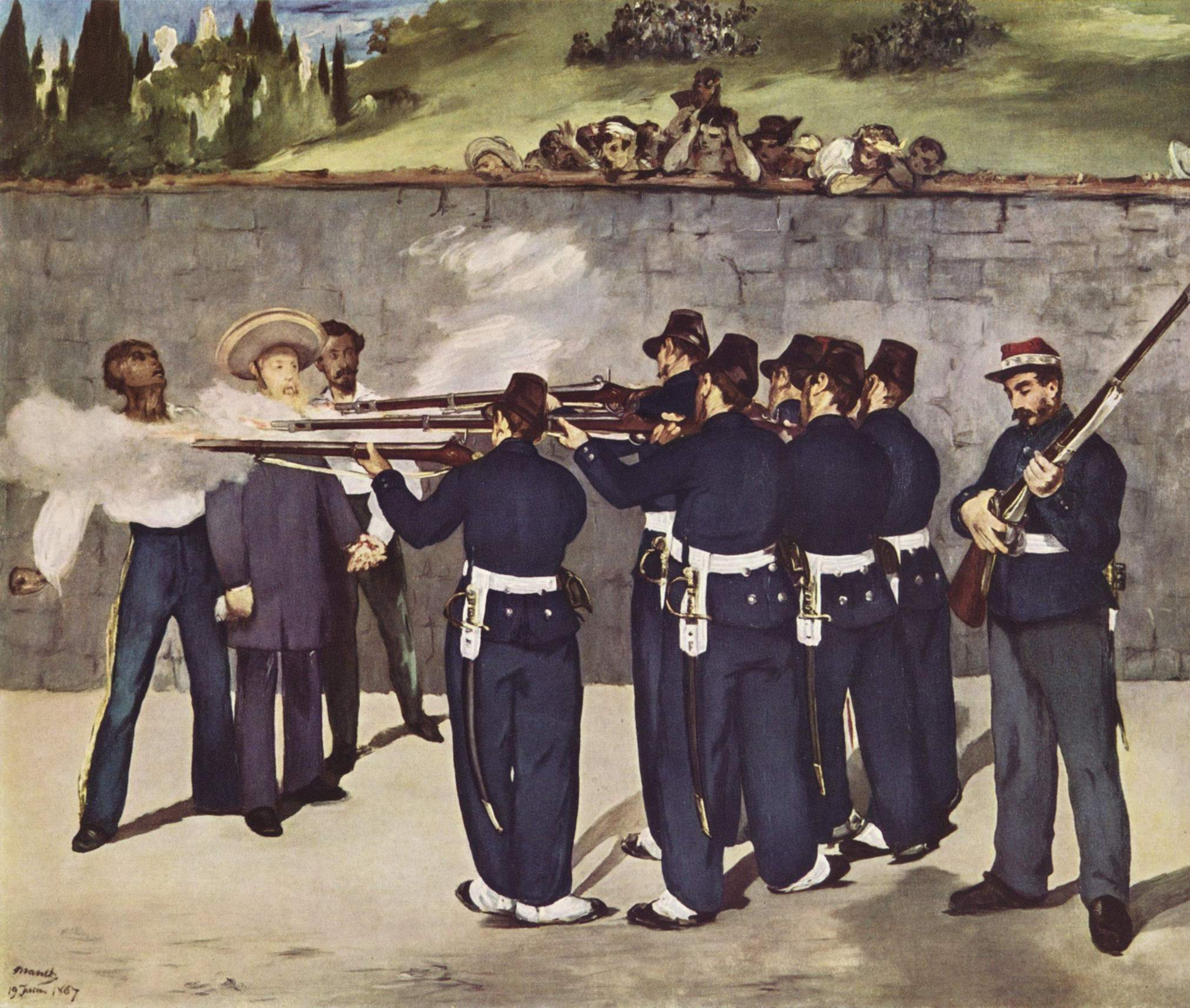
Édouard Manet, The Execution of Emperor Maximilian, 1868-9

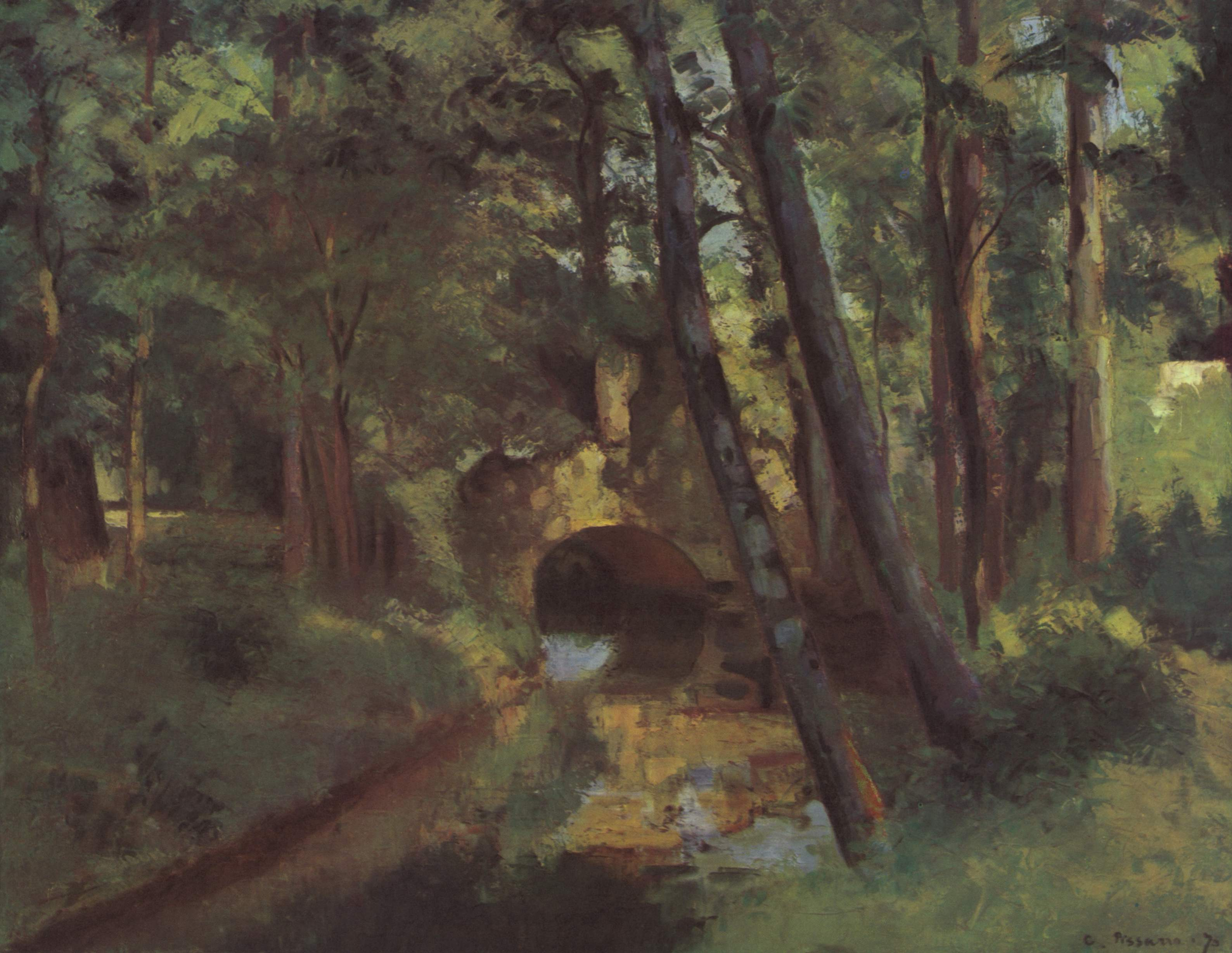
Camille Pissarro, 1875

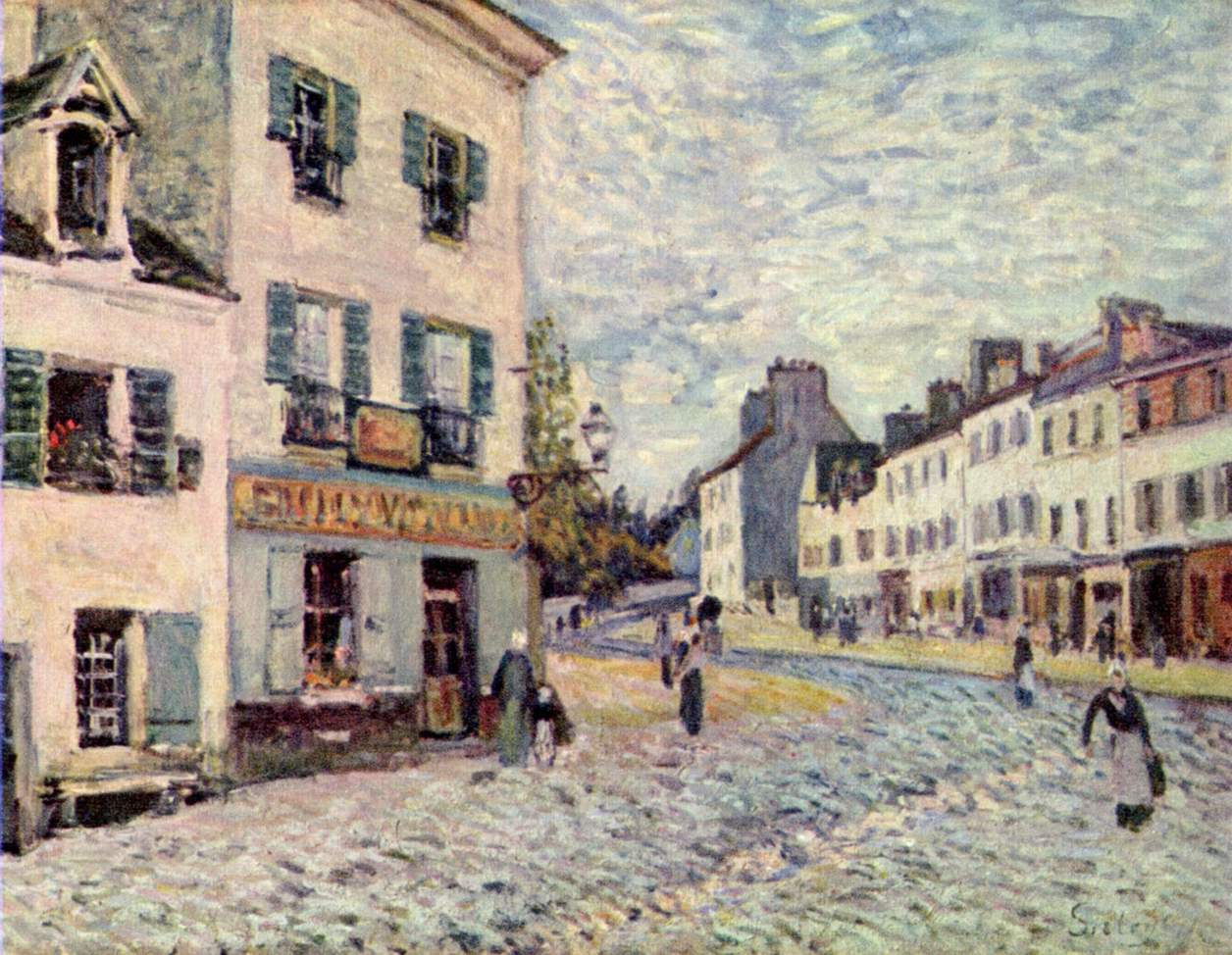
Alfred Sisley, Street in Marly, 1876

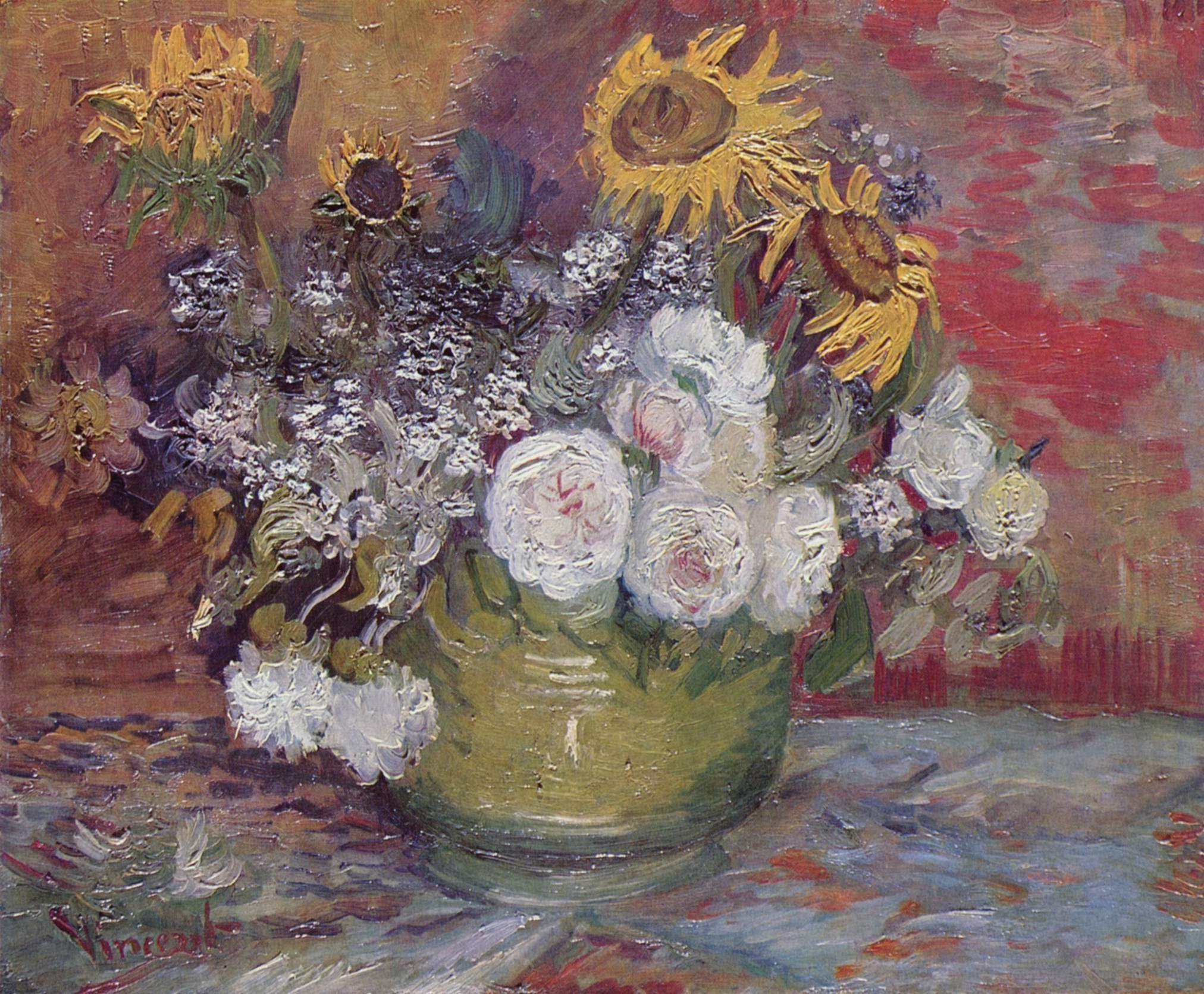
Vincent van Gogh, Roses and Sunflowers, 1886

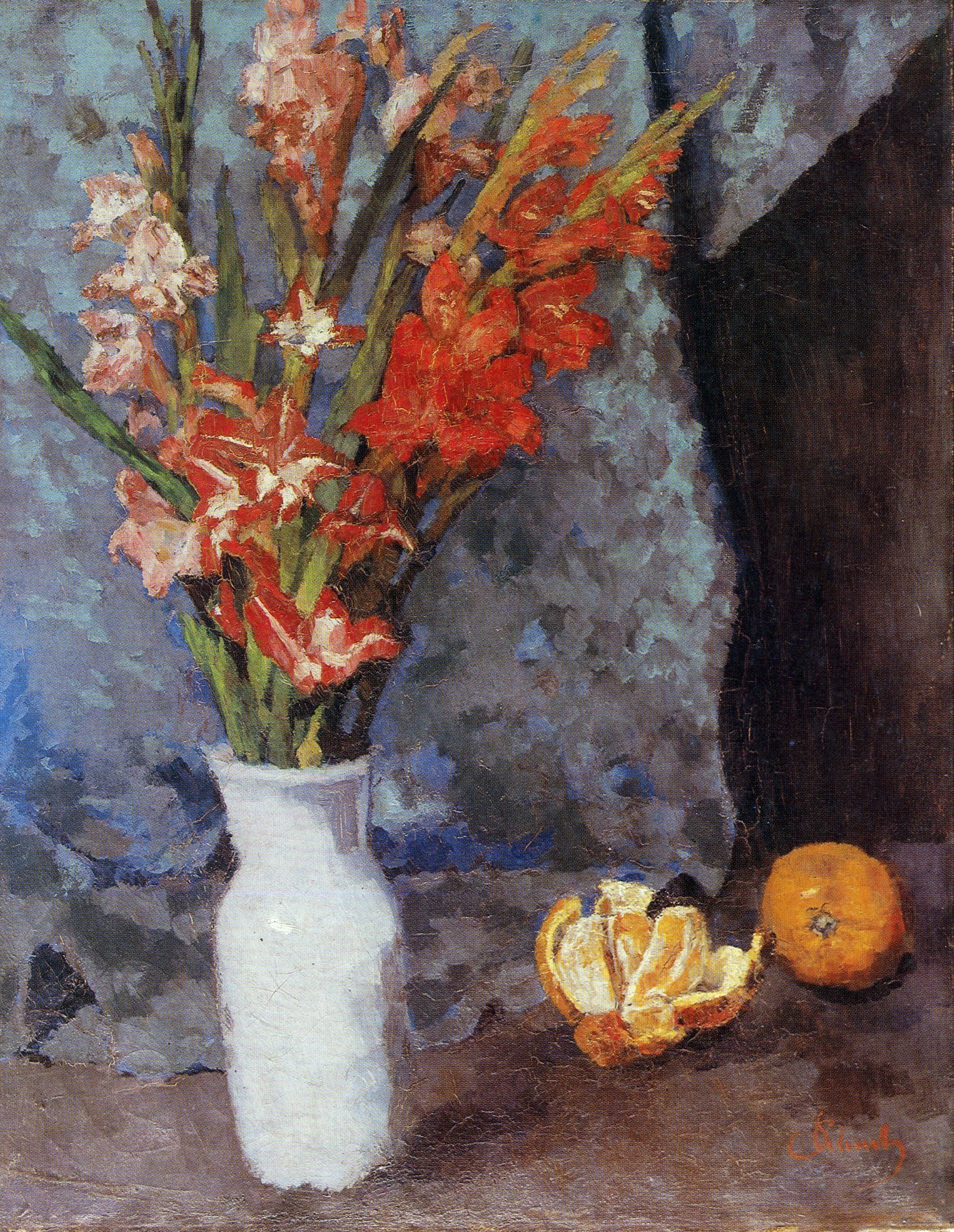
Carl Schuch, Gladioli and Oranges, c. 1890

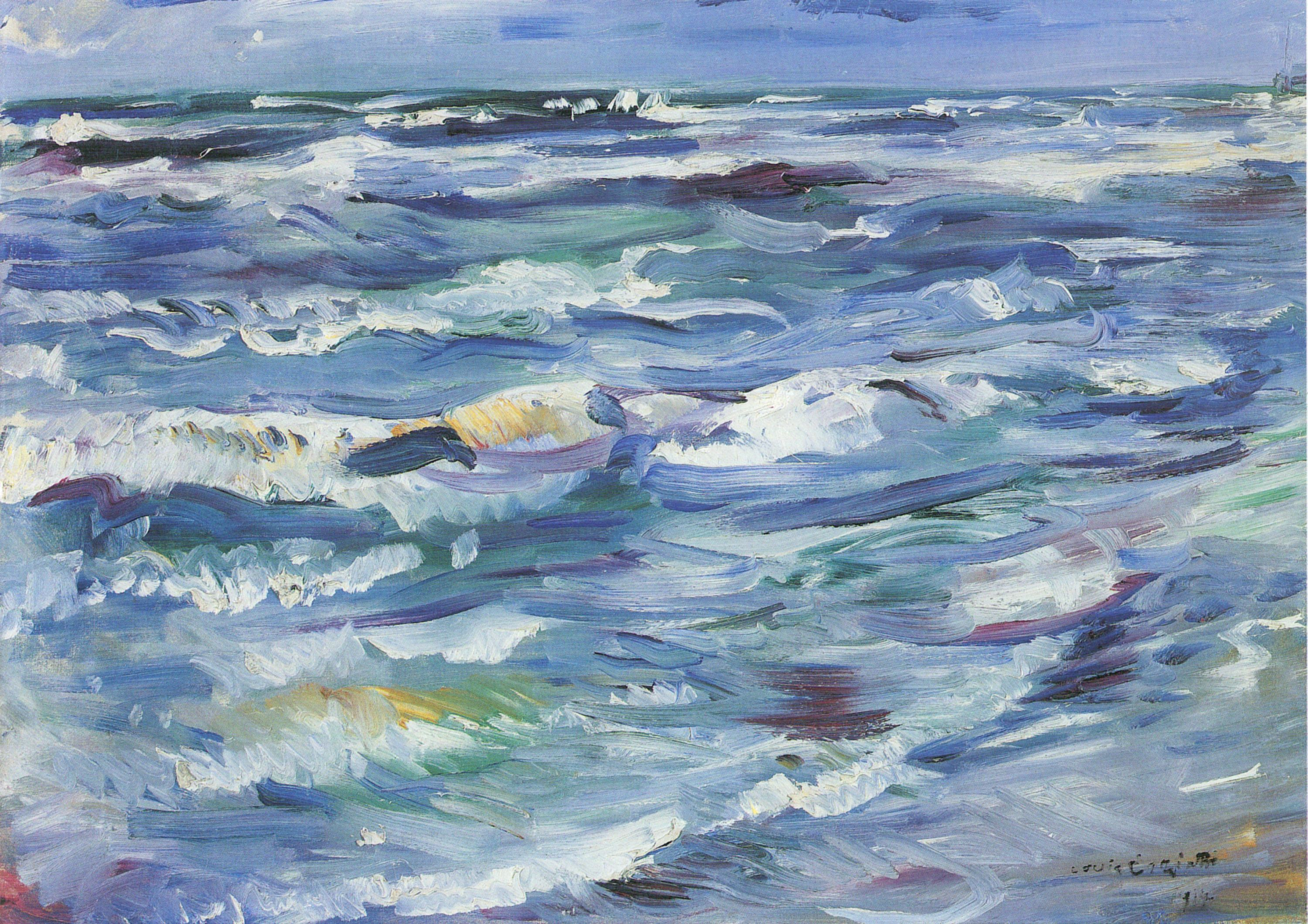
Lovis Corinth, See by La Spezia, 1914
