= Julius Binder =

German philosopher of law

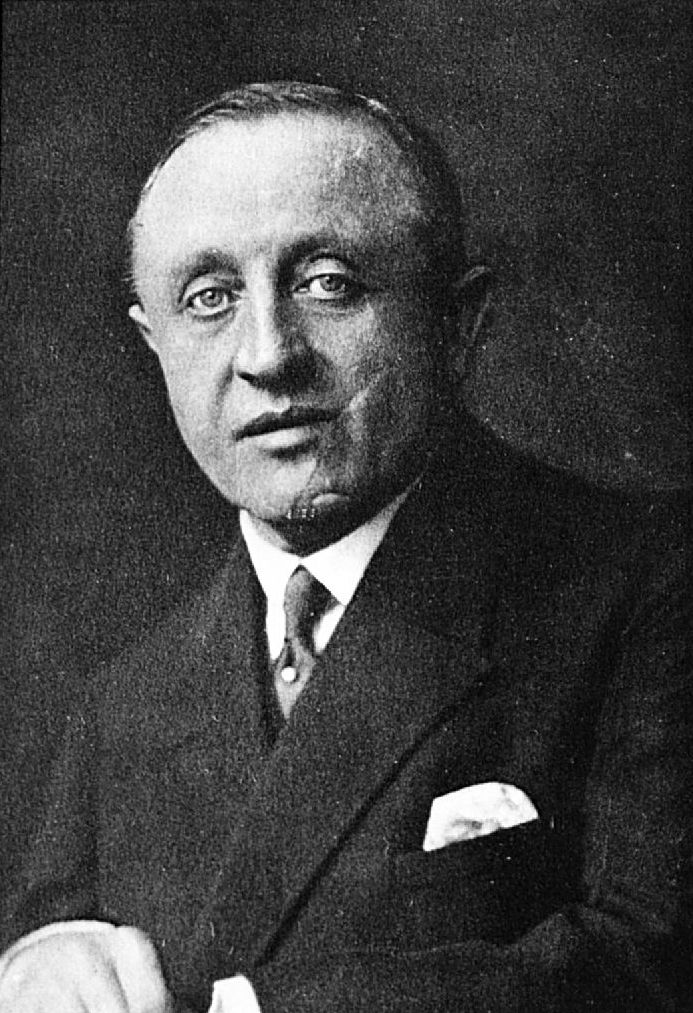
- Born: 12 May 1870; Würzburg
- Died: 28 August 1939 (aged 69); Göttingen
- Citizenship: Germany
- Occupation: Philosopher of law (German: Rechtsphilosoph)
- Political party: Corps Bavaria Würzburg

Julius Binder (12 May 1870–28 August 1939) was a German philosopher of law. He is principally known as an opponent of legal positivism, and for having remained as an active scholar during the 1930s in Nazi Germany who did not speak out against the prevailing government of that time.

== Life ==
Julius Binder was born in Würzburg on 12 May 1870, then part of the North German Confederation. He joined the Corps Bavaria Würzburg political party in 1890 and stayed in it the rest of his life. Binder studied law in Würzburg with honors (1894) and earned his habilitation in 1898. Afterward, he became professor in Rostock (1900), Erlangen (1903), Würzburg (1913) and eventually the University of Göttingen (1919). He participated in the founding of the Internationalen Hegelbund and became a member of the Göttingen Academy of Sciences.

In 1915, he wrote Rechtsbegriff und Rechtidee, which applied the concept of rights from Immanuel Kant to the legal system. But he later became a strong critic of neo-Kantian legal philosophy, especially the philosophy of law of Rudolf Stammler. From the 1920s, Julius Binder—and later along with Karl Larenz, Gerhard Dulckeit, and Walther Schönfeld—applied a neo-Hegelian approach to jurisprudence in the system of the so-called "objective idealism". Binder was the academic teacher of the German legal philosopher and civil law proponent Karl Larenz. Binder rejected legal positivism.

Other related influences on Binder and people he influenced include Max Pohlenz, Ludwig Prandtl, Hermann Thiersch, Hugo Willrich, and Hermann Kees.

Binder, along with Ernst Forsthoff, Carl Schmitt, Karl Larenz, and other legal philosophers, did not criticize the Nazi legal system.

Binder died in 1939 in Göttingen.

== Literary works ==
- Das Problem der Juristischen Persönlichkeit (1907)
- Rechtsbegriff und Rechtsidee, 1915
- Philosophie des Rechts, 1925
- Grundlegung zur Rechtsphilosophie, 1935
- System der Rechtsphilosophie, 1937
