= Peter C. Ruppert Collection =

Collection of Concrete art in Europe

The Peter C. Ruppert Collection of European concrete art is housed at the Museum im Kulturspeicher Würzburg in Würzburg since 2002.

The collection was initially assembled by Peter C. Ruppert (1935-2019) and later together with his wife Rosemarie. It includes around 418 works by 254 European Concrete Art artists from the end of World War II onwards from almost all parts of Europe, including Hans Arp, Max Bill, Anthony Caro, Günter Fruhtrunk, Auguste Herbin, Richard Paul Lohse, François Morellet, Bridget Riley and Victor Vasarely. One focus of the collection is Concrete Art in Germany after 1945, including works by artists of the former GDR.

Other special features within the collection are the group of works by concrete artists from Great Britain (including Barbara Hepworth and Ben Nicholson) and the section of concrete photography (with works by for example, Kilian Breier, Heinz Hajek-Halke, Heinrich Heidersberger, Gottfried Jäger, Peter Keetman, and Otto Steinert). About 250 artists from 23 European countries are included with exemplary works.

It is characteristic of Concrete art that these works do not depict the real world, but are based on the pictorial means of color, form, line, chiaroscuro, light and movement. In many cases, the artists make use of geometry or other mathematical methods in order to juxtapose the seen reality with their own, artistically autonomous one.

Since the museum was founded in 2002, the collection has been under the patronage of the respective Secretary General of the Council of Europe, since 2019 this is Marija Pejčinović Burić. The collection is continuously being expanded. Current artistic trends as well as still missing artistic positions after 1945 are added.

== See also ==
- Peter C. Ruppert Prize for Concrete Art in Europe
