= The Execution of Emperor Maximilian =

Group of paintings by Édouard Manet

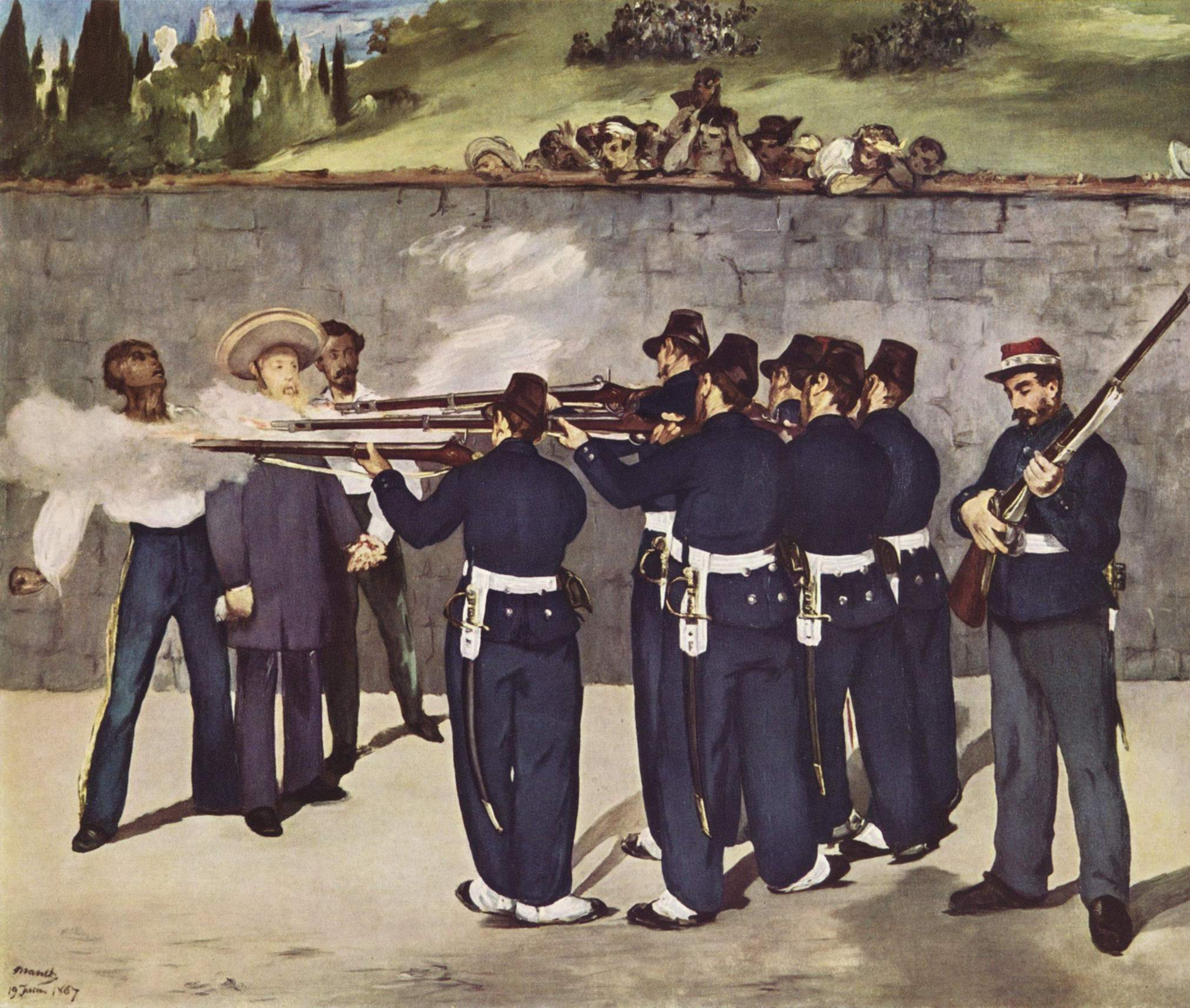
- Artist: Édouard Manet
- Year: 1868-69
- Medium: oil on canvas
- Dimensions: 252 cm × 305 cm (99 in × 120 in)
- Location: Kunsthalle Mannheim, Mannheim, Germany

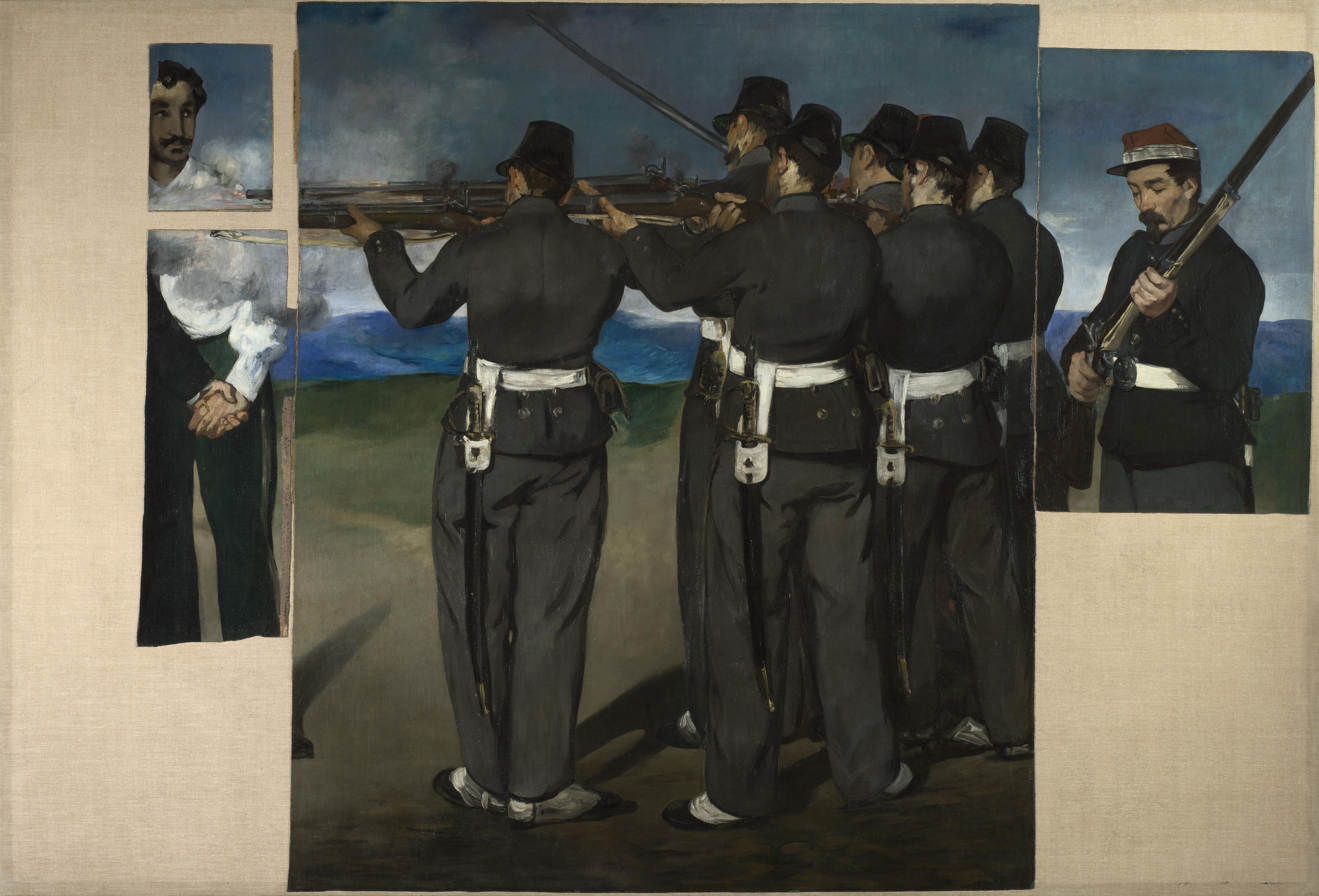
The Execution of Emperor Maximilian (1867–1868), oil on canvas. National Gallery, London

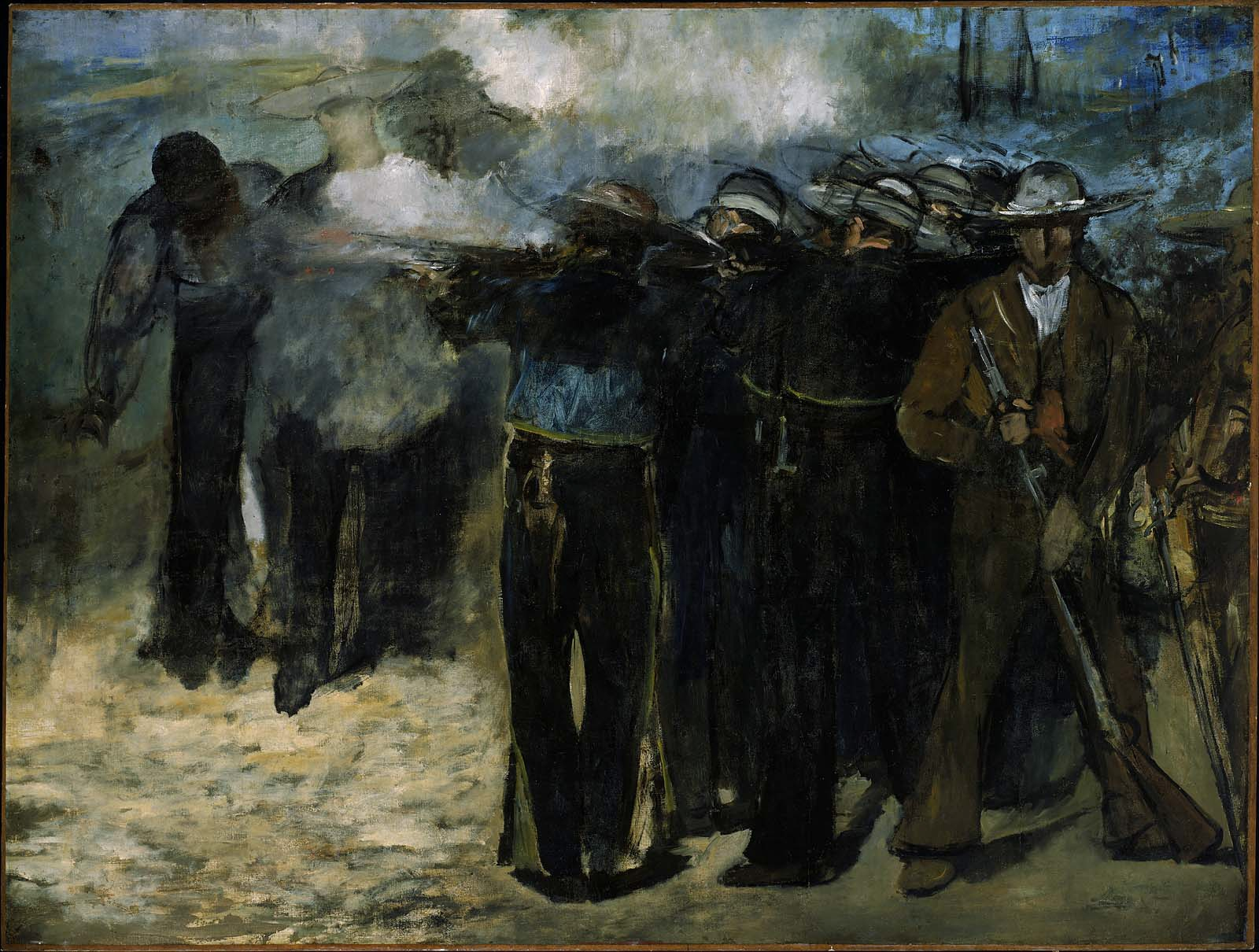
The Execution of Emperor Maximilian (1867), oil on canvas, 195.9 × 259.7 cm. Museum of Fine Arts, Boston

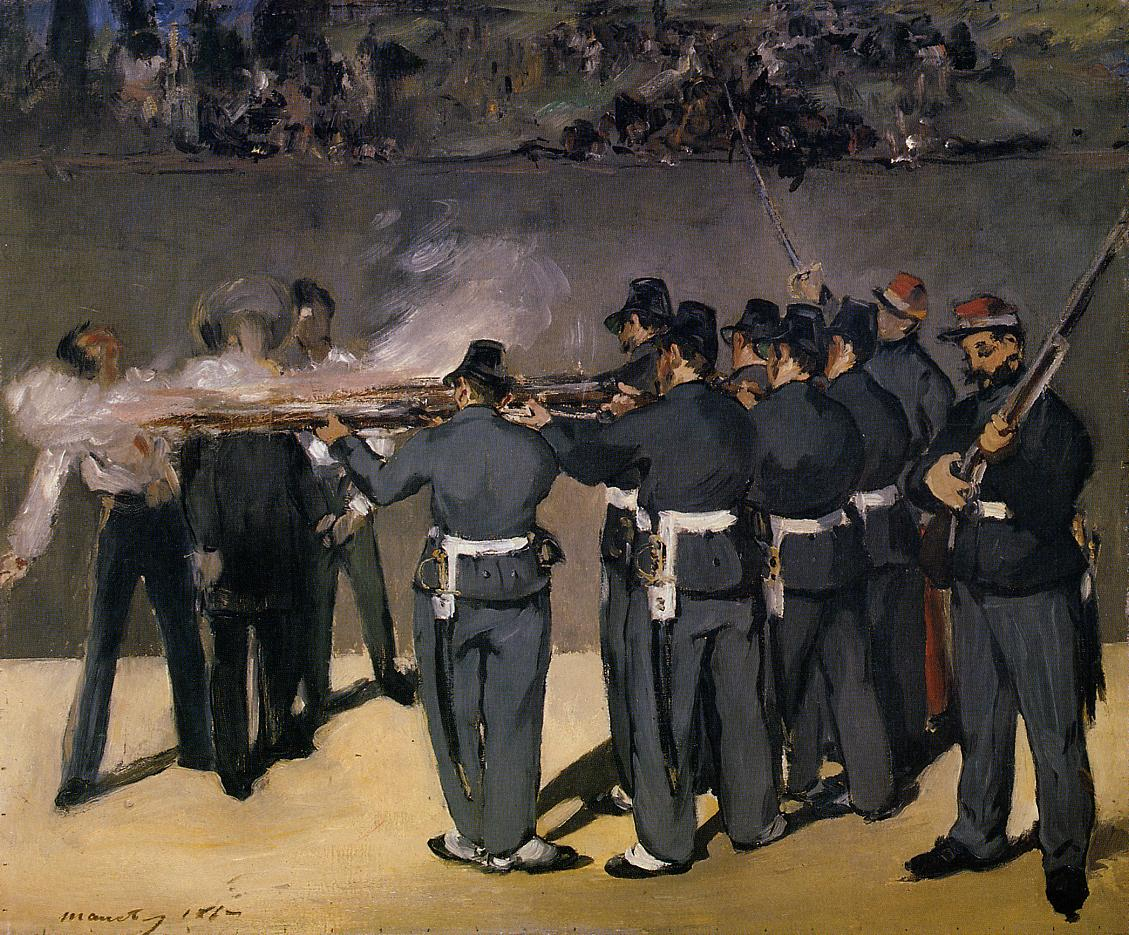
The Execution of Emperor Maximilian (1867), oil on canvas, 48 × 58 cm. Ny Carlsberg Glyptotek, Copenhagen

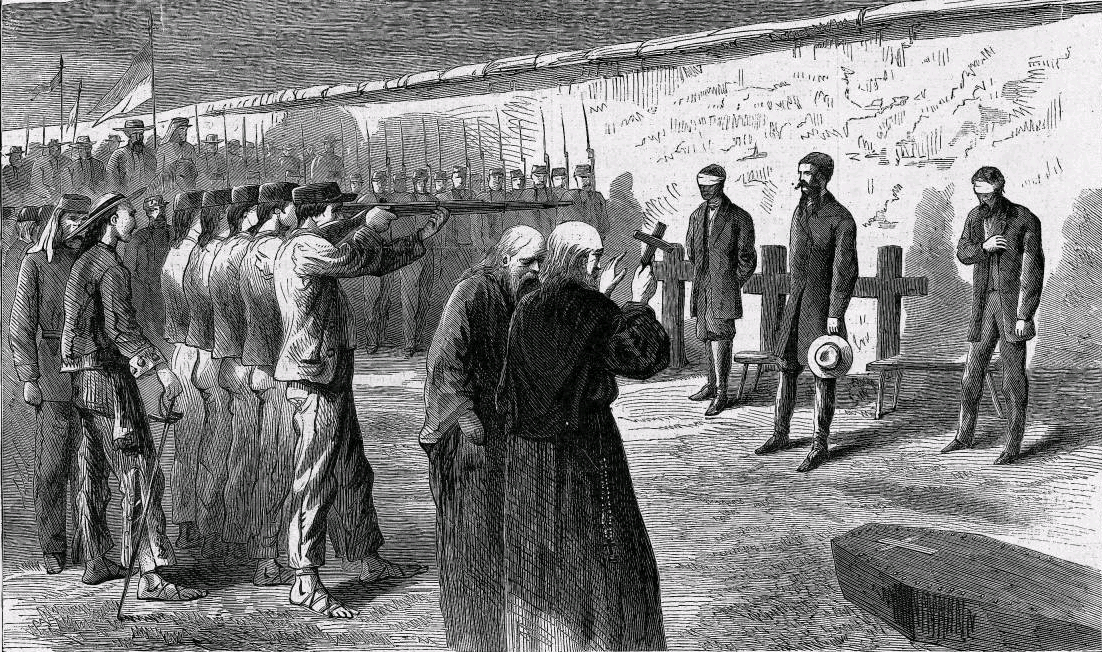
Print of the execution of Maximilian in Santiago de Querétaro, Mexico

The Execution of Emperor Maximilian is a series of paintings by Édouard Manet from 1867 to 1869, depicting the execution by firing squad of Emperor Maximilian I of the short-lived Second Mexican Empire. Manet produced three large oil paintings, a smaller oil sketch and a lithograph of the same subject. All five works were brought together for an exhibition in London and Mannheim in 1992–1993 and at the Museum of Modern Art in New York in 2006.

== History ==
Maximilian was born in 1832, the second son of Archduke Franz Karl of Austria of the House of Habsburg and Princess Sophie of Bavaria. After a career in the Austrian Navy, he was encouraged by Napoleon III to become Emperor of Mexico following the French intervention in Mexico. Maximilian arrived in Mexico in May 1864. He faced significant opposition from forces loyal to the deposed president Benito Juárez throughout his reign, and the Empire collapsed after Napoleon withdrew French troops in 1866.

Maximilian was captured on Cerro de las Campanas in May 1867, sentenced to death at a court martial, and executed, together with Generals Miguel Miramón and Tomás Mejía, on 19 June 1867.

Manet supported the Republican cause, particularly as represented by Léon Gambetta, but was inspired to start work on a painting, heavily influenced by Goya's The Third of May 1808. The final work, painted in 1868–1869 is now held by the Kunsthalle Mannheim. The painting is signed by Manet in the lower left corner, bearing the date of Maximilian's execution in 1867, not when the work was completed 1868–1869.

Fragments of an earlier and larger painting from about 1867–1868 are held by the National Gallery in London. Parts of that work were probably cut off by Manet, but it was largely complete on his death. Other parts were sold separately after his death. The surviving pieces were reassembled by Edgar Degas and they were bought by the National Gallery in 1918, then separated again until 1979, and finally combined on one canvas in 1992.

A third, unfinished, oil painting is held by the Museum of Fine Arts, Boston, donated from Mr. and Mrs. Frank Gair Macomber in 1930, who bought it from Ambroise Vollard in 1909. A much smaller work in oils, the study for the Mannheim painting is held by the Ny Carlsberg Glyptotek in Copenhagen.

Manet was refused permission to reproduce the lithograph in 1869, but an edition of 50 impressions was produced in 1884, after his death. Examples of the lithograph are held by the Metropolitan Museum of Art in New York and the Clark Art Institute in Williamstown, Massachusetts.

In the Boston version of the painting, the soldiers wear clothes and sombrero of Mexican Republicans. In the final version in Mannheim, "[t]he soldiers in the painting wear uniforms almost identical to French troops, and the man preparing for the coup de grâce shares the conspicuous features of Napoleon III. The implication was clear: Napoleon III had blood on his hands. Unsurprisingly, the painting was banned from public display in Paris" during the reign of Napoleon III, but the Mannheim version was exhibited in New York and Boston in 1879–1880, brought there by Manet's friend, the opera singer Émilie Ambre. The Mannheim and Boston versions were exhibited together at the Salon d'Automne in 1905. The Mannheim version was acquired by the Kunsthalle Mannheim in 1910 after it had been exhibited at the Berliner Secession earlier that year. This painting had great significance as one of Manet's only historical paintings.

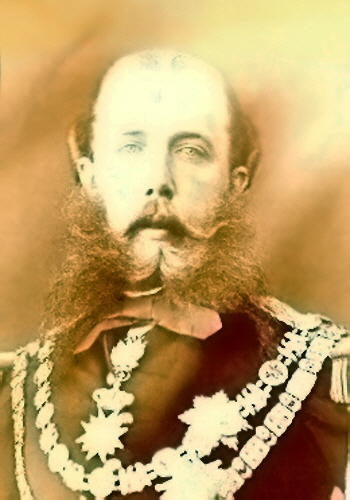
Emperor Maximilian I of Mexico, c. 1865

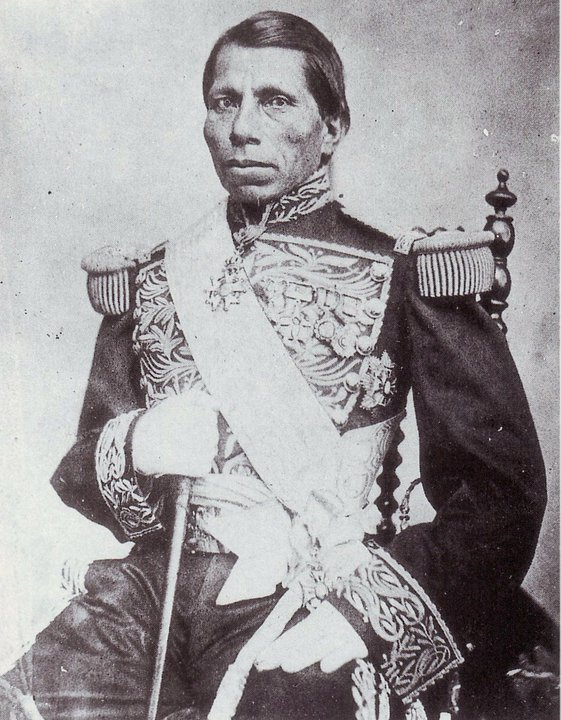
General Tomás Mejía, c. 1864

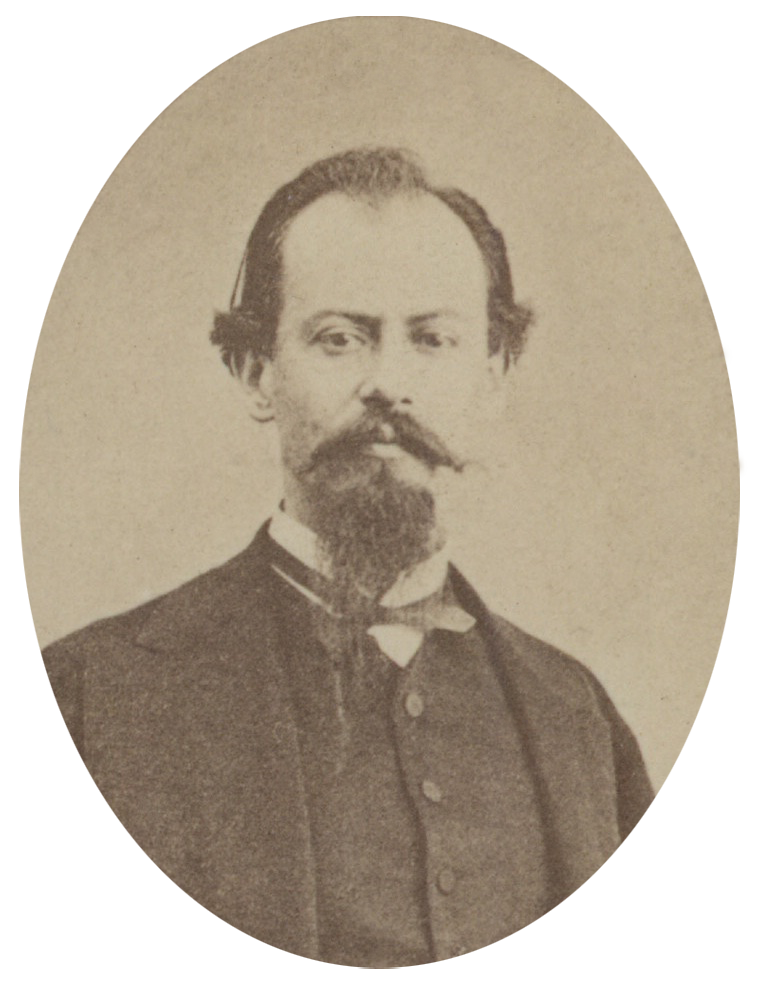
General Miguel Miramón, c. 1860s

Goya's The Third of May 1808

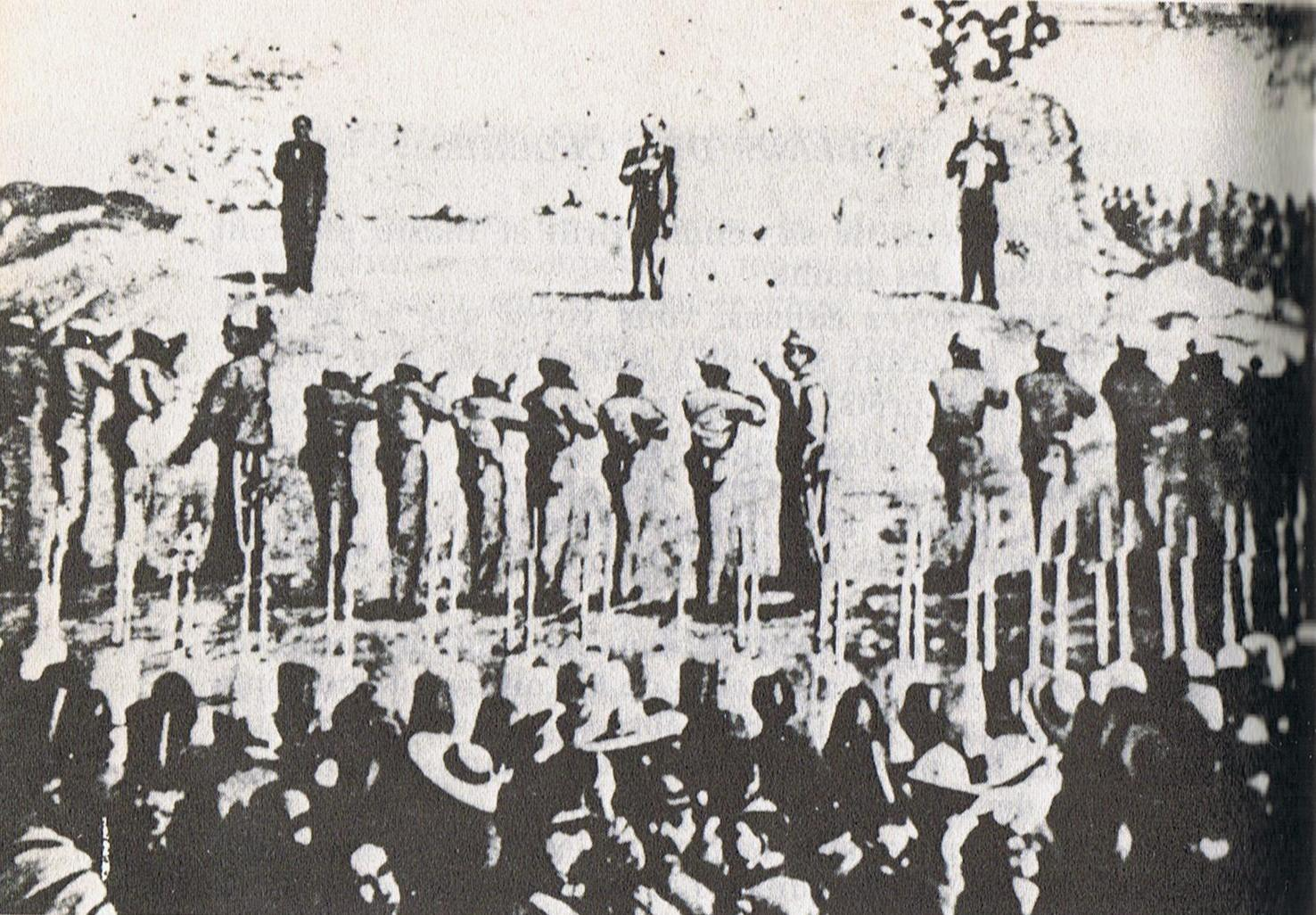
Reconstruction of the execution of Maximilian (right in photograph) Miramón (center) and Mejía (left)

== See also ==
- List of paintings by Édouard Manet
