= Dóra Maurer =

Hungarian artist (1937–2026)

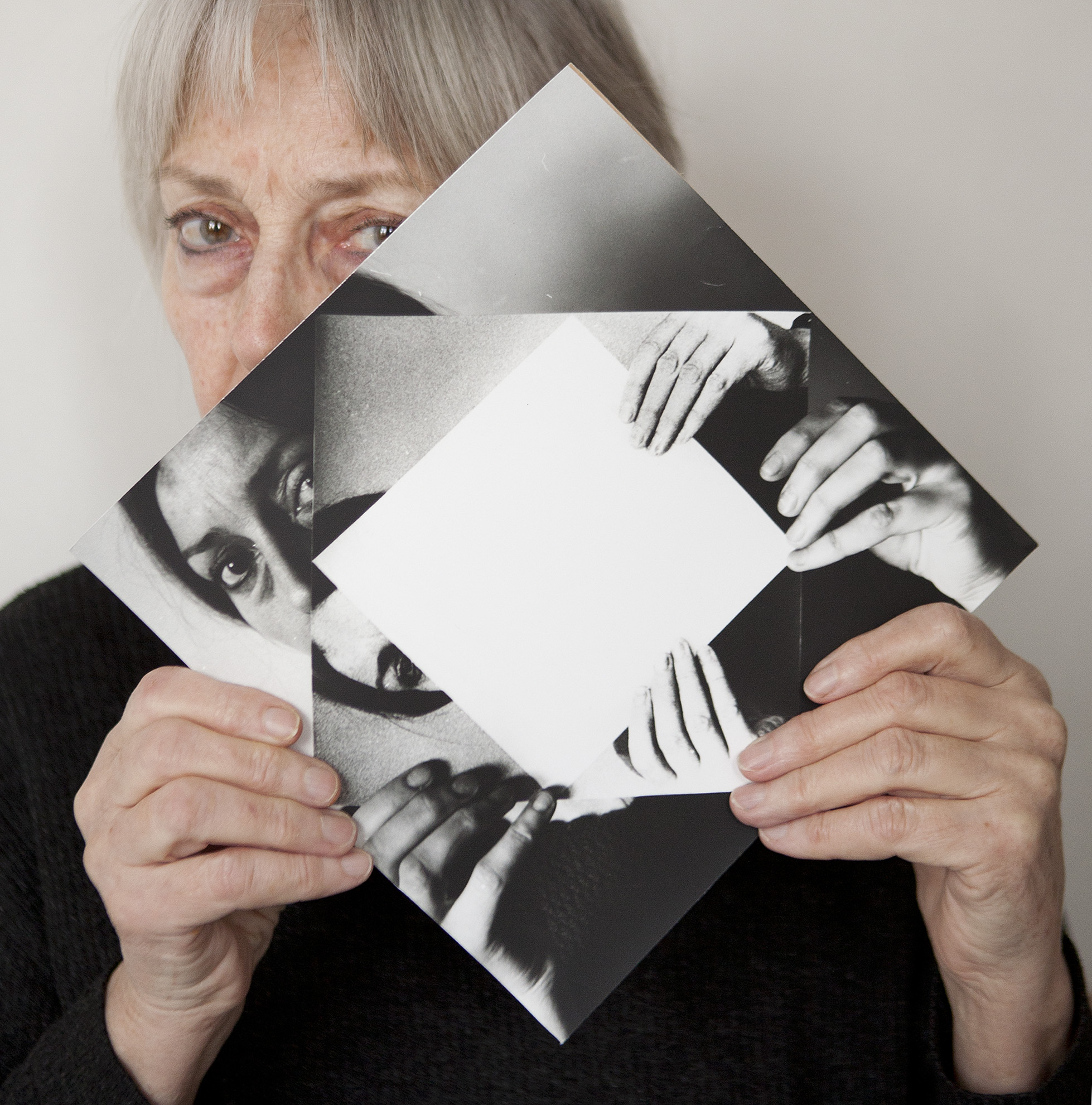
- Maurer in 2011
- Born: 11 June 1937; Budapest, Hungary
- Died: 14 February 2026 (aged 88)
- Known for: Visual art
- Website: doramaurer.com

Dóra Maurer (11 June 1937 – 14 February 2026) was a Hungarian visual artist whose career spanned more than 50 years. She worked across a wide range of visual and performance-based artistic media. Maurer first gained recognition in the 1970s for her avant-garde work and went on to develop an internationally exhibited practice influenced by both contemporary and modern art. Her work is grounded in mathematical principles and complex systems. Much of her oeuvre explores the presentation of multiple possibilities, inviting viewers to consider alternative outcomes and interpretations. Many of her works deconstruct simple actions, encouraging viewers to perceive movement itself rather than a static representation of it. In addition to her artistic practice, Maurer was an emerita professor at the University of Fine Arts in Budapest, and also worked as a curator.

== Life and career ==
Maurer was born in Budapest on 11 June 1937. Her father, Alfréd Maurer (1888–1937), was a captain in the Royal Hungarian Army, a surveyor and an aerial photographer. Her mother was Dorottya Haeffner (1899–1978).

She trained as a graphic artist in the 1950s. In the 1970s, she started to work in photography and moving images, often collaborating with musicians. She also taught creative performative workshops. She created increasingly geometric and abstract drawings and paintings in the 1970s and onwards.

From 2019 to 2020, she was the subject of a major retrospective exhibition at the Tate Modern. White Cube gallery began to represent Maurer in 2019. She was also represented by Carl Kostyál.

Maurer died on 14 February 2026, at the age of 88.

== Works ==
Dóra Maurer's artwork often reflects on geometric, mathematical, and conceptual systems as themes. These were the lenses through which her art was informed. Maurer explored different techniques to depict things such as simple actions to give the viewer the impression of movement. She gave the viewer examples of things she could do with different objects, to make them think about what they would do. All of Maurer's work displays geometric compositions and designs. She was very methodical with composition used, using images, lines, width of lines, colours, angles, and more. Some of her highly regarded works include her quasi-photos, her series Reversible and Changeable Phases of Movement, and her last series, Overlappings. A 1972 study from the Reversible and Changeable Phases of Movement series, made of 24 gelatin silver prints, is in the photography collection of the Museum of Modern Art in New York.

Maurer stated that her works are simple examples of what she could do, but critics often attach political undertones to them. In the past, people have said that her works are examples of the socialist background in which she grew up. However, Dóra Maurer did not consider her art political, nor did she bear the thought in mind when creating it. An article in ArtReview commented, "Her work was political only because at the time she made it everything was political." Most of this critique is attributed to her work done from the 1960s until the 1980s.

Maurer began to develop surreal etchings in 1961, exploring the technical possibilities of the medium. From 1969 to 1970 she began to create time-based works that explore the effects that time, space, and energy have on an event. In the experimental film Timing (1973–1980) she folds a white cloth against a black background, making it as small as possible, in a total of seven steps. As the image itself is halved, then divided in four and finally in eight, and the steps in the folding process are played at the same time, the white surfaces of the cloth merge in some places, resulting in one image.

== Exhibitions ==
=== Solo exhibitions ===
- Dóra Maurer, Carl Kostyál, London, 2015
- Museum Ritter – Snapshots, 18 October 2014 – 19 April 2015
- 6 out of 5, Curated by Katharine Kostyál, White Cube Masons Yard, 24 May 2016 – 9 July 2016
- Dóra Maurer, Curated by Katharine Kostyál, White Cube Bermondsey, 12 September 2019 – 3 November 2019
- Tate Modern, 5 August 2019 – 5 July 2020
- Dóra Maurer – SUMUS – We Are Together, De Appel, Amsterdam, 8 July – 23 September 2023

=== Group exhibitions ===
- For Pete’s Sake. Carl Kostyál, Stockholm, 2016
- Women in Abstraction. 2021 exhibition at the Centre Pompidou
