= Shinji =

- Pronunciation: shín-jí
- Gender: Male

Origin
- Origin: Japanese
- Meaning: It can have many different meanings depending on the kanji used.
- Region of origin: Japanese

Other names
- Related names: Shin; Shin'ichi; Shingo

Shinji (しんじ, シンジ) is a masculine Japanese given name. Notable people with the name include:

- Shinji Ando (安藤 真児; born 1970), Japanese former professional baseball player
- Shinji Aoba (青葉 真司; born 1978), perpetrator of the 2019 Kyoto Animation arson attack
- Shinji Aoto (青戸 慎司; born 1960), Japanese bobsledder
- Shinji Aoyama (青山 真治; 1964–2022), Japanese film director
- Shinji Aramaki (荒牧 伸志; born 1960), Japanese anime director and mechanical designer
- Shinji Doigawa (土井川 真二; born 1979), Japanese bobsledder
- Shinji Eshima (born 1956), Japanese-American musician, composer and teacher
- Shinji Fujiyoshi (藤吉 信次; born 1970), Japanese football manager and former player
- Shinji Fukuda (福田 真嗣; born 1977), Japanese Professor
- Shinji Hamazaki (浜崎 真二; 1901–1981), Japanese baseball player and manager
- Shinji Harada (原田 真二; born 1958), Japanese pop music artist
- Shinji Hashimoto (橋本 真司; born 1958), Japanese former game producer
- Shinji Hazawa (羽澤 慎治; born 1999), Japanese tennis player
- Shinji Higuchi (樋口 真嗣; born 1965), Japanese filmmaker
- Shinji Hirai (平井 伸治; born 1961), Japanese politician
- Shinji Hiramatsu (平松 伸二; born 1955), Japanese manga artist
- Shinji Hosoe (細江 慎治; born 1967), Japanese video game composer and musician
- Shinji Hosokawa (細川伸二; born 1960), Japanese retired judoka
- Shinji Imanaka (今中 慎二; born 1971), Japanese former Nippon Professional Baseball pitcher
- Shinji Imaoka (今岡 信治; born 1965), Japanese film director, screenwriter and actor
- Shinji Inoue (井上 信治; born 1969), Japanese politician
- Shinji Inoue (baseball) (井上 真二; born 1966), Japanese former Nippon Professional Baseball outfielder
- Shinji Ishihira (石平 信司), Japanese anime director
- Shinji Ishimaru (石丸 伸二; born 1982), Japanese politician
- Shinji Ito (伊東 慎治; born 1963), Japanese former swimmer
- Shinji Iwata (岩田 慎司; born 1987), Japanese professional right-handed pitcher
- Shinji Jojo (城定 信次; born 1977), Japanese former football player
- Shinji Kagawa (香川 真司; born 1989), Japanese professional footballer
- Shinji Kajio (梶尾 真治; born 1947), Japanese author of science fiction and fantasy
- Shinji Kanki, Japanese composer
- Shinji Kawada (川田 紳司; born 1971), Japanese voice actor
- Shinji Kawasaki (川崎 真治; 1921-2007), Japanese archaeologist
- Shinji Kawashima (川嶋 伸次; born 1966), Japanese long-distance runner
- Shinji Kazama (風間 深志; born 1950), Japanese motorcyclist
- Shinji Kobayashi (小林 伸二; born 1960), Japanese footballer and manager
- Shinji Koh (高 信二; born 1967), Japanese former professional baseball player
- Shinji Komiyama (小宮山 慎二; born 1985), Japanese former professional baseball catcher
- Shinji Kurano (倉野 信次; born 1974), Japanese former professional baseball pitcher
- Shinji Maejima (前嶋 信次; 1903–1983), Japanese orientalist
- Shinji Maggy (マギー 審司; born 1973), Japanese comedian and magician
- Shinji Maki (牧 伸二; 1934-2013), Japanese mandan comedian
- Shinji Makino (牧野 真二; born 1976), Japanese former football player
- Shinji Matsuo (松尾 慎治; born 1983), Japanese businessman and marketer
- Shinji Matsuura (松浦 進二; born 1964), Japanese retired male badminton player
- Shinji Mikami (三上 真司; born 1965), Japanese video game designer, director and producer
- Shinji Miura (三浦 伸二; born 1975), Japanese bobsledder
- Shinji Miyadai (宮台 真司; born 1959), Japanese sociologist and professor
- Shinji Miyazaki (宮崎 慎二; born 1956), Japanese composer and arranger
- Shinji Mizui (伸次), a Japanese musician
- Shinji Mizushima (水島 新司; 1939–2022), Japanese manga artist
- Shinji Mori (森 慎二; 1974–2017), Japanese professional baseball right-handed pitcher
- Shinji Morimoto (森本 真治; born 1973), Japanese politician
- Shinji Morisue (森末 慎二; born 1957), Japanese gymnast and Olympic champion
- Shinji Murai (村井 慎二; born 1979), Japanese former football player
- Shinji Nagashima (永島 慎二; 1937–2005), Japanese manga artist
- Shinji Nagatomo (長友 慎治; born 1977), Japanese politician
- Shinji Nakae (中江 真司; 1935—2007), Japanese actor, voice actor and narrator
- Shinji Nakamoto (中本 新二; born 1945), Japanese archer
- Shinji Nakano (中野 信治; born 1971), Japanese professional racing driver
- Shinji Nakano (cyclist) (中野 慎詞; born 1999), Japanese track cyclist
- Shinji Niinuma (新沼 慎二; born 1979), Japanese former Nippon Professional Baseball catcher
- Shinji Nojima (野島 伸司; born 1963), Japanese screenwriter
- Shinji Ogawa (小川 真司; 1941–2015), Japanese actor, voice actor and narrator
- Shinji Oguma (小熊 慎司; born 1968), Japanese politician
- Shinji Ogura (小倉 新司; born 1944), Japanese long jumper
- Shinji Ohara (大原 慎司; born 1985), Japanese professional baseball player
- Shinji Okada (岡田 慎司; born 1996), Japanese footballer
- Shinji Okazaki (岡崎 慎司; born 1986), Japanese former professional footballer
- Shinji Okuda (奥田 新治; born 1959), Japanese former handball player
- Shinji Ono (小野 伸二; born 1979), Japanese former professional footballer
- Shinji Onuki (大貫 慎二; born 1962), Japanese former rugby union player
- Shinji Orito (折戸 伸治; born 1973), Japanese musical composer
- Shinji Otsu (大津 真二; born 1961), Japanese sailor
- Shinji Otsuka (大塚 真司; born 1975), Japanese professional football manager and former player
- Shinji Saito (斎藤 慎司; born 1989), Japanese yo-yo competitor and performer
- Shinji Sarusawa (猿澤 真治; born 1969), Japanese football player and manager
- Shinji Sasaoka (佐々岡 真司; born 1967), Japanese former Nippon Professional Baseball pitcher and manager
- Shinji Satō (佐藤 信二; 1932–2016), Japanese politician
- Shinji Shimoyama (下山 真二; born 1975), Japanese baseball player
- Shinji Sogō (十河 信二; 1884–1981), creator of the Shinkansen high-speed rail system
- Shinji Sōmai (相米 慎二; 1948–2001), Japanese film director
- Shinji Tajima (田島 慎二; born 1989), Japanese former professional baseball pitcher
- Shinji Shimoyama (下山 真二; born 1975), Japanese baseball player
- Shinji Takahashi (disambiguation), multiple people
  - Shinji Takahashi (baseball) (高橋 信二; born 1978), Japanese baseball player
  - Shinji Takahashi (religious leader) (高橋 信次; 1927–1976), Japanese religious leader
  - Shinji Takahashi (sport shooter) (高橋 信司; born 1937), Japanese sport shooter
  - Shinji Takahashi (volleyball) (髙橋 慎治; born 1980), Japanese volleyball player
- Shinji Takahira (高平 慎士; born 1984), Japanese sprinter
- Shinji Takamatsu (高松 信司; born 1961), Japanese storyboard artist, screenwriter and director
- Shinji Takao (高尾 紳路; born 1976), Japanese professional Go player
- Shinji Takeda (武田 真治; born 1972), Japanese actor, talent and saxophone player
- Shinji Takehara (竹原 慎二; born 1972), Japanese former professional boxer
- Shinji Takeuchi (竹内 進二; born 1964), Japanese politician
- Shinji Tanaka (田中 真二; born 1960), Japanese former football player and manager
- Shinji Tanimura (谷村 新司; 1948–2023), Japanese singer-songwriter
- Shinji Tarutoko (樽床 伸二; born 1959), Japanese politician
- Shinji Tatsuta (龍田 峻次; 1914–1991), Japanese ski jumper
- Shinji Tominari (冨成 慎司; born 1987), Japanese footballer
- Shinji Tomiyama (冨山 晋司; born 1981), Japanese coach
- Shinji Tsujio (辻尾 真二; born 1985), Japanese football player
- Shinji Turner-Yamamoto, Japanese environmental artist
- Shinji Udaka (宇高 伸次; born 1976), Japanese baseball player
- Shinji Wada (和田 慎二; 1950–2011), Japanese manga artist
- Shinji Yamada (樽床 伸二; born 1994), Japanese professional footballer
- Shinji Yamamoto (山本 伸二; born 1953), Japanese former handball player
- Shinji Yamasaki (山崎 慎次; born 1962), Japanese water polo player
- Shinji Yamashita (山下 真司; born 1951), Japanese actor
- Shinji Yoshida (吉田 真次; born 1984), Japanese politician
- Shinji Yoshino (吉野 信次; 1888–1971), Japanese bureaucrat, politician and cabinet minister

== Fictional characters ==
- Shinji, from Kids Return
- Shinji, from Texhnolyze
- Shinji, an antagonist of the manga Digimon Chronicle, partnered with Omnimon X
- Shinji, the Japanese name of Paul from Pokémon
- Shinji Hirako, from Bleach
- Shinji Ibu, a regular for the Fudomine Middle School tennis team in the series The Prince of Tennis
- Shinji Ikari, from Neon Genesis Evangelion
- Shinji Inui, from Initial D
- Shinji Itou, a supporting character in the visual novel and anime Chaos;Child
- Shinji Kamuro, from Mob Psycho 100
- Shinji Kasai, the Ultimate Firefighter, from the fangame “Danganronpa: Another 2”, based on the Danganronpa series
- Shinji Kazama, from Talentless Nana
- Shinji Kido, the title hero from Kamen Rider Ryuki
- Shinji Koganei, from Kuroko's Basketball
- Shinji Kubo, the protagonist of the Yukio Mishima novel The Sound of Waves
- Shinji Matou, from Fate/stay night
- Shinji Mimura, from Battle Royale
- Shinji Nakagawa, from Megazone 23
- Shinji Nishiya/Kamui Woods, from My Hero Academia
- Shinji Tanaka, from Yakuza
- Shinji Watari, from Haikyuu!!
- Shinji Webber, from Yu-Gi-Oh! Arc-V
- Shinji Yoshimatsu, from Lycoris Recoil
