= Shin'ichi =

- Pronunciation: shin-ichi
- Gender: Male

Origin
- Origin: Japanese
- Meaning: It can have many different meanings depending on the kanji used
- Region of origin: Japanese

Other names
- Related names: Shin; Shinji; Ken'ichi; Jun'ichi

Shin'ichi or Shinichi (しんいち, シンイチ) is a masculine Japanese given name. Shin and ichi are separated and it is pronounced [ɕiɰ̃itɕi].

== Written forms ==
Different kanji that are pronounced "shin" (しん) are combined with the kanji for "one" (一, ichi; いち)" to give different names:

- 真一, "true, one"
- 信一, "belief, one"
- 伸一, "extend, one"
- 進一, "progress, one"
- 新一, "new, one"
- 慎一, "humility, one"
- 晋一, "advance, one"
- 紳一, "gentleman, one"
- 鎮一, "tranquilize, one"
- 愼一, "care, one"

== People with the name ==
- Shinichi Aoki (紳一, born 1965), Japanese professional Go player
- Shinichi Chiba (真一), also known as Sonny Chiba, a Japanese actor
- Shinichi Fujimura (新一, born 1950), Japanese amateur archaeologist
- Shin'ichi Hisamatsu (久松 真一; 1889–1980), Japanese Zen Buddhist scholar, philosopher and tea master
- Shinichi Honma (本間 信一; born 1934), Japanese ice hockey player
- Shinichi Hoshi (新一, 1926–1997), Japanese novelist and science fiction writer
- Shinichi Ikejiri (池尻 愼一; 1909–1945), Japanese physician and writer
- Shin'ichi Ishiwata (信一), Japanese scientist
- Shinichi Itoh (真一, born 1966), Japanese professional Grand Prix motorcycle road racer
- Shinichi Iwasaki (岩崎 伸一; born 1968), Japanese ice hockey player
- Shin'ichi Kasai ((笠井 信一; 1864-1929), Japanese bureaucrat
- Shinichi Kitaoka (伸一, born 1948), Japanese professor of political science
- Shinichi Mori (進一, born 1947), Japanese enka singer
- Shinichi Osawa (大沢 伸, born 1967), Japanese musician
- Shinichi Ota (太田 真一; born 1975), Japanese cyclist
- Shin'ichi Sagami (佐上 信一, 1882-1943), Japanese bureaucrat
- Shinichi Sato (baseball) (佐藤 真一; born 1965), Japanese baseball player
- Shinichi Sato (footballer) (佐藤 真一; born 1975), Japanese footballer
- Shin'ichi Satō (shogi) (佐藤 慎一; born 1982), Japanese shogi player
- Shinichi Sekizawa (新一, 1921–1992), Japanese screenwriter
- Shinichi Shinohara (信一, born 1973), Japanese judoka
- Shinichi Suzuki (violinist) (鎮一, 1898–1998), Japanese violinist
- Suzuki Shin'ichi I (真一, 1835–1918), Japanese photographer
- Suzuki Shin'ichi II (真一, 1855–1912), Japanese photographer
- Shinichi Tanaka (ski jumper) (田中 信一; born 1959), Japanese ski jumper
- Shin'ichi Tanaka (photographer) (田中 新一), Japanese photographer
- Shinichi Tomii (富井 慎一; born 1980), Japanese modern pentathlete
- Shinichi Tsutsumi (真一, born 1964), Japanese stage and screen actor
- Shinichi Watanabe (慎一, born 1964), Japanese anime director
- Wakakirin Shinichi (真一, born 1983), Japanese sumo wrestler
- Shinichi Osawa (伸一, born 1967), Japanese pop artist
- Shinichi Ishihara (born 1960), anison singer and anime voice actor
- Shinichi Morishita (born 1960), Japanese football player

== Fictional characters ==
- Shinichi Kudō (新一) in the US Version named Jimmy Kudo, the main protagonist of the anime and manga series Case Closed (Detective Conan)
- Shin'ichi Akiyama, the male protagonist of the manga Liar game
- Shin'ichi Chiaki, the male protagonist of the manga Nodame Cantabile
- Shinichi Izumi, the protagonist of the anime and manga series Parasyte
- Shinichi, kitsune antagonist in the trilogy of books The Vampire Diaries: The Return
- Shinichi Namura is a character in Marmalade Boy. He is Meiko's teacher and secret lover in the manga and anime series.
- Shinichi Sakurai, the male protagonist of Uzaki-chan Wants to Hang Out!
- Shin'ichi Susuki, the protagonist of YOU and ME and HER: A Love Story
- Shinichi, the son of a chauffeur who’s kidnapped for a ransom in the 1963 Akira Kurosawa crime drama High and Low
