= Shimoyama =

Shimoyama may refer to:

- Shimoyama (surname)
- Shimoyama, Aichi, a former village in Aichi Prefecture, Japan
- Shimoyama Station (disambiguation), multiple railway stations in Japan
- 2908 Shimoyama, a main-belt asteroid
