= Shinichi Tanaka =

Shinichi Tanaka may refer to:

- Shinichi Tanaka (ski jumper)
- Shin'ichi Tanaka (photographer)
