= Heinrich Heidersberger =

German photographer (1906–2006)

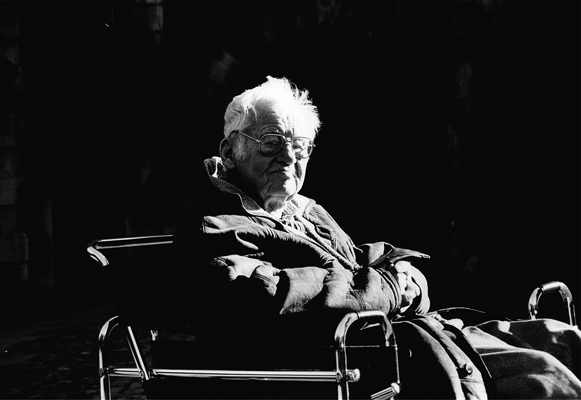
Heinrich Heidersberger

Heinrich Heidersberger (10 June 1906, in Ingolstadt – 14 July 2006) was a German photographer noted for his work on architectural subjects.

Heidersberger attended the now defunct Académie Moderne, formerly at 86 rue Notre-Dame des Champs in Montparnasse. There he studied painting under Fernand Léger. His surrealist work was inspired at least in part by Man Ray. He worked for Stern magazine in the 1940s, wherein he published a controversial series of erotic photographs involving projected light and shadows on nude women.

An institute for presenting the heritage of Heinrich Heidersberger was set up by his son Benjamin in 2002. Among other projects he organized an exhibition in Cuba with works about the country from the 1950s, in cooperation with the Cuban Culture Ministry.
