= Komiyama =

Komiyama (written: 小宮山 or 込山) is a Japanese surname. Notable people with the surname include:

- Haruka Komiyama (込山榛香) (born 1998), Japanese idol
- Hiroshi Komiyama (小宮山 宏) (born 1944), Japanese scientist
- Satoru Komiyama (小宮山 悟) (born 1965), Japanese baseball player
- Shinji Komiyama (小宮山 慎二) (born 1985), Japanese baseball player
- Takanobu Komiyama (小宮山 尊信) (born 1984), Japanese footballer
- Yasuko Komiyama (小宮山 泰子) (born 1965), Japanese politician
- Yoko Komiyama (小宮山 洋子) (born 1948), Japanese politician

== See also ==
- 6405 Komiyama, main-belt asteroid
