= Ishiwata =

Ishiwata (written: 石渡 or 石綿) is a Japanese surname. Notable people with the surname include:

- Kiyoharu Ishiwata (石渡 清元, 1940–2014), Japanese politician
- Osamu Ishiwata (石渡 治, born 1959), Japanese manga artist
- Shin'ichi Ishiwata (石渡 信一), Japanese scientist
