= Chisato Nishikigi =

Fictional character from Lycoris Recoil

- Lycoris Recoil character
- Official character design, created by Imigimuru
- First appearance: "Episode 1: Easy does it"; Lycoris Recoil; 2022
- Last appearance: "Episode 13: Recoil of Lycoris"; Lycoris Recoil; 2022
- Created by: Spider Lily; Asaura
- Portrayed by: Misato Kawauchi
- Voiced by: Japanese (Japan) Chika Anzai; English (United States) Lizzie Freeman; French (France) Sofia Aboubatmane; Spanish (Mexico) Diana Castañeda; Portuguese (Brazil) Matara Stefane; German (Germany) Amira Leisner
- Age: 17-18
- Height: 162 cm
- Birthday: September 23

In-universe information
- Occupation: Lycoris Agent; Waitress
- Affiliation: Café LycoReco; Direct Attack
- Fighting style: Quickly predicting and reacting to the opponent's moves (usually by dodging attacks)
- Weapon: Modified Detonics Combat Master; Various types of heavy-duty guns
- Family: Mika, Shinji Yoshimatsu (Adoptive fathers)
- Nationality: Japanese

Chisato Nishikigi (Japanese: 錦木 千束, Hepburn: Nishikigi Chisato) is one of the two main characters of the Japanese anime television series Lycoris Recoil, created by Spider Lily and Asaura. She is depicted in the series as the most skilled agent among the Lycoris, a group of trained young female agents working for the secretive organization Direct Attack and are assigned to maintain the peace and stability of Japan.

Chisato has abnormal reflexes, being able to dodge bullets even at point-blank range. She reads the micro-expressions, muscle twitches, and intent of the shooter. She knows when they are going to pull the trigger before they even do it. She can track the shifting weight of an opponent or notice hidden traps before they spring. She memorizes every gun model's fire rate, muzzle velocity, and ballistic limitations on the fly, instantly calculating trajectories and angles in a fraction of a second to ensure she is standing in safety. However, she is a pacifist, working as a waitress at LycoReco, a café affiliated with Direct Attack, and choosing to use rubber bullets that can only temporarily knock enemies unconscious, putting her often at odds with the secretive and lethal nature of Direct Attack's operations. At the beginning of the series, she was assigned to be the partner of Takina Inoue, an agent who was transferred to LycoReco for disrespecting orders, teaching the latter the approaches of pacifism and getting her to enjoy living a life outside of being an agent.

Chisato was originally meant to be more serious; however, this was changed to her being a cheerful and optimistic character to make her likable to the audience. Her ability to dodge bullets was created as director Shingo Adachi felt that only making her be able to use a gun would be too difficult. She is voiced by Chika Anzai in Japanese and Lizzie Freeman in English. She is portrayed by Misato Kawauchi in the stage play. Critical reception for Chisato has been positive, with praise owing to her characterization, Anzai's performance of her and her chemistry with Takina.

== Conception and creation ==
During the series' pre-production, Chisato's character profile was a topmost priority by the staff. In an interview, series director Shingo Adachi noted that he wrote Chisato's character as if she is writing her own. Adachi also felt that Chisato should be more human to make her likable to the audience and express more owing to her status as a main character. Adachi describes Chisato as an 'intelligent, yet normal kid, not having answers to anything but following what is right in her heart, believing that her words is what drives the story forward'. He also wanted her to speak after a moment of thinking, finding unnecessary dialogue and pauses to be significant and shows authenticity. Chisato was intended in the earlier drafts to be a serious character who would later softened as her friendship with Takina progress. When Adachi later joined the project, he presented his idea of happiness and type of woman to Asaura, who became interested in his idea, causing major revisions to Chisato's personality. Asaura admitted in an interview that due to this change, she became difficult to write and her personality can be best expressed using the anime medium. He further noted that the changes made Chisato the perfect fit to Takina's 'aloof persona', stating that if they were the same as it once was, they would both be busy people. Chisato was also originally written as being dissatisfied with having Takina as her partner. This was changed as Asaura did not like the idea as the first episode would be too tense for his taste. Furthermore, he also expressed difficulty in presenting a story featuring children firing guns in a positive light; as a result, they reframed the story to focus more into the development of friendship between the two main characters.

In her initial design, her hair was originally white with a bluish shadow, but character designer Imigimuru thought she looked like a royalty, opting for a yellowish shadow instead. He also wanted to give her a distinct look, thus her hair gained curls and ribbons. Imigimuru also stated that he wanted to have the hairstyles of the two main characters to be symmetrical; thus, he contrasted Takina's hair design with a long black hair with no accessories. Originally, Chisato was meant to be skilled only with guns. However, the idea was rejected as Adachi thought that the series would be like a 'John Wick film', opting to give her the superhuman ability to dodge bullets.

=== Voice casting ===
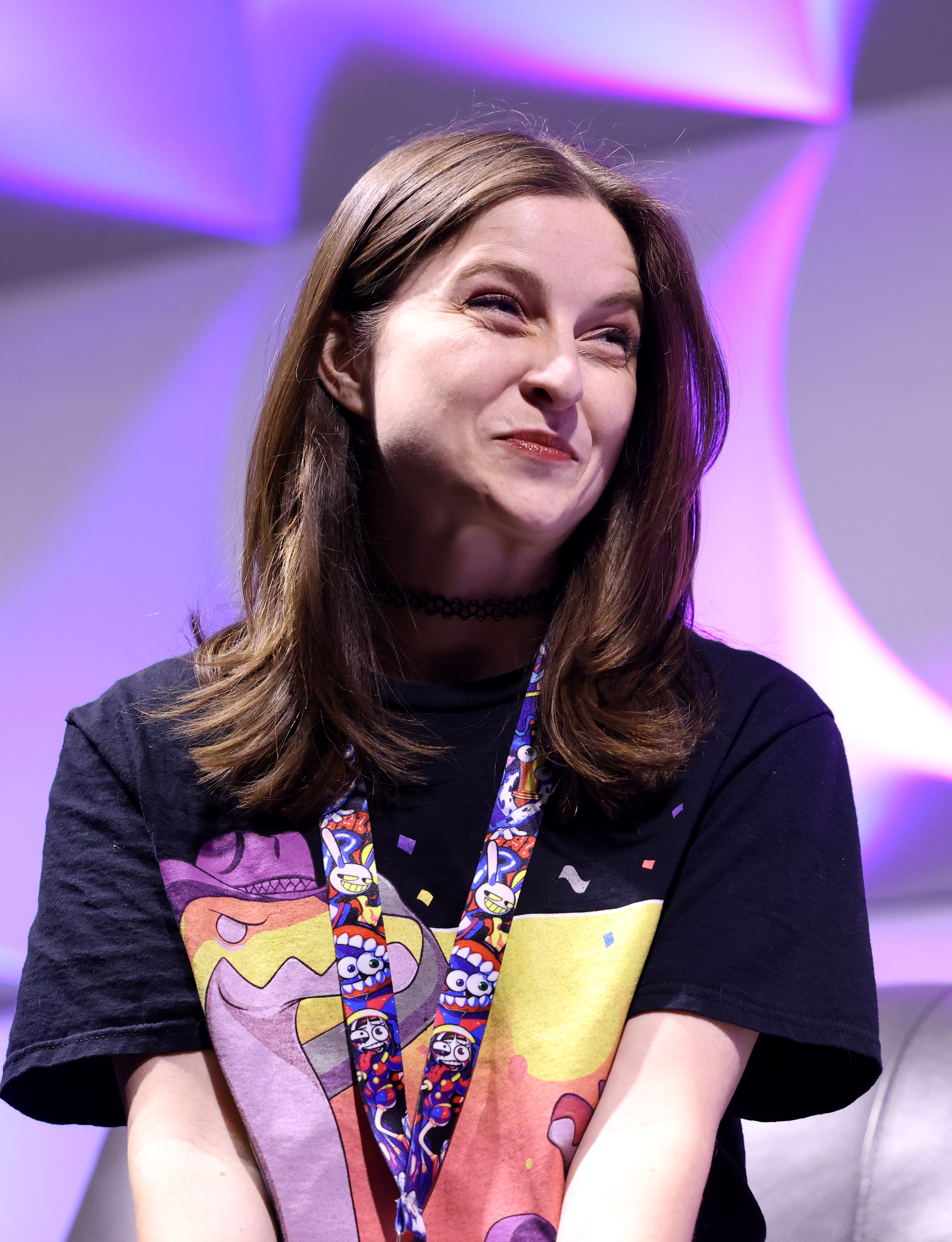
Lizzie Freeman voices Chisato Nishikigi in the English dub of Lycoris Recoil original anime.

Chisato is voiced by Chika Anzai in Japanese and Lizzie Freeman in English. Anzai was surprised by the depth of the script that she enjoyed reading it. She mentioned that the roles for auditioning were from Chisato and Takina, and expressed concerns that she would not be able to do it after noting the script's depth. She submitted her audition, expecting that she would not be chosen for a role. She also noted that she originally thought that she would voice Takina instead of Chisato if her audition was accepted. Describing her role as Chisato, Anzai noted that during recording, she felt Chisato speaking to her during her scenes with Takina that she ended up forgetting she was acting. According to her, Chisato's charm comes from her capacity to understand the feelings of others and, despite having her own goals, she does not enforce it on others.

== Media depiction ==
Chisato was recognized as the most skilled among the Lycoris at a very young age, almost singlehandedly defeating the terrorist Majima during the Radio Tower Incident. When she was a child, she would kill with no mercy. This changed after she was given an artificial heart by Yoshimatsu, giving her a pacifist perspective in life. During the first episode of the series, Chisato was called by Direct Attack to assist with their operation regarding a suspicious deal by suspected terrorists, unaware that an agent named Takina was also assigned in the same mission. She later learned that Direct Attack discharged Takina for disrespecting official orders during the mission, transferring her to LycoReco, a café affiliated with the organization where Chisato also works as a waitress. The two would then go together in a mission to protect the hacker named "Walnut" from danger. The two initially thought that Walnut was the person inside a squirrel costume bringing a suitcase, with them being shocked as they witnessed him being gunned to death. They soon learned that Walnut was in the suitcase and is a pseudonym of a girl that goes by the name Kurumi, who would join the café as a waitress afterwards in exchange of protection. While going to the headquarters of Direct Attack, Takina tags along in hopes of being reinstated. However, she would find out that she is replaced by Sakura Otome as the partner of Fuki Harukawa, her former partner. She and Chisato would team up and fight Furukawa and Otome in a mock battle. With Takina clearly upset of being replaced, Chisato consoles her, noting that she has a place in the café. One night, while the Lycoris were forced to stay indoors, she was targeted by the terrorist Majima, but narrowly escapes.

Chisato goes undercover to the club where LycoReco's owner Mika went to after accidentally checking out his phone and unexpectedly meets Yoshimatsu once more. After a confrontation with Majima, she went to her routine health check-up at Direct Attack, where she was sedated by Yoshimatsu's assistant to damage her artificial heart, forcing her to die after two months. During a terrorist attack orchestrated by Majima and his group, Chisato, along with Takina, are called by Direct Attack to assist with the incident. As the café closes, Mika reveals to Chisato that she was originally meant to be used as a weapon. However, differences erupted between him and Yoshimatsu regarding Chisato's future after the Radio Tower incident. Despite learning this, Chisato told Mika that she still choose to love them. She would later learn that Majima has held Yoshimatsu hostage at the same tower that she blew up years ago. She would later confronts Yoshimatsu, who orders her to kill him since her new artificial hear is inside him, which she refuses. As Yoshimatsu escapes, Chisato and Takina arrive at Enkoboku to save the trapped Lycoris from being murdered by the organization after their identities are revealed to the public by Majima. As they evacuate the Lycoris agents, Majima shows up and challenges Chisato to a one-on-one fight, which she accepts. She would ultimately prevail as Majima was shown to fall to the ground as she herself was rescued by Takina and others. Her whereabouts were kept unknown to Takina, who resolves to find Chisato using any means, finding her through an unassuming photo purportedly showing Chisato at the background. Afterwards, Chisato and the rest of her co-workers are shown to have traveled to Hawaii, operating a food truck version of LycoReco.

== Cultural impact ==
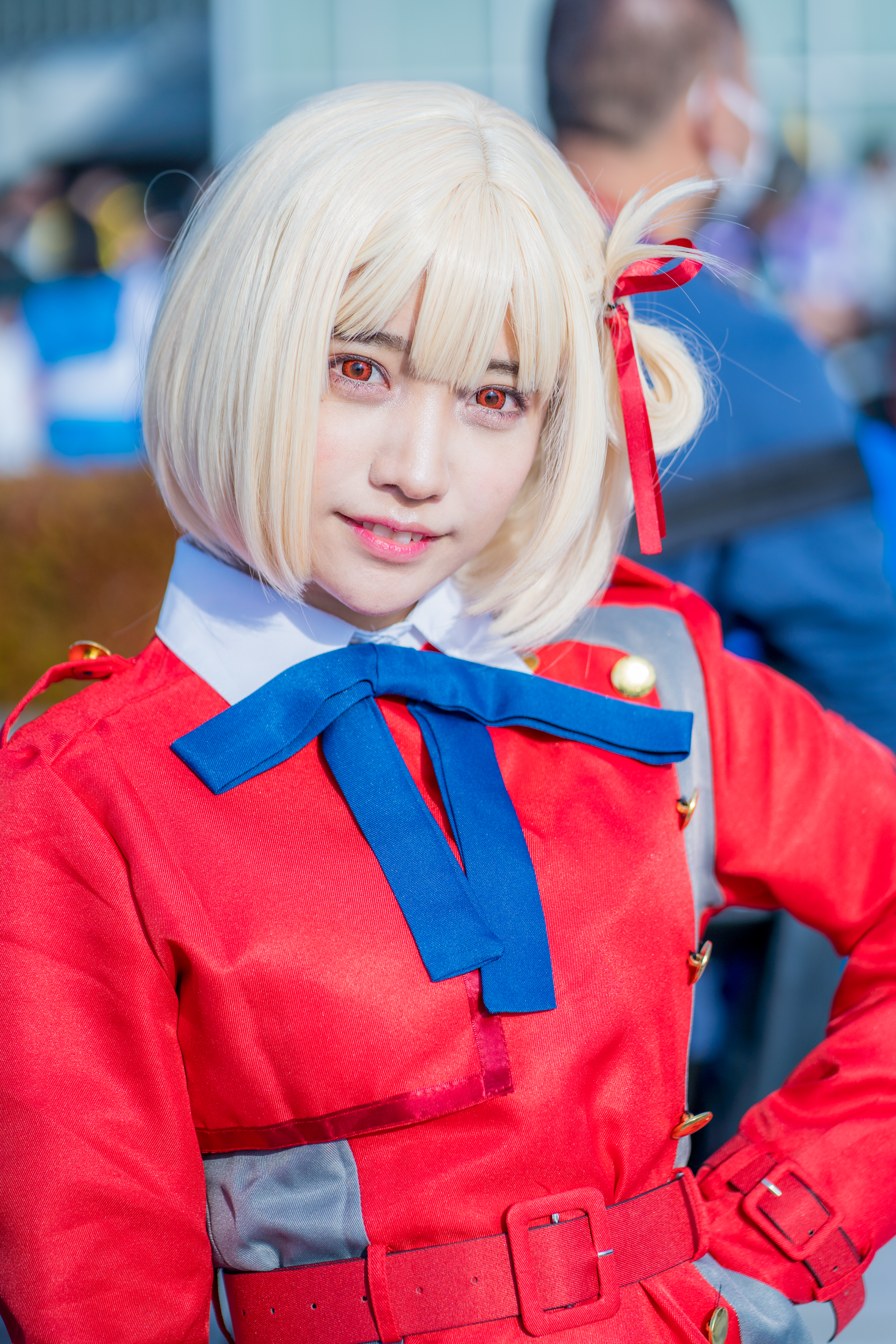
Cosplay of Chisato at Comiket 101

=== Critical reception ===
Stormie McNeal of Screen Rant commends Chisato's pacifist and jubilant personality yet having the capacity to adapt in the dangerous situations she is in, describing it as unique. Charles Hartford of But Why Tho? gave a positive reception to Chisato due to representing the character archetype of competitive characters who dream of living normally. Christopher Farris of the Anime News Network admires Chisato's call-out towards Direct Attack during the series' third episode, noting that it gives more depth to her character. Farris also reviewed the fifth episode, which he gave a positive reception as well, noting that it provides a narrative of how the client's desire to be killed is contrasted against Chisato's philosophy and despite learning the truth, her willingness to save her client shows that despite how ignorant it may seems, it is "illustrated as a unilateral good that allows our heroes to come out the correct side of the whole manipulated messy situation." David King of Bubbleblabber applauds the series depiction of Chisato's pacifist philosophy from the usual methods by other Lycoris. Both he and Hartford also commend the exploration of how Chisato ends up developing her beliefs. Eric Himmelheber of Anime Corner commends the revelation regarding Chisato's artificial heart, and despite not having a real one, her ability to understand people shows her complexity as a character. Anime Ignite considers Chisato as the highlight of the anime, noting that despite her stereotypical cheerfulness, she is much more perceptive than she shows, further praising the narrative revolving around her backstory gives her development, causing them to write Chisato as "one of the most well-written female protagonists" they have seen, as well as Chika Anzai's performance, noting that it is a part of Chisato's charm.

Harry Nugraha of Game Rant praises the bait-and-switch dynamic of Chisato and Takina's hot-blooded and cold-headed relationship, commenting that while the dynamic tends to have the former be reckless and the latter be calm and calculating, the anime switches the favor with Chisato having to reign in over Takina's more violent ways, stating that it creates "a great blend of familiarity and novelty at the same time. And it also brings something surprising and refreshing to the audience that is already so used to seeing this type of pairing in their favorite anime." Christopher Farris of the Anime News Network admires the chemistry both Chisato and Takina have with their personalities and approaches to their job showcasing how the duo showing their differences. Nick Weaver of Collider considers the forming bond of Chisato and Takina to be the main appeal due to how they both learn from one another and the unlikeliness of their friendship. In a review of the sixth episode, Eric Himmelheber of the Anime Corner finds the potential dynamic of Chisato and Majima to be interesting due to their differing methods and how Majima is intrigued by Chisato, who is on the same level as him. Himmelheber also commends the father-daughter relationship between Mika and Chisato during the series' tenth episode, as the emotion coupled with the shot, art, and voice acting made it an unforgettable, beautiful scene.

=== Popularity and legacy ===
Chisato was nominated for Best Main Character at the 7th Crunchyroll Anime Awards, along with her voice actresses Chika Anzai for Best Voice Artist Performance (Japanese) and Diana Castañeda for Best Voice Artist Performance (Spanish). Merchandising based on Chisato has also been released, including a Nendoroid figure, a 1/7 scale figure, and watches. Hideo Kojima has become a prominent fan of Lycoris Recoil, and has made multiple tweets expressing his admiration for the show and its characters, including a picture of one of his mannequins recreating a popular pose made by Chisato during the fourth episode, attracting the attention of Asaura and Imigimuru. He has also toured New York with filmmaker Nicolas Winding Refn while wearing matching Chisato and Takina T-shirts. Sumida Aquarium commemorates Chisato for imitating spotted eels in their Twitter account on November 11, which is "Spotted Eel Day".
