= Shimoyama (surname) =

Shimoyama (written: 下山) is a Japanese surname. Notable people with the surname include:

- Daichi Shimoyama (下山 大地, born 1989), Japanese basketball player
- Hifumi Shimoyama (下山 一二三, 1930–2023), Japanese classical composer
- Kenro Shimoyama (下山 研郎, born 1982), Japanese freestyle skier
- Shinji Shimoyama (下山 真二, born 1975), Japanese baseball player
- Takahiro Shimoyama (下山 貴裕, born 1992), Japanese basketball player
- Yoshimitsu Shimoyama (下山 吉光, born 1976), Japanese voice actor
