= Shinzō =

- Gender: Male
- Language: Japanese

Origin
- Origin: Japanese
- Meaning: Different meanings depending on the kanji used

Other names
- Nickname: Shin
- Related names: Shin

Shinzō, Shinzo or Shinzou is a masculine Japanese given name.

== Written forms ==
Shinzō can be written using different kanji characters and can mean:

- 真三, "true, three"
- 伸三, "extend, three"
- 新三, "new, three"
- 心臓, "heart"
- 信三, "belief, three"
- 進三, "progress, three"
- 慎三, "humility, three"
- 晋三, "advance, three"
- 紳三, "gentleman, three"
- 新蔵, "new, warehouse"

The name can also be written in hiragana or katakana.

== People with the given name ==
Notable people with the name include:

- Shinzō Abe (安倍 晋三; 1954–2022), Japanese politician and former Prime Minister of Japan
- Shinzō Fukuhara (福原 信三; 1883–1948), Japanese photographer
- Shinzō Hanabusa (英 伸三; born 1936), Japanese photographer
- Shinzo Koroki (興梠 慎三; born 1986), Japanese footballer
- Shinzo Maeda (前田 真三; 1922–1998), Japanese photographer
- Shinzō Shimao (島尾 伸三; born 1948), Japanese photographer
- Shinzo Shinjo (新城 新蔵; 1873–1938), Japanese academic, physicist, astronomer
- Shinzo Yamada (山田 伸三; 1914–2000), Japanese cross-country skier

== See also ==
- Shinzo or Mushrambo, Japanese anime series
