= Benjamin Heidersberger =

Benjamin Heidersberger (born in 1957 in Braunschweig, Germany) is a German media artist, journalist, entrepreneur and culture manager. He lives and works in Berlin and Wolfsburg.

== Early life ==
Heidersberger studied physics, biology, and computer science at the Technical University of Braunschweig in 1978. From 1978 to 1984, he was part of the interdisciplinary artist group Head Resonance Company in Wolfsburg. Along with vocalist and percussionist Peter Elsner, they conducted research on how ideas become reality in architecture, music, performance and installation.

== Career ==
In 1984, he moved to Hamburg to work for a PC-dealer. From 1988 onward, he was an editor of the Computer-Magazine, MACup, about hardware and software, and later about art, technology, and society.

In 1989, he co-founded the Ponton-Lab as an artist group and realised interactive media and TV-projects on Documenta- 8 and Documenta- IX, in Japan 1993 as well as on Ars Electronica 1986, 89, 90 and 96 under the brand Van Gogh TV.

In 1992, the international project Piazza virtuale was realised, transmitting during the 100 days of Documenta daily 90 minutes of live-TV from 12 studios across Europe. The same year he curated the exhibition "Creative Software – On Men and Milestones" at Ars Electronica.

In 1993 and 1994, Heidersberger taught Design of Electronic Media at Merz-Academy in Stuttgart. Ponton-Lab was formed into a full-service internet agency with up to 20 employees and realised the websites for the Lower Saxony State Government and for the Federal Press Office and later the Ministry of Foreign Affairs. 1998 he launched Kulturserver, an online community for art and culture consisting of online-services for 20.000 artists similar to social media. The project was invited to present at the international conference “Cultura y Desarrollo” in Havana.

In 2002, he founded the Heidersberger Institute in Wolfsburg Castle to archive and publish the work of his father, photographer Heinrich Heidersberger. The Institute collaborates with contemporary artists to contextualise that work. In the same year he was curator for netart on the 4th Werkleitz Binnale.

Beginning in 2011 Heidersberger gave lectures at the Department of Media Studies and Musicology in Humboldt-University. In 2012, he curated and produced the concert of the Japanese composer Shinji Kanki, for the Alvar Aalto Festival in Wolfsburg. He realized the algorithmic piano composition Pentatonic Permutations in a series of concerts and sound installations, among others at Ars Electronica 2016.

In 2017, he began curating the production-arts festival Drehmoment for the KulturRegion Stuttgart.

== Awards and nominations ==
- 1991 Smithsonian Award, Washington – Nominee
- 1993 Siemens International Media Art award, by ZKM Karlsruhe
- 1993 Prix Ars Electronica
- 1994 Interactive Media Festival, Los Angeles – Nominee
- 2000 Best of Business-to-Business Award, as CEO, category Multimedia
- 2002 eMIL- Award, category User Interface
- 2003 eMIL- Award, category Internet
- 2004 WebFish award of the Evangelical Church in Germany (EKD), category Innovation
- 2008 WebFish of the EKD, category Internet

== Bibliography ==
- Heinrich Heidersberger: Wolfsburg – Bilder einer jungen Stadt. Herausgeber, with Bernd Rodrian, ISBN 3-89479-826-2.
- Johannes Ehrhardt (Hg.): Netzwerk-Dimensionen. Kulturelle Konfigurationen und Managementperspektiven, Die virtuelle Piazza. 1992, ISBN 3-89238-045-7.
- Manfred Waffender (Hg.): Cyberspace : Ausflüge in virtuelle Wirklichkeiten, Die digitale Droge. 1993, ISBN 3-49918-185-1
- Christoph Ernst, Jens Schröter (Editors): (Re-)Imagining New Media. Techno-Imaginaries around 2000 and the case of "Piazza virtuale" (1992), ISBN 978-3-658--32898-6
