= Lizzie Freeman =

American voice actress (born 1992)

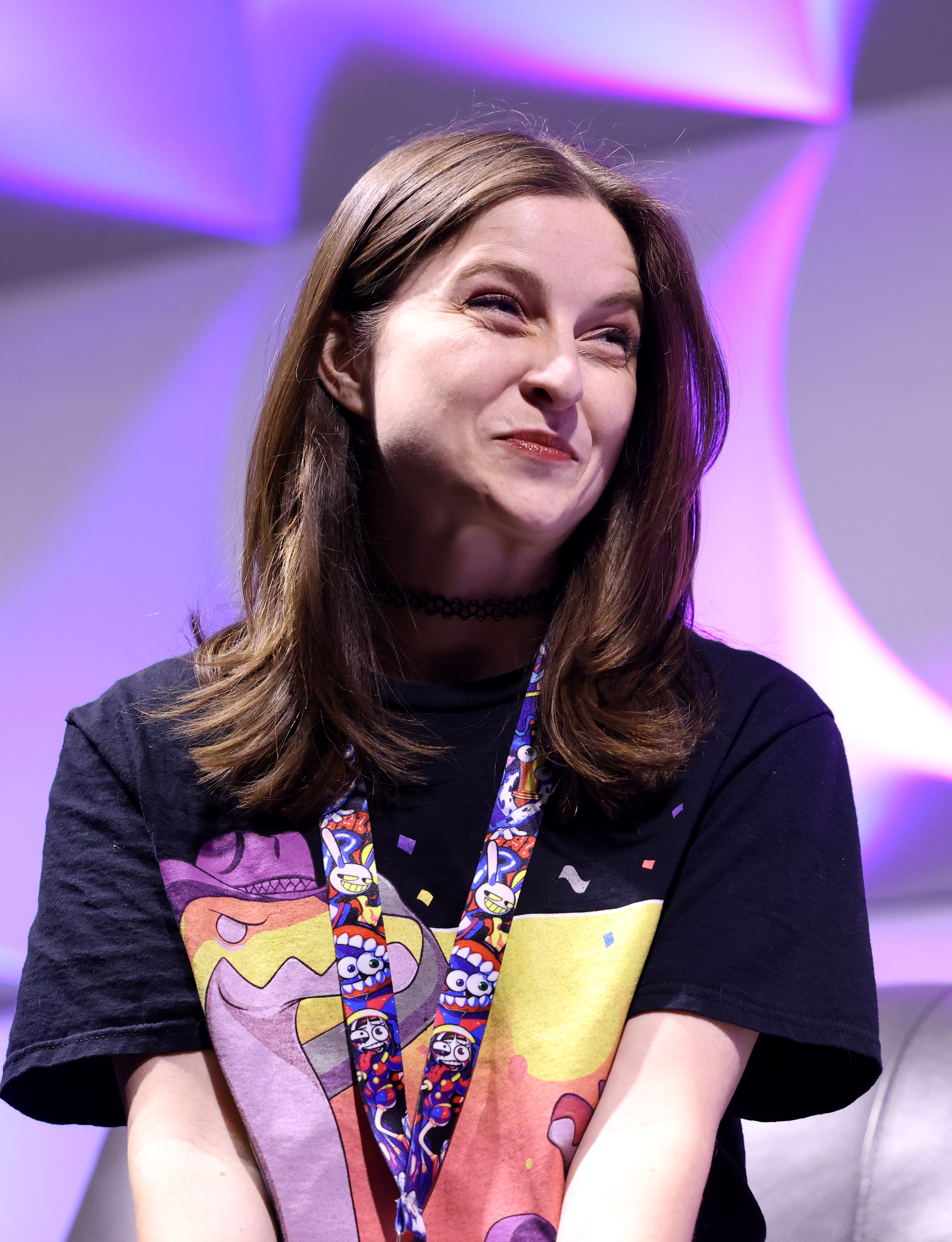
- Freeman in 2025
- Born: Elizabeth Freeman; November 2, 1992 (age 34); Oklahoma City, Oklahoma, U.S.
- Occupation: Voice actress
- Years active: 2012–present
- Website: lizziefreeman.com

Elizabeth Freeman (born November 2, 1992) is an American voice actress. She is known for providing the voice of Pomni in The Amazing Digital Circus, as well as the English voices of Trish Una in JoJo's Bizarre Adventure: Golden Wind, Coral in Pokemon Horizons: The Series, Sempai in Magical Sempai, Chizuru Mizuhara in Rent-A-Girlfriend, Chisato Nishikigi in Lycoris Recoil, and Teddy Bear in Inanimate Insanity. In addition, she was the original voice actress for the character Meggy Spletzer in SMG4 and its spin-off Sunset Paradise, from 2020 to 2022.

== Biography ==
Lizzie Freeman was born on November 2, 1992, in Oklahoma City, Oklahoma, United States. She was raised Mormon but currently identifies as agnostic. Freeman started attending plays in her middle school years. During her senior year of high school, Freeman became interested in voice acting. She did voice impressions and was involved in indie works until transferring in Los Angeles, landing her first role there with the remaster of Secret of Mana.

== Filmography ==
=== Animation ===
Year	Title	Role	Notes
2022–2023	Ejen Ali	Alicia Kheng	
2023	Mickey Mouse Funhouse	Gertie	

==== Film ====
Year	Title	Role	Notes
2025	In Your Dreams	Sandling	

==== Anime ====
Year	Title	Role	Notes
2019	Sword Art Online: Alicization	Cardinal	
2019	The Promised Neverland	Mujika	
2019	Lupin the 3rd: Goodbye Partner	Emika	
2019	Magical Sempai	Sempai	
2019	Isekai Cheat Magician	Rin Azuma	
2020	JoJo's Bizarre Adventure: Golden Wind	Trish Una	
2020	In/Spectre	Kotoko Iwanaga	
2020	Magia Record: Puella Magi Madoka Magica Side Story	Felicia Mitsuki	
2020	Ascendance of a Bookworm	Delia	
2020	Rent-A-Girlfriend	Chizuru Mizuhara	
2020	Monster Girl Doctor	Kunai Zenow	
2020	The Misfit of Demon King Academy	Ellen Mihais	
2020	Tonikawa: Over the Moon for You	Chitose Kaginoji	
2021	Adachi and Shimamura	Pancho	
2021	The Hidden Dungeon Only I Can Enter	Emma Brightness	
2021	Vivy: Fluorite Eye's Song	Momoka Kirishima	
2021	Tokyo Revengers	Hinata Tachibana	
2021	I've Been Killing Slimes for 300 Years and Maxed Out My Level	Falfa	
2021	The Seven Deadly Sins: Dragon's Judgement	Orlondi	
2021	Edens Zero	Labilia Christy	
2021	The Honor Student at Magic High School	Airi Isshiki	
2021	Dropout Idol Fruit Tart	Tone Honmachi	
2022	The Strongest Sage With the Weakest Crest	Alma	
2022	Cells at Work! Code Black	White Blood Cell (Neutrophil) 8787	
2022	Blue Reflection Ray	Yuzu	
2022	Lupin the 3rd Part 6	Finn Clark	
2022	Love Live! Superstar!!	Sumire Heanna	
2022	Rent-A-Girlfriend Season 2	Chizuru Mizuhara	
2022	Lycoris Recoil	Chisato Nishikigi	
2022	Fate/Grand Carnival	Ritsuka Fujimaru	
2022	PuraOre! Pride of Orange	Ayaka Mizusawa	
2022	Pokémon Ultimate Journeys: The Series	Lisia	
2022	Pokémon: Hisuian Snow	Alec	
2023	Tonikawa: Over the Moon for You Season 2	Chitose Kaginoji	
2023	Digimon Adventure	Patamon	
2023	In/Spectre 2	Kotoko Iwanaga	
2023	My Happy Marriage	Kaya Saimori	
2023	Rent-A-Girlfriend Season 3	Chizuru Mizuhara	
2023	Zom 100: Bucket List of the Dead	Kumiko	
2023	My Love Story with Yamada-kun at Lv999	Yukari Tsubaki	
2024	Maboroshi	Yūko Sonobe	
2024	Mobile Suit Gundam SEED Freedom	Aura Maha Khyber	
2024	Rascal Does Not Dream of a Sister Venturing Out	Tomoe Koga	
2024	Rascal Does Not Dream of a Knapsack Kid	Tomoe Koga	
2024	Pokémon Horizons: The Series	Coral	
2024	Mobile Suit Gundam: Silver Phantom	Babia Lena	
2024	Rascal Does Not Dream of Bunny Girl Senpai	Tomoe Koga	
2025	Medalist	Yuki Uyama	
2025	Sakamoto Days	Nao Toramaru	
2025	Tougen Anki	Hina Momota	
2026	Grow Up Show: Sunflower Circus	Mizuka Tsurumaki	
2026	The Ghost in the Shell	Fuchikoma	
2026	Though I Am an Inept Villainess	Leelee	

==== Web animation ====
Year	Title	Role	Notes
2018	Gods School	Sfiga, Aphrodite	
2020	BKNK	Susan	
2020	ENA: Auction Day	Ena and Moony	
2020	ENA: Extinction Party	Ena and Moony	
2020–22; 2025	SMG4	Meggy Spletzer	
2021	ENA: Temptation Stairway	Ena and Moony	
2021	Rhythm N' Ambush	Ula	
2021	Sunset Paradise	Meggy Spletzer	
2021–present	Spooky Month	Jaune, Happy Fellas	
2022	Meta Runner	Admin 3	
2022	Safelewds	Agnis Belladonna	
2023	Murder Drones	Amda (Drone 029)	
2023	ENA: Power of Potluck	Ena, Moony and Mask	
2023–2026	The Amazing Digital Circus	Pomni	
2024	PAIN GIRL	Penni Painkiller and Penni's Mom	
2024	Catching Up	Pink Cat	
2024	The Art of Murder	OC and Pip	
2025	Lycoris Recoil: Friends are thieves of time.	Chisato Nishikigi	
2026	asdfmovie16	Various characters	
2026	Welcome to Sucre Town	Mocha, Milk	
2026–present	Inanimate Insanity	Teddy Bear	"Point of No Return" onwards

=== Video games ===
Year	Title	Role	Notes	Source
2012	Dust: An Elysian Tail	Bopo		
2017	Fire Emblem Heroes	Thrasir, Larcei		
2018	Secret of Mana	Popoi	3D remake only	
2018	Dragalia Lost	Lily		
2019	My Time at Portia	Toby		
2019	Chocobo's Mystery Dungeon Every Buddy!	Croma		
2019	Pokémon Masters EX	Sabrina		
2020	Arknights	May		
2021	Cris Tales	Zas		
2021	Genshin Impact	Teucer, Yanfei		
2021	Kraken Academy!!	Broccoli Girl, Ana		
2022	Chocobo GP	Camilla		
2022	Azure Striker Gunvolt 3	Grazie		
2022	Goddess of Victory: Nikke	Shifty		
2023	Trinity Trigger	Lime Verte		
2023	Master Detective Archives: Rain Code	Karen		
2023	The Legend of Heroes: Trails into Reverie	Lapis Rosenberg		
2023	The Legend of Nayuta: Boundless Trails	Lyra Barton		
2023	Rhapsody II: Ballad of the Little Princess	Etoile Rosenqueen	Re-release	
2023	Rhapsody III: Memories of Marl Kingdom	Etoile Rosenqueen	Re-release	
2024	Unicorn Overlord	Kitra		
2024	Honkai: Star Rail	Sparkle, Sparxie		
2024	Duck Detective: The Secret Salami	Laura Angst		
2024	Persona 3 Reload	Metis	"The Answer" DLC	
2024	Card-en-Ciel	Winslyph, Alraune, Grazie		
2025	The Legend of Heroes: Trails Through Daybreak II	Altera/Lapis Rosenberg		
2025	ENA: Dream BBQ	Taski Maiden, Maude		
2025	Lunar Remastered Collection	Lemina Ausa		
2026	Final Fantasy Resonance	Fina		
2026	Cookie Run: Kingdom	Pomni Cookie		
