= Shin (given name) =

- Gender: Mostly male

Origin
- Origin: Japanese
- Meaning: Different meanings depending on kanji

Other names
- Related names: Shinzō; Shinji; Shingo; Shinichi

Shin (しん, シン) is a common Japanese given name which is mostly used for males.

== Written forms ==
Shin can be written using different kanji characters and can mean:

- 真, "true"
- 伸, "extend"
- 新, "new"
- 心, "heart"
- 信, "belief"
- 進, "progress"
- 慎, "humility"
- 晋, "advance"
- 紳, "gentleman"

The name can also be written in hiragana or katakana.

== People with the given name ==
- Shin Amano (真, born 1973), Japanese figure skater
- Shin Hirayama (信, 1868–1945), Japanese astronomer
- Shin Kishida (森, 1939–1982), Japanese actor
- Shin Kanemaru (信, 1914–1996), Japanese politician
- Shin Kanazawa (born 1983), Japanese football player
- Shin Kato (加藤 信; 1891–1952), Japanese Go player
- Shin Koyamada (真, born 1982), Japanese and American film actor
- Shin Nakamura (中村 伸; born 1974), Japanese footballer
- Shin Ōnuma (心), a Japanese animation and theatre director
- Shin Saburi (信, 1909–1982), Japanese film actor
- Shō Shin (1465–1526), king of the Ryūkyū Kingdom
- Shin Takahashi (しん, born 1967), Japanese manga artist
- Shin Terai, a Japanese musician and producer
- Shin Togashi (冨樫 森; born 1960), Japanese film director
- Shin Tsuchida (土田慎, born 1990), Japanese politician
- Shin Yahata (八幡 真; born 1974), Japanese ice hockey player
- Shin Yanagisawa (信, 1936–2008), Japanese photographer
- Shin Baseley or Itō Shin (真; born 2014), Japanese-Canadian male
- Shin (シン), a Japanese singer (former member of the Visual-Kei band Vivid)

== Fictional characters ==
- Shin Hati, a character in the Star Wars franchise.
- Shin Mitsurugi (御剣 信) a.k.a. Gregory Edgeworth, a character in the Ace Attorney videogame franchise.
- Shin Asuka, a character in the tokusatsu Ultraman Dyna
- Shinn Asuka, a character in the anime Mobile Suit Gundam SEED Destiny
- Shin Asakura, a character in the Japanese manga series Sakamoto Days
- Shin 心 a character in the japanese anime series dorohedoro
