= Shimoyama Station =

Shimoyama Station (下山駅) is the name of two train stations in Japan:

- Shimoyama Station (Kochi)
- Shimoyama Station (Kyoto)
