= Lycoris Recoil =

Japanese anime television series

- Key visual for the series
- Genre: Action (girls with guns); Slice of life
- Created by: Spider Lily (original work); Asaura (original story)
- Anime television series
- Directed by: Shingo Adachi
- Produced by: Manabu Jingūji; Yoshihiro Yoshida; Tomoyuki Owada
- Written by: Shingo Adachi
- Music by: Shūhei Mutsuki
- Studio: A-1 Pictures
- Licensed by: NA: Aniplex of America; SEA: Plus Media Networks Asia
- Original network: Tokyo MX, GYT, GTV, ABC TV, Nagoya TV, BS11, AT-X
- Original run: July 2, 2022 – September 24, 2022
- Episodes: 13 + 6 short films
- Manga
- Written by: Yasunori Bizen
- Published by: Media Factory
- English publisher: Yen Press
- Magazine: Monthly Comic Flapper
- Original run: September 5, 2022 – present
- Volumes: 9
- Light novel

Lycoris Recoil: Ordinary Days
- Written by: Asaura
- Illustrated by: Imigimuru
- Published by: ASCII Media Works
- English publisher: Yen Press
- Imprint: Dengeki Bunko
- Published: September 9, 2022
- Light novel

Lycoris Recoil: Recovery Days
- Written by: Asaura
- Illustrated by: Imigimuru
- Published by: ASCII Media Works
- English publisher: Yen Press
- Imprint: Dengeki Bunko
- Published: March 8, 2024
- Original net animation

Lycoris Recoil: Friends are thieves of time
- Directed by: Shingo Adachi
- Written by: Various
- Music by: Shūhei Mutsuki
- Studio: A-1 Pictures
- Licensed by: Crunchyroll (Note: In North America through Aniplex USA.)
- Released: April 16, 2025 – May 21, 2025
- Episodes: 6
- icon

Lycoris Recoil (Japanese: リコリス・リコイル, Hepburn: Rikorisu Rikoiru) is an original Japanese anime television series created by Spider Lily and Asaura. It was produced by A-1 Pictures and aired from July to September 2022. Set in Tokyo, the series follows two young orphaned teenage girls named Chisato Nishikigi and Takina Inoue, who were recruited in the Direct Attack organization to carry out assassinations under the "Lycoris" program while they work at a local café and perform various tasks such as childcare, shopping, and teaching classes.

A manga adaptation by Yasunori Bizen began serialization in Media Factory's manga magazine Monthly Comic Flapper in September 2022. A spin-off light novel, titled Lycoris Recoil: Ordinary Days, written by Asaura and illustrated by Imigimuru, was published under ASCII Media Works' Dengeki Bunko in September 2022 as well. A stage play adaptation of the series was performed in January 2023. An original net animation, titled Lycoris Recoil: Friends are thieves of time, was released from April to May 2025.

== Plot ==
Takina Inoue is a member of a government-sponsored all-female task force of assassins and spies made up of young orphaned girls known as "Lycoris", an undercover group named after the Lycoris radiata, who eliminate criminals and terrorists in Tokyo while disguised as high school students to maintain peace in Japan, with roots in a fictional pre-Meiji group named "Higanbana". (Note: Means Lycoris (red spider lilies) in Japanese, depicted in Episode 6)

However, during an operation to intercept a large exchange of firearms, Takina starts firing indiscriminately at the enemies in order to save a colleague who was taken hostage, jeopardizing the safety of other Lycoris in the process. As a result, the agency dismisses her for disobeying orders. She is then transferred to work with another Lycoris agent, the bubbly and pacifistic Chisato Nishikigi, who is known for her involvement in the destruction of the old radio tower, in a branch of the agency which operates undercover as a café called "LycoReco". Intending to be reinstated back to the agency, Takina cooperates with Chisato in managing the café, while the peace that is being protected by Lycoris is being challenged by terrorists led by the deranged Majima.

== Characters ==
=== Café LycoReco ===
Café LycoReco (喫茶リコリコ, Kissa Rikoriko), also known as Sweets&Cafe LycoReco, or commonly known as LycoReco, is a small neighborhood café located in Sumida, north of Kinshichō Station. The café has a wooden exterior with stained glass windows. It features elegant greenery with a notable cheery tree. This café specializes in selling Japanese desserts and high quality coffee. It also serves a variety of clients from middle schoolers to people in their 50s. Prior to its establishment, it was a facility operated by Direct Attack, a secret organization tasked with crime prevention in Japan and carries out its duties covertly through the use of female agents known as "Lycoris".

Chisato Nishikigi (錦木 千束, Nishikigi Chisato)
Voiced by: Chika Anzai (Japanese); Lizzie Freeman (English)
Portrayed by: Misato Kawauchi
A beautiful, highly skilled and happy-go-lucky Lycoris agent. She works at the LycoReco, a branch of Direct Attack (DA) that covers as a café serving both Western and Japanese sweets. Considered to be the agency's greatest agent in its history, Chisato can dodge bullets even at point blank range, a skill regarded as "superhuman". She uses a gun given to her when she was young by Yoshimatsu, a member of the Alan Institute, and loads it with rubber bullets. She possesses an artificial heart, provided by the Institute to extend her life. After defeating Majima, she and Takina move to Hawaii and set up a food truck.
Takina Inoue (井ノ上 たきな, Inoue Takina)
Voiced by: Shion Wakayama (Japanese); Xanthe Huynh (English)
Portrayed by: Sakiho Motonishi
A serious and confident young Lycoris agent. She possesses immense skills as a Lycoris agent, often going out of her way to complete missions on her own. After she indiscriminately fires at the enemies during an operation in order to save a colleague, the agency dismisses her, as she ignored orders and compromised the lives of the other agents at the scene. The agency transfers her to LycoReco. Wanting to be reinstated, she cooperates with Chisato on managing the café, as well as on their missions. Although at first she is often annoyed by Chisato's happy-go-lucky attitude, Takina comes to respect and appreciate her, and starts to consider Chisato her best friend and LycoReco as her new home. She also becomes a much nicer and less ruthless person thanks to Chisato's positive influence and altruism.
Kurumi (クルミ)
Voiced by: Misaki Kuno (Japanese); Lisa Reimold (English)
Portrayed by: Nonoka Obushi
A skilled hacker who goes under the code name "Walnut". She is first introduced wearing a squirrel suit. She is responsible for a hack of the DA's Radiata, (Note: Also named after the flower Lycoris radiata) an artificial intelligence regarded as being impenetrable. However, when her life is placed in danger due to competition from her rival "Robota", she requests security from LycoReco. After she was "killed" by mercenaries working under Robota, she starts living and working at LycoReco in exchange of support during LycoReco's missions. "Walnut" is actually the name of an artificial intelligence program she operates.
Mika (ミカ)
Voiced by: Kosuke Sakaki (Japanese); Bob Carter (English)
Portrayed by: Keigo Kitamura
An Afro-Japanese man who is the manager of LycoReco. Chisato views him and Yoshimatsu as her father figures, and Mika reciprocates her feelings. Later in the story, it is revealed that at one time Mika and Yoshimatsu were in a mutual same-sex relationship, raising and training Chisato as their surrogate daughter and the perfect weapon for DA. However, Mika's fatherly feelings became so strong that he changed his mind and left DA, though he continues to support the organization via LycoReco.
Mizuki Nakahara (中原 ミズキ, Nakahara Mizuki)
Voiced by: Ami Koshimizu (Japanese); Jennifer Losi (English)
Portrayed by: Mikako Ishii
A 27-year-old worker at LycoReco who was previously a member of the Intelligence Division of DA. She helps Chisato during her missions, notably when the hacker Walnut requests a security detail. She desperately desires to get married, even going so far as to accepting a job at LycoReco in hopes of meeting a man. She and Kurumi were about to move abroad after LycoReco closes down, only to remain in Japan to assist with the attack on Majima.

=== Direct Attack ===
A secret organization that prevents crime and terrorism via an all-female task force of assassins and spies made up of young orphaned girls known as Lycoris.

Fuki Harukawa (春川 フキ, Harukawa Fuki)
Voiced by: Maki Kawase (Japanese); Morgan Berry (English)
Portrayed by: Marina Tanoue
A First Lycoris agent and Takina's former team leader. She resents Takina for disobeying her orders and holds a rivalry with Chisato. She was among those who trained Chisato when she was still young.
Sakura Otome (乙女 サクラ, Otome Sakura)
Voiced by: Makoto Koichi (Japanese); Jeannie Tirado (English)
Portrayed by: Sakura Ayaki
A Second Lycoris agent who replaces Takina after she was dismissed by the agency. She is Fuki's partner and has an ambitious personality.
Kusunoki (楠木)
Voiced by: Yoko Soumi (Japanese); Kayleigh McKee (English)
Portrayed by: Natsuki Mieda
DA's commander, she oversees the operations of the entire organization. She prioritizes the secrecy of the agency from the public, even if it means using elaborate cover-ups on incidents and using Lycoris agents as scapegoats.

=== Alan Institute ===
An international organization that seeks to find and support geniuses.

Shinji Yoshimatsu (吉松 シンジ, Yoshimatsu Shinji)
Voiced by: Yōji Ueda (Japanese); D. C. Douglas^{Ep. 1 credits} (English)
Portrayed by: Kento Ono
A member of the Alan Institute, and one of the main antagonists. He sees Chisato as a weapon for killing, a vision he initially shared with Mika. He gave Chisato an artificial heart produced by the Institute, in hopes that she would become a skilled assassin. He frequently drops by LycoReco as a customer, though his true identity is initially kept secret from Chisato.

=== Others ===
Majima (真島)
Voiced by: Yoshitsugu Matsuoka (Japanese); Sean Chiplock (English)
Portrayed by: Hiroki Nakada
A psychopathic Alan Institute child who was also seen as a genius for killing and serves as the main antagonist. Unlike Chisato, Majima becomes a terrorist, seeking for a "balance" in an otherwise peaceful world. He is involved in several terrorist incidents, most notably during the destruction of the old radio tower and an attack on a metro station, though both are covered up by DA. He works with the hacker Robota to expose DA to the public and took an interest with Chisato after their encounter at the old radio tower attack. As he was initially born blind, he has developed a strong sense of hearing, which he can use to recognize people and events.
Robota (ロボ太)
Voiced by: Yuki Sakakihara (Japanese); Aleks Le^{Ep. 2 credits} (English)
Portrayed by: Rintaro Takeuchi
A hacker wearing a robot-shaped headgear who works with Majima in exposing DA. He regards himself as the "world's greatest hacker" after he "killed" Walnut. He provides support for Majima and his group.

== Development and production ==
When Asaura's former editor-in-charge had a meeting about Saekano with Shin-ichirō Kashiwada, a producer from A-1 Pictures, he spoke positively about the offbeat nature of Asaura's works. He then introduced Asaura to Kashiwada. Later, Asaura received an invitation to a new anime project. Kashiwada had read Asaura's Death Need Round, which is a "girls with guns" work before he invited Asaura to the project. Asaura, therefore, decided to include guns in the new story. He created the main characters and the worldview, with some deliverables including the synopsis and a few short novels. Asaura's initial pitch was rejected as too violent and dark to be broadcast on television, and the project went through some revisions before Adachi joined the project as director. Adachi introduced the idea of the DA organization and the Lycoris taskforce in order to connect Asaura's previously established narrative elements, and the work ultimately took on a lighter dramatic tone, with Adachi saying that his goal as series director was to make the viewers laugh every five minutes.

In an interview with Febri in August 2022, Adachi noted the influence of Tsukasa Hojo's City Hunter, how the show's setting changed from the original concept, and his desire to accurately depict action and "the way the guns are used", but also have the work appreciated by more than gun enthusiasts. He also told Febri that unlike other productions, he hardly drew any pictures on set, saying that animation and illustration was done by other staff members, like assistant director Maruyama Yusuke and animation leader Yamamoto Yumiko instead, but that he focused on storyboards, and noted they got cast members with a "lot of dubbing experience" to be part of the voice cast. In a previous interview, in June 2022, Asaura told Animate Times that he looked at the show's character designs "before the director" and that Takina was "almost unchanged" from the original proposal while Chisato was "completely different in the early stages."

Character designer Imigimuru became involved with the project after meeting Adachi at Winter Comiket. Having never done character art for an anime before, Imigimuru felt it would be impossible to do the job, especially finding three-dimensional art difficult as he never drew them before, but saw it as a lifetime opportunity so the designer accepted. In contrast of designing the backgrounds, he finds designing the characters to be easier as the premise and the personality of the characters had already been done before his involvement.

In Lycoris Recoil, some scenes take place in Sumida City, Tokyo, and features Kinshichō Park, Sumida Aquarium, water bus on Sumida River, aerial view of Ryōgoku, etc. On February 11, 2023, "Cafe LycoReco Presents After Party! Tomorrow is another day", was held at Sumida Triphony Hall, and the production of a new animation was announced during the event.

In June 2025, CyberAgent-owned Abema Times said that Spider Lily may be a specialized collective pseudonym for the anime's production staff since Lycoris (the first word of the series' name) is the genus name for the red spider lily.

=== Anime ===
Announced in December 2021, the series was produced by A-1 Pictures and directed by Shingo Adachi, and features an original story by Asaura, character designs by Imigimuru, and music composed by Shūhei Mutsuki. The series aired from July 2 to September 24, 2022, on Tokyo MX, GYT, GTV, and BS11.

In February 2023, a new animation project was announced. It was later revealed in July 2024 to be six animated short films which centered on the daily lives of the characters from the series. In January 2025, the new project was announced to be titled Lycoris Recoil: Friends are thieves of time and the staff in each short was unveiled. The short films were released on Aniplex's YouTube channel and other platforms from April 16 to May 21, 2025.

=== Music ===
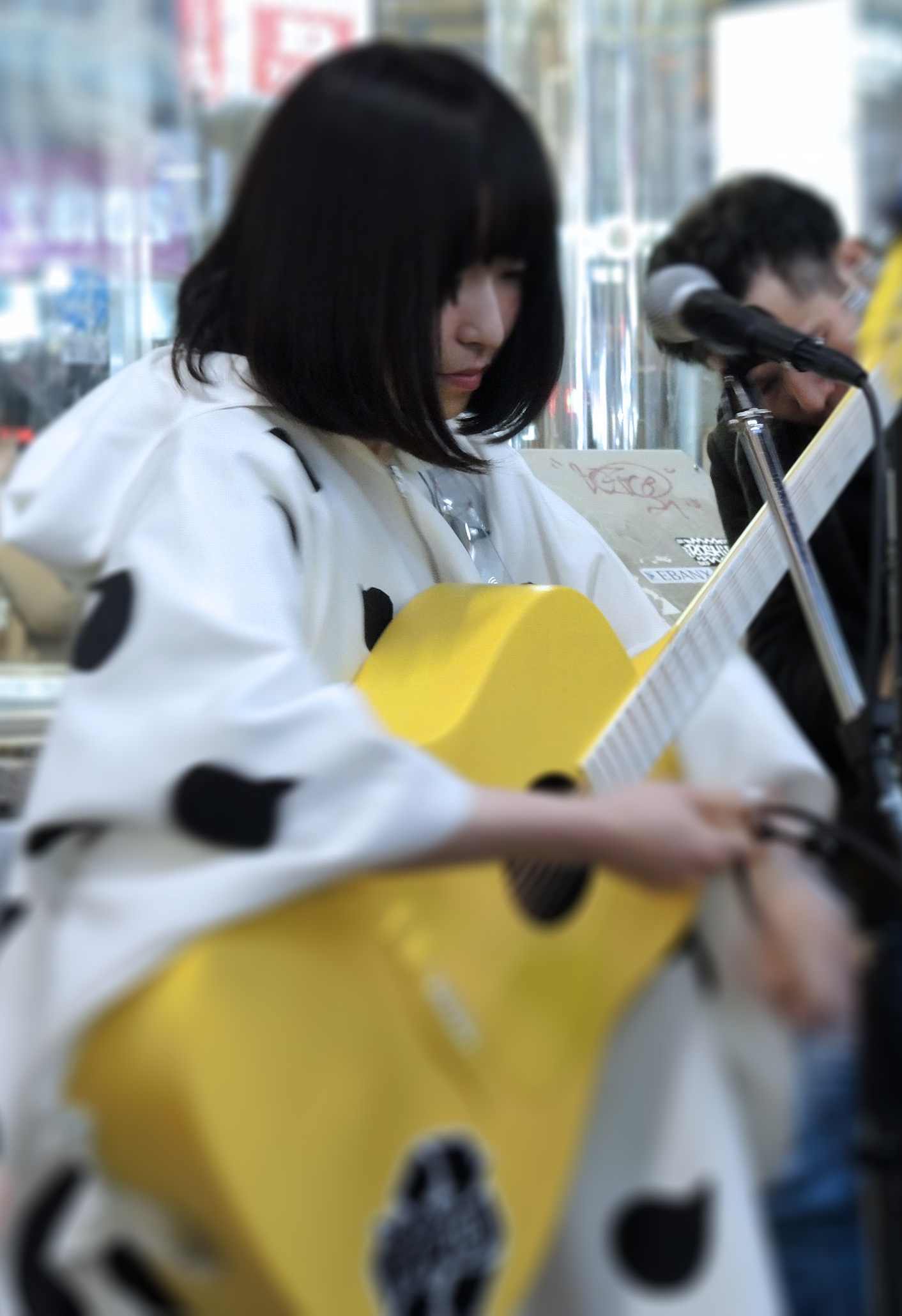
Sayuri performed the series ending, "Hana no Tō".

The music of the series is composed by (K)now Name member Shūhei Mutsuki. The opening theme song is "Alive" performed by ClariS, while the ending theme song is "Hana no Tō" (花の塔; lit. 'Tower of Flower') performed by Sayuri. The ending theme was released as a single on July 3, 2022, while the opening theme single was released on August 3, 2022.

=== International release and distribution ===
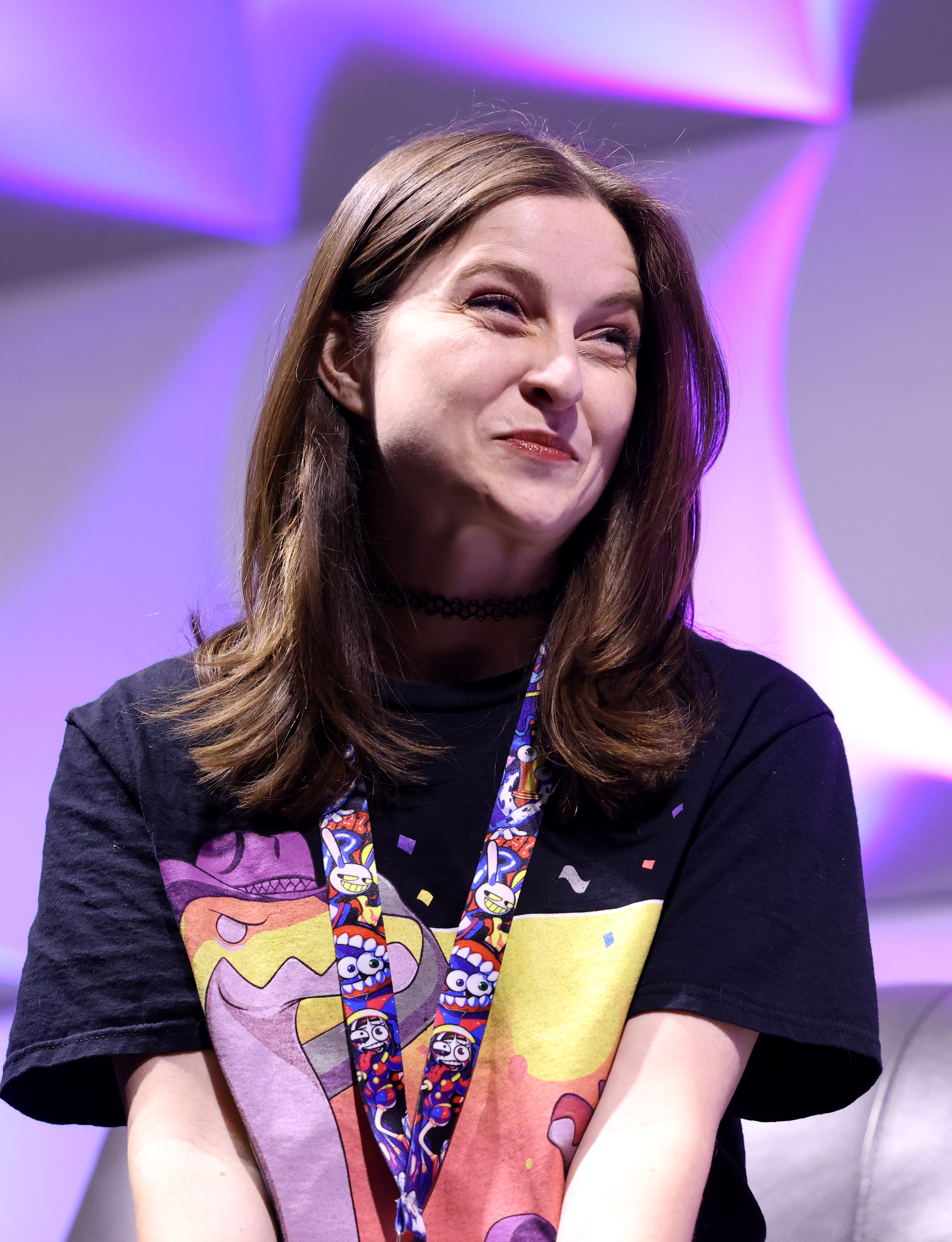
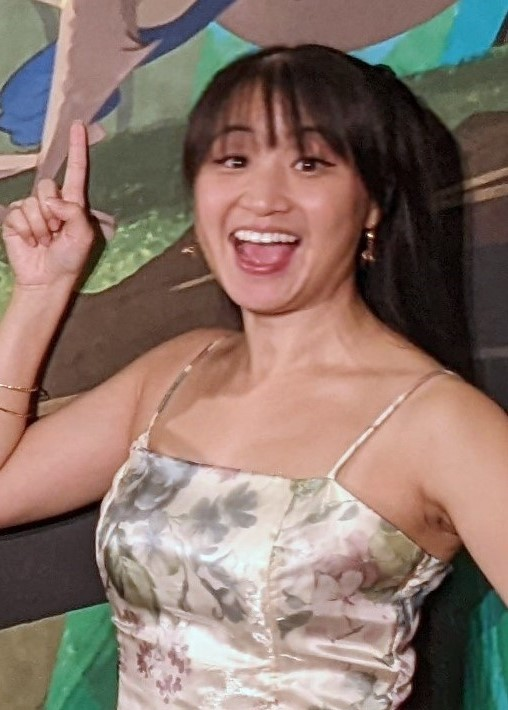
Lizzie Freeman (left) and Xanthe Huynh (right) provided the English voices of Chisato and Takina, respectively. The dub was commissioned by Bang Zoom! Studios of Burbank, California for Aniplex of America.

Lycoris Recoil is distributed and licensed by Aniplex of America. Crunchyroll streamed the series with a simuldub. The English dub was produced by Burbank-based Bang Zoom!, directed by Steve Staley, and the characters are voiced by Lizzie Freeman, Xanthe Huynh, Jennifer Losi, Lisa Reimold, and Bob Carter. In November 2023, Aniplex of America announced that the English dub would broadcast in the United States on Adult Swim's Toonami programming block, which aired from January 21 to April 14, 2024. The series was originally scheduled to be released on Blu-ray on August 22, 2023, but was delayed to September 19.

Plus Media Networks Asia licensed the series in Southeast Asia and aired it on Aniplus Asia.

In addition to the Aniplex and North American arm YouTube channels, the shorts also released on Crunchyroll. On June 7, 2025, the English dub for the shorts released on both Aniplex of America's YouTube channel and Crunchyroll, with the English cast reprising their roles.

== Other media ==
=== Manga ===
A manga adaptation by Yasunori Bizen began serialization in Media Factory's manga magazine Monthly Comic Flapper on September 5, 2022. The first volume of the manga was released on December 22, 2022, and an official anthology was released on the same date. The second volume of the manga adaptation was released on May 23, 2023, and a second comic anthology was released on May 26, 2023. The third volume of the manga was released on October 23, 2023. A third comic anthology was released on December 27, 2023.

The manga is licensed in North America by Yen Press.

==== Main series ====
No.	Original release date	Original ISBN	English release date	English ISBN
1	December 22, 2022	978-4-04-682030-3	October 15, 2024	979-8-8554-0106-6
Chapters 1–4
2	May 25, 2023	978-4-04-682470-7	February 18, 2025	979-8-8554-0538-5
Chapters 5–8
3	October 23, 2023	978-4-04-682940-5	June 24, 2025	979-8-8554-0540-8
Chapters 9–13
4	March 23, 2024	978-4-04-683411-9	October 28, 2025	979-8-8554-1568-1
Chapters 14–18
5	September 21, 2024	978-4-04-683856-8	June 23, 2026	979-8-8554-2872-8
Chapters 19–24
6	February 21, 2025	978-4-04-684497-2	March 23, 2027	979-8-8554-2874-2
Chapters 25–29
7	October 23, 2025	978-4-04-685011-9	—	—
Chapters 30–35
8	January 22, 2026	978-4-04-685523-7	—	—
Chapters 36–40
9	August 21, 2026	978-4-04-660379-1	—	—
Chapters 41–46

==== Spin-off: Recollect ====
No.	Japanese release date	Japanese ISBN
1	March 23, 2023	978-4-04-682359-5
Chapters 1–8; Omake
2	July 22, 2024	978-4-04-683393-8
Chapters 9–15; Omake

==== Anthology ====
No.	Title	Original release date	English release date
1	React リアクト	December 22, 2022; 978-4-04-682096-9	July 22, 2025; 979-8-8554-1490-5
"Commander Kusunoki's Planter" (楠木司令の植木箱(プランター), Kusunoki-shirei no Purantā); "A Tail Tale" (しっぽのきもち, Shippo no Kimochi); "Those LycoReco Days" (そんなリコリコの日々..., Sonna Rikoriko no Hibi); "Fed Up with Lycoris" (リコリス・こりごり, Rikorisu Korigori); "Happy Birthday"; "Reliant on Lycoris"; "Regular Workday" (通常営業, Tsūjō Eigyō)
2	Reload リロード	December 22, 2022; 978-4-04-914800-8	August 26, 2025; 979-8-8554-1498-1
"Poetic Justice"; "Let's Play!" (れっつぷれい!, Rettsu Purei!); "Sometime Later: Seek Nothing, Find Nothing" (その後のNothing seek, nothing find, Sono Ato no Nothing seek, nothing find); "Seeing Is Believing"; "Beware of Dog" (猛犬注意, Mōken Chūi); "Their Favorite" (ふたりの一番, Futari no Ichiban); "Let's Play a Game" (ゲームしようよ, Gēmu Shiyō yo); "Not Quite the Clean Potato"; "Leek, Cabbage, TLC" (ネギとキャベツとまごころと。, Negi to Kyabetsu to Magokoro to.); "Mizuki's Mixer Master Plan" (ミズキの合コン大作戦, Mizuki no Gōkon Daisakusen); "Midsummer Night's Dream"; "Let's Go to Universe Catland" (レッツゴーウチュウキャットランド, Rettsu Gō Uchū Kyattorando); "Enjoying Your Enjoyment" (あなたの好きが好き, Anata no Suki ga Suki); "It's Not a Piece of Cake!"; "The End of a Dream" (ユメノオワリ, Yume no Owari)
3	Repeat リピート	December 22, 2022; 978-4-04-682054-9	September 23, 2025; 979-8-8554-1484-4
"LycoReco Promotion" (リコリコ・テコイレ, Rikoriko Tekoire); "The Practice Date Is a Duel!?" (練習デートは真剣勝負!?, Renshū Dēto wa Shinken Shōbu!?); "Undercover School Mission!" (学園潜入ミッション!, Gakuen Sennyū Misshon!); "Café LycoReco's New Style!" (喫茶リコリコに新風を!, Kissa Rikoriko ni Shinpū o!); "Might Cry" (いつかの涙, Itsuka no Namida); "Second Outing" (セカンドさんぽ, Sekando Sanpo); "Takina the Guard Dog" (番犬たきな, Ganken Takina); "Chasing Consideration" (優しさのおいかけっこ, Yasashisa no Oikakekko); "The Two of Us Together" (ふたりで一緒に, Futari de Issho ni); "Always Room for Sweets!" (甘いものは別腹!, Amai Mono wa Betsubara!); "Takina the Penny-Pinching Warrior" (節約戦士たきなさん, Setsuyaku Senshi Takina-san); "Hug and Recoil" (ハグとリコイル, Hagu to Rikoiru); "Live the Life You Love"; "One Day, at the Safe House..." (某日某潜伏場所にて..., Bōjitsu Bōsenpuku Basho ni te...)
4	Repeat 2 リピート2	March 23, 2023; 978-4-04-682357-1	April 28, 2026; 979-8-8554-1486-8
"We Can Do It Too" (私たちにはできないはずがない, Watashitachi ni wa dekinai hazu ga nai); "Treasure"; "The Pot Calling the Kettle Black"; "Takina vs. Vending Machine" (たきなvs自販機, Takina vs jihanki); "Teatime Mission" (ティータイム・ミッション, Tītaimu misshon); "Pupcup" (ワンカップ, Wankappu); "Takina's Selfie Challenge" (たきな自撮りチャレンジ, Takina jidori charenji); "Playing Tag"; "Lycoris Battling Deadlines" (締切リコリス, Shimekiri rikorisu); "Dream Cohabiting?" (夢の共同生活, Yume no kyōdō seikatsu); "LycoReco Paradise" (リコリコ・ゴクらク, Rikoriko gokuraku); "Chisato Time" (千束のお時間, Chisato no o jikan)
5	Reload 2 リロード2	May 26, 2023; 978-4-04-915015-5	March 24, 2026; 979-8-8554-1500-1
"Baby Squirrel"; "Make Peace with the Cat"; "Me and You, Always"; "Lycoris Escape Drama" (リコリス脱出剧, Rikorisu dasshutsu geki); "Idolization" (礼賛, Raisan); "Ignorance is Bliss"; "Kurumi, My Love" (クルミ my lo v e, Kurumi my love); "Here Today, Here Tomorrow" (今日も明日もここに, Kyōmoashitamo koko ni); "My Weapon" (私の武器, Watashi no buki); "First Errand" (はじめてのおつかい, Hajimetenōtsukai); "First, Some Sleep" (まず、おやすみから, Mazu, oyasumi kara); "Every Dog Has Its Day"; "Relax, Idiot" (安心しとけバカ, Anshin shi toke baka); "The Famous Café LycoReco" (ウワサの喫茶リコリコ, Uwasa no kissa rikoriko)
6	Repeat 3 リピート3	December 22, 2023; 978-4-04-683243-6	April 27, 2027; 979-8-8554-1488-2
7	Reload 3 リロード3	December 27, 2023; 978-4-04-915426-9	October 27, 2026; 979-8-8554-1502-5

=== Light novel ===
A spin-off light novel, titled Lycoris Recoil: Ordinary Days, written by Asaura and illustrated by Imigimuru, was published under ASCII Media Works' Dengeki Bunko imprint on September 9, 2022. Another light novel with a new story was released on March 8, 2024.

The light novels are also licensed in North America by Yen Press.

No.	Title	Original release date	English release date
1	Lycoris Recoil: Ordinary Days リコリス・リコイル Ordinary days	September 9, 2022; 978-4-04-914618-9	February 11, 2025; 978-1-9753-9350-2
Intro 1; Chapter 1: Sweetening the Twilight Years; Intro 2; Chapter 2: Gunfight, Coffee, and Chisato's Red Flowers; Intro 3; Chapter 3: Takina's Cooking; Intro 4; Chapter 4: LycoReco of the Dead; Intro 5; Chapter 5: May I Take Your Order?; Outro
2	Lycoris Recoil: Recovery Days リコリス・リコイル Recovery days	March 8, 2024; 978-4-04-915554-9	March 10, 2026; 979-8-8554-3198-8
Chapter 0: And So, the Curtain Rises; Chapter 1: Safety Work; Chapter 2: Dog; Chapter 3: Cough; Chapter 4: One's Duties; Chapter 5: Common Occurrence; Post-Credits Scene: And So, Once More
3	Lycoris Recoil: Gluttony Days リコリス・リコイル Gluttony days	January 9, 2026; 978-4-04-916060-4	—

=== Stage plays ===
A stage play adaptation was announced on November 18, 2022. It was performed at Tennozu Galaxy Theater from January 7 to 15, 2023, produced by Office Endless, directed by Akira Yamazaki, and written by Yо̄ Hosaka. A sequel titled Lycoris Recoil: Life Won't Wait was performed with the same main cast and crew at Theatre G-Rosso in Tokyo Dome City from June 7 to 16, 2024.

=== Web novel ===
An official Note account of the anime was established on November 25, 2023. New stories written by Asaura are serialized and published weekly in this Note account.

=== Internet radio ===
"LycoReco Radio" began airing every Friday from July 8, 2022, and every other week from October 7, 2022, to March 24, 2023. A total of 27 episodes were streamed on the Aniplex official YouTube channel and the anime's official website. The personalities were Chika Anzai (voice of Chisato Nishikigi) and Shion Wakayama (voice of Takina Inoue). The scriptwriter and director was Hiroshi Nagata. A public recording of the "LycoReco Radio Special Edition" was held on November 13, 2022, as a Blu-ray & DVD release commemorative event. Following the end of LycoReco Radio, a "LycoReco Radio Presents After Party!" event was held at AnimeJapan 2023 on March 25, 2023. In AnimeJapan 2023, an announcement was made that "Lycoris Recoil Radio will be returning", and on July 2 of the same year, "Lycoris Recoil Radio Anime Lycoris Recoil 1st Anniversary" was streamed to commemorate the first anniversary of the broadcast.

== Cultural impact and reception ==
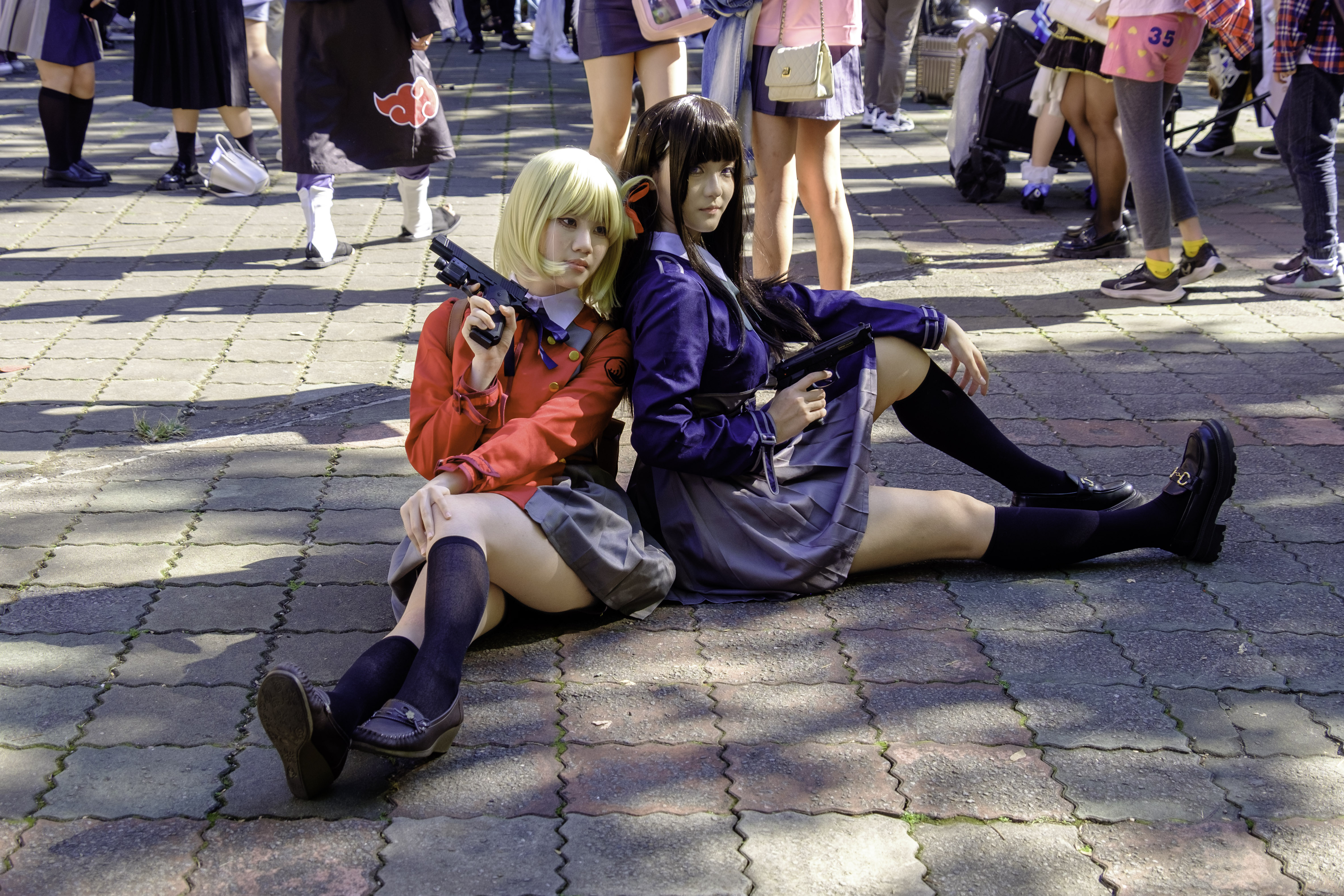
Cosplayers of Chisato Nishikigi and Takina Inoue at Comic World Taiwan 65

=== Audience response ===
Lycoris Recoil ranked first in the Anime Corner Summer 2022 Weekly Poll chart for three consecutive weeks since its premiere and would eventually top the site's Summer 2022 Anime of the Season Ranking. The series would end up in eighth place for Anime Corner's 2022 Anime of the Year Ranking. In a survey of "Favorite TV Anime of 2022" by Japanese anime website AnimeAnime.jp, Lycoris Recoil ended up on the number one spot, with a reported 12.3% of the overall vote. By August 24, 2022, Lycoris Recoil became the "Most-Watched Anime from the summer season" in Japan, ranking sixth place overall among the "Top 10 Most-Watched Anime in Japan" for August 2022; the series retained sixth place on the list for September 2022.

In a tweet, Metal Gear series creator Hideo Kojima praised Lycoris Recoil. Kojima later accepted a request to write an endorsement which was slated to be featured on the cover of Lycoris Recoil: Ordinary Days, the series' then upcoming light novel spinoff. On August 22, 2022, Kadokawa stated that the novel had sold so well in pre-orders that they had requested a second printing ahead of its September 9 release, which series creator Asaura noted was a rare occurrence. The total number of copies in circulation exceeded 100,000 even before its release. With reprints after its release, the number of copies in circulation for the physical edition reached 200,000 on September 25, 2022. On November 25, 2022, it was announced that the total number of copies in circulation, both physical and digital, had exceeded 250,000 "just over a month after its release." According to Oricon research, as of December 2022, the game had sold an estimated 142,610 copies, ranking fifth in the 2022 light novel annual sales ranking (by title). As of March 2024, the total number of copies in circulation for the novel series had exceeded 500,000.

=== Sales ===
The first volume of the Blu-ray release became the "Best-Selling TV Anime Disc of 2022" in Japan, with around 29,414 copies sold as of November 19, 2022. The second volume of the Blu-ray release sold around 22,322 copies in its first five days of sales. The third volume of the Blu-ray release sold 23,937 copies as of November 27, 2022. The fourth volume of the Blu-ray release sold 21,534 copies as of December 25, 2022.

In its yearly sales chart, Oricon revealed that Lycoris Recoil: Ordinary Days became the fifth best-selling individual light novel volume in Japan, having sold an estimated 142,610 physical copies.

By March 2024, Crunchyroll reported that the light novel franchise had sold over 500,000 copies.

=== Critical reception ===
Contributors at Anime News Network and Anime Feminist gave the series gave a mixed reception in their premiere reviews. The series was praised for the characters, visuals, action scenes and voice acting, but was also criticized for its writing, tonal shifts and "glorification" of political and state violence. In Anime News Network's full review of the first three episodes, published later, Christopher Farris praised the series for its revival of the girls with guns subgenre, the characters, and action sequences. However, he expressed some concern that its attempt to combine the genre with slice of life story elements could become "mere distractions" and potentially sidestep any narrative address of the premise's political implications.

Discussing the first four episodes in Anime Feminist's "check-in" for the summer 2022 anime season, Caitlin Moore described the series as strong entertainment, praising the action, visuals, and character designs, as well as the possible queer subtext of the relationships but noted the perceived tonal dissonance and continued lack of clarity as to its moral or political positions on the subject matter of state violence. In her review of the series, Yuricon founder Erica Friedman said she would not have watched until someone described it as "John Wick with cute girls" on social media, and she stated that she enjoyed it, calling it "John Wick with moe-faced girls" despite its flaws including having 16-year-olds as experts at assassination, obvious reveals, and character types rather than characters. She also argued that the yuri elements in the series are only implied or subtextual, comparing Chisato and Takina with "traditional Yuri trope pair", criticized outdated translation choices that failed to mitigate some problematic aspects of the narrative, the art as "pretty bad," and rated the series as a 7/10, noting some fan service with "underwear-level humor" and Takina and Chisato's dynamic between "butch and femme" and "sister in arms".

Critics and reviewers for IGN, Common Sense Media, Game Rant, Collider, and CBR praised the series for its humor, fights, and action fitting with the girls with guns sub-genre, while some criticized it for plot issues and gender stereotypes. Kambole Campbell praised the series for its compelling entertainment value, its mundane scenes and playfulness with "romance tropes," and references to Georges Méliès, The Terminator, and John Wick while criticizing it for an "unwieldy tangle of its larger plot." Danae Stahlnecker of Common Sense Media provided a guide to parents for the series and noted that the series had positive themes about "value of life and helping others" but has infrequent cursing, partial nudity in some scenes, and "positive disability representation" while praising diverse and complex personalities among female characters. She also criticizing moments where some characters reinforce "gender stereotypes about fashion, food, and friendships" and said the series has a "quite touching" story beyond the "silly premise", bringing in themes of the action, comedy, and slice of life genres.

Harry Nugraha of Game Rant described possible reasons that the series is popular, including featuring "cute girls with guns" like Puella Magi Madoka Magica, Sword Art Online spinoff Gun Gale Online, and Girls und Panzer, showing "hot and cold pairs" in a refreshing way and remaining easygoing but also thrilling. Emily Kavanagh of Collider said the series "challenges the conventions" among action anime, not by trying to deconstruct it, but taking the genre's convention and molding them into "something more modern and thoughtful," positioning the female characters as having "their own agency" rather than be "fawned over by a leering audience" even as the characters can be childish in some ways, and praised the series for its "unique take" on the toll on human life from violence. Kelvin Kwao of CBR described the series as "largely underrated by the anime community", arguing it combines the best parts of the action-adventure and slice-of-life anime into one series, and speculated why the series wasn't more popular.

Some reviewed the light novel spinoff, Lycoris Recoil Ordinary Days. In her review of the first volume, Yuricon founder Erica Friedman wrote that although she saw the yuri elements in the original series as merely fuel for interpretations and to attracting yuri fans, she found the yuri in the light novel to be much more bold and refuting her original opinion, as in one of the chapters, Takina seemed to begin to "realize some kind of attraction to Chisato". However, she called the final story in the light novel problematic because readers have to watch "a middle-school girl being bullied and tortured" with only the promise of "future retribution" and rated it as a 6/10, while noting that some boys' love themes were also present. In the end, since the light novel was written by the original creator of the series, Friedman suggested that the events described could be successfully turned into episodes of the new season.

=== Accolades ===
Year	Ceremony	Category	Recipient	Result	Ref.
2022	Reiwa Anisong Awards	Anime Song Grand Prize	"Hana no Tō" by Sayuri	Won	
2022	Reiwa Anisong Awards	Best Work Award	"Alive" by ClariS	Nominated	
2022	Reiwa Anisong Awards	Artist Song Award	"Hana no Tō" by Sayuri	Nominated	
2022	Reiwa Anisong Awards	User Voting Award	"Hana no Tō" by Sayuri	Won	
2022	Reiwa Anisong Awards	User Voting Award	"Alive" by ClariS	2nd place	
2022	AT-X	Top Anime Ranking	Lycoris Recoil	Won	
2023	D-Anime Store Awards	Best Worldbuilding	Lycoris Recoil	Won	
2023	D-Anime Store Awards	Best Story	Lycoris Recoil	Won	
2023	9th Anime Trending Awards	Anime of the Year	Lycoris Recoil	3rd place	
2023	9th Anime Trending Awards	Girl of the Year	Chisato Nishikigi	3rd place	
2023	9th Anime Trending Awards	Girl of the Year	Takina Inoue	7th place	
2023	9th Anime Trending Awards	Couple or Ship of the Year	Chisato and Takina	4th place	
2023	9th Anime Trending Awards	Supporting Girl of the Year	Kurumi	8th place	
2023	9th Anime Trending Awards	Best in Animation	Lycoris Recoil	6th place	
2023	9th Anime Trending Awards	Best in Character Design	Lycoris Recoil	Won	
2023	9th Anime Trending Awards	Best in Episode Directing and Storyboard	"Nothing seek, nothing find"	8th place	
2023	9th Anime Trending Awards	Best in Original Screenplay	Lycoris Recoil	2nd place	
2023	9th Anime Trending Awards	Ending Theme Song of the Year	"Hana no Tō" by Sayuri	6th place	
2023	9th Anime Trending Awards	Action or Adventure Anime of the Year	Lycoris Recoil	2nd place	
2023	9th Anime Trending Awards	Drama Anime of the Year	Lycoris Recoil	Won	
2023	9th Anime Trending Awards	Best Voice Acting Performance – Female	Chika Anzai as Chisato Nishikigi	2nd place	
2023	7th Crunchyroll Anime Awards	Anime of the Year	Lycoris Recoil	Nominated	
2023	7th Crunchyroll Anime Awards	Best Director	Shingo Adachi	Nominated	
2023	7th Crunchyroll Anime Awards	Best Main Character	Chisato Nishikigi	Nominated	
2023	7th Crunchyroll Anime Awards	Best Original Anime	Lycoris Recoil	Won	
2023	7th Crunchyroll Anime Awards	Best New Series	Lycoris Recoil	Nominated	
2023	7th Crunchyroll Anime Awards	Best Action	Lycoris Recoil	Nominated	
2023	7th Crunchyroll Anime Awards	Best Voice Artist Performance (Japanese)	Chika Anzai as Chisato Nishikigi	Nominated	
2023	7th Crunchyroll Anime Awards	Best Voice Artist Performance (Spanish)	Diana Castañeda as Chisato Nishikigi	Nominated	
2023	13th Newtype Anime Awards	Best Work (TV)	Lycoris Recoil	4th place	
2023	13th Newtype Anime Awards	Best Director	Shingo Adachi	7th place	
2023	13th Newtype Anime Awards	Best Theme Song	"Hana no Tō" by Sayuri	5th place	
2023	AT-X	Top Anime Ranking	Lycoris Recoil	19th place	
2023	AT-X 25th Anniversary	Favorite Series	Lycoris Recoil	4th place	
2023	AT-X 25th Anniversary	Recommended Series	Lycoris Recoil	4th place	
2023	AT-X 25th Anniversary	Favorite Anisong	"Alive" by ClariS	4th place	

== See also ==
- Ben-To, a light novel series written by Asaura
- Too Many Losing Heroines!, a light novel series illustrated by Imigimuru and an anime produced by the same studio
- This Art Club Has a Problem!, a manga series illustrated by Imigimuru
