= Shinji Takahashi =

Shinji Takahashi may refer to:

- Shinji Takahashi (religious leader) (高橋 信次, 1927–1976), Japanese religious leader
- Shinji Takahashi (baseball) (高橋 信二, born 1978), Japanese baseball player
- Shinji Takahashi (sport shooter) (高橋 信司, born 1937), Japanese sport shooter
- Shinji Takahashi (volleyball) (髙橋 慎治, born 1980), Japanese volleyball player
