= Shinji Fukuda =

Japanese poop expert

Shinji Fukuda (福田真嗣, Fukuda Shinji) is the Project Professor at the Institute for Advanced Biosciences, Keio University, in Tsuruoka, Japan. He is a leading researcher in the field of gut microbiome analysis and evaluation.

Known for his efforts to raise awareness about the importance of gut health, he often refers to feces as "brown gems".

== Background ==
From a young age, Fukuda was fascinated by microorganisms. This interest was solidified when he received a microscope for his 10th birthday, which set him on the path to a career in science. He became interested in the world of intestinal environment research at the university where he entered to study biotechnology.

Fukuda completed his doctoral program in agricultural science at Meiji University Graduate School in 2006, and subsequently obtained a Ph.D. in gut microbiology. He then joined Riken as a special researcher. In 2012, he became a project associate professor at the Institute for Advanced Biosciences, Keio University, and was later promoted to project professor.

Additionally, in 2015, he became a researcher at the Japan Science and Technology Agency and has been serving as the president and CEO of Metagen Inc. concurrently since the same year. He also holds positions as a visiting professor at the University of Tsukuba's Faculty of Medicine, group leader at the Kanagawa Prefectural Institute of Industrial Science and Technology, and visiting professor at the Malaysia-Japan International Institute of Technology, University of Technology Malaysia.

Furthermore, he is the founder of and senior scientific advisor to Metagen Therapeutics Inc., director of Metagen Singapore Pte. Ltd., the representative director of the Japan Gut Design Association, and Specially Appointed Professor at the Graduate School of Medicine, Juntendo University.

He is active in the media to implement his research and ideas on a social scale. His work has been featured in the Financial Times and in 2023, he delivered a TEDx talk titled "Who's in charge - Human or Bacteria?" where he discusses how gut microbiome affects human emotions and behavior. He has also been selected for Highly Cited Researchers 2024.

== Awards and honors ==
- 2013: Young Scientists' Prize from the Ministry of Education, Culture, Sports, Science and Technology (MEXT)
- 2014: Mishima Kaiun Academic Award
- 2014: Yamagata Prefecture Science and Technology Encouragement Award
- 2015: Selected for MEXT's "Contributions to Science and Technology 2015"
- 2015: Bioscience Grand Prize for Best Business Plan for "Creating a Healthy Society from Feces"
- 2016: Ando Momofuku Award for Invention and Discovery Encouragement
- 2017: Bioindustry Encouragement Award
