= Shinji Komiyama =

Japanese baseball player (born 1985)

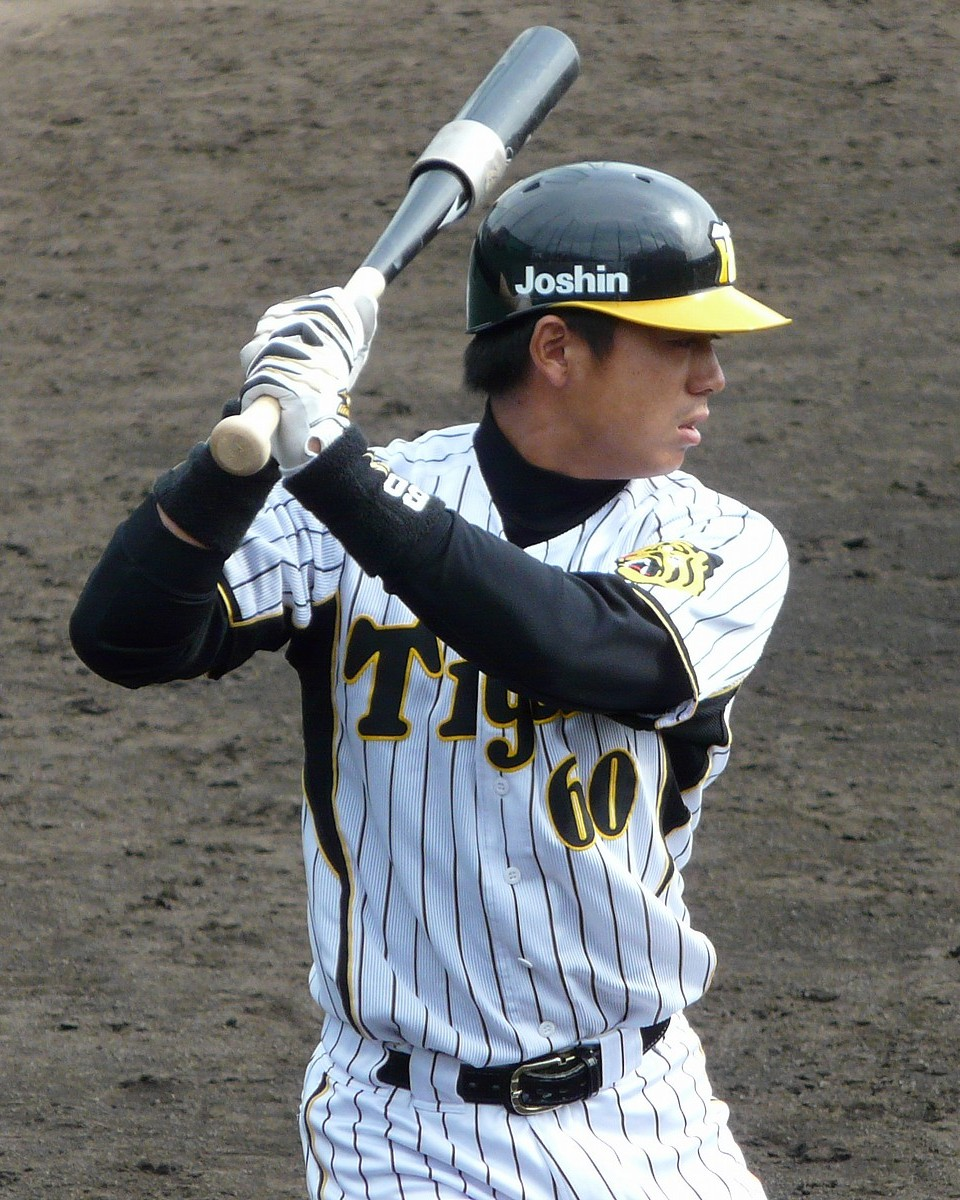
- Komiyama with the Hanshin Tigers
- Catcher
- Born: November 26, 1985 (age 40); Atsugi, Kanagawa, Japan
- Bats: Right Throws: Right

NPB debut
- October 3, 2007, for the Hanshin Tigers

NPB statistics (through 2016)
- Batting average: .164
- Home runs: 1
- RBI: 8
- Stats at Baseball Reference

Teams
- Hanshin Tigers (2007–2008, 2010–2013, 2015–2016)

Shinji Komiyama (小宮山慎二, Komiyama Shinji; born November 26, 1985) is a Japanese former professional baseball catcher in Japan's Nippon Professional Baseball. he played for the Hanshin Tigers from 2007 to 2016.
