= Shin'ichi Ishiwata =

Japanese scientist

Shin'ichi Ishiwata (石渡 信一, Ishiwata Shin'ichi) is a Japanese scientist, a professor at Waseda University department of science and engineering physics course. His specialty is biophysics, particularly the mechanism of muscles and motor proteins.

Since spectroscopic techniques for studying proteins yielded only averaged characteristics of an ensemble of proteins, he constructed his own research method. He focused on his long-held interest in striated muscle— “how a beautiful structure is self-organized, and how it is related to force-generating function.”

Then he tackled the reconstitution of the structure and function of the thin (actin) filaments in striated muscle, especially cardiac muscle, then to defining the mechanism of Spontaneous Oscillatory Contraction (SPOC) of striated muscle that occurs at intermediate activation conditions between full activation and relaxation. It was an important breakthrough regarding a phenomenon that had been “almost completely ignored,” he says.

Ishiwata's research interests go beyond the mechanical and physiological import of SPOC to bio-motile systems focusing on the structural and functional hierarchy from single molecules (myosin, kinesin, actin) to macromolecular assemblies (myofibrils, meiotic spindle and cells (cardiac, HeLa, etc.). He expects that the multiplex network of Chemo-Mechanical Feedback (CMF) loops exist over various hierarchical levels. He proposes that the heart is a typical organ in which nano and macro, i.e., mechano-chemical functions of molecular motors and heartbeat, are directly coupled to each other through the CMF loops.
