= Shinji Kanki =

Japanese composer

Shinji Kanki is a Japanese composer. He has composed music for dolphins according to conventions found in dolphin music or found to please dolphins in his Music for Dolphins (Ultrasonic Improvisational Composition) for underwater ultrasonic loudspeakers (2001).

Other of his pieces include PCM 0355+53 for the Helsinki Computer Orchestra.
