= Shin'ichi Tanaka (photographer) =

Japanese photographer

Shin'ichi Tanaka (田中 新一, Tanaka Shin'ichi; birth and death years unknown) was a renowned Japanese photographer active in the 1930s.
