= Shinji Shimoyama =

Japanese baseball player and coach (born 1975)

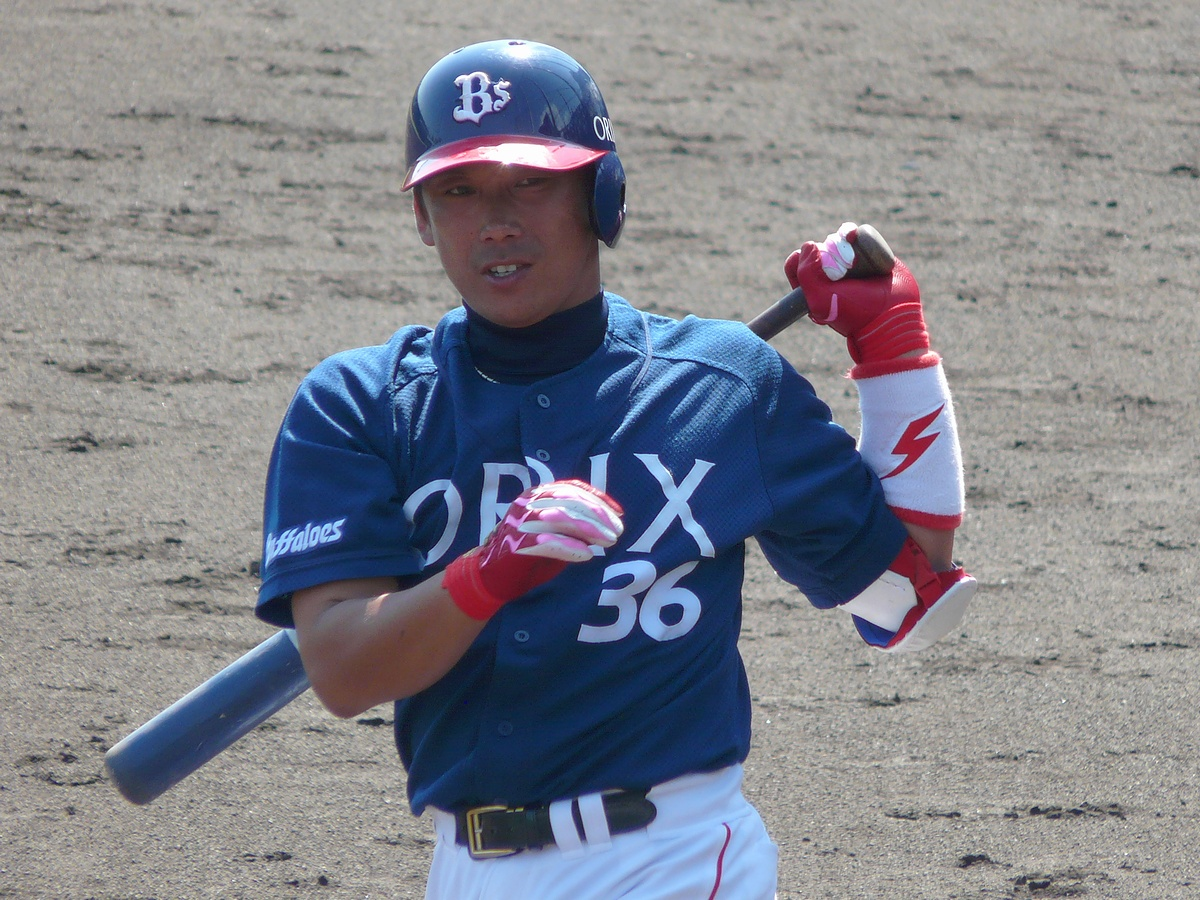
- Outfielder / Coach
- Born: December 1, 1975 (age 50); Katō District, Hyōgo
- Bats: Right Throws: Right

NPB debut
- March 30, 2003, for the Osaka Kintetsu Buffaloes

NPB statistics (through 2011 season)
- Batting average: .260
- Hits: 358
- RBIs: 166
- Stats at Baseball Reference

Teams
- As player: Osaka Kintetsu Buffaloes (2003 – 2004); Orix Buffaloes (2005 – 2011); As coach: Orix Buffaloes (2012 – 2019)
- Last updated on: 17 June 2018

Shinji Shimoyama (下山 真二, Shimoyama Shinji; born December 1, 1975 in Katō District, Hyōgo, Japan) is a former Japanese professional baseball player. He was the number 8 draft pick for the Osaka Kintetsu Buffaloes in 2003.
