= Theatre photography =

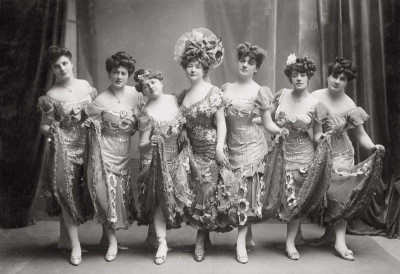
Grisettes of the Theater an der Wien in Ludwig Gutmann's workshop 1906

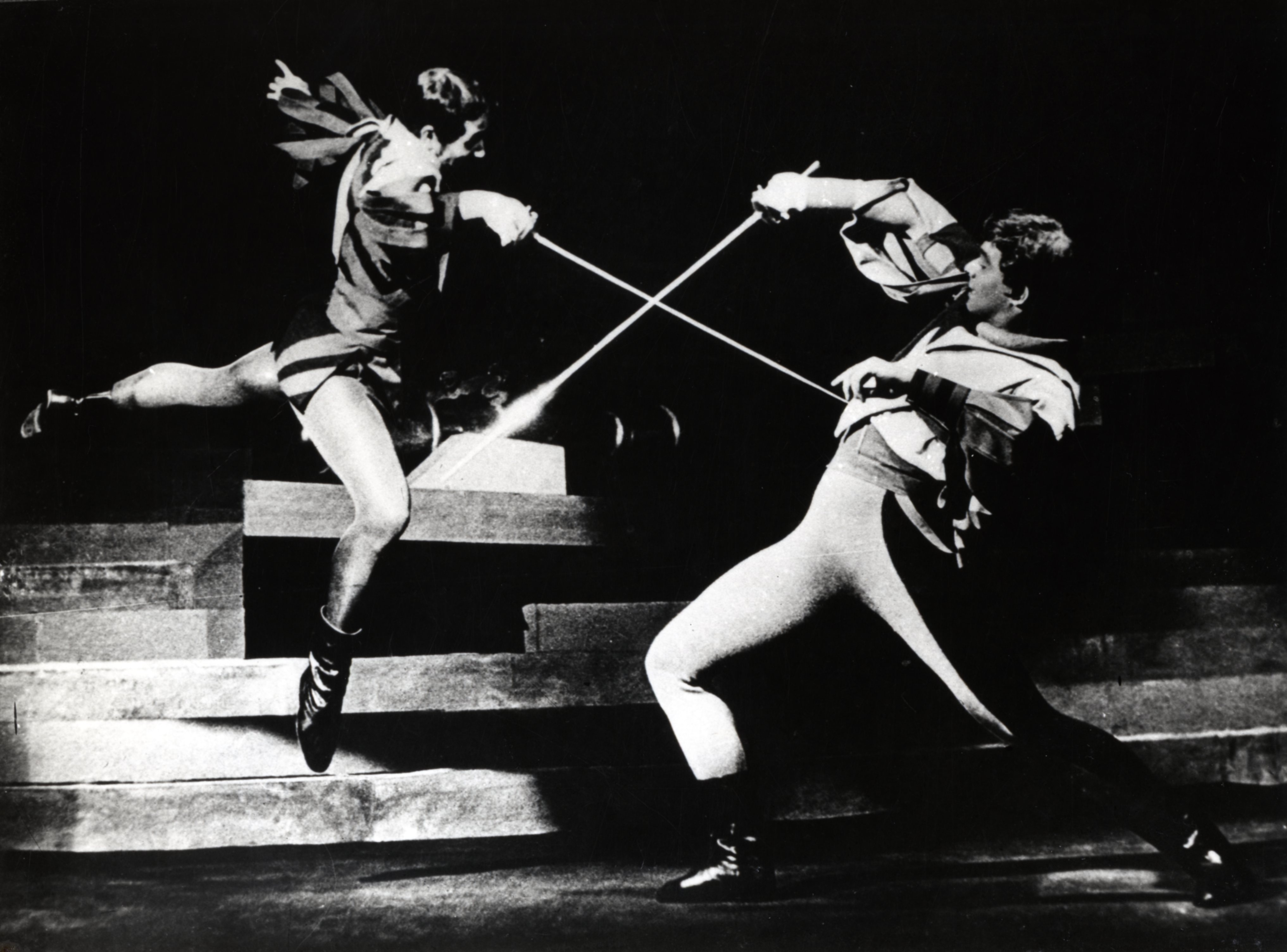
Othello, ballet at the J. K. Tyl Theatre, Plzen 1960

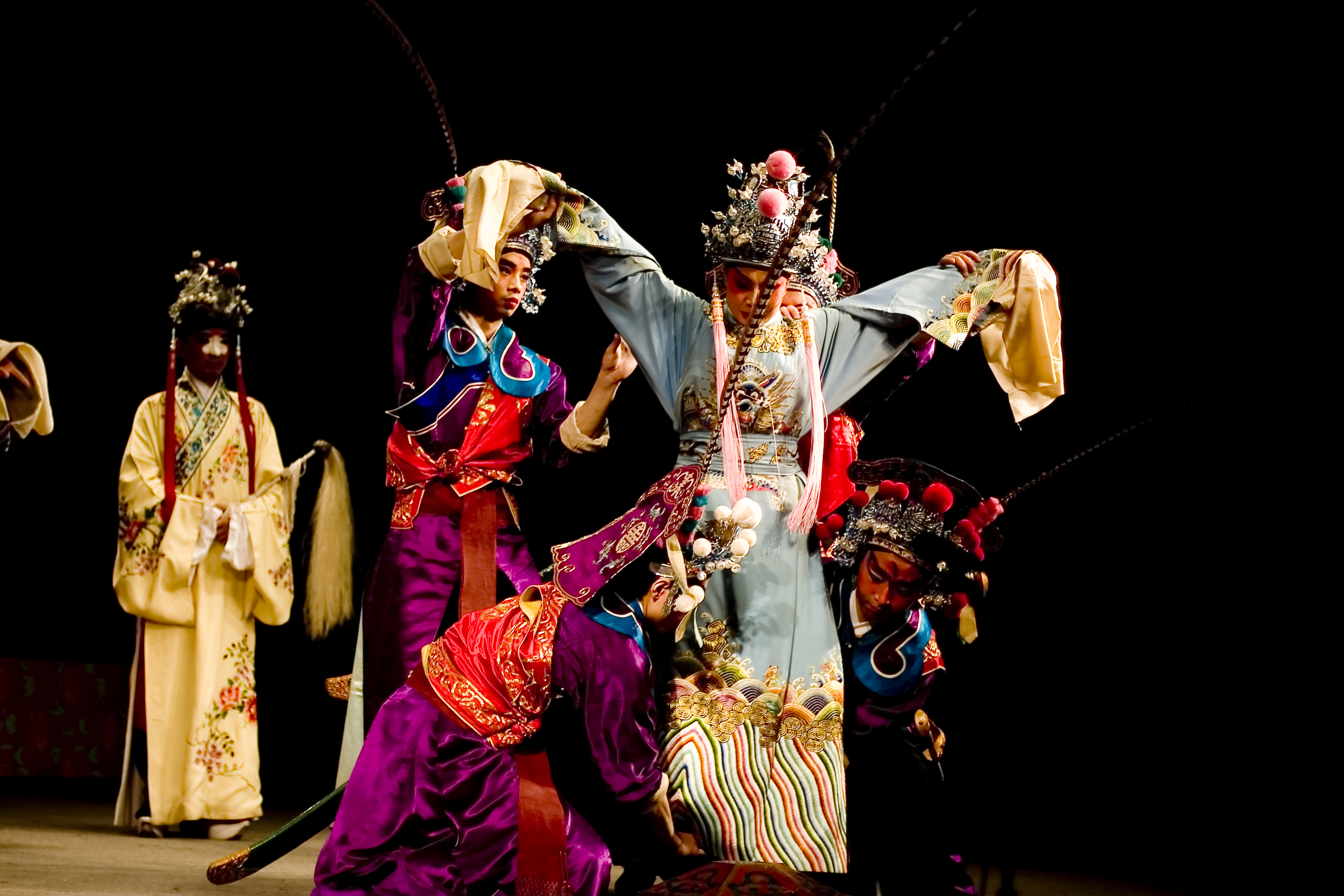
Sichuan opera, 2008

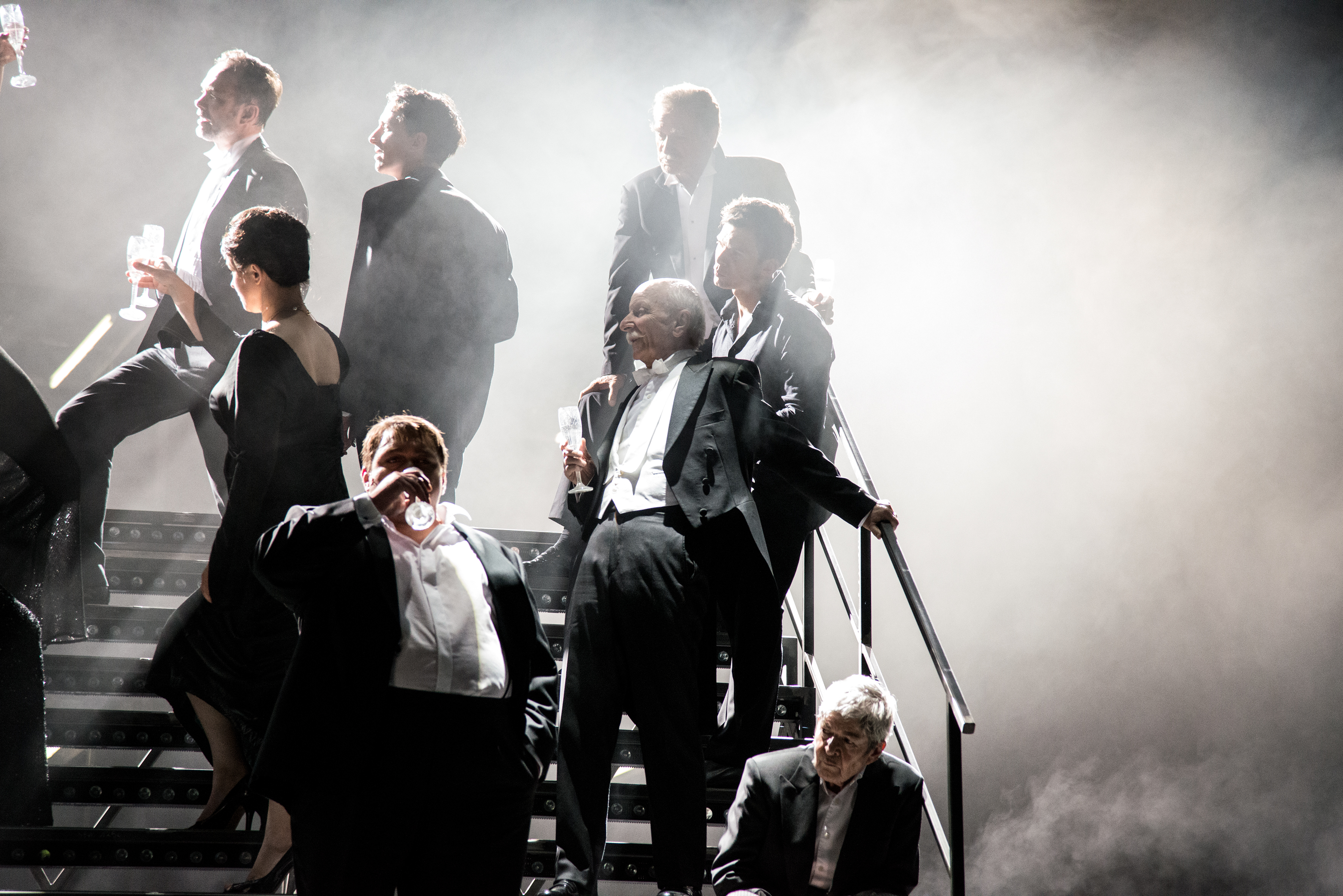
The Last Days of Mankind at Salzburg Festival, 2014

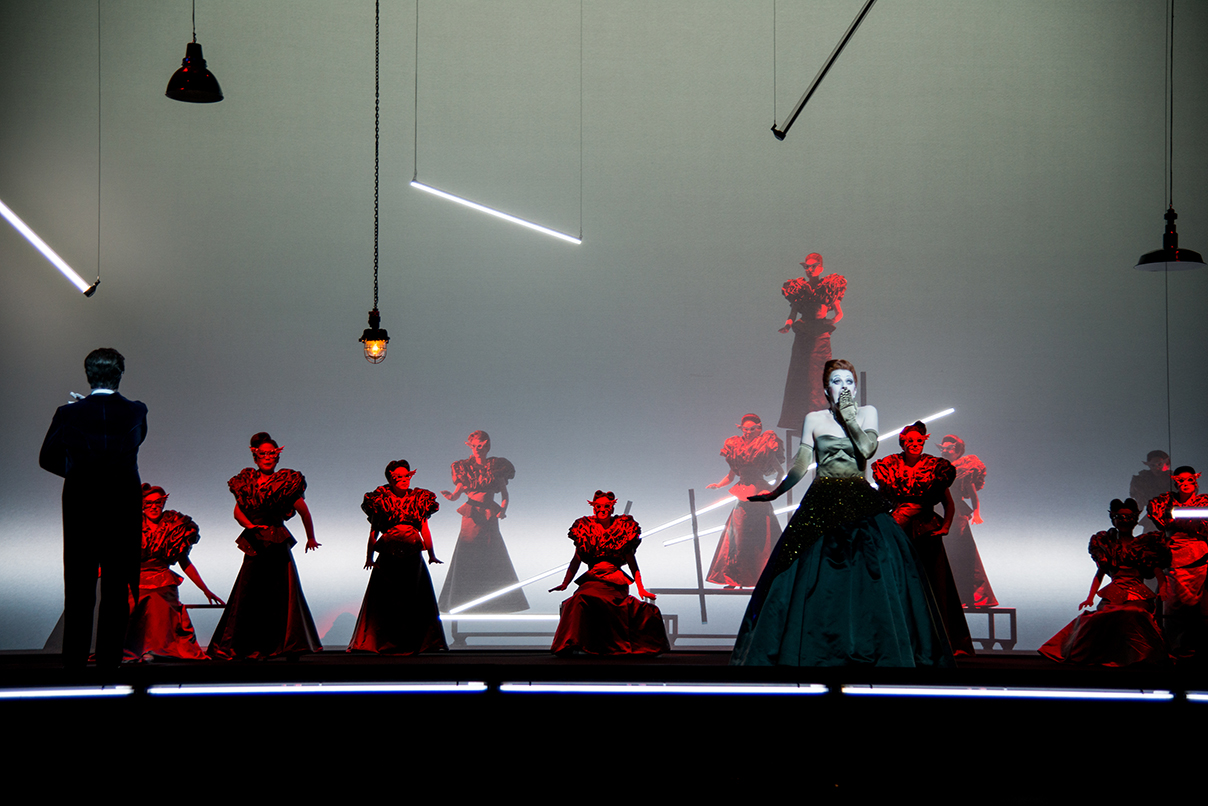
La traviata, directed by Robert Wilson, Linz 2015

Theatre photography first took place in the photographer's studio before the photographer could come to the theatre with the appropriate technical equipment and take pictures on stage. Theatre photography is a genre of photography. Its motifs are performers on theatre stages as well as scenery or (rarely) prop or stage design. Trends in theatre photography are drama and comedy, opera, ballet, puppetry, cabaret, variety show and portraits of artists.

== History ==
Paul Kuritz writes: ″Romanticism found its truest expression in opera. Realism found its natural form in photography, and, later, in its extension, motion pictures.″ In an interview with Maria Baranova, producer Ivan Talijancic stated that live performances are extremely ephemeral: "So it’s a tremendous challenge to capture the experience of this living, breathing, three-dimensional art form in a two-dimensional frozen moment. It takes a special eye and skill to get that."

== Genre ==
Theatre photography serves as documentation and advertising for a theatre. Documentation includes the capturing of an artistic expression, the presentation, the realization of the theme and also the stage design. Recordings of theatre scenes and performers are used in showcases, for theatre posters, programme booklets and advertisements. The most extensive use of theatre photos is in the media, mainly to announce new productions or to illustrate reviews.

Professional theatre photographers are usually self-employed and are booked for the respective production, although contracts for the entire theatre season are quite common. Some large theatres have their own advertising department, in which permanently committed photographers also work.

== Practice ==
The use of digital single-lens reflex camera and fast objectives with different focal length — depending on the size of the stage — enables the theater photographer to react to the most diverse light moods on stage. The use of a flash is usually prohibited during stage performances; it is also in most cases not appropriate as it ″flattens″ everything with its white light. Many theatre photographers also shoot in raw image format to compensate for colour cast and deviating colour temperature in the digital workflow. In addition, digital photography allows a quick and timely publication of the photos in mass media.

Photographs are mainly taken only during rehearsals so that the performance is not affected. There are often extra "photo and TV rehearsals" before the premiere, to which press photographers are invited. Photo and TV rehearsals, for example, are the standard in all theatres and opera houses in Berlin and Hamburg, Salzburg and Vienna.

== Notable theatre photographers ==
=== 19th century ===
- Alfred Ellis (1854–1930)
- Nadar (1820–1910)
- Napoleon Sarony (1821–1896)
- Otto Sarony (1850–1903)

=== 1900–1945 ===
- James Abbe (1883–1973)
- Alice Boughton (1866–1943)
- Joseph Byron (1847–1923)
- Rosemarie Clausen (1907–1990)
- Hugo Erfurth (1874–1948)
- Ludwig Gutmann (1869–1943)
- Elli Marcus (1899–1977)

- Gjon Mili (1904–1984)
- Herman Mishkin (1870–1948)
- Ursula Richter (1886–1946)
- Alfredo Valente (1899–1973)
- Florence Vandamm (1883–1966)
- Ruth Wilhelmi (1904–1977)

=== 1945–2000 ===
- Gordon Anthony (1902–1989)
- Andreas Birkigt (b. 1949)
- Fergus Bourke (1934–2004)
- Věra Caltová (1923–2009)
- Rosemarie Clausen (1907–1990)
- Zoë Dominic (1920–2011)
- Siegfried Enkelmann (1905–1978)
- Hainer Hill (1913–2001)
- Pedro Kramreiter (born 1939)
- Ivan Kyncl (1953–2004)
- Siegfried Lauterwasser (1913–2000)
- Elli Marcus (1899–1977)

- Gjon Mili (1904–1984)
- Jack Mitchell (1925–2013)
- Lewis Morley (1925–2013)
- Stefan Moses (1928–2018)
- Fritz Peyer (1919–2001)
- Barbara Pflaum (1912–2002)
- Erio Piccagliani (1917–2002)
- Avraham Pisarek (1901–1983)
- Liselotte Strelow (1908–1981)
- Abisag Tüllmann (1935–1996)
- Ruth Wilhelmi (1904–1977)

=== 21st century ===
- Maria Baranova (b. 1979) New York City
- Andreas Birkigt (b. 1949) Leipzig
- Luigi Caputo Salzburg
- Marc J. Franklin New York City
- Željko Jovanović (b. 1961) Belgrade

- Joan Marcus New York City
- Reza Moatarian (b. 1969) Iran
