= Marcello Norberth =

Italian photographer (1937–2024)

- Born: 16 January 1937; San Ginesio, Italy
- Died: 5 March 2024 (aged 87); Rome, Italy
- Occupation: Photographer

Marcello Norberth (16 January 1937 – 5 March 2024) was an Italian photographer.

== Biography ==
Born in San Ginesio, Marche, Norberth graduated from the Accademia di Belle Arti in Florence and then moved to Rome, where he started his activity as a professional photographer, also collaborating with Vogue. In the 1970s he specialized as a stage photographer, collaborating among others with Eduardo De Filippo, Nikita Mikhalkov, Peter Stein, Alvis Hermanis, Luigi Squarzina, Maurizio Scaparro, Orazio Costa, Mario Missiroli, Massimo Castri, Giancarlo Cobelli, Luca De Filippo.

Norberth is best known for his association with Luca Ronconi, for whom he served as a photographer on nearly all of his theatrical works. Ronconi described him as 'the only one who had been able to capture the essence of his work'. He died in Rome on 5 March 2024, at the age of 87.
