= Fritz Peyer =

German photographer (1919–2001)

Fritz Peyer (1919 – December 2001) was a German theatre photographer and photojournalist specialising in opera, ballet and equestrian sport.

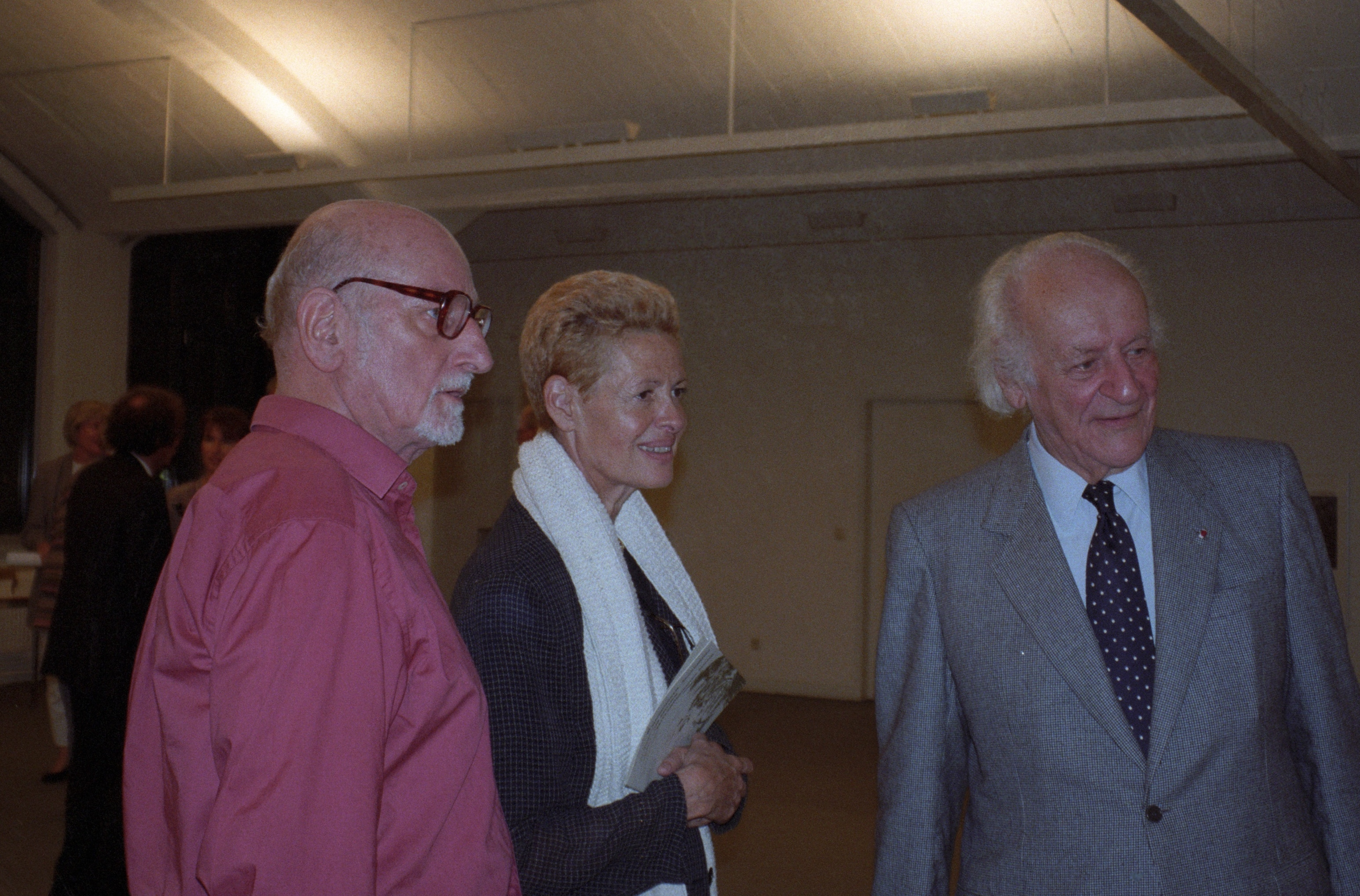
State Opera Director Rolf Liebermann at a photo exhibition by Fritz Peyer (left)

== Life ==
Born in Munich, Peyer began training as a technician, but was drafted into the military before he could finish. After the Second World War, he came to the theatre by chance, where he initially helped out at the Hamburger Kammerspieles as a lighting and stagehand. Rosemarie Clausen, who worked there as a theatre photographer, recognised his talent as a photographer. Peyer had acquired the necessary knowledge autodidacticly. He first worked for her as a volunteer, then as an assistant, and was able to accompany all productions at the Hamburg Kammerspiele as an independent photographer as early as 1952 to 1955.

Later, the artistic director Günther Rennert brought him to the Hamburg State Opera, where he introduced personalities such as Marlene Dietrich, the young Juliette Gréco or the choreographer George Balanchine in his unmistakable way.

But he did not only photograph at the theatre. He also took his camera to horse races, tennis matches, fashion shows and anti-nuclear demonstrations. This has resulted in several illustrated books that are out of print today [2009]. In 1963, he won first prize in the World Press Photo competition as a sports photographer, and in 1996 the city of Hamburg awarded him the Alexander Zinn Prize for Journalists.

His objectivising, completely unadulterated style, which nevertheless focused on scenic, moving highlights, and his rejection of dramatic staging earned him a reputation and attention, not least his graffiti documentaries.

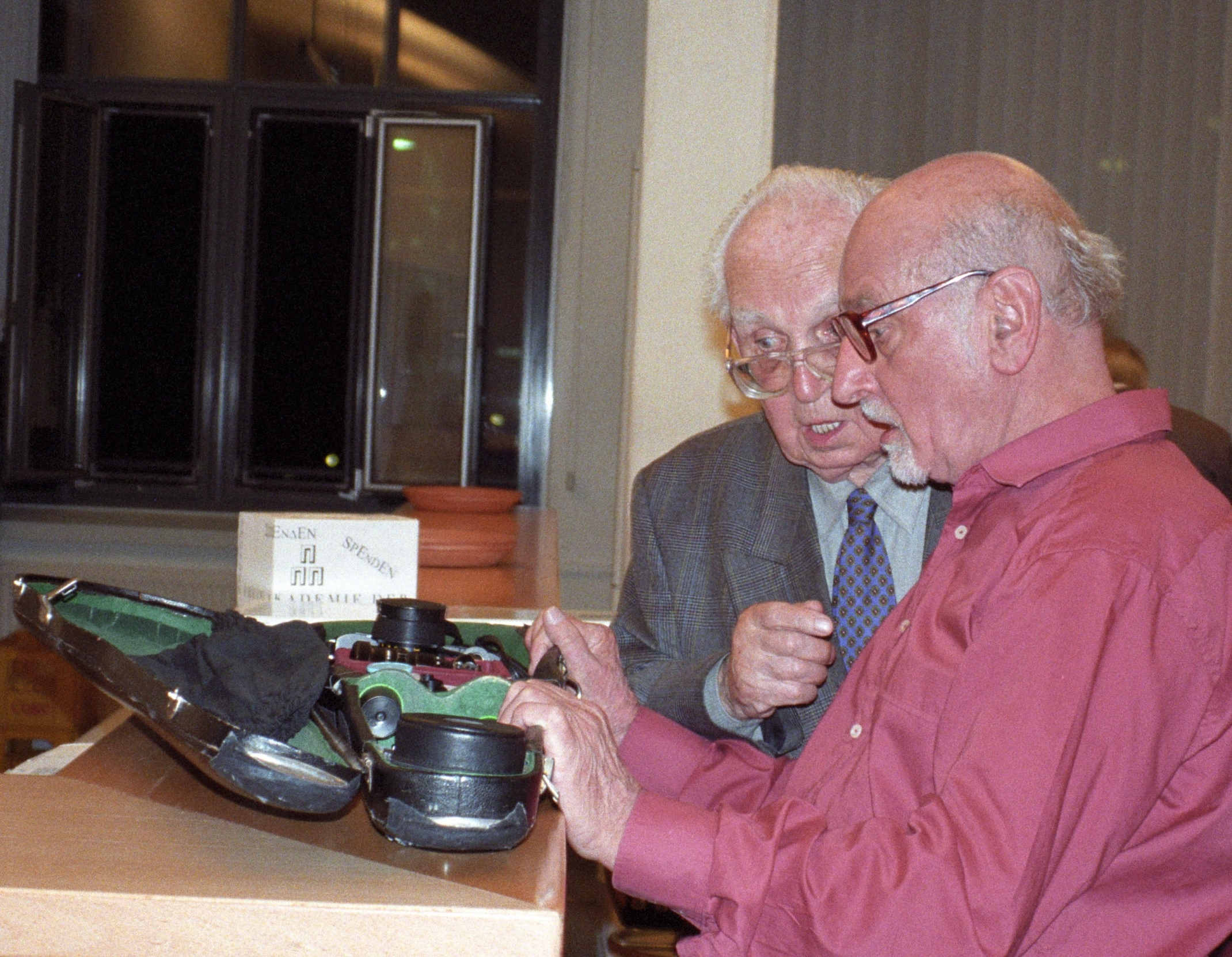
Peyer explains his converted violin case to a colleague

His trademark was a converted old violin case in which he transported his photographic equipment. The first time he used it for camouflage was when he secretly photographed Marlene Dietrich at rehearsals, as she had strictly forbidden him to take pictures.

Large parts of his artistic estate are in the Deutsches Theatermuseum in Munich. His horse pictures are archived in the Deutsches Pferdemuseum in Verden an der Aller. Around seven hundred photos, furthermore negatives and contacts from the field of ballet can be found in the Deutsches Tanzarchiv Köln.

He was married to the photographer Traute Peyer (1924-2018).

The photographer should not take himself so important that he stages something else into his photographs. The task of photography is to reproduce a situation unaltered.

— Fritz Peyer

Peyer died in Hamburg.

== Exhibitions ==
- 1991: Narrenhände...? Graffiti, Altonaer Museum in Hamburg (20 February to 5 May 1991)
- 2002: Fritz Peyer. Photographien, State Museum for Art and Cultural History in Oldenburg (26 May - 28 July 2002)
- 2003: Fritz Peyer. Photographien, Altonaer Museum in Hamburg (12 March to 18 May 2003)

== Work ==
- Hans Joachim Köhler: Von der Koppel bis zum Sieg, Fotos von Fritz Peyer. Bildband. Kornett-Verlag, Verden (Aller) ca. 1955.
- Hans-Joachim Köhler: Berühmte Reiter von Angesicht zu Angesicht, Farbfotos: Fritz Peyer u. Werner Menzendorf. Kornett Verlag, Verden (Aller) 1959.
- Torkild Hinrichsen: Narrenhände...?. Graffiti. Fotografien von Fritz Peyer. Bildband zur Ausstellung. Altonaer Museum, Hamburg (1991) ISBN 3-927637-09-2.
- Bernd Küster: Fritz Peyer. Photographien. Bildband zur Ausstellung mit 101 Abbildungen. Donat Verlag, Bremen (2002) ISBN 3-934836-41-0.
