= Helmut-Ulrich Weiss =

German filmmaker and educator (born 1948)

- Born: 2 July 1948 (age 78); Konstanz, Germany
- Education: Lette-Verein; Deutsche Film- und Fernsehakademie Berlin
- Occupations: Filmmaker; educator
- Years active: 1973–present
- Spouse: Beate Honsell-Weiss

Helmut-Ulrich Weiss (born July 2, 1948) is a German filmmaker and educator.

== Early life and formative years ==
Helmut-Ulrich Weiss grew up in Konstanz, where he attended a French kindergarten from the age of four, later a French school, and finally the Alexander-von-Humboldt-Gymnasium, Konstanz. In 1963 he spent a year at Princeton High School (New Jersey). Weiss graduated from the Hörnlibergschule in Kreuzlingen (Switzerland) in 1967, while also studying at the Konservatorium Winterthur (Switzerland).

As a non-recognized conscientious objector, Weiss worked as a paramedic for the German Air Force near Munich. He then trained as a photographer at the Lette-Verein in Berlin, where he met his future wife Beate Honsell. Starting in 1973, the couple traveled for several months each year through the Near, Middle, and Far East in a Citroën 2CV, producing photo-essayistic works under the name Honsell-Weiss for agencies, newspapers, and magazines such as Fotomagazin. Works by Helmut-Ulrich Weiss have been exhibited and received awards.

From the late 1970s onwards, Weiss was involved in cultural and educational projects at Berlin schools and at the Wannseeforum. At the Pädagogisches Zentrum (PZ) he joined a project group in 1976 that developed situation-oriented learning concepts for preschool children. Weiss also contributed to the documentation of a five-year model project on artist training conducted from 1976 to 1981 by the University of the Arts Berlin and the German Artists’ Association. In the International Year of Disabled Persons 1981, Weiss and the painter Paula Schmidt worked with Berlin elementary and special school students to develop a creative approach to the otherwise abstract world of letters and symbols. In 1982, Helmut Weiss and Beate Honsell-Weiss, together with Ben Wagin’s Baumpaten e.V., organized the participatory exhibition Rausch der Bäume – Sucht der Träume, wer denkt um – wer macht mit? at the Fabrik Osloer Straße in Berlin. Conceived as an experimental approach to addiction prevention, it invited visitors to “recognize their own addictive behaviors in relation to the destructive mechanisms of their environment and culture.”

== Filmmaker and film educator ==
In 1981, Weiss passed the entrance examination to the German Film and Television Academy Berlin (DFFB) with the rough cut of his documentary Étude de Pluie (lit. "Rain Study"). The film, the first part of a long-term observation of two blind brothers in a mountain village in the Hérault region, was screened internationally and broadcast by SFB, RB, and NDR. In 1984, the collective film Mikado from Elfi Mikesch's seminar premiered at the Berlinale Forum. The following year, Weiss presented two of his own films, Bücher im Nacken (lit. "Books on your Back") and Die Vereinigten Staaten von Erinnerung (lit. "The United States of Memory"), also in the Forum program. His short film Sensation (after the poem by Arthur Rimbaud) made the longlist for the 1986 Student Academy Awards.

In 1983, Weiss became student representative at the DFFB and contributed to curriculum reform. Together with fellow student Wilma Pradetto, he made Esplanade, about the historic Hotel Esplanade in Berlin. This led to the commissioned production Über den Dächern (lit. "Above the rooftops") for SFB. A scholarship from the Airlift Memorial Fund in 1984/85 enabled him to study in the Haut-Languedoc and in Toulouse. From 1986, he worked at the DFFB as a specialist advisor for camera, editing, and sound, and from 1988 to 2000 as lecturer and instructor.

In 1987, the Goethe-Institut invited Weiss to a retrospective in Toulouse. Since 1989, he regularly gave guest seminars at the Toulousian film school ESAV, where from 1991 to 2016 he led his own master class for independent and experimental filmmaking. Since 1991, the couple has divided their time between France and Berlin. Since 2000, they have resided permanently in Bouillac (Tarn-et-Garonne).

Weiss expressed his philosophy of teaching in a DFFB anniversary publication, thanking his own teachers “who know how to treat education itself as an ART.” His playful, undogmatic approach to filmmaking is reflected in a text for Les Cahiers du Scénario, where he describes the creation of a film: “I film children’s eyes and edit them endlessly one after another: German, Italian, French, American, Puerto Rican eyes. The impression arises that this gives importance to the theme.” His disregard for genre conventions, his repeated re-editing and reinterpretation of his own films, and his focus on teaching all demonstrate Weiss's delight in the process of making films rather than in the finished works. He often questioned the need for new films: “For a week I have not filmed or recorded a single sound. The subject slipped away from me, and I rediscovered how beautiful it is simply to live. The world is overcrowded with images and sounds, and I would love to withdraw from all this art fabrication.”

Alongside his teaching, Weiss continued to make occasional films, including Traction Avant, une histoire d'amour (lit. "Traction Avant, a love story") in 1997 and his very intimate portrait about his father, Ich habe eigentlich immer Glück gehabt – Eine Reise ins Alzheimerland (lit. "I’ve Always Been Lucky – A Journey into Alzheimer’s Land") in 2010.

== Filmography ==
- 1982: Palmsonntag
- 1983: Étude de Pluie
- 1984: Mikado
- 1984: Bücher im Nacken
- 1984: Bardou – Ein Leben wie Gott in Frankreich
- 1984: Kauf-Haus-Traum
- 1985: Die Vereinigten Staaten von Erinnerung
- 1985: Esplanade
- 1985: Sensation
- 1987: Über den Dächern (Part 2 of Berlin – Gesichter einer Großstadt)
- 1987: Tag für Nacht
- 1989: Fallen
- 1997: La Traction Avant, une histoire d'amour
- 2001: Rhapsodie de nuit
- 2009: L'aventure du Trésor de Saissac
- 2010: Ich habe eigentlich immer Glück gehabt – Eine Reise ins Alzheimerland
