= Kriminal-Magazin =

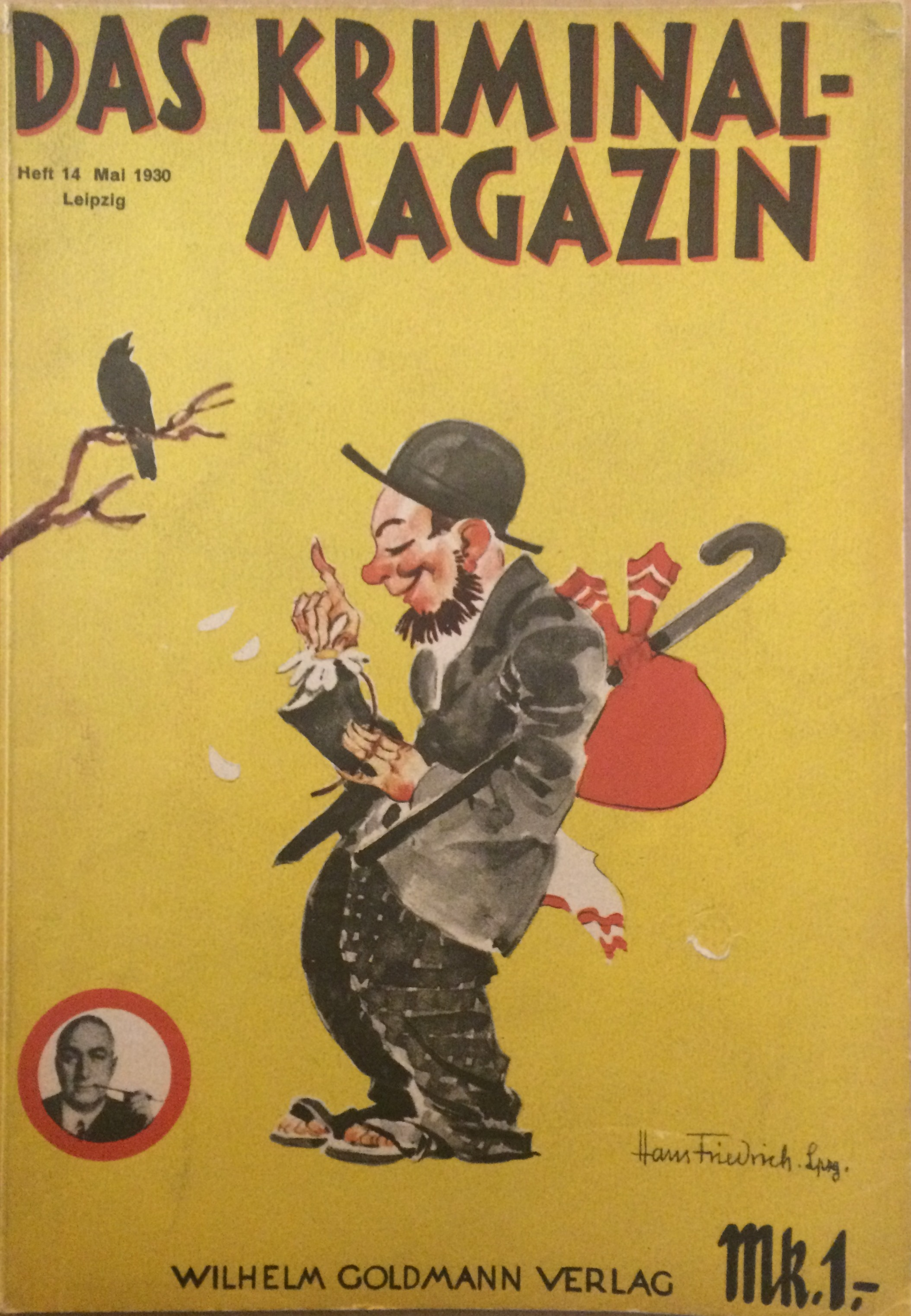
Kriminal-Magazin No. 14, 1930

The Kriminal-Magazin (Crime Magazine) was a German entertainment magazine that published crime fiction every month during 1929–1931. The magazine was distributed by the Leipzig publishing house Wilhelm Goldmann, selling about 100,000 copies per issue. The publisher was the English writer Edgar Wallace, whose photo was seen on each cover on the bottom left. The magazine included about 100 pages and was relatively cheap, mainly because it was financed largely through advertising.

In addition to stories from well-known writers of the Weimar Republic (for example Otto Eis, Alma Karlin or Jo Hanns Rösler) it also published analysis and reports from various authors on the subject of criminology. The magazine was published with black and white photos, drawings and cartoons by renowned artists such as Elli Marcus or Hans Friedrich, in which arty individual photos were printed on stronger cardboard.

Although the magazine was discontinued at the end of 1931, there were some new editions in the years 1935 and 1936, but the magazine was set up in a much more simple way, consisting largely of short and serial stories.
