= Andreas Birkigt =

German photographer

Andreas Birkigt (born July 1949 in Leipzig) is a German theater photographer and non fiction writer.

== Career ==
After working as a photo salesman and extra at the Oper Leipzig, Birkigt began his career as a stage photographer as photo assistant to Helga Wallmüller. Since 1990, he has been head of the photo department there. He photographed more than 200 new productions and created the portrait photos of all artists. He also photographed all opera balls as well as several concerts and events. As co-author he contributed the photos for several non-fiction books.

== Works ==
- with Lothar Wittke: Leipziger Ballett : 10 Jahre Uwe Scholz. OCLC 48267866
- John Dew inszeniert Mozart : Die Hochzeit des Figaro, Così fan tutte, Don Giovanni, edited by Fritz Hennenberg
- Andreas Birkigt, Udo Zimmermann, Das Opernhaus, Verlag Kunst und Touristik, 1991
- Helga Wallmüller, Andreas Birkigt, Leipziger Theater: 35. Jahrestag der Gründung der Deutschen Demokratischen Republik 1984, Leipziger Theater, 1984
- Andreas Birkigt, Jürgen Tiede, Anschrift: Bautzner Straße Leipzig: Wege zum Ballett, Ed. Tiede, 1998
- Roman Brüschweiler, Karl Meier, Andreas Birkigt, Willkommen in Wettingen: Informationsbroschüre für Wettinger Wissbegierige, Gemeinde Wettingen, 1999
- 150 Jahre Operette in Leipzig, by Leonard Czernetzky/Doris Fischer – with 64 photos by Andreas Birkigt 2009
- Geschichte der Oper Leipzig by Fritz Hennenberg – with 28 photos by Andreas Birkigt 2009
- Oper Leipzig, Schlaglichter auf fünf Jahrzehnte Musiktheater – with 181 photos by Andreas Birkigt – edited by Alexander von Maravic/Harald Müller TdZ 2010
- Zeitsprünge – Leaps in Time – Uwe Scholz – with 46 photos by Andreas Birkigt – edited by Nadja Kadel, Kati Burchart 2013
