= Ruth Wilhelmi =

German woman photographer

Ruth Wilhelmi-König (1904 – 1977) was a German woman stage photographer.

== Life ==
Born in Berlin, Wilhelmi was born as the daughter of a journalist. After an apprenticeship with a Berlin photographer, Wilhelmi founded her own studio in 1926, first with a focus on portrait and fashion photography, and since the early 1930s also with theatre photography. She mainly worked in Berlin, where she documented several Bert Brecht productions. One of her students was Margrit Schmidt. In 1937, she passed the examination for the master craftsman's diploma and afterwards became in-house photographer of the Staatliche Bühnen. In 1943, her studio was destroyed during an air raid. After 1945, she worked again as a theatre photographer until 1972.

After her death in Berlin, the Deutsches Theatermuseum in Munich acquired her archive in 1981. Parts of her work can also be found in the archive of the Academy of Arts, Berlin.

She was married to the Berlin Senator for Economics Karl König.

== Book participations ==
- Annedore Leber: Das Gewissen entscheidet Bereiche d. dt. Widerstandes von 1933 - 1945 in Lebensbildern, Fotographische Mitarbeit: Ruth Wilhelmi
- Theater in Berlin 1951-1961. Zehn Jahre Schiller Theater, Schloßpark-Theater, Schiller-Theater Werkstatt. Mit 252 Abbildungen. (photos Ruth Wilhelmi and al.)
- Georg Zivier: Ernst Deutsch und das deutsche Theater, Haude & Spenersche Vlgsbuchhdlg. 1964 (Mit 99 Abb. nach Aufnahmen Ruth Wilhelmi among others)
- Alfred Mühr: Großes Theater, Begegnungen mit Gustaf Gründgens, Oswald Arnold Verlag, Berlin 1950 (Aufnahmen among others Ruth Wilhelmi)
- Richard Biedrzynski: Schauspieler – Regisseure – Intendanten (among 27 portraits and scene photos by Ruth Wilhelmi)
- Bertolt Brecht: Couragemodell 1949. Mutter Courage und ihre Kinder, Henschel (1958), with pictures by Ruth Berlau, Hainer Hill and Ruth Wilhelmi
