= Anna Schepeler-Lette =

Anna Schelpeler-Lette
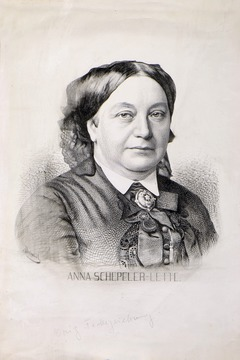
- Anna Schepeler-Lette
- Born: Anna Lette; 19 December 1829; Soldin, Kingdom of Prussia
- Died: 17 September 1897 (aged 67); Berlin, German Empire
- Occupations: Feminist, women's social reformer, pedagogue
- Father: Wilhelm Adolf Lette

Anna Schepeler-Lette (née Anna Lette; December 19, 1827 – September 17, 1897) was a German feminist, women's social reformer, and pedagogue. She founded schools that had no precedent at the time. She was the first director of Lette-Verein (Lette Society), a German educational institution for girls.

== Biography ==
"If we are asked whether we would have women enter public life, whether we would wish them to become professors in the university, clergymen in the church, and lawyers at the bar, as is the case in America, we should make no response, Tor they are but idle questions. These demands have not yet been made in Germany, nor will they be made for a long time to come, if ever. But why peer into the future? We have today many institutions, many customs, which past centuries would have looked upon as contrary to Divine and human law. In this connection we would say with Sancho Panza: 'What is, is able to be.'" (Anna Schepeler-Lette, 1886)

Schepeler-Lette was born December 19, 1827, at Soldin, Germany (now Poland). She was the eldest daughter of Dr. Wilhelm Adolf Lette whom she accompanied, in 1848, to Frankfurt am Main, where he went as a member of the German National Parliament. In 1866, she joined her father in Berlin, and was initiated into the work of the Lette Society, to which she devoted all her time and energy. A reformer, Schepeler-Lette went to America in 1876, and visited the Centennial Exposition, and many of the principal cities of the US, where she carefully examined various institutions whose aims were similar to those of the Lette Society.

In 1872, Schepeler-Lette established the "Association to promote the employment of the female sex" in Berlin, later renamed Lette-Verein. Under her leadership, the association became a global model for women's vocational training. She founded schools that had no precedent at the time, nor was there a guarantee that government or industry would find the education provided as being acceptable. Under her leadership, the trade and vocational school was established in 1872, telegraph training in 1873, typesetting in 1875, and photography in 1890. Schepeler-Lette is also remembered for recognizing the need to train and retrain instructors.

== Death and legacy ==
After her death in Berlin, September 17, 1897, the artist Alexander Tondeur created a bust in her honor.

== Selected works ==
- "Bericht über den Verband deutscher Frauenbildungs- und Erwerbvereine erstattet auf der Generalversammlung des Allgemeinen Deutschen Frauenvereins zu Heidelberg." In Frauenanwalt. Berlin, 1879, pp. 340–345 (in German)
- "Die Spitzenfabrikation des Riesengebirges." In Deutscher Frauenanwalt. Berlin, 1881, pp. 1–4 (in German)
