= Lette-Verein =

Group of vocational schools for girls in Berlin, Germany, founded in 1866

Coordinates: 52.495985°N 13.341156°E

Lette-Verein (Lette Association or Lette Society) is a German educational organization for applied arts. Founded in 1866 in Berlin, the idea of Dr. Wilhelm Adolf Lette, it was initially a technical school for girls. Its motto was "Dienen lerne bei Zeiten das Weib nach seiner Bestimmung" (A woman should learn to serve according to her purpose as quickly as possible). In 1872, Lette's daughter, Anna Schepeler-Lette, became the first director of the society. Its early form has been compared to that of the London Society for Promoting the Employment of Women. Lette-Verein is located at Viktoria-Luise-Platz 6, 10777 Berlin, Germany.

== History ==
Founded as a technical school, Lette-Verein was organized to suit the special social conditions of its time. It was agreed to aim at adapting itself to existing institutions, rather than creating a school for more highly educated future generations. It received the support of influential members of German society, beginning with the Emperor and Empress. From the first it owed much to the substantial aid and personal interest tendered by the Crown Princess.

The Lette-Verein was designed as a handful of societies, all closely knit together, located in the same premises, and with the same main object, namely, the promotion of women's education, the improvement of the working capacities of those who are self-dependent. Besides the trade school, there was the Victoria Stift, a foundation offering a temporary home to ladies of limited means; a bazaar for the sale of work; a registry for women in search of employment; a loan society; a lending library, and a school for servants, factory girls, and others seeking self-improvement. The school – open to girls 15 years and older – was designed to only provide a technical, not a general, education.

== Schools ==
For admission to the School of Commerce division, girls must be able to prove that they have previously had a good general education. Here they receive special training that will thoroughly qualify them for situations in mercantile houses. In its early years, he pupils' fees were 77. 10s. a year, the classes were in the morning, and occupied 20–23 hours a week. The principal subjects were: mercantile handwriting, mercantile arithmetic, office work, and commercial correspondence, bookkeeping, commerce by bills of exchange, French and English, German, geography. In general, on leaving the Lette-Verein, the girls obtained employment as clerks, cashiers, and correspondents.

The drawing school had two divisions: one of these was expressly for the training of drawing mistresses for similar schools in the country, the other gave art instruction with special reference to certain branches of industry. The fees ere 30s. a quarter in the late 19th century. The studies included linear and freehand drawing, geometry, colouring, ornamental design, flower-painting, china-painting, and modelling.

The industrial division of the school was the largest. In the late 19th century, classes were attended by over 800 students. There were classes for dressmaking, machine-sewing, the cutting-out of linen, the manufacture of artificial flowers, glove-making, millinery, and hair-dressing. The monthly fees for instruction varied from 12 to 15 shillings. Many of the pupils trained here were afterwards engaged as teachers in industrial schools in the country.

At the Lette-Verein cooking school, the pupils cooked for a restaurant for ladies attached to the building.

The school for compositors was housed in a different building. It was an offshoot of the Lette-Verein, and under the management of the society. Candidates for admission had to be at least 16 years of age, must have received a good education, and must have had sufficient means of support for the first six months, during which they earned nothing. After that time, they were paid according to the normal German tariff. The school was in connection with a Berlin printing company, for which it worked regularly. The best students earned 20-30 shillings a week. The pupils were divided into three classes; those in the upper division were drafted off in turn into other printing offices. In 1877, there were 30 pupils in the printing school, daughters of landed proprietors, clergymen, doctors, schoolmasters, and government officials.

== Notable teachers and students ==
- Elise Hannemann (1849–1934)
- Mathilde Block (1850–1932)
- Karl Hoffacker (1856–1919), Drawing school direction (1884–1889)
- Dankmar Schultz-Hencke (1857–1913)
- Margarethe Raabe (1863–1947)
- Nicola Perscheid (1864–1930)
- Johanna Beckmann (1868–1941)
- Marie Kundt (1870–1932)
- Alice Salomon (1872–1948)
- Käthe Buchler (1876–1930)
- Magda Trott (1880–1945)
- Elly Heuss-Knapp (1881–1952)
- Anna Köppen (1881–1965)
- Dora Lux (1882–1959)
- Erna Lendvai-Dircksen (1883–1962)
- Karl Schenker (1886-1954)
- Elsbeth Schragmüller (1887–1940)
- Frieda Riess (1890–1954)
- Lotte Wernekink (1897–1976)
- Lily Pincus (1898–1981)
- Charlotte Rohrbach (1902–1981)
- Anneliese Hager (1904–1997)
- Rosemarie Clausen (1907–1990)
- Liselotte Strelow (1908–1981)
- Marianne Breslauer (1909–2001)
- Eva Kemlein (1909–2004)
- Gerd Hartung (1913–2003)
- Unica Zürn (1916–1970)
- Ilse Dubois (1922–2008)
- Ruth Underberg (1924–2002)
- Michael Otto (artist) (born 1938)
- Roger Melis (1940–2009)
- Rotraud von der Heide (born 1942)
- Helmut-Ulrich Weiss (born 1947)
- Reinhard Matz (born 1952)
- Olaf Jeglitza (born 1965)
- Benjamin Ochse (born 1965)
- Ralph Mecke (born 1966)
- Lorenz Kienzle (born 1967)
- Olaf Heine (born 1968)
- Martin Schoeller (born 1968)

== Bibliography ==
- Albisetti, James C. (14 July 2014). Schooling German Girls and Women. Princeton University Press. ISBN 978-1-4008-5979-5.
- Clarke, Isaac Edwards (1892). Art and Industry: (1892) Industrial and manual training in the public schools (Public domain ed.). U.S. Government Printing Office.
- Gary, Cauleen Suzanne (2008). Bildung and Gender in Nineteenth-century Bourgeois Germany: A Cultural Studies Analysis of Texts by Women Writers. ISBN 978-0-549-77770-0.
- Hauff, Lilly: Der Lette-Verein in der Geschichte der Frauenbewegung. - Berlin 1928 (in German)
- Hirsch, Jenny: Geschichte der fünfundzwanzigjährigen Wirksamkeit (1866 bis 1891) des unter dem Protektorat Ihrer Majestät der Kaiserin und Königin Friedrich stehenden Lette-Vereins zur Förderung höherer Bildung und Erwerbsfähigkeit des weiblichen Geschlechts. - Berlin 1891 (in German)
- Obschernitzki, Doris: Der Frau ihre Arbeit! Lette-Verein: zur Geschichte einer Berliner Institution 1866–1986. Berlin 1987, ISBN 3-926175-06-0. (in German)
- Stanton, Theodore (30 April 2015). The Woman Question in Europe. Cambridge University Press. ISBN 978-1-108-08468-0.
