= Rosemarie Clausen =

German photographer (1907–1990)

Rosemarie Clausen (née Rose Marie Margarethe Elisabeth Kögel); (5 March 1907 – 9 January 1990) was a German photographer. She worked as theatre and portrait photographer and received several awards for her work.

== Life ==
Born in Großziethen near Berlin, Clausen was a granddaughter of the Oberhof and Domprediger Rudolf Kögel and daughter of the pastor and school councillor Rudolf Kögel and his wife Sabine, née Gehring. In 1934, she married the journalist and film producer Jürgen Clausen (1905–1944), who was killed as a pilot of a night fighter during the "Big Week".

Clausen, who originally wanted to become a portrait painter, completed a photographer apprenticeship with Marie Böhm, the head of the renowned studio Becker & Maass, and after three years passed the assistant examination with distinction at the Lette-Verein in Berlin. Afterwards, she worked from 1929 until autumn 1933 as assistant to the theatre photographer Elli Marcus and after her emigration with her own studio in Berlin-Schmargendorf, at many Berlin theatres, among others the Preußisches Staatstheater Berlin under Gustaf Gründgens, until its general closure due to the war. Numerous photographic portraits were taken, among others of Kurt Hirschfeld.

According to art historian Gabriele Lohmann, Clausen was one of those photographers during the National Socialist era who had nothing to fear from persecution, as she fulfilled the requirements of the Reichsministerium für Volksaufklärung und Propaganda and the Reichskulturkammer and her works were "suitable for propaganda". With their work, these photographers contributed to shaping the general self-image of the National Socialist Volksgemeinschaft as well as Women in Nazi Germany in particular. At the end of the 1930s, Clausen took numerous private photographs for the family Hermann Göring, which were distributed as picture postcards. She also illustrated journalistic propaganda reports, for example a Homestory on Göring in 1941 and in 1936 a report on the construction of the autobahn under the title Die Straßen des Führers.

In 1941, her photographs – besides those of Liselotte Orgel-Köhne and Erna Lendvai-Dircksen – were shown in an exhibition compiled by the Reichsfrauenführung under the title Frauenschaffen in Deutschland in the German-occupied Netherlands, for the first time from October 1941 in the Rijksmuseum Amsterdam, with further stations in Utrecht, Maastricht and Arnhem.

In the same year, she published photographs of death masks of "great Germans" (including Austrians such as Adalbert Stifter) under the title Die Vollendeten. "In dynamic photographs", the dead – according to the perception of art historian Isabel Richter 2010 – "looked down on the viewers in a sovereign, sublime and heroic manner". What unites them, Clausen says in the foreword to the book, is that they are all united in one, "in the one word – GERMAN" (hervorh. i. Orig.)

Some of her railway photographs were included in the 1930s editions of the Deutsches Reichsbahnkalender.

From 1945, Clausen worked in Hamburg, where she had fled with her three children after the death of her husband, at the Hamburger Kammerspiele, the Deutsches Schauspielhaus, the Thalia Theater and the Ernst Deutsch Theater and elsewhere, and also included the pantomime (Marcel Marceau). She was also important as a portrait photographer (K.R.H. Sonderborg, Jean-Louis Barrault, Samuel Beckett and others). With Wolfgang Borchert she had a close friendship in the post-war period. She made numerous portraits of the then still unknown writer. Her pictures remained formative for the Borchert picture after his death. The Wolfgang Borchert stamp of the Deutsche Bundespost shows a Clausen motif.

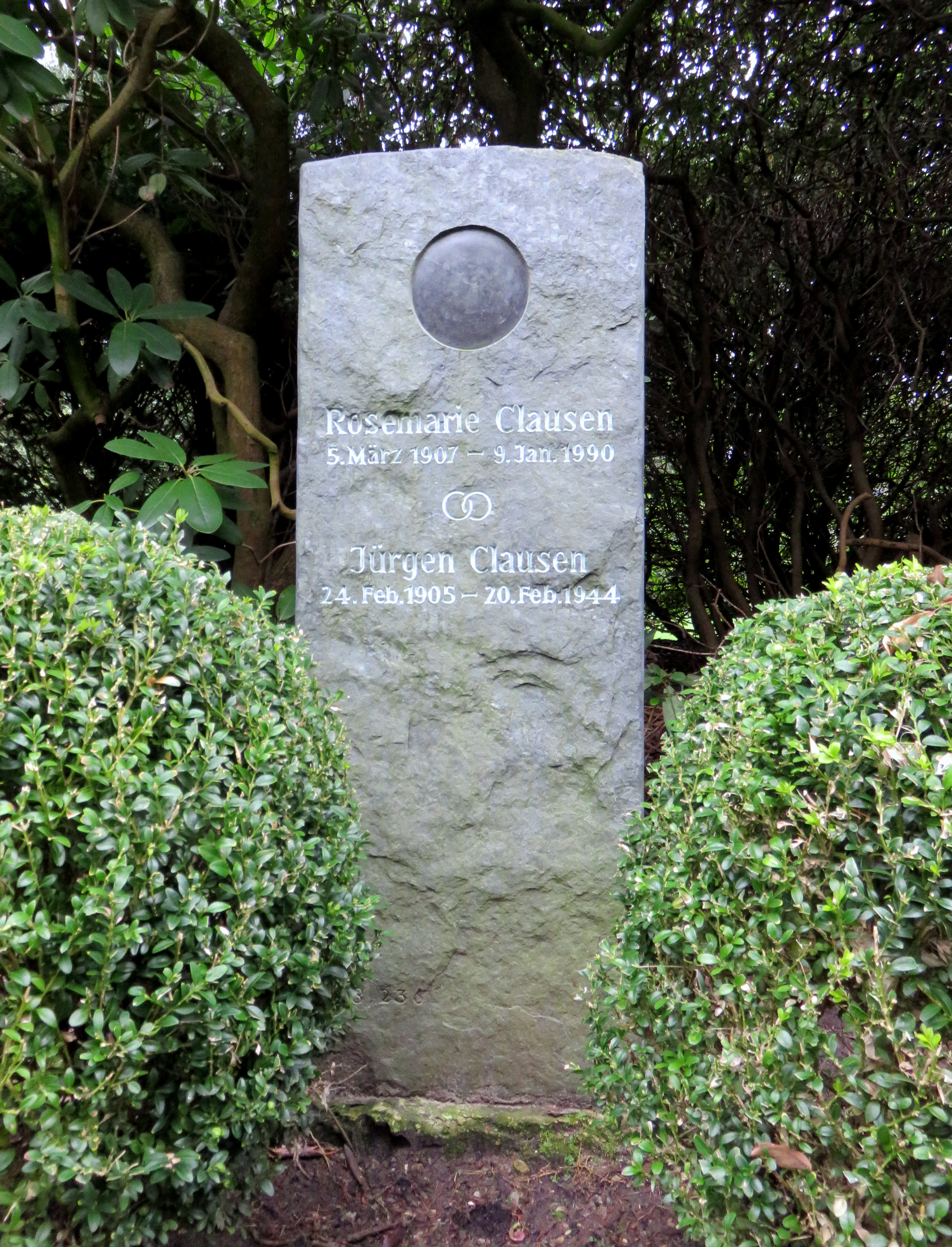
Rosemarie and Jürgen Clausen, Friedhof Ohlsdorf

She published in magazines and newspapers, as well as illustrated books and, from 1962 to 1972, theatre calendars. For many years, Clausen illustrated the annual calendar of the Theater heute magazine.

She was a member of the "Gesellschaft deutscher Lichtbildner" (GdL), the German Society for Photography (DGPh), the Freie Akademie der Künste Hamburg und Ehrenmitglied of the BFF Berufsverband Freie Fotografen und Filmgestalter.

Fritz Peyer and Ute Karen Seggelke were among her students

Her son was the sociologist Lars Clausen, her brother-in-law the actor Claus Clausen, her grandniece the actress Andrea Clausen.

Clausen died in Hamburg at the age of 82. Her grave with the grave number O8, 236 is located at the Ohlsdorf Cemetery. Her artistic estate was administered by Bettina Clausen.

== Awards ==
- 1955: Großer Preis der Internationalen Ausstellung für Bühnenphotographie Salzburg
- 1976: Kulturpreis der German Society for Photography − together with Regina Relang and Liselotte Strelow
- 1982: Biermann-Ratjen-Medaille of the Free and Hanseatic City of Hamburg.

== Legacy ==
Clausen's archive was lost in 1945 in Berlin during an air raid. However, an extensive collection of her exhibits is in the possession of the Hamburg Museum für Kunst und Gewerbe. The negative archive, which was created after the end of the Second World War, lies in the Zentrum für Theaterforschung – Hamburger Theatersammlung of the University of Hamburg and the positive archive in the Theatermuseum München and the Rosemarie Clausen – Künstlerischer Nachlass GbR in Potsdam, represented by its managing director Dr. Peer-Robin Paulus.

== Work ==
- Mensch ohne Maske, Stuttgart: Tazzelwurm 1938
- Die Vollendeten, Stuttgart: Tazzelwurm 1941 (death masks)
- Ewigkeit schwingt über ihnen Kreise, Pforzheim: Imago o.-J. [1952]
- Schrift und Maske, Hamburg: Christian Wegner 1958 (several editions)
- Theater. Gustaf Gründgens inszeniert, Hamburg: Christian Wegner 1960
- Gründgens, Velber: Friedrich 1963
- Faust in Bildern, Braunschweig: Westermann, [1960] 1964, 7th edition.
- Schauspieler (text: Siegfried Melchinger), Frankfurt: Büchergilde Gutenberg 1966
- Barlach, Hamburg: Christian Wegner ²1966
- Begegnungen, Cologne: DuMont Schauberg 1967
- Schauspiegel, Velber: Friedrich [1963] ²1968
- Samuel Beckett inszeniert, Frankfurt: Suhrkamp 1969 (several edition)
- Hamburger Thalia-Theater – Boy Gobert, Hamburg: Kristall-Verlag 1980
- Gründgens Faust. Berlin: Suhrkamp [1982] ²1983
- Rosemarie Clausen, Ingeborg Sello, Museum für Kunst und Gewerbe Hamburg 1988 (Exhibition catalogue)
