= Lorenz Kienzle =

German photographer

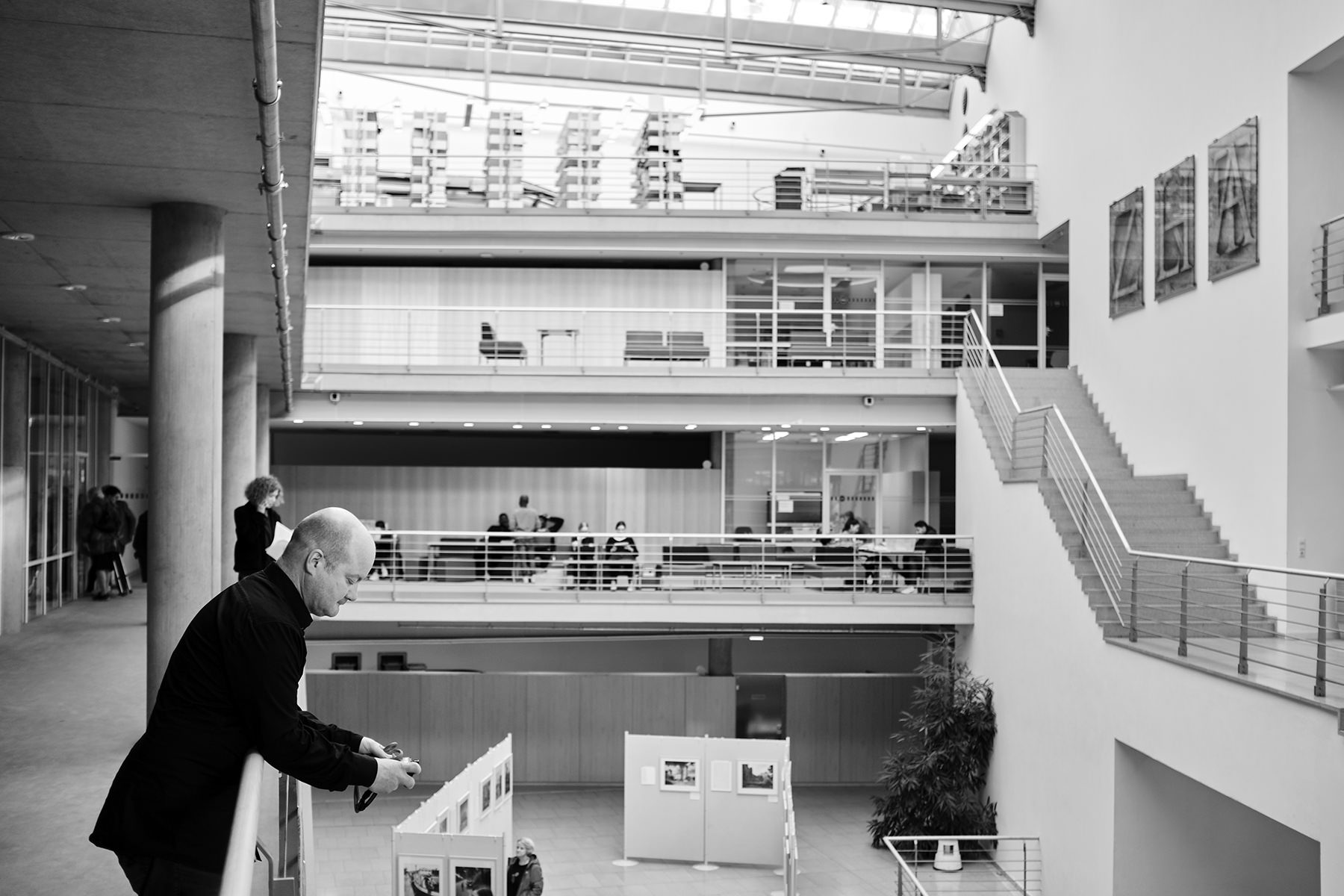
- Lorenz Kienzle (2019)
- Born: November 15, 1967 (age 58); Munich, Germany
- Education: Lette-Verein
- Occupation: Photographer
- Website: www.lorenzkienzle.com

Lorenz Kienzle (born November 15, 1967) is a German photographer. He has been living in Berlin since 1991.

== Life ==
Kienzle spent his childhood and youth in the Bavarian capital Munich. In an interview with the magazine Berliner Woche in the context of the exhibition Mein erstes gutes Foto (My first good photo) at Berlin Brotfabrik gallery in 2015 he talked about the first photo he magnified by himself while still at school in the 1980s: "In art lessons at my school, I had only spent a single hour in the darkroom. I still remember how the teacher rushed me to quickly move the photo paper from bath to bath".

After a one-year stay in Rome (1990–1991) at the Istituto Superiore di Fotografia, he trained as a photographer at the Berufsfachschule für Fotografie at Lette-Verein in Berlin (1991–1993). After graduating in 1993, he started to work as a freelance photographer, focusing on industrial heritage, architecture, urban space and portraiture. Photographic works by him were published during this time in the German daily newspapers Die Tageszeitung and Die Zeit. He works with a large format camera and B/W film.

== Work ==
In 1999 Kienzle started to work in the field of documentary photography for museums and other cultural institutions. Since 2006 he has been photographing large sculptures of the American artist Richard Serra in public spaces worldwide. In 2008, he was commissioned by Serra to photograph the exhibition Promenade at the Grand Palais in Paris for Monumenta 2008 as well as the installation piece Promenade for the exhibition catalogue and other advertising media such as posters and press photos.

In his artistic work since 2002, one focus have been the works by German novelist and poet Theodor Fontane. In the Tatort Fontane series he dealt with Fontane's novels, for which Kienzle took photographs at original locations from a contemporary perspective. The series was supplemented in 2019 with current works on a total of 11 novels, and shown in the exhibition Fontanes Berlin at Märkisches Museum. Through an exhibition project with archived photographs by Heinz Krüger, who was well known in the GDR, his focus since 2017 has also been on Fontane's Wanderungen durch die Mark Brandenburg. The results of numerous photographic excursions into the Berlin area on bicycle have been included in the book Brandenburger Notizen : Fontane - Krüger - Kienzle, published in March 2019, and an exhibition in the Museum Falkensee as part of Fontane.200, a program series funded by the annual culture festival ″Kulturland Brandenburg″. Further literary research deals with the work of Alfred Döblin. Here, too, Kienzle seeks out original locations for the novels, especially in Berlin. The first results of this research can be found in the publication of the Swedish festival O/Modernt The Art of Borrowing: Or How One Thing Leads to Another (2016).

Photographs by Lorenz Kienzle can be found in the Guggenheim Museum Bilbao, the German Museum of Technology in Berlin, the Brandenburg Museum of Industry, and in numerous private collections. In 2016 the Stadtmuseum Berlin purchased his picture series Tatort Fontane. It was shown as part of the culture festival Fontane.200 in September 2019, together with original manuscripts of Fontane novels and views of Berlin from Fontane's time in the exhibition Fontanes Berlin – Photographs & Writings. Fiction & Reality.

The Syrian filmmaker Omar Akahare followed Kienzle with a video camera during his work on the portrait series Ein Jahr Heimat (One Year Home). The short documentary portrait about Lorenz Kienzle had its premiere at the opening of the exhibition One Year Home at Käthe Kollwitz Museum (Berlin) on February 26, 2017.

Since 2017, Kienzle reviewed and digitized the photo archive of Müllrose photographer Ursula Raschke, resulting in an online exhibition project in 2020 and in the urban space of Müllrose on his initiative.

As part of Kulturland Brandenburg's theme year in 2021: Future of the Past – Industrial Culture on the Move, Kienzle showed a first time retrospective of his work on industrial culture, spanning a work period of three decades, at the Senftenberg Fortress and Museumsfabrik Pritzwalk titled Brandenburg Industrial Landscapes 1992–2021. For 2024 he received a Villa Aurora grant for the project Döblin in Exile.

== Awards ==
- 2004 Muse Medallion of the American Cat Writers' Association for the book ABC Cat in the Category "Best Black and White Photo Series", Houston
- 2023 DigAMus Award, with Ronka Oberhammer, Omar Akahare and the Brandenburg Museum Association for a five-part video tutorial on object photography

== Grants ==
- 1996 Eddie Adams Grant for the Barnstorm IX Workshop, New York City
- 1997 Scholarship of the BildForum Herten for the Workshop for Photojournalism, Herten
- 2005 VG Bild-Kunst Award for the picture series Neukölln, Bonn
- 2012 Promotional Prize of VG Bild-Kunst for the photo project Döblins Berlin, Bonn
- 2016 Purchase of the picture series Tatort Fontane with means of the Berlin Lotto Foundation by the Artists' Fund of the Berlin Senate
- 2022 Promotional Prize of VG Bild-Kunst for the photo project Döblin in Exile, Bonn
- 2024 Villa Aurora Grant of the Senate Department for Culture and Europe in Berlin for Döblin in Exile, Los Angeles

== Exhibitions (selection) ==
- Monti Sabini, Photofusion Gallery London, 1995
- Im Lausitzer Braunkohlerevier, International Photo Days Herten, 1997
- Monti Sabini, Exposure – Hereford Photography Festival, England 1999
- Hutmacher, Städtisches Museum Sprucker Mühle Guben, 2000
- Terra da Mare, Centro Civico di Cornigliano, Genoa 2001
- The Hat Factory, Exposure – Hereford Photography Festival, England 2001
- Kommen, Bleiben, Gehen (Coming, Staying, Going), German-Polish Culture Festival Le Week End 3, Guben/Gubin, 2001
- Les chapeliers de Guben, Musée du chapeau, Chazelles-sur-Lyon 2002
- Terra da Mare, Photogalerie 94, Ennetbaden, Schweiz 2004
- Guben/Gubin, Exposure – Hereford Photography Festival, England 2004
- Museum/Porträt, Ministry of Science, Research and Culture, Potsdam 2005
- Hutmacher, Westfälisches Industriemuseum, Textilmuseum Bocholt, 2007; 2010–2012
- Gefängnis Luckau (Luckau Prison), Niederlausitzmuseum Luckau, 2009
- Tatort Fontane, Museum Neuruppin, 2010
- Neukölln, Galerie im Körnerpark, Berlin 2011
- Tatort Fontane, Museum und Galerie Falkensee, 2012
- Hutmacher, LVR-Industriemuseum Textilfabrik Cromford, 2014/2015
- Rüstung auf dem Prüfstand. Kummersdorf, Peenemünde und die totale Mobilmachung, Historisch-Technisches Museum Peenemünde, 2014/2015
- Horno, as part of the exhibition "Alltag Einheit", Deutsches Historisches Museum Berlin, 2015/2016
- Gesichter des Käthe-Kollwitz-Museums, zus. m. Ronka Oberhammer, Käthe Kollwitz Museum (Berlin), 2016
- Ein Jahr Heimat, Käthe-Kollwitz-Museum Berlin, 2017
- Contributions to Krieg oder Raumfahrt? Peenemünde in der öffentlichen Erinnerung seit 1945. Exhibition at Historisch-Technisches Museum Peenemünde 2019/2020
- Brandenburger Notizen: Fontane – Krüger – Kienzle. Exhibition Museum und Galerie Falkensee; Kurt Tucholsky Literaturmuseum Schloss Rheinsberg, Remise; Universitätsbibliothek Göttingen 2019
- Fontanes Berlin – Fotografien & Schriften. Fiktion & Wirklichkeit. Märkisches Museum Berlin, 2019
- Lorenz Kienzle Werkschau. Fotografien von 1994–2018. Galerie Argus Fotokunst Berlin, 2020.
- Gutspark Karwe. In: Wildnis, Gelände, Natur. With Ursula Böhmer, Ingar Krauss, Werner Mahler, Galerie Amalienpark – Raum für Kunst Berlin, 2021.
- Brandenburger Industrielandschaften 1992–2021. Kunstsammlung Lausitz at Festung Senftenberg and Museumsfabrik Pritzwalk, 2021.
- Die Ruinen von Peenemünde – Vom Werden und Vergehen einer Rüstungslandschaft. Historisch-Technisches Museum Peenemünde, 2023/2024.

== Publications ==
- Historisch-Technisches Museum Peenemünde (Ed.): "Die Ruinen von Peenemünde: Vom Werden und Vergehen einer Rüstungslandschaft." Quintus-Verlag, Berlin 2023. ISBN 9783969820742. (in German)
- "Arbeitswelten und Lebensräume. Brandenburger Industrielandschaften 1992–2021." Verlag für Berlin-Brandenburg, Berlin 2021. ISBN 9783969820094. (in German)
- "Brandenburger Notizen. Fontane – Krüger – Kienzle", Verlag für Berlin-Brandenburg, Berlin 2019. ISBN 9783947215423. (in German)
- Contributions to "Krieg oder Raumfahrt?: Peenemünde in der öffentlichen Erinnerung seit 1945", Ch. Links Verlag, Berlin 2019. ISBN 9783962890681. (in German)
- "It's still there: Döblin's Alexanderplatz", in: Williamson, Paul (ed.): The Art of Borrowing: Or How One Thing Leads to Another. Festival Publication of O/Modernt, Cambridge/Stockholm 2016. ISBN 9780992891237.
- Alfred Pacquement: "Richard Serra". Steidl Verlag, Göttingen 2015. ISBN 9783869309125.
- Aumann, Philipp: "Rüstung auf dem Prüfstand. Kummersdorf, Peenemünde und die totale Mobilmachung". Ch. Links Verlag, Berlin 2015. ISBN 9783861538646. (in German).
- "Sein Glück verdienen – Theodor Fontanes zeitlose Heldinnen", with Burkhard Spinnen, Knesebeck Verlag, Munich 2012. ISBN 9783868733938. (in German).
- "Die Befreiungshalle Kelheim: Geschichte – Mythos – Gegenwart". Regensburger Studien zur Kunstgeschichte, Ed. Christoph Wagner. Verlag Schnell & Steiner, Regensburg 2012. ISBN 9783795426170. (in German).
- "Constantin Brancusi and Richard Serra". Fondation Beyeler/Guggenheim Bilbao, Hatje Cantz Verlag, Berlin/Stuttgart 2009, 2. Aufl. 2011. ISBN 9783775728218.
- "Museen in Brandenburg". Museum Guide, Ed. Museumsverband Brandenburg e. V. 2008. (in German).
- "Monumenta 2008. Richard Serra, Promenade". Exhibition Catalogue, Eds. Centre National des Artes Plastiques / Editions du Centre Pompidou, Paris 2008. ISBN 9782844263605.
- "Luckau – Tor zur Niederlausitz. Mensch, Kultur, Natur". Exhibition Catalogue, Niederlausitz-Museum Luckau, 2008. (in German).
- "Richard Serra, Recent Works". Exhibition Catalogue, Gagosian Gallery, London 2007.
- "Richard Serra, Sculpture: Forty Years". Exhibition Catalogue, Museum of Modern Art, New York 2006. ISBN 9780870707124.
- "Schwarze Pumpe". Ed. Vattenfall Europe Mining & Generation. INIK (Institut für Neue Industriekultur), Forst 2005. ISBN 9783000162305. (in German).
- "ABC Cat". Stewart, Tabori & Chang, New York 2004. ISBN 9781584793854.
  - "Katten ABC". BZZTôH Publishers, Den Haag 2006. ISBN 9789045305431. (in Dutch).
  - "Das Katzen ABC". Knesebeck Verlag, Munich 2005. ISBN 9783896602794. (in German).
  - "Le cas du chat". Edition Manise, Paris 2005. ISBN 9782841982486. (in French).
- "Hutmacher. Bilder vom letzten Kapitel der Gubener Hutindustrie. Photographien von Lorenz Kienzle". Ausstellungskatalog, Städtisches Museum "Sprucker Mühle" Guben, 2000. (in German).
