= Alexander-von-Humboldt-Gymnasium, Konstanz =

Coordinates: 47°39′59″N 9°10′25″E

Alexander-von-Humboldt-Gymnasium
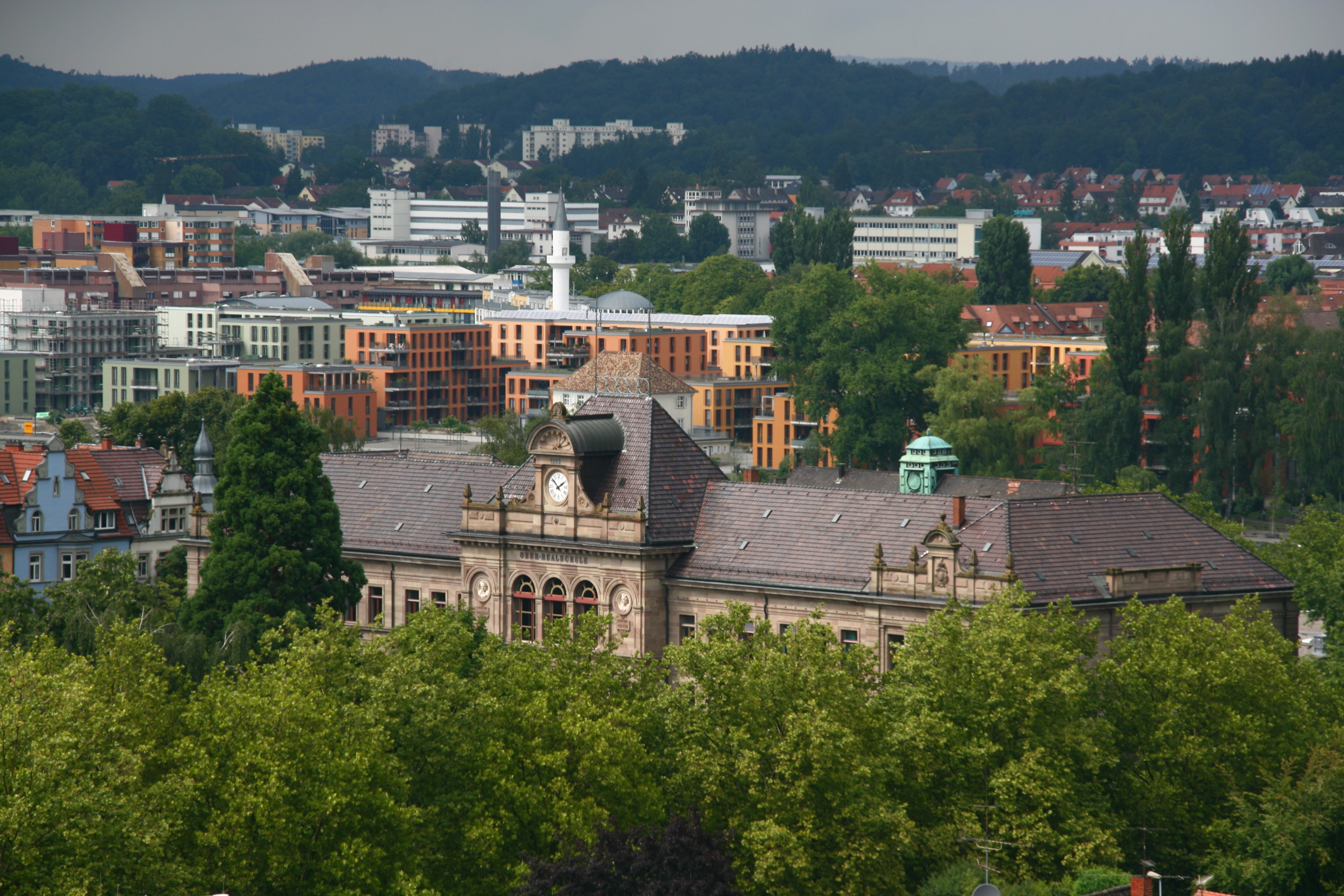

Location
- Schottenplatz 2; 78462 Konstanz; Konstanz; Baden-Württemberg; Germany

Information
- School type: Public Gymnasium
- Established: 1830; 196 years ago
- Grades: 5–13
- Enrollment: approximate 985
- Website: www.humboldt-konstanz.de

The Alexander-von-Humboldt-Gymnasium (English: Alexander von Humboldt Gymnasium) is a Gymnasium in Konstanz, Baden-Württemberg, Germany.

The eponym is Alexander von Humboldt (1769–1859). The school has approximately 82 teachers and 985 students.

== Partnership and exchange of pupils ==
Alexander-von-Humboldt-Gymnasium has an annual exchange of pupils with its twin towns Richmond (Great Britain) and Fontainebleau (France). Pupils of several secondary schools in Konstanz visit every two years the Czech twin town of Tábor. Every year a three-week stay in Orange County, California in The United States of America is offered.
