= Liselotte Strelow =

German photographer (1908–1981)

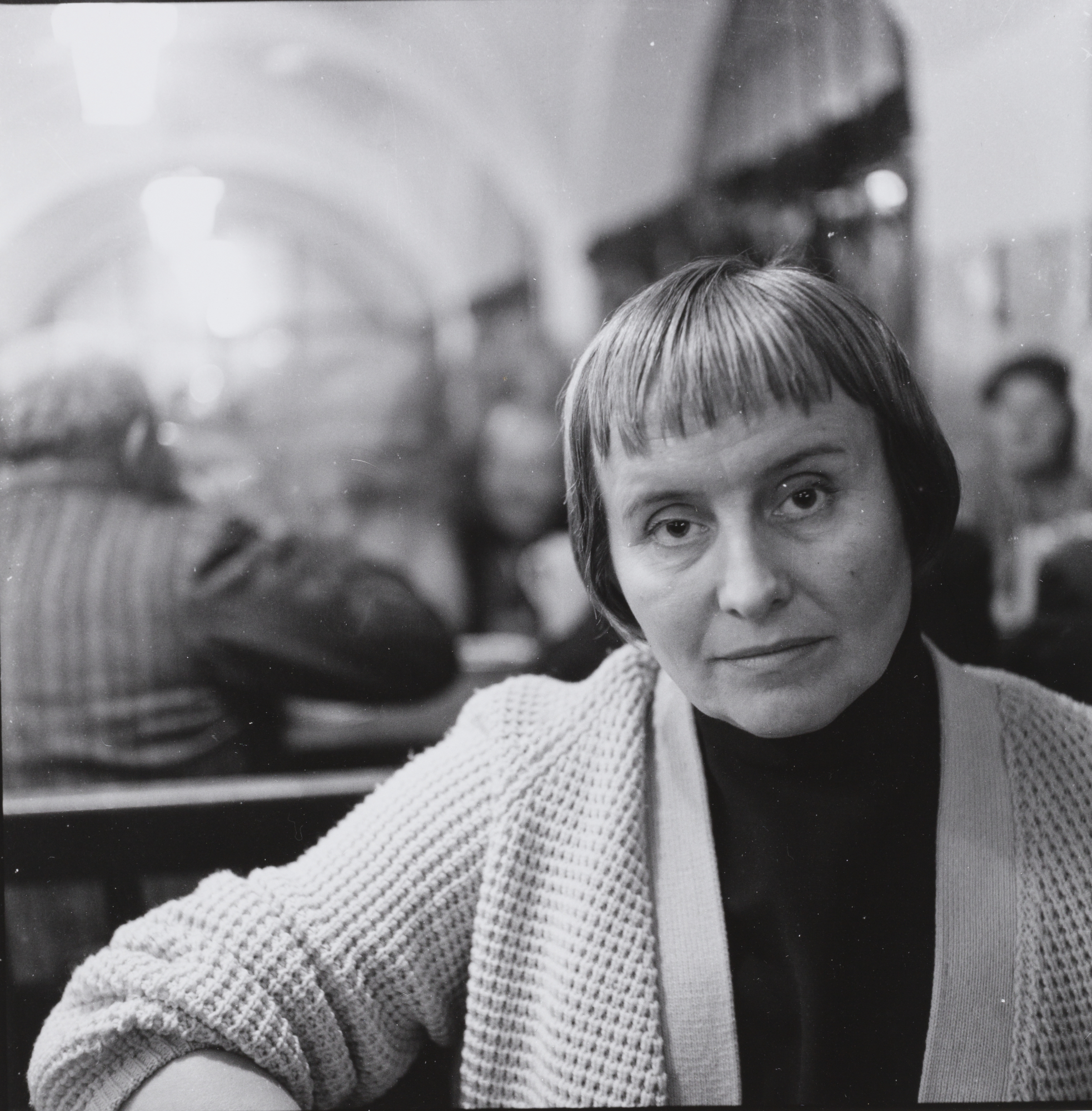
Liselotte Strelow, before 1962

Liselotte Strelow (11 September 1908 – 30 September 1981) was a German photographer.

== Life ==
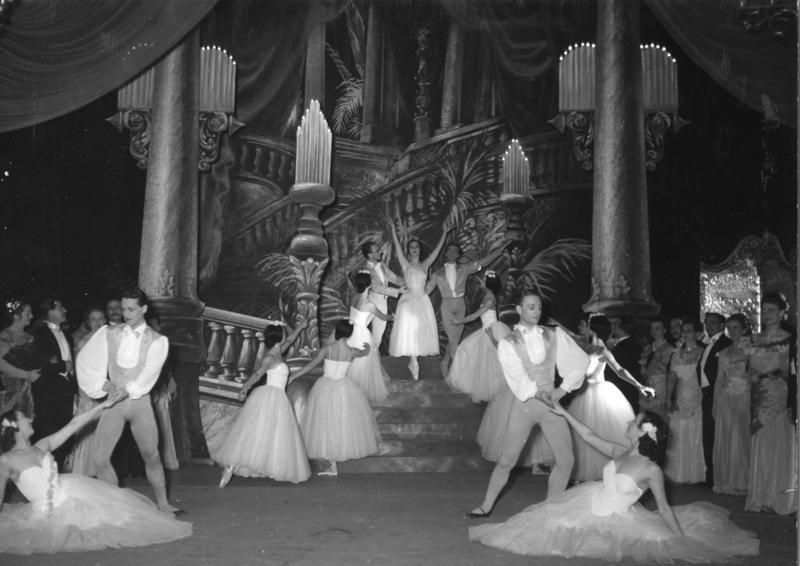
Scene from Die Fledermaus with Edel von Rothe, premiere at the Düsseldorfer Opernhaus 1954, photographed by Liselotte Strelow

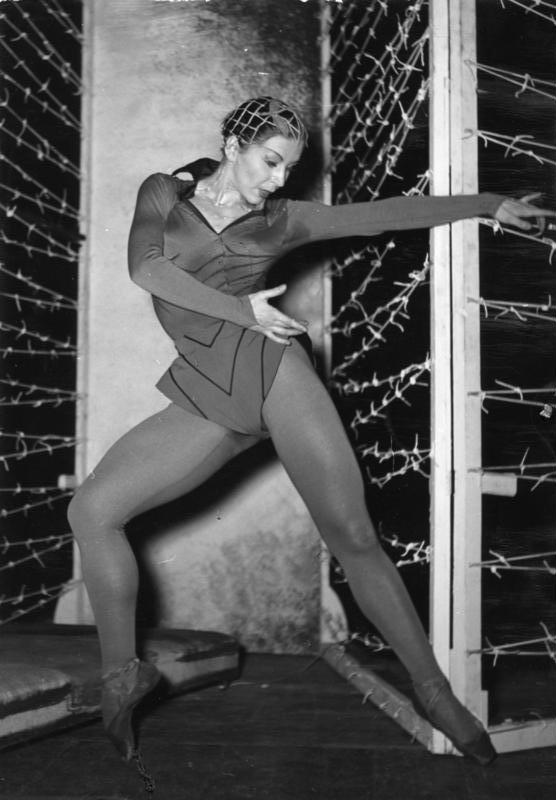
Edel von Rhote in Das Goldfischglas, Düsseldorfer Opernhaus 1954, photographed by Liselotte Strelow

Born in Redel, Pommerania, the farmer's daughter went to Berlin in 1930, where she took photography courses at the Lette-Verein school. In 1932, she learned in the studio of the Jewish photographer Suse Byk, after which she was employed by Kodak (Germany). In 1938, she took over Suse Byk's studio on Kurfürstendamm The studio as well as most of her photo archive were destroyed in a bombing raid in winter 1944.

After fleeing from Pomerania in 1945, she first went to Detmold, and in 1950 she opened a studio on Königsallee in Düsseldorf. She specialised in portrait and theatre photography. Her pictures in collaboration with Gustaf Gründgens and Elisabeth Flickenschildt soon made her famous. After the Deutsche Bundespost chose her portrait of Theodor Heuss as the basis for a series of stamps of the Bundespräsident in 1959, she was able to choose her clients. Her portraits of Konrad Adenauer, Rudolf Augstein, Maria Callas, Uwe Johnson and Thomas Mann as well as Ingeborg Bachmann, Gottfried Benn, Joseph Beuys, Lea Steinwasser, Jean Cocteau, Marlene Dietrich and Hildegard Knef.

Strelow was a member of the Gesellschaft Deutscher Lichtbildner (GDL) and the German Society for Photography (DGPh). A part of her photographic estate - mainly portrait photographs - is in the Rheinisches Landesmuseum Bonn in Bonn, the much larger part of his theatre photography estate is in the Theatermuseum Düsseldorf, sooner the "Dumont-Lindemann Archiv".

The photographer died in Hamburg at the age of 73.

== Prizes ==
- 1969: David Octavius Hill-Medaille, vergeben durch die Gesellschaft Deutscher Lichtbildner e.V. (GDL); seit 1988 vergeben durch :die Fotografische Akademie GDL, gemeinsam mit der Stadt Leinfelden-Echterdingen als David Octavius Hill Medaille / Kunstpreis der Stadt Leinfelden-Echterdingen
- 1976: Kulturpreis of the German Society for Photography (together with Rosemarie Clausen and Regina Relang)

== Exhibitions ==
- 2008/2009: Rheinisches Landesmuseum Bonn.
- 2009: Historisches Museum Frankfurt
- 2010: Willy-Brandt-Haus, Berlin
- 2010: Kunsthalle Erfurt
- 2019: Liselotte Stresow BILDERGESCHICHTEN, Johanna Breede PHOTOKUNST
