= Elli Marcus =

German American theatre photographer

Elli Marcus (11 December 1899 – 8 August 1977) was a German-American theater photographer.

== Life ==
Born in Berlin, Marcus opened her first photo studio in Berlin in 1918 and specialised in fashion photography and advertising photography. Outside her studio she worked mainly as a film and theatre photographer.

After Hitler's Machtergreifung in 1933, the early widowed Jewish woman emigrated with her son to Paris in 1934, where she opened another photo studio. When the National Socialists later occupied France, she fled to New York in March 1941. In Hollywood, she photographed Marlene Dietrich and other stars of the time.

Among her pupils were Rosemarie Clausen and Fred Erismann.

Marcus died in New York City at the age of 77.
