= Reza Moatarian =

Photo Journalist

- رضا معطریان
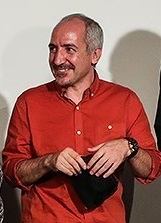
- Born: 1969; Mashhad, Iran
- Occupation: Photographer

Reza Moatarian (Born in 1969 in Mashhad) is an Iranian photojournalist.

He contributes with different media such as Hamshahri, Iran and Shargh Newspaper. He has been assigned as head of competition and photo exhibitions of the Fajr International Theater Festival.
