= Fritz Hennenberg =

German musicologist (born 1932)

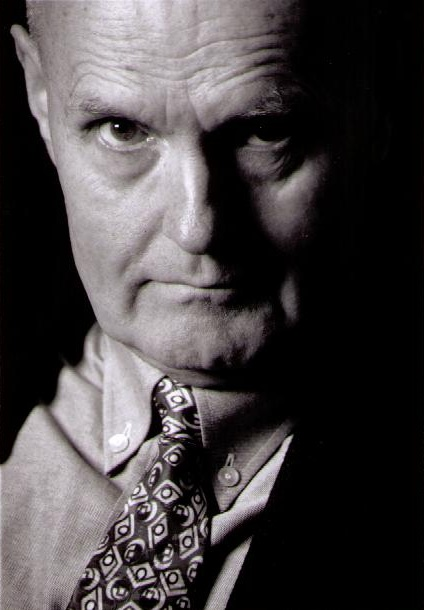
- Hennenberg in 2013
- Born: June 11, 1932 (age 94); Döbeln, Saxony, Germany
- Occupations: Musicologist and dramaturg
- Website: www.fritz-hennenberg.de

Fritz Hennenberg (born 11 June 1932) is a German musicologist and dramaturg.

== Life ==
Hennenberg was born in Döbeln in 1932 as the son of the architect and master builder Kurt Hennenberg and his wife Johanna. After Abitur in 1951 at the Döbelner Realgymnasium (Lessing secondary school) he studied piano and conducting with Oskar Halfter and Martin Flämig as well as musicology with Walter Serauky and Hellmuth Christian Wolff at the Leipzig University. He also attended lectures by Ernst Bloch. (philosophy) and Eva Lips (ethnology). In 1965 he was awarded a doctorate with a dissertation on 'Das Kantatenschaffen of Gottfried Heinrich Stölzel.

From 1954 to 1956 he was a lecturer at the Theaterhochschule Leipzig and from 1956 to 1959 assistant for historical musicology at the Halle Conservatory. In the 1950s he created music for the student stage of Leipzig University and the Maxim Gorki Theater in Berlin. In 1956 he met the composer Paul Dessau and was closely associated with him until his death in 1979. In 1964, at the request of the conductor Herbert Kegel, Hennenberg was appointed Paul Dessau Concert editor of the MDR Leipzig Radio Symphony Orchestra, initially freelance, from 1974 to 1979 under fixed contract. In 1965 he founded the Leipziger Rathauskonzerte, which opened with the composer Wolfgang Fortner. In 1972 he was engaged as chief dramatic adviser to the Gewandhausorchester under Kurt Masur. At the radio he promoted contemporary music and made guest appearances with Luigi Dallapiccola, Hans Werner Henze, Boris Blacher, Ernst Krenek, Cristóbal Halffter, Witold Lutosławski, Luigi Nono and Krzysztof Penderecki, in a concert series called Composers as Interpreters.

From 1969 he worked together with the singer Roswitha Trexler, also as an accompanist, and gave guest performances with her in Austria, Switzerland, Denmark, the USA and other countries. He developed interpretation models for the complete recording of Hanns Eisler's songs for the Eisler record edition.

In 1987 Henneberg habilitated at the Martin Luther University of Halle-Wittenberg.

From 1990 to 1997 Hennenberg worked at the Leipzig Opera with director Udo Zimmermann as chief dramatic advisor.

In 1996 he met the composer Victor Fenigstein and presented analytical and biographical works on him. In 1998 and 2003 he received research commissions from the Orff-Zentrum München for studies on the relationship between Carl Orff and Bertolt Brecht.

Numerous guest lectures and workshops, among others at Harvard University in Cambridge, the Eduard-van-Beinum-Foundation Amsterdam, the University of San Diego, the Schoenberg Institute Los Angeles, the Hochschule für Musik und Theater Hamburg and Hochschule für Musik und Tanz Köln and the Mozarteum Salzburg.

== Publications ==
- Das Leipziger Gewandhausorchester. Edition Leipzig, 1962. Revised ed. Frankfurt/Leipzig: Insel Verlag, 1992. OCLC 925318864
- Dessau–Brecht: Musikalische Arbeiten. Berlin: Henschelverlag, 1963. OCLC 455104132
- Paul Dessau. Eine Biographie. Leipzig: Deutscher Verlag für Musik, 1965. OCLC 843415072
- Wolfgang Amadeus Mozart. Leipzig: Reclam, 1970 / 2nd ed. 1976. new ed. Hamburg: Rowohlt, 1992 / 2nd revised ed. 2005. Translated into Japanese, Croatian, Hungarian. Audio book 2006 (Deutsche Grammophon Gesellschaft/Die Zeit). Rowohlt Digitalbuch Plus (E-Book) 2011. OCLC 181445006
- Paul Dessau: Notizen zu Noten. (ed.) Leipzig: Reclam, 1974. OCLC 604086210
- Das Kantatenschaffen von Gottfried Heinrich Stölzel. Leipzig: Deutscher Verlag für Musik, 1976. OCLC 906186668
- Tadeusz Kaczyński: Gespräche mit Witold Lutosławski. (ed.) Leipzig: Reclam, 1976. OCLC 251379245
- Das große Brecht-Liederbuch. (ed.) Berlin: Henschelverlag/Frankfurt: Suhrkamp,1984. Paperback: Frankfurt: Suhrkamp, 1985. OCLC 54813664
- Hanns Eisler. Leipzig: Bibliographisches Institut, 1986/Hamburg: Rowohlt, 1987 (2nd edition 1998). Translated into Chinese.
- Gesang und Gesichter. Roswitha Trexler in Begegnungen mit Musikern und Musik. Berlin: Henschelverlag, 1990. OCLC 24410588
- Udo Zimmermann. Leidenschaft Musik – Abenteuer Theater. Bonn/Berlin: Bouvier, 1992.
- 300 Jahre Leipziger Oper. Geschichte und Gegenwart. Munich: Langen Müller, 1993.
- John Dew inszeniert Mozart. (ed.) Berlin: Henschelverlag, 1995.
- 'Es muss was Wunderbares sein...' Ralph Benatzky. Zwischen 'Weißem Rössl' und Hollywood. Vienna Zsolnay, 1998.
- Mein Leben – ein Spiel. Ein Portrait des Komponisten Victor Fenigstein. With the collaboration of Luc Deitz. Luxemburg: Kairos Edition, 2005.
- As co-editor: Materialien zu Brecht/Weill "Mahagonny". Frankfurt: Suhrkamp, 2006.
- Ralph Benatzky. Operette auf dem Weg zum Musical. Lebensbericht und Werkverzeichnis. Vienna: Edition Steinbauer, 2009.
- Geschichte der Leipziger Oper von den Anfängen bis zur Gegenwart. Beucha/Markkleeberg: Sax-Verlag, 2009. OCLC 492260363
- Begegnungen mit Kurt Schwaen und seiner Musik. Berlin: Kurt-Schwaen-Archiv, 2011. OCLC 767959765
- Orff-Studien. Leipzig: Engelsdorfer Verlag, 2011.
- Victor Fenigstein. Lebensprotokoll – Werkkommentare – Kataloge. Saarbrücken: Pfau-Verlag, 2013. OCLC 825730780

== Awards ==
- 1986: Hanns Eisler Prize
