= Deutsches Theatermuseum =

Museum in Munich, Germany

Coordinates: 48°8′37″N 11°34′49″E

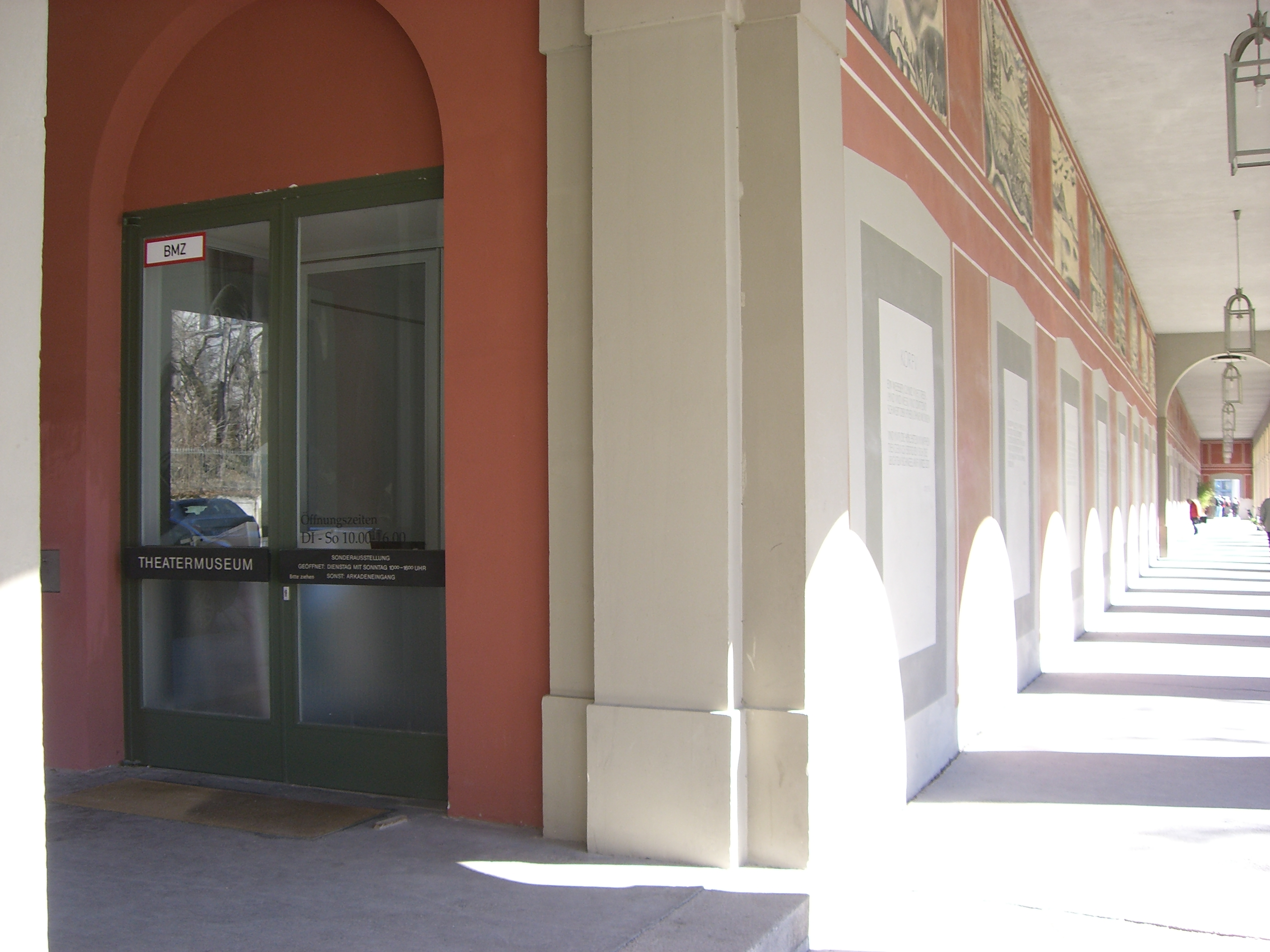
Deutsches Theatermuseum

The Deutsche Theatermuseum in Munich is a museum focused on history of the theater, and primarily devoted to the German-speaking theater history. It has its headquarters in the Churfürstlichen Gallerie (Electoral Gallery), built in 1780–1781 by Carl Albert von Lespilliez, and located in the Galeriestraße 4a at Hofgarten. Director of the Museum is currently the theater, art and literary scholar Claudia Blank. She is also director of the photography collection.

The museum was founded in the House of the Royal Bavarian Court actress Clara Zeiger, on 24 June 1910. In 1932, the Odyssee halls of the Munich Residenz were used as an exhibition space. The Clara-Ziegler Foundation established the Deutsches Theatermuseum in September 1979, and since then it has become a state museum.

The museum does not have a permanent exhibition. For special exhibitions related to a specific topic, various exhibitions including stage sets, theatrical construction plans, props, costumes and masks, as well as audiovisual documents are displayed. In addition, the museum houses the largest collection of theater photographs and an extensive archive and library with about 100,000 publications.

== Literature ==
- Deutsches Theatermuseum (2010). Deutsches Theatermuseum entdecken, was dahinter steckt (in German). München. ISBN 978-3-86916-073-3. OCLC 649503922.
