= Palais Garnier =

Opera house in Paris, France

- Opéra Garnier
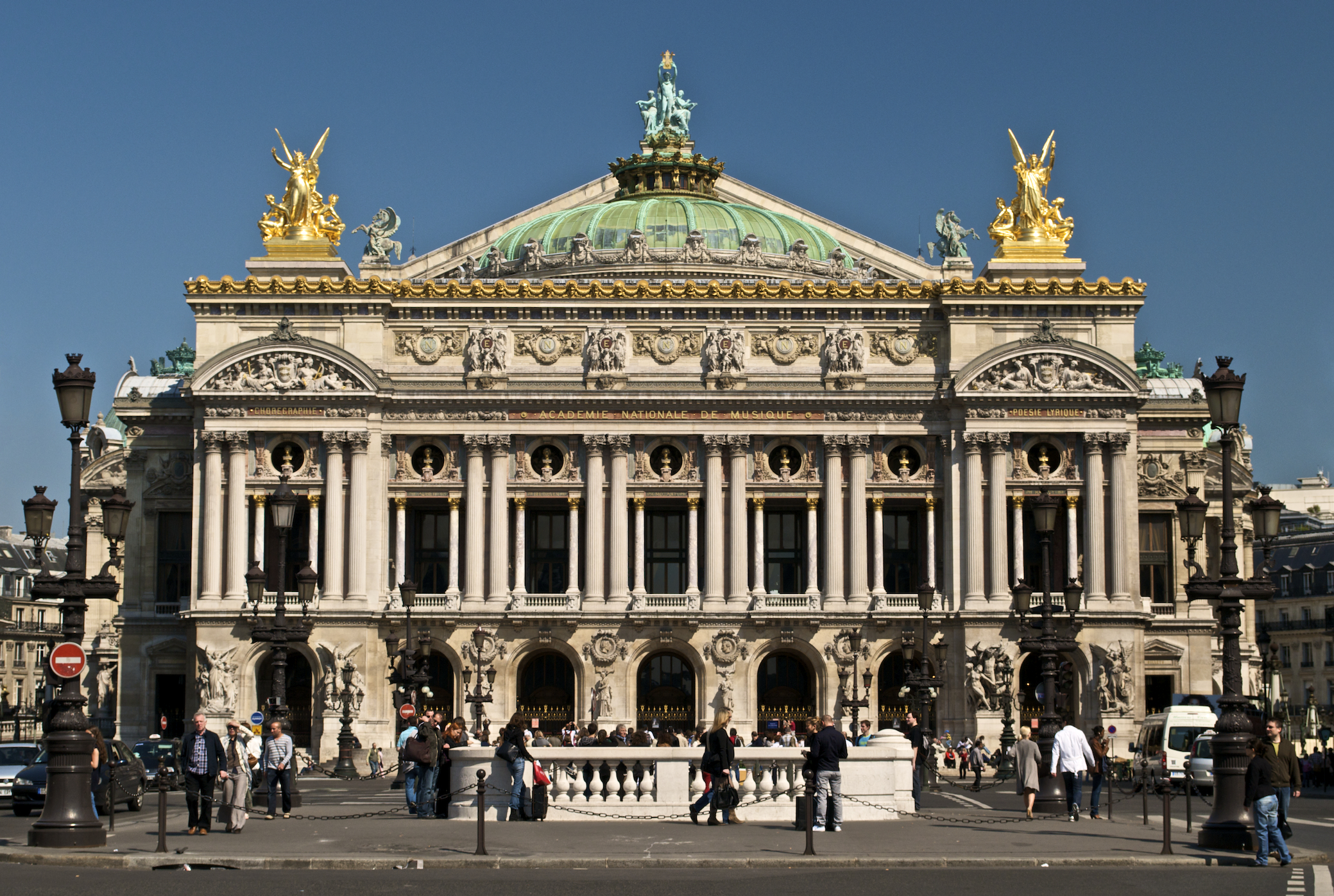
- View of the principal façade of the Palais Garnier from the Place de l'Opéra
- Interactive map of Palais Garnier
- Former names: Nouvel Opéra de Paris
- Address: Place de l'Opéra; 75009 Paris; France
- Coordinates: 48°52′19″N 2°19′54″E
- Capacity: 1,979
- Type: Opera house
- Public transit: Opéra, Chaussée d'Antin–La Fayette, Madeleine, Auber, 20, 21, 22, 27, 29, 42, 52, 66, 68, 81, 95

Construction
- Groundbreaking: August 1861
- Opened: 5 January 1875
- Cost: 36,010,571.04 francs (as of 20 November 1875)
- Architect: Charles Garnier

Tenant
- Paris National Opera

Website
- operadeparis.fr

Monument historique
- Designated: 16 October 1923
- Reference no.: PA00089004

The Palais Garnier (French: [palɛ ɡaʁnje], "Garnier Palace"), also known as Opéra Garnier (French: [ɔpeʁa ɡaʁnje], "Garnier Opera"), is a historic 1,979-seat opera house at the Place de l'Opéra in the 9th arrondissement of Paris, France. It was built for the Paris Opera from 1861 to 1875 at the behest of Emperor Napoleon III. Initially referred to as le nouvel Opéra de Paris (the new Paris Opera), it soon became known as the Palais Garnier, "in acknowledgment of its extraordinary opulence" and the architect Charles Garnier's plans and designs, which are representative of the Napoleon III style. It was the primary theatre of the Paris Opera and its associated Paris Opera Ballet until 1989, when a new opera house, the Opéra Bastille, opened at the Place de la Bastille. The company now uses the Palais Garnier mainly for ballet. The theatre has been a monument historique of France since 1923.

The Palais Garnier has been called "probably the most famous opera house in the world, a symbol of Paris like Notre Dame Cathedral, the Louvre, or the Sacré Coeur Basilica". This is at least partly due to its use as the setting for Gaston Leroux's 1910 novel The Phantom of the Opera and, especially, the novel's subsequent adaptations in films and the popular 1986 musical. Another contributing factor is that among the buildings constructed in Paris during the Second Empire, besides being the most expensive, it has been described as the only one that is "unquestionably a masterpiece of the first rank".

The Palais Garnier also houses the Bibliothèque-Musée de l'Opéra de Paris (Paris Opera Library-Museum), which is managed by the Bibliothèque Nationale de France and is included in unaccompanied tours of the Palais Garnier.

== Dimensions and technical details ==
The Palais Garnier is 56 metres (184 ft) from ground level to the apex of the stage flytower; 32 metres (105 ft) to the top of the façade.

The building is 154.9 metres (508 ft) long; 70.2 metres (230 ft) wide at the lateral galleries; 101.2 metres (332 ft) wide at the east and west pavilions; 10.13 metres (33.2 ft) from ground level to bottom of the cistern under the stage.

The structural system is made of masonry walls; concealed iron floors, vaults, and roofs.

== Architecture and style ==
The opera was constructed in what Charles Garnier (1825–1898) is said to have told the Empress Eugenie was "Napoleon III" style The Napoleon III style was highly eclectic, and borrowed from many historical sources; the opera house included elements from the Baroque, the classicism of Palladio, and Renaissance architecture blended together. These were combined with axial symmetry and modern techniques and materials, including the use of an iron framework, which had been pioneered in other Napoleon III buildings, including the Bibliothèque Nationale and the markets of Les Halles.

Plans of the Palais Garnier

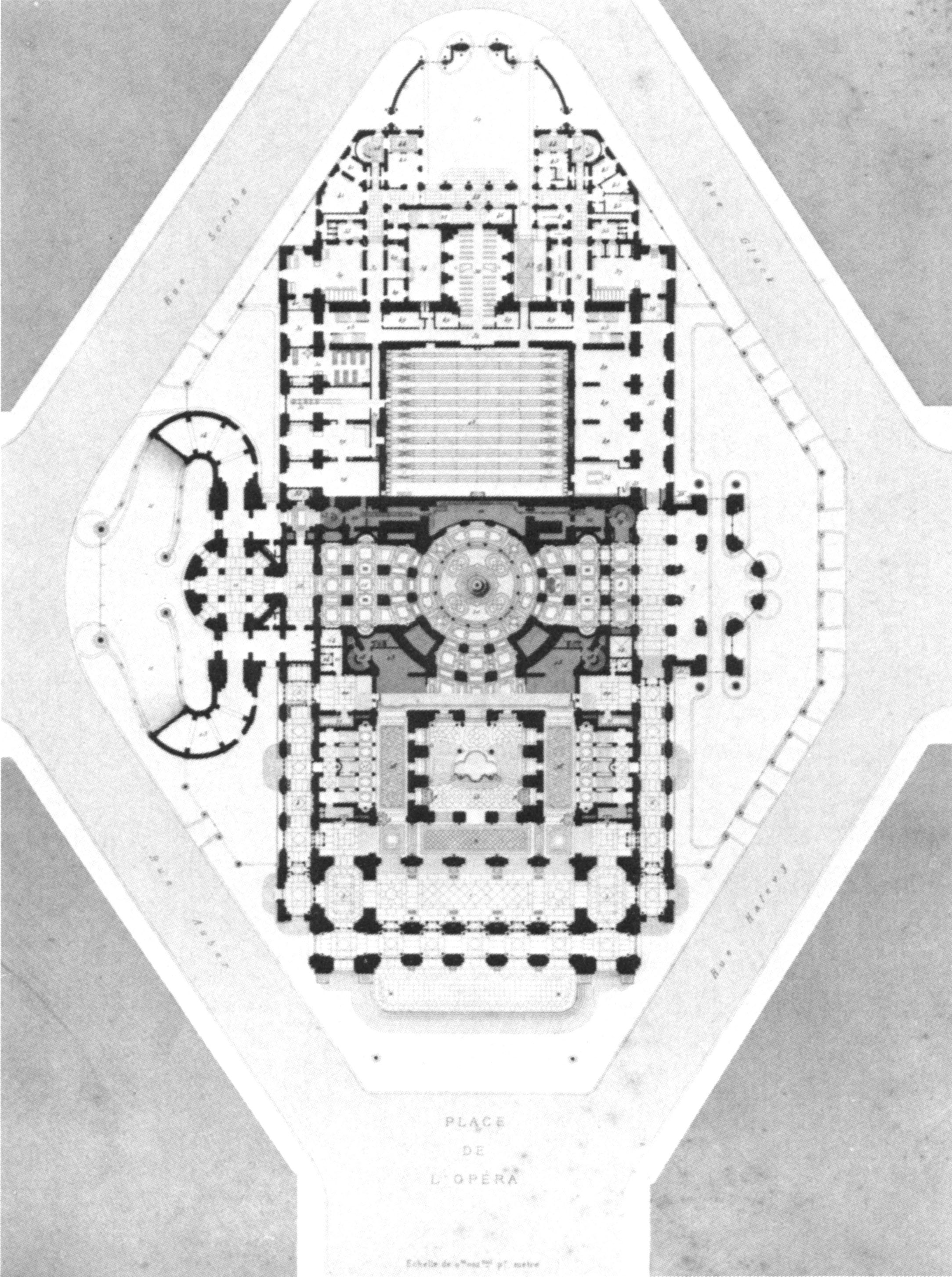
Plan of the ground floor

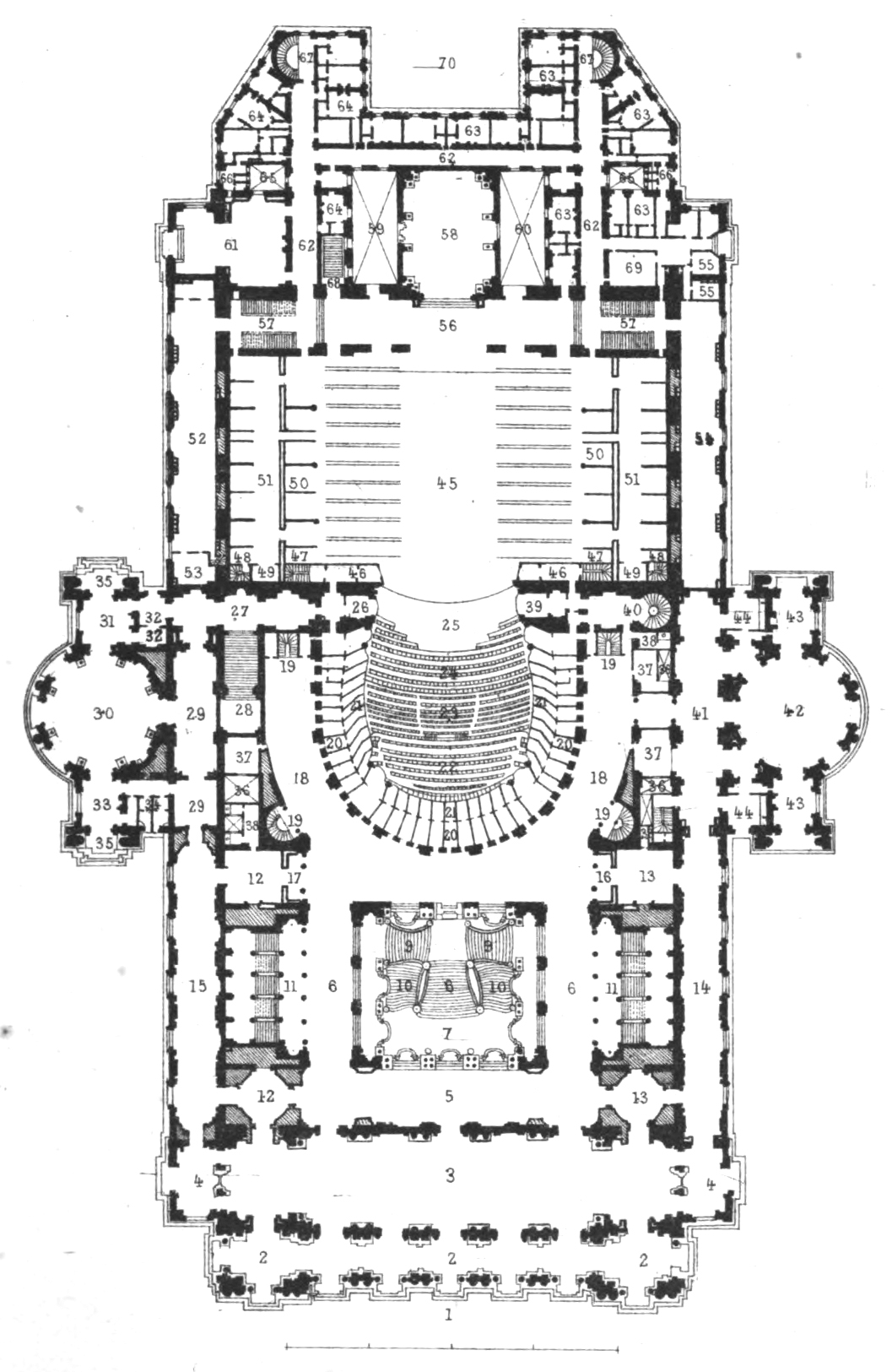
Plan of the main floor

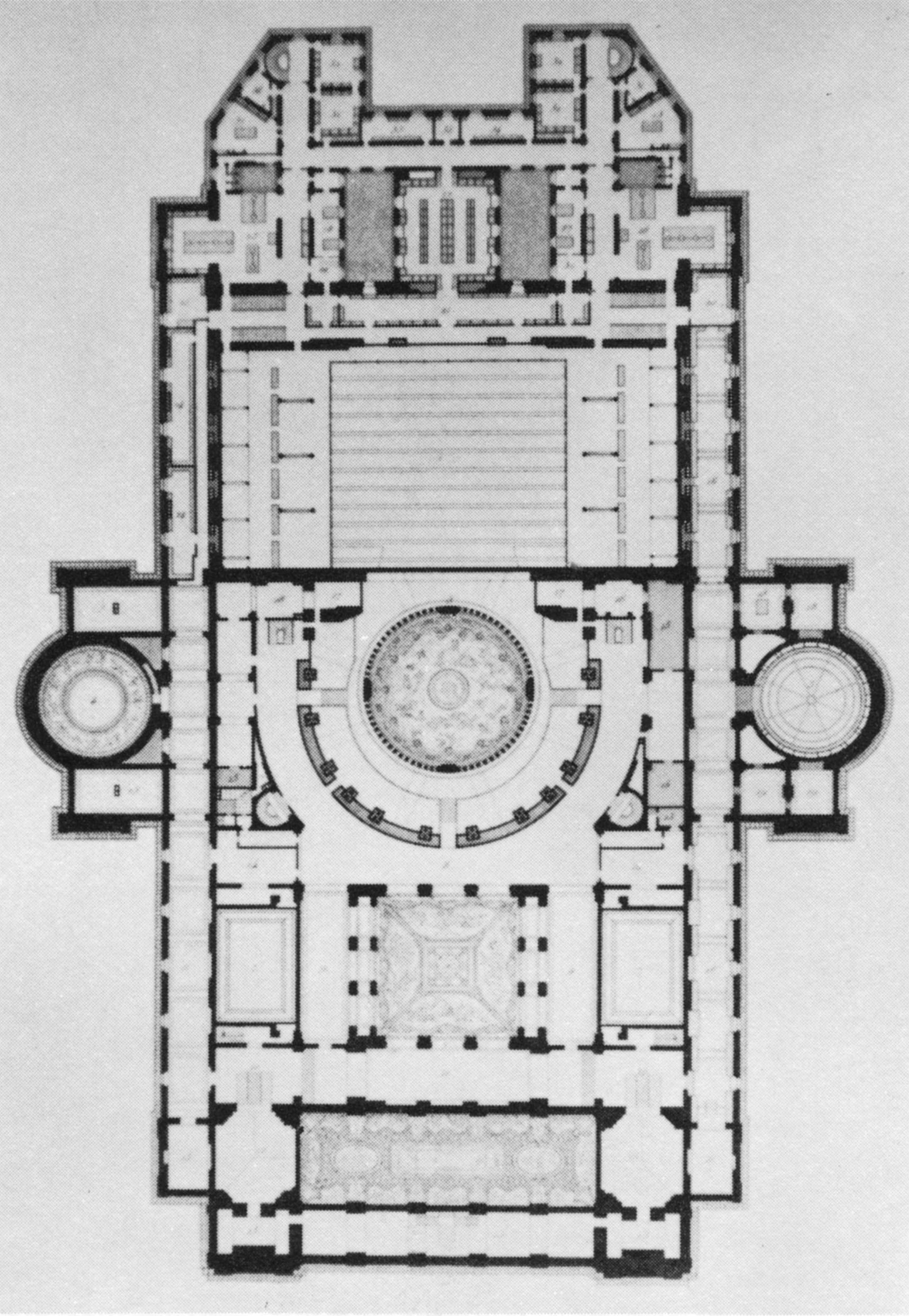
Plan at the auditorium ceiling level

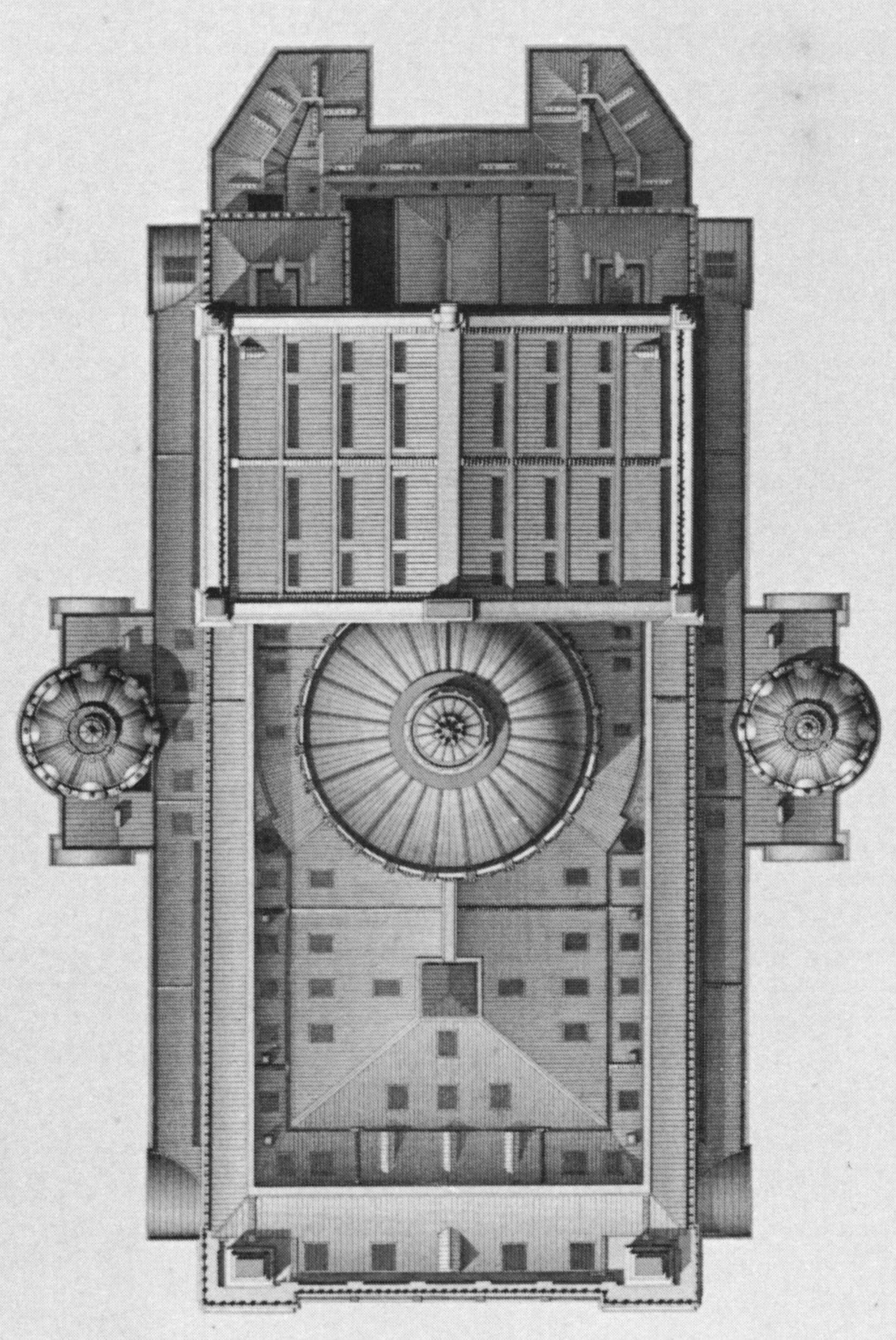
Plan of the roof

The façade and the interior followed the Napoleon III style principle of leaving no space without decoration. Garnier used polychromy, or a variety of colors, for theatrical effect, achieved different varieties of marble and stone, porphyry, and gilded bronze. The façade of the opera used seventeen different kinds of material, arranged in very elaborate multicolored marble friezes, columns, and lavish statuary, many of which portray deities of Greek mythology.

=== Exterior ===
==== Main façade ====
The principal façade is on the south side of the building, overlooking the Place de l'Opéra and terminates the perspective along the Avenue de l'Opéra. Fourteen painters, mosaicists and seventy-three sculptors participated in the creation of its ornamentation.

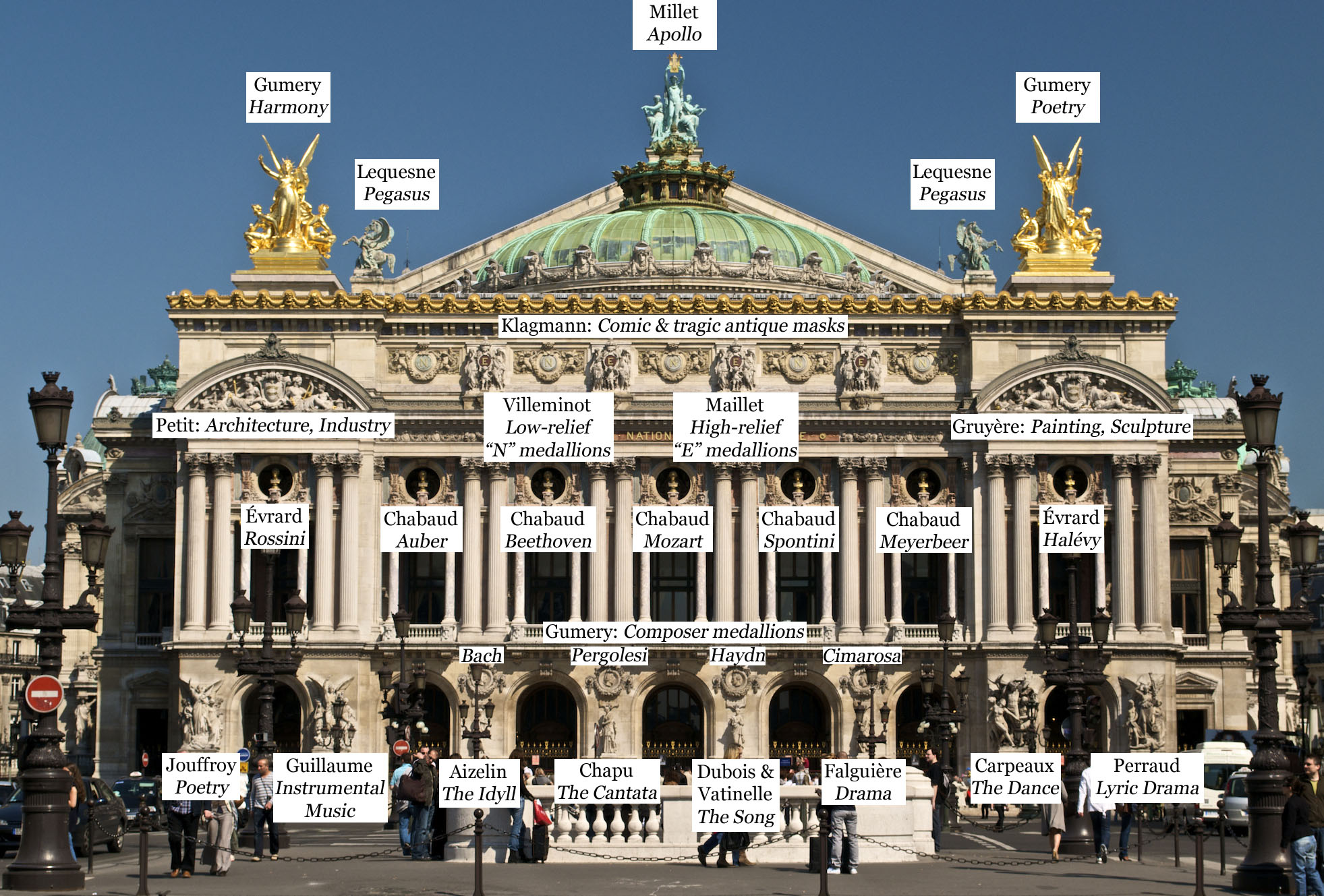
Façade of the Palais Garnier with labels indicating the locations of various sculptures

The two gilded figural groups, Charles Gumery's L'Harmonie (Harmony) and La Poésie (Poetry), crown the apexes of the principal façade's left and right avant-corps. They are both made of gilt copper electrotype.

Below Gumery's L'Harmonie, in the left (west) pediment, is a sculpted relief of two women sitting down representing Architecture and Industry by Jean Claude Petit. The women surround an escutcheon with the words "ARCHITECTURE" and "INDUSTRIE" in gold. The woman who represents architecture holds a compass and a plan of the Opéra Nouvel, at her feet is a winged genius holding a torch. The woman representing industry holds a lead pig and a hammer, while a winged genius stands at her feet, carrying a cup full of jewels.

In the right (east) pediment a sculpture of two women sitting down representing Painting and Sculpture by Théodore Gruyère. The women surround an escutcheon with the words "PEINTURE" (painting) and "SCULPTURE" in gold. The woman who represents painting holds a brush and a palette, at her feet is a putto holding a pencil. The woman representing sculpture holds a hammer and a chisel, at her feet is a putto sculpturing a bust with a mallet and a gouge.

The bases of the two avant-corps are decorated (from left to right) with four major multi-figure groups sculpted by François Jouffroy (Poetry, also known as Harmony), Jean-Baptiste Claude Eugène Guillaume (Instrumental Music), Jean-Baptiste Carpeaux (The Dance, criticised for indecency), and Jean-Joseph Perraud (Lyrical Drama). The façade also incorporates other work by Gumery, Alexandre Falguière and others.

Gilded galvanoplastic bronze busts of many of the great composers are located between the columns of the theatre's front façade and depict, from left to right, Rossini, Auber, Beethoven, Mozart, Spontini, Meyerbeer, and Halévy. On the left and right lateral returns of the front façade are busts of the librettists Eugène Scribe and Philippe Quinault, respectively.

The attic storey façade is decorated with low and high reliefs with the letters "N" and "E", the imperial monogram (Napoléon Empereur). The low reliefs are by Louis Villeminot, and the high reliefs are by Jacques-Léonard Maillet. The high reliefs consist of four sets of ornamental figures. Each group has two winged women on either side of a putto holding up a medallion bearing the letter ("E") and the imperial crown. One woman has a trumpet and a palm, the other, a torch and a palm. There were four repetitions of these themes. Two groups have a globe and a lyre on the ground, and the two other groups have two scrolls, a mask, and a laurel wreath. There are seven low reliefs with medallions surrounded by scrolls with two children on either side holding up a garland of flowers and fruits. Five are in the central part of the attic storey having the letter ("N") in the medallion and alternate the high reliefs, and the other two are on the east and west returns of the avant-corps.

A frieze running along the top of the attic storey has fifty-three comic and tragic antique masks in gilt cast iron by Jean-Baptiste Klagmann.

Exterior artwork

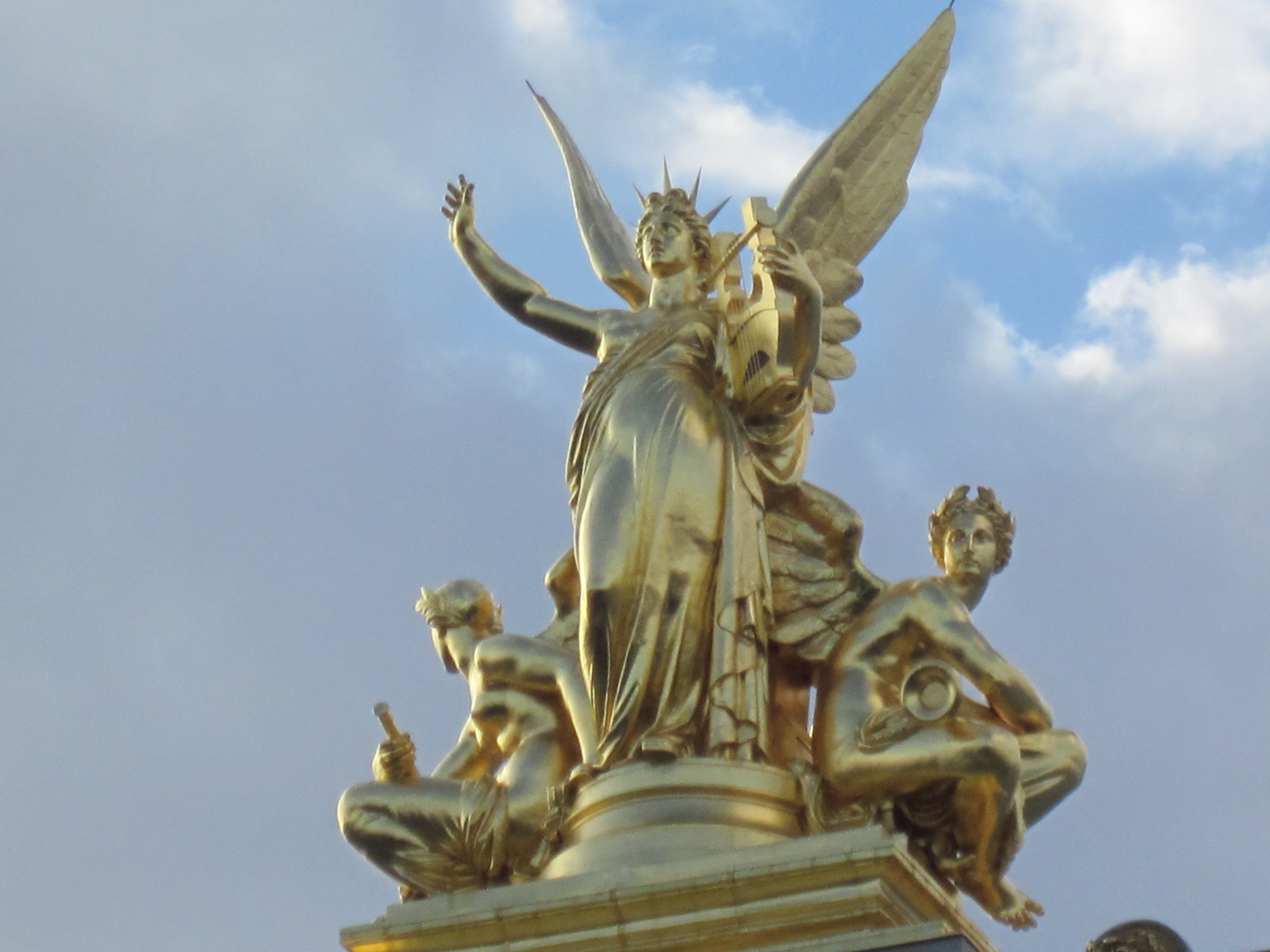
Gumery's L'Harmonie (1869), atop the left avant-corps of the façade, is 7.5 metres (25 ft) of gilt copper electrotype

Apollo, Poetry and Music roof sculpture by Aimé Millet

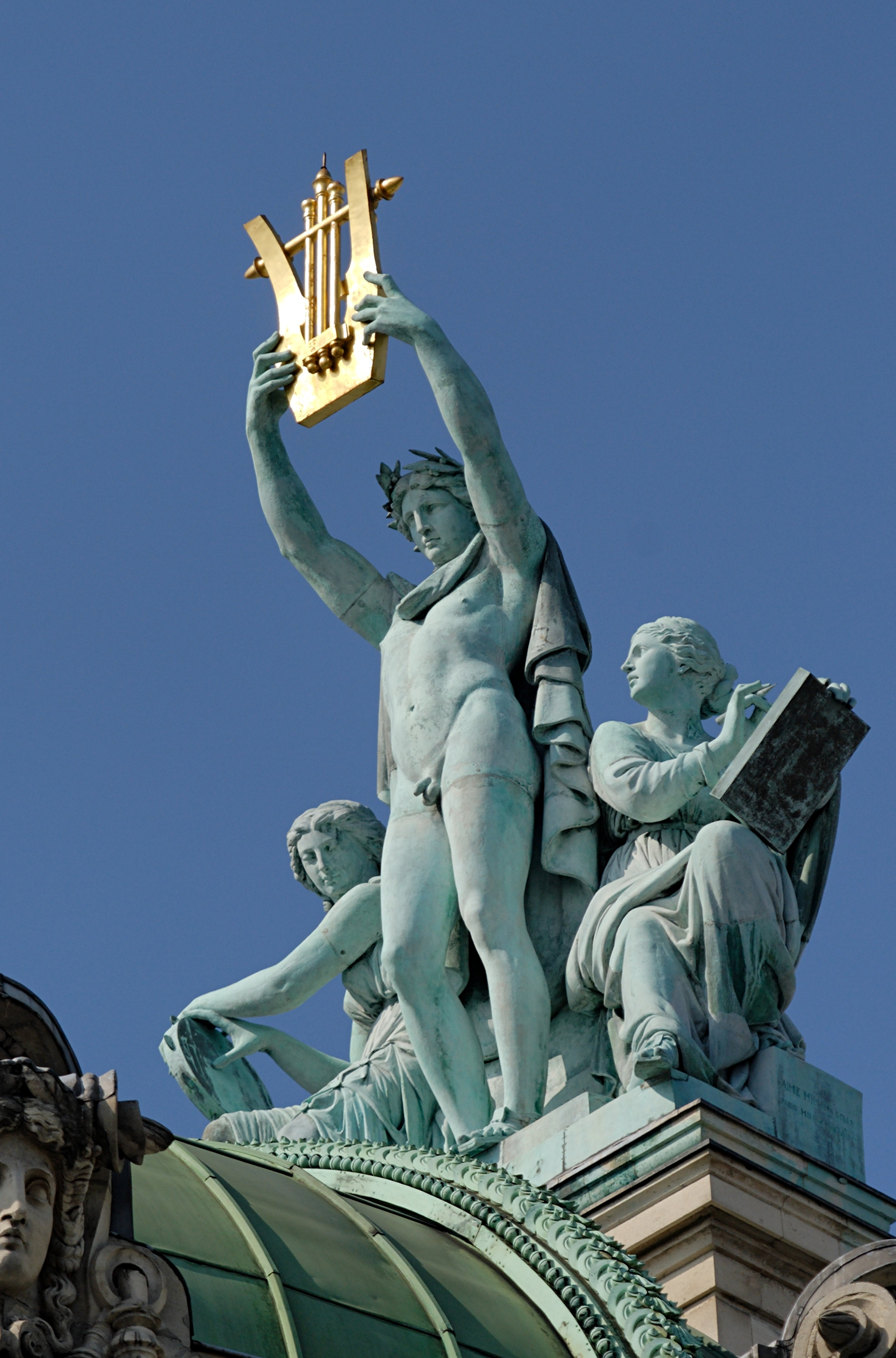
Apollo, Poetry and Music; Apollo's lyre detail

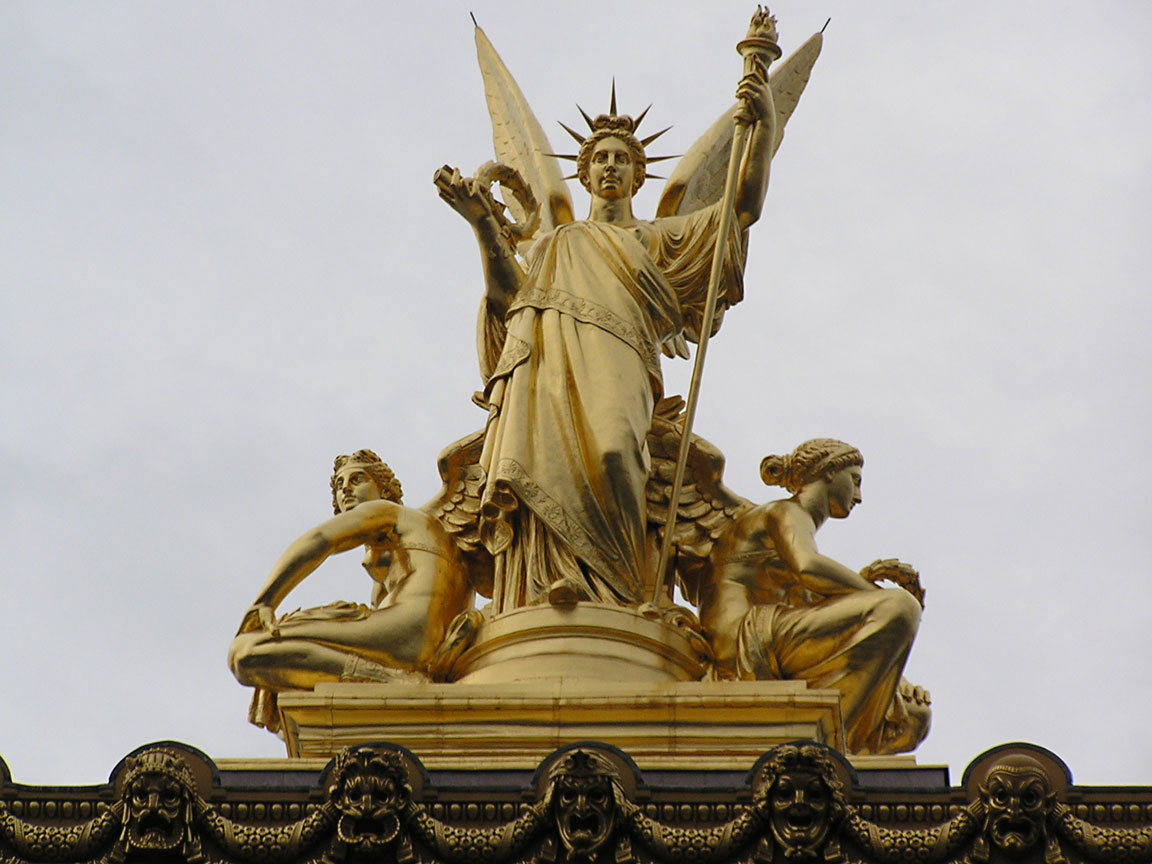
Poetry roof sculpture by Charles Gumery

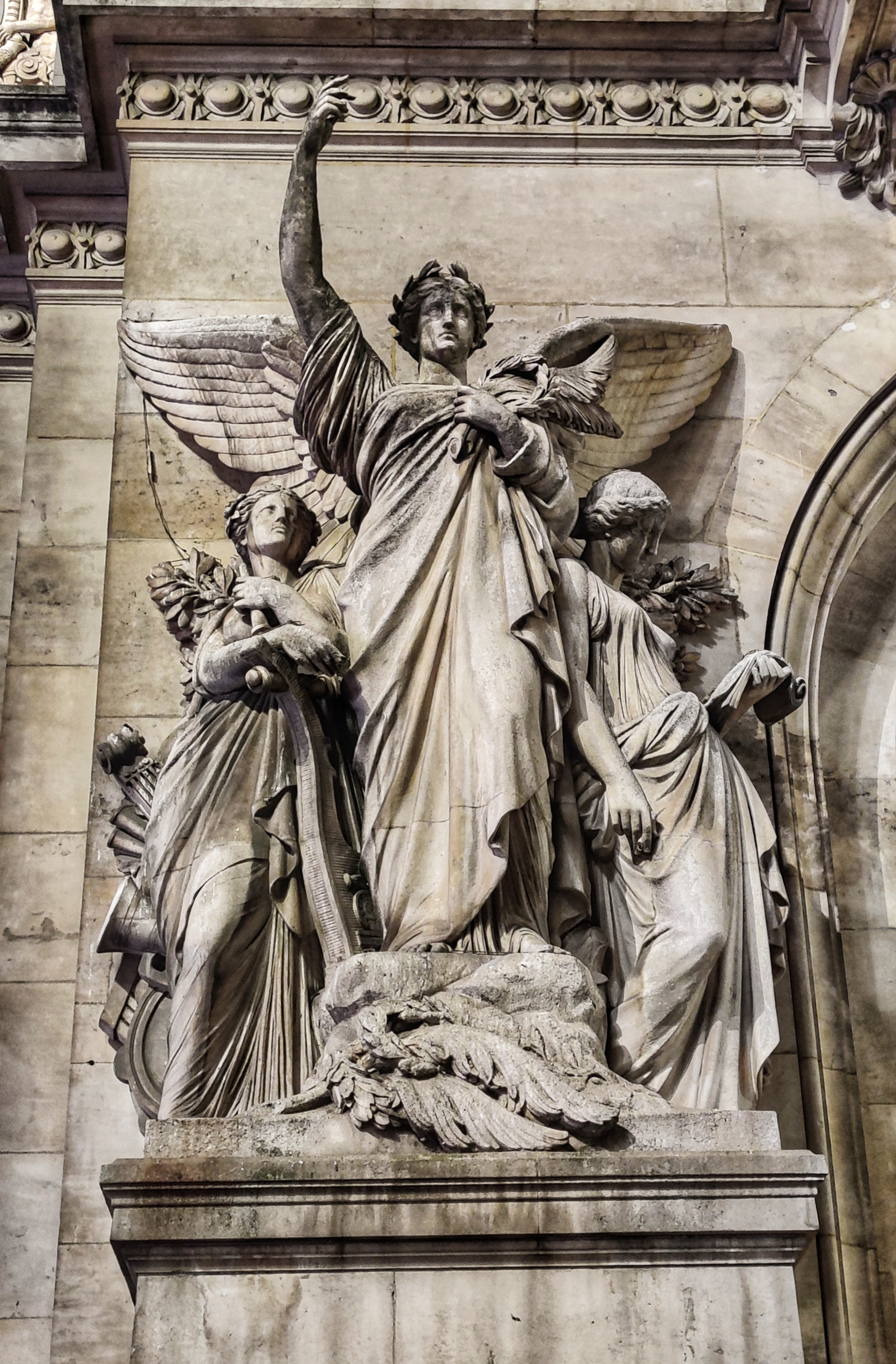
Harmony façade sculpture by Francois Jouffroy (depicts Harmony-Poetry-Music)

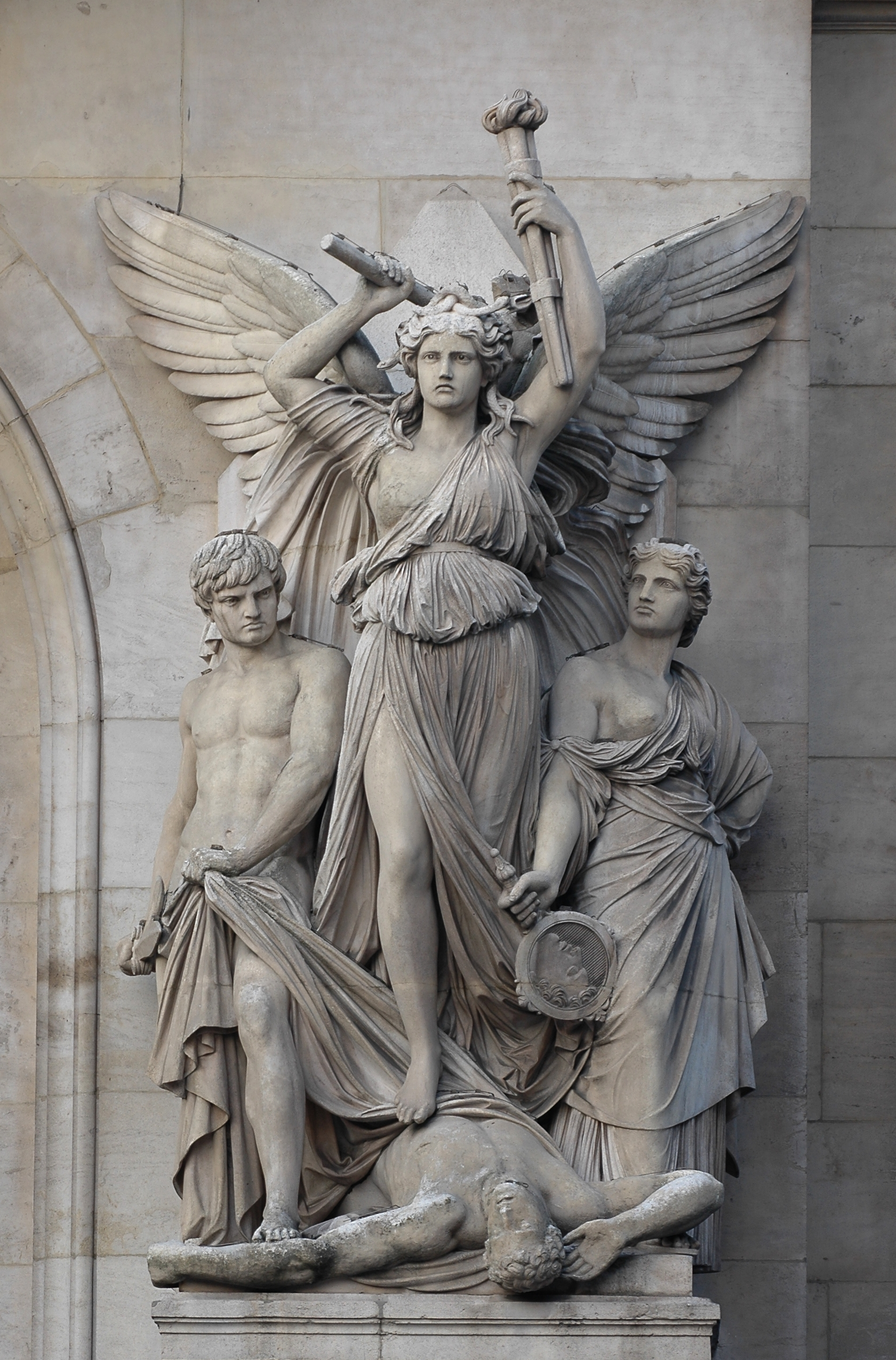
Lyrical Drama façade sculpture by Jean-Joseph Perraud

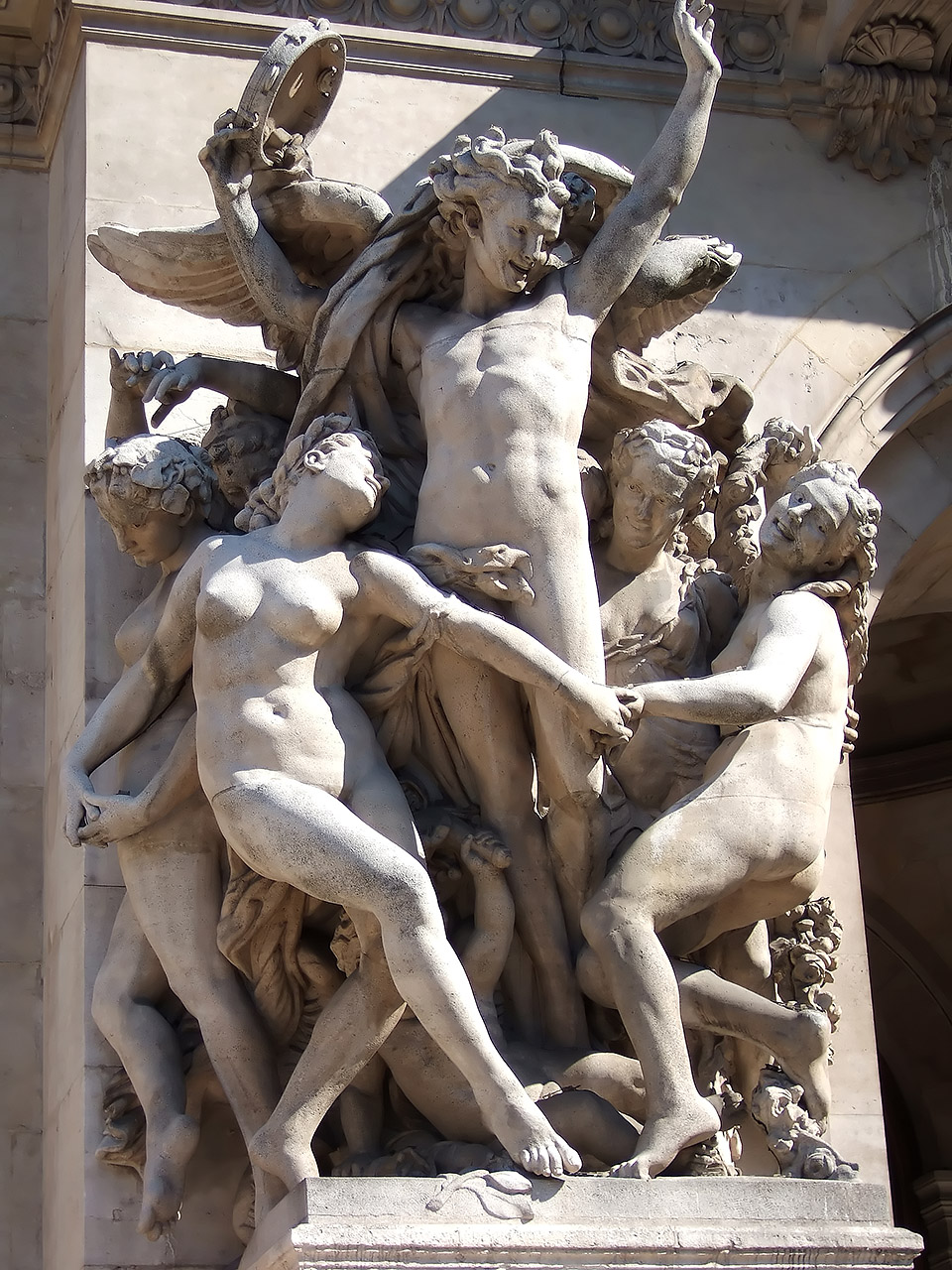
The Dance by Jean-Baptiste Carpeaux

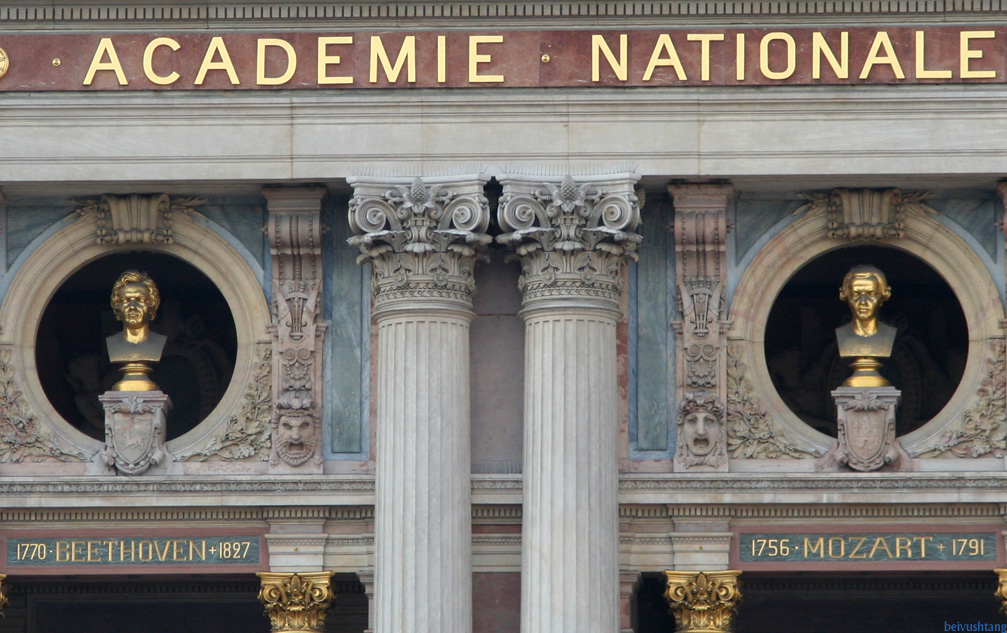
Bronze busts of Beethoven and Mozart on the front façade

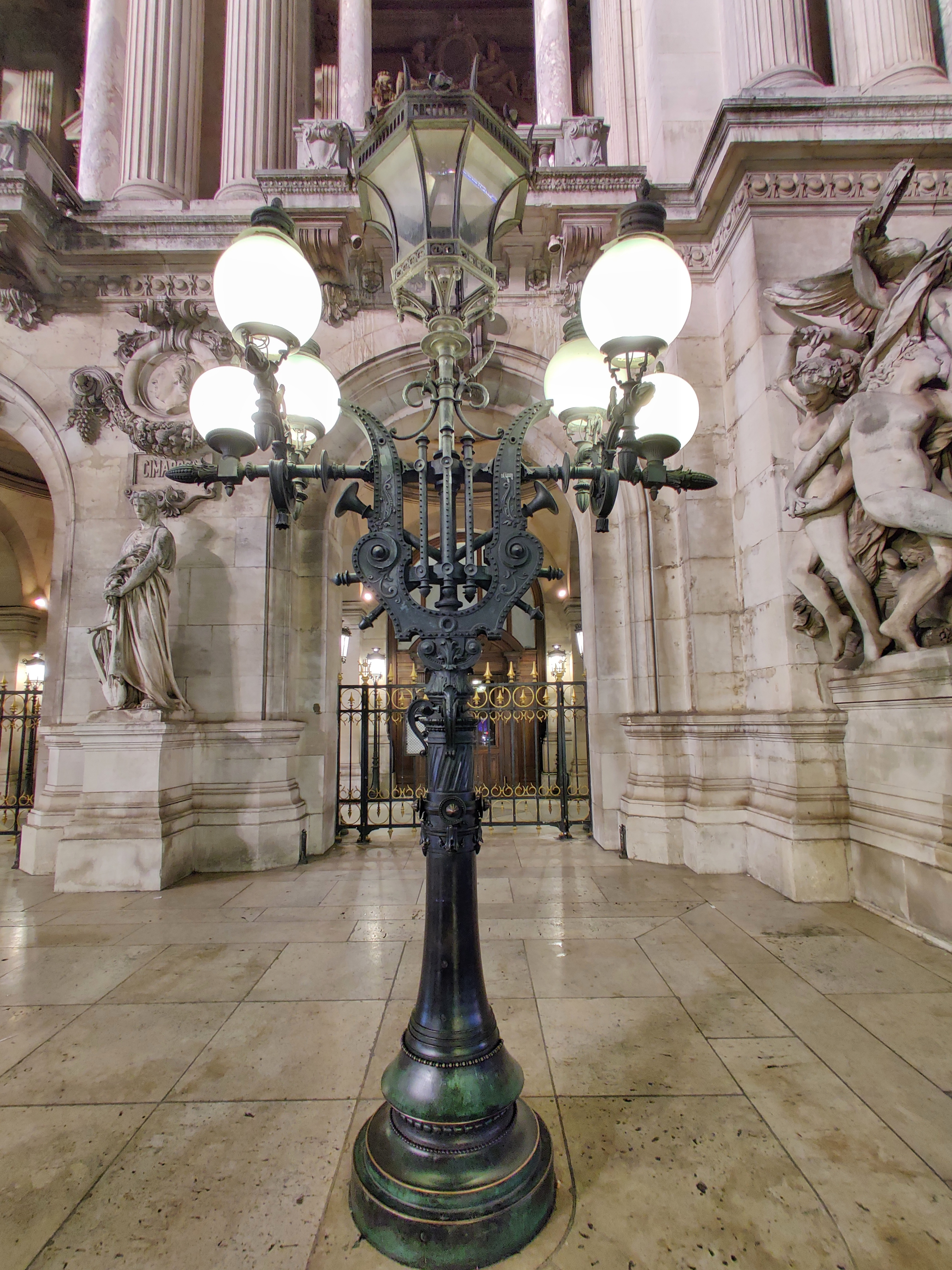
Light outside the building

==== Stage flytower ====
The sculptural group Apollo, Poetry, and Music, located at the apex of the south gable of the stage flytower, is the work of Aimé Millet, and the two smaller bronze Pegasus figures at either end of the south gable are by Eugène-Louis Lequesne.

==== Pavillon de l'Empereur ====
Also known as the Rotonde de l'Empereur, this group of rooms is located on the left (west) side of the building and was designed to allow secure and direct access by the Emperor via a double ramp to the building. When the Empire fell, work stopped, leaving unfinished dressed stonework. It now houses the Bibliothèque-Musée de l'Opéra de Paris (Paris Opera Library-Museum) which is home to nearly 600,000 documents including 100,000 books, 1,680 periodicals, 10,000 programs, letters, 100,000 photographs, sketches of costumes and sets, posters and historical administrative records.

==== Pavillon des Abonnés ====
Located on the right (east) side of the building as a counterpart to the Pavillon de l'Empereur, this pavilion was designed to allow subscribers (abonnés) direct access from their carriages to the interior of the building. It is covered by a 13.5-metre (44-ft) diameter dome. Paired obelisks mark the entrances to the rotunda on the north and the south.

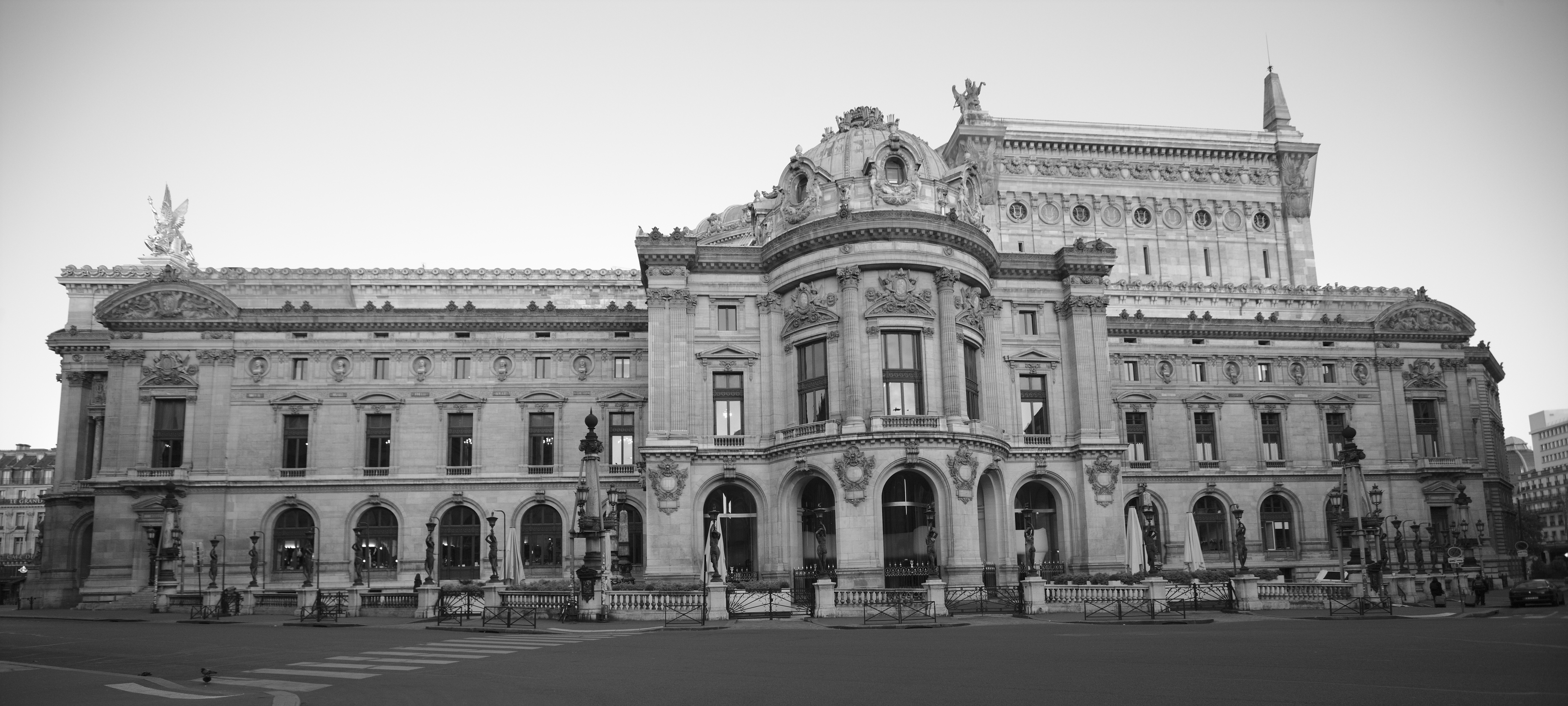
East façade and the Pavillon des Abonnés

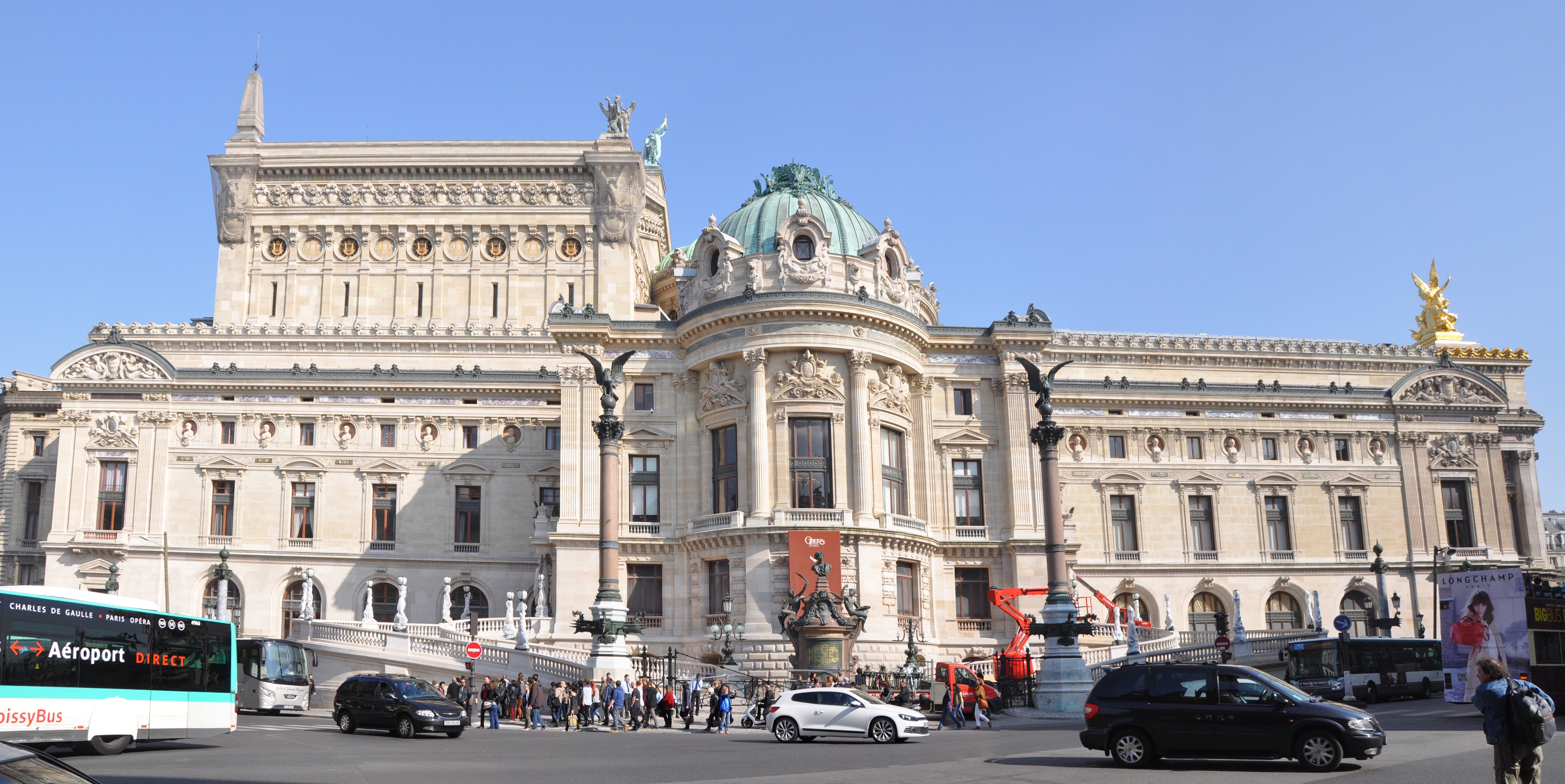
West façade and the Pavillon de l'Empereur

=== Interior ===
The interior consists of interweaving corridors, stairwells, alcoves and landings, allowing the movement of large numbers of people and space for socialising during intermission. Rich with velvet, gold leaf, and cherubim and nymphs, the interior is characteristic of Baroque sumptuousness.

==== Grand staircase ====
The building features a large ceremonial staircase of white marble with a balustrade of red and green marble, which divides into two divergent flights of stairs that lead to the Grand Foyer. Its design was inspired by Victor Louis's grand staircase for the Théâtre de Bordeaux. The pedestals of the staircase are decorated with female torchères, created by Albert-Ernest Carrier-Belleuse. The ceiling above the staircase was painted by Isidore Pils to depict The Triumph of Apollo, The Enchantment of Music Deploying its Charms, Minerva Fighting Brutality Watched by the Gods of Olympus, and The City of Paris Receiving the Plan of the New Opéra. When the paintings were first fixed in place two months before the opening of the building, it was obvious to Garnier that they were too dark for the space. With the help of two of his students, Pils had to rework the canvases while they were in place overhead on the ceiling and, at the age of 61, he fell ill. His students had to finish the work, which was completed the day before the opening and the scaffolding was removed.

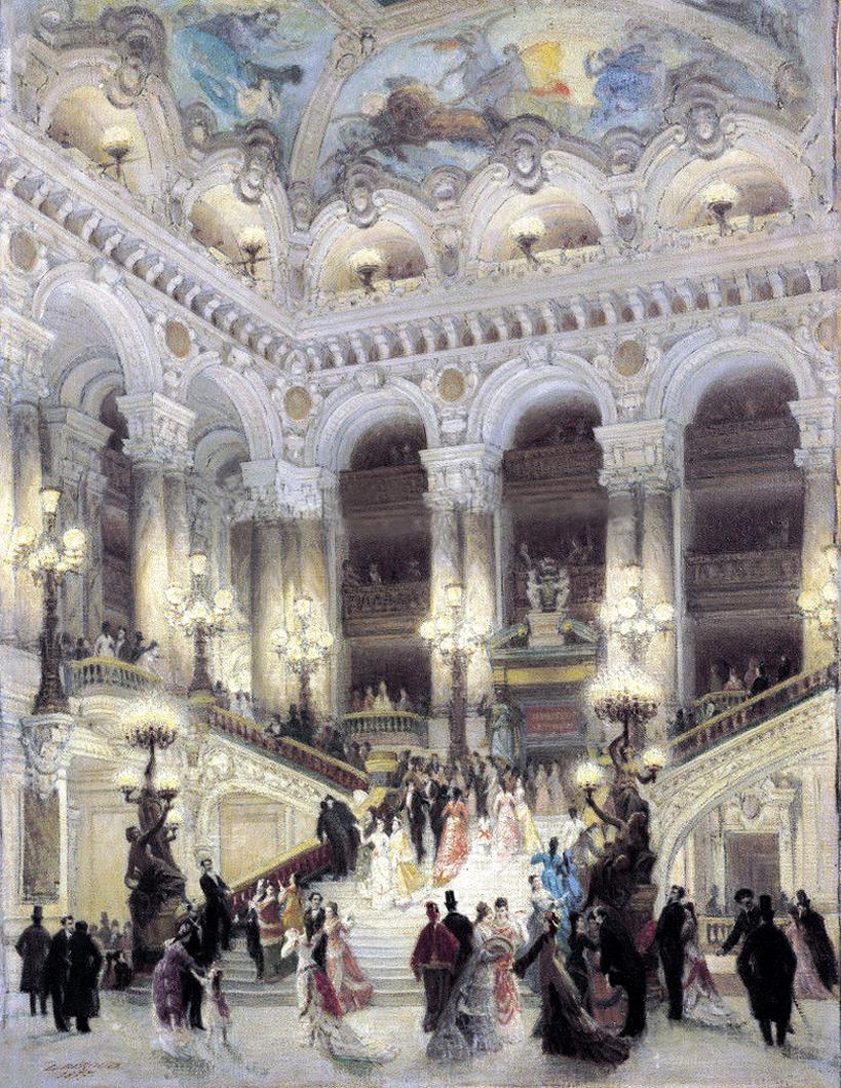
Louis Béroud: L'escalier de l'opéra Garnier, 1877 (Musée Carnavalet)

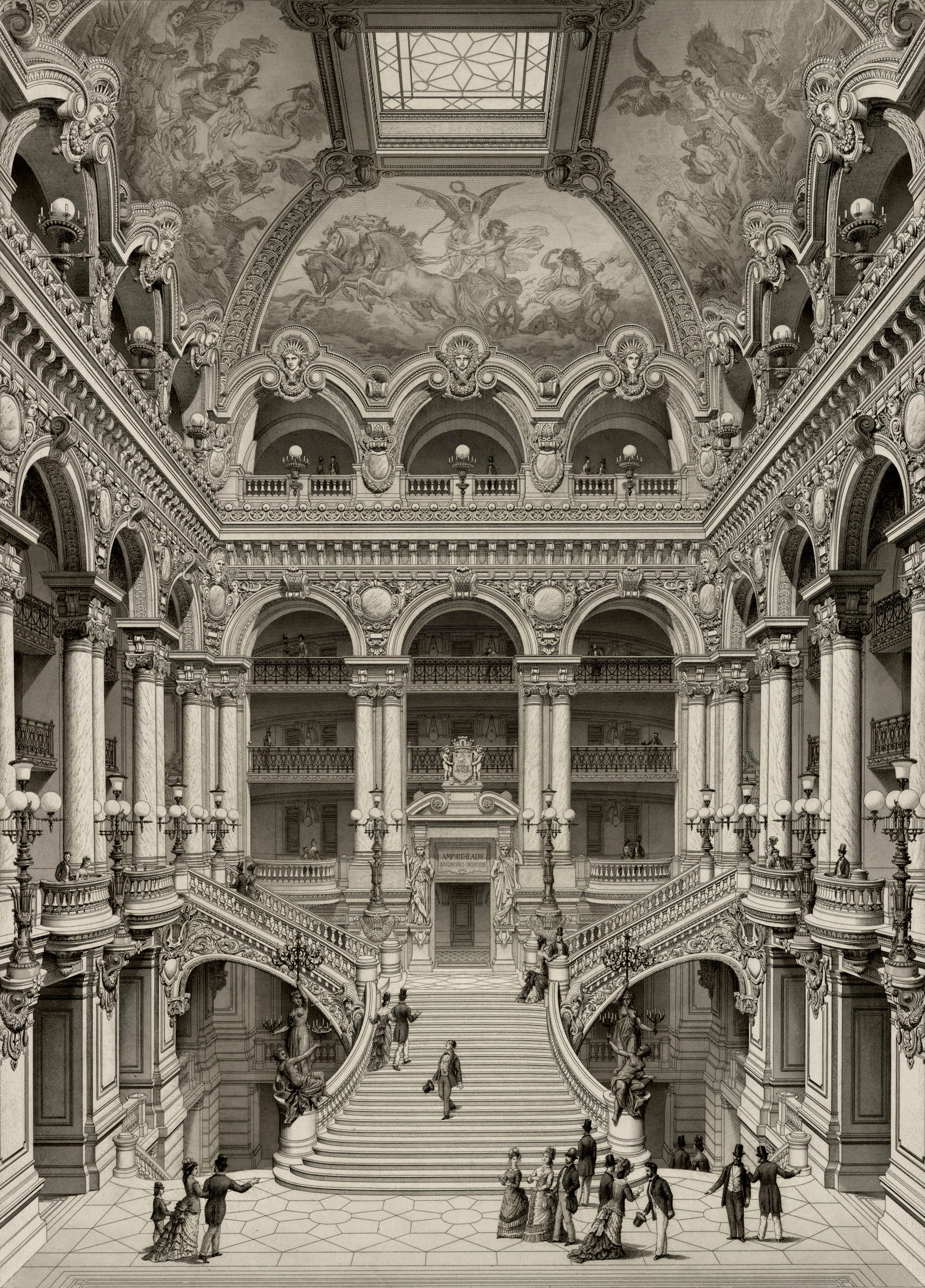
Engraving from Garnier's Nouvel Opéra, 1880

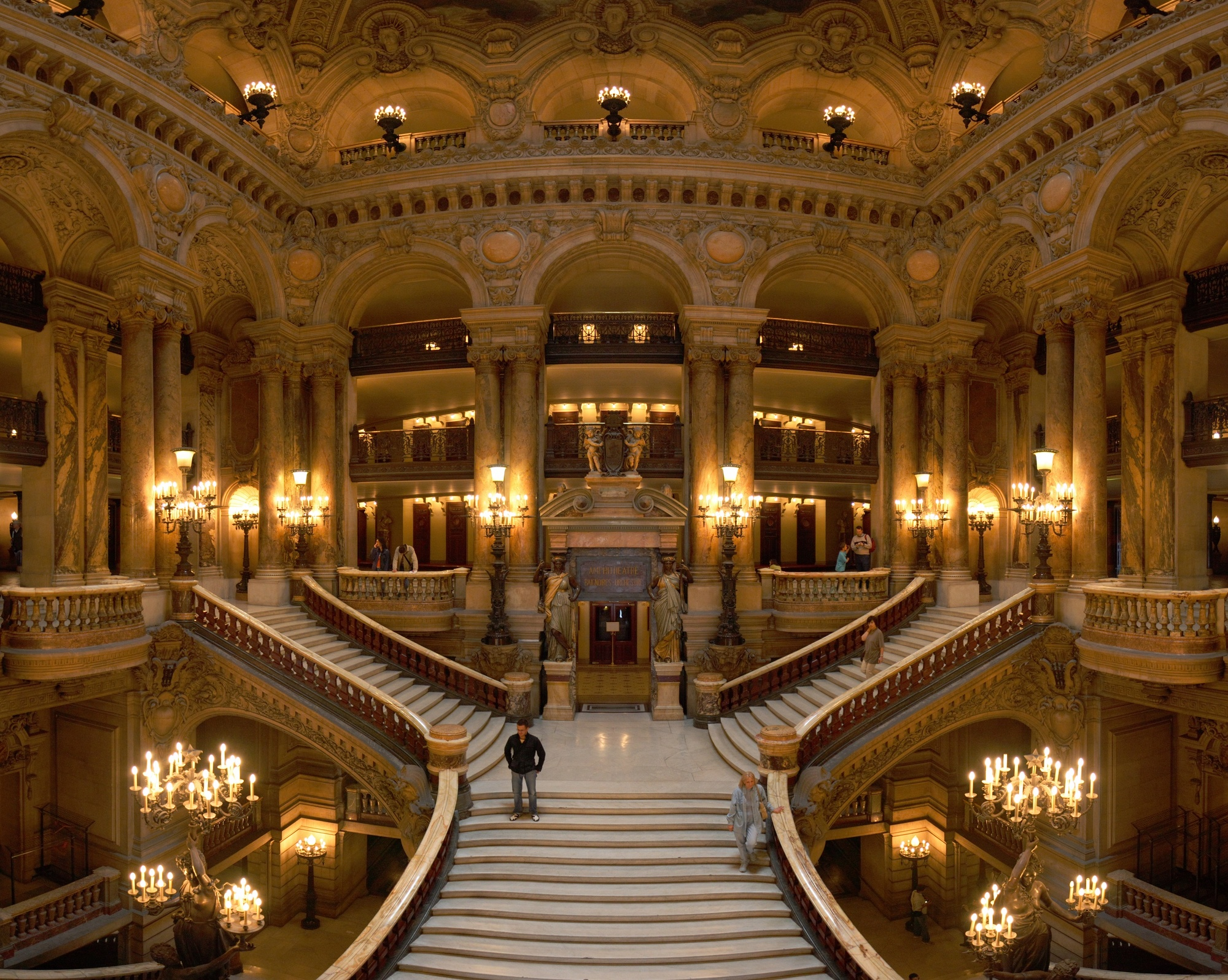
The grand staircase of the Palais Garnier

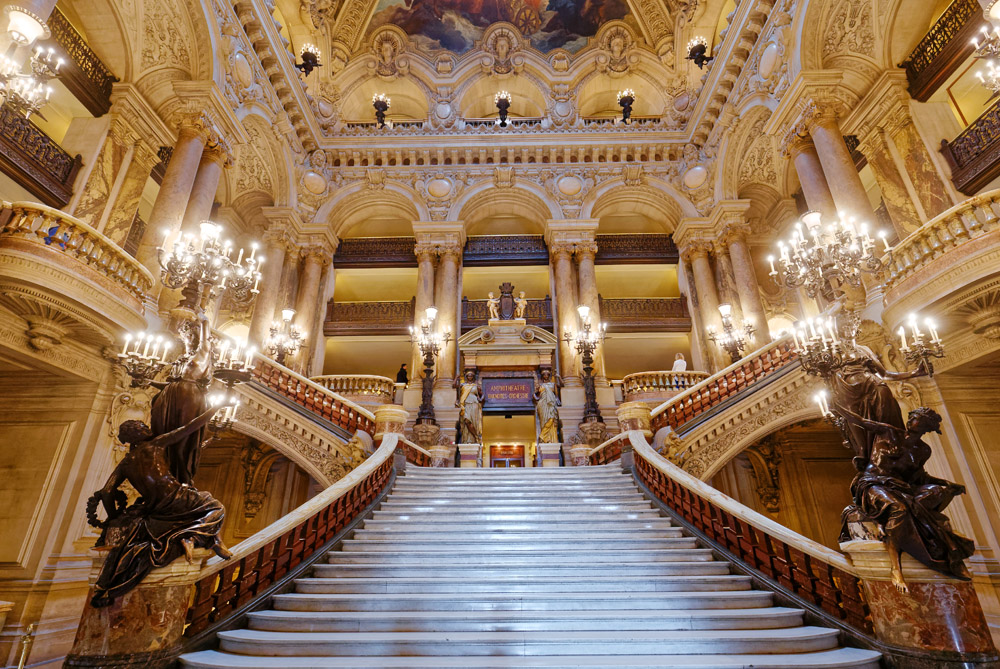
The grand staircase

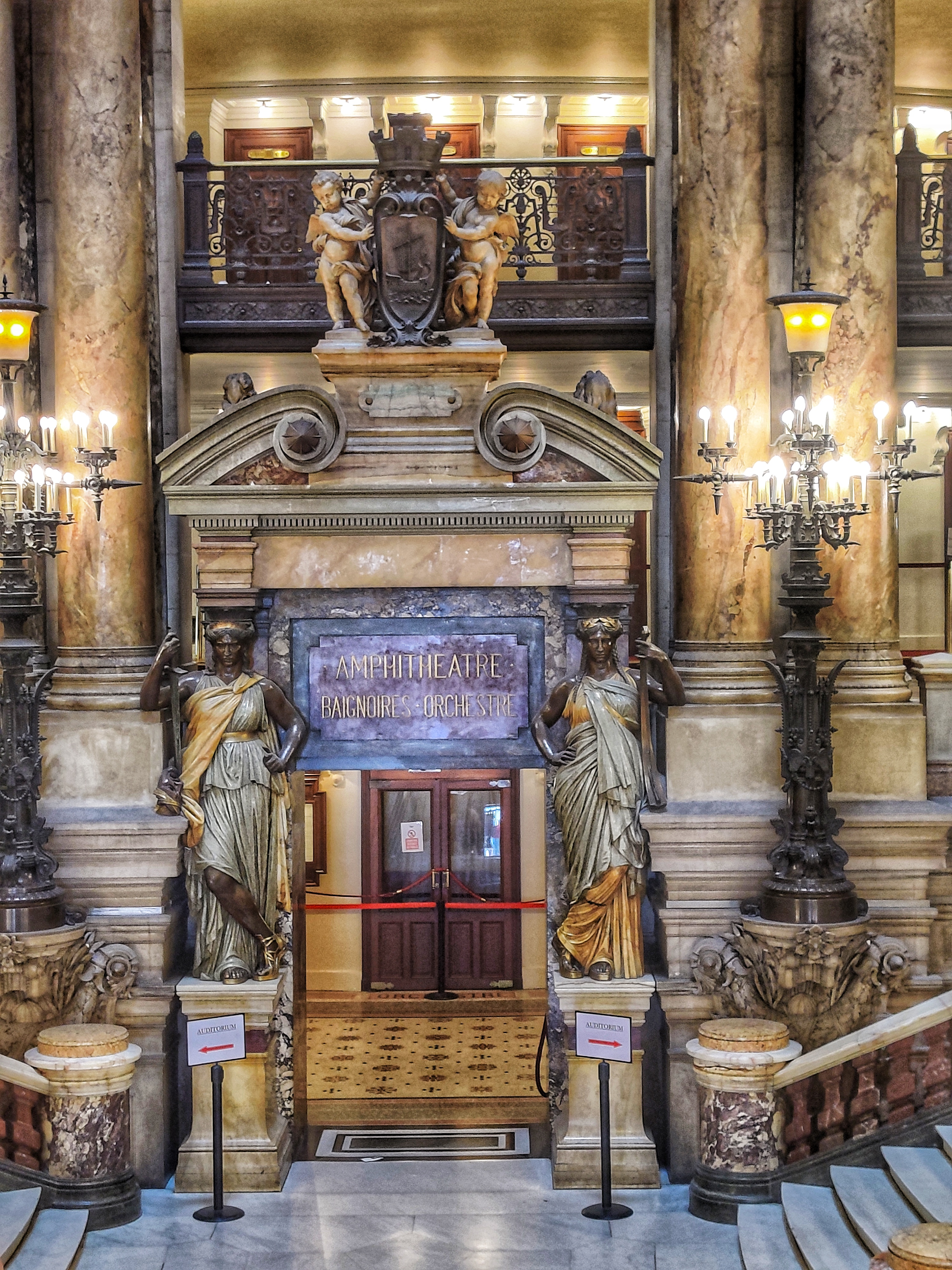
The Amphitheater Entrance. The two caryatids by Jules Thomas. Tragedy with her sword (left) and Comedy with her harp (right).

==== Cave of Pythia ====
At the foot of the Grand staircase, Garnier wanted to place a white marble statue of Orpheus, but there weren't enough funds for this. Then there were talks about moving the La Danse (Carpeaux) from the main façade, but instead Garnier chose the Pythia by Adèle d'Affry (the artist also known by the pseudonym Marcello). There are two bronze lamps on each side of Pythia, made by Jules Corboz. The intrados of the staircase have plant motifs and musical instruments, masks and shells, the artist imagine it as a Nymphaeum.

According to the Greek mythology, Pythia was the priestess of Apollo, the god of arts, and she delivered the oracles of the god. Marcello wanted her Pythia to look different from Pythias of other artists. She wrote: "will be an Indian Pythia, the one whose tongue Alexander set wagging. A kind of gypsy." "A poor woman of a rather strange and bestial type, illuminated by the spirit." She would be like the fortune tellers of India "with tamed snakes curled around their forehand."

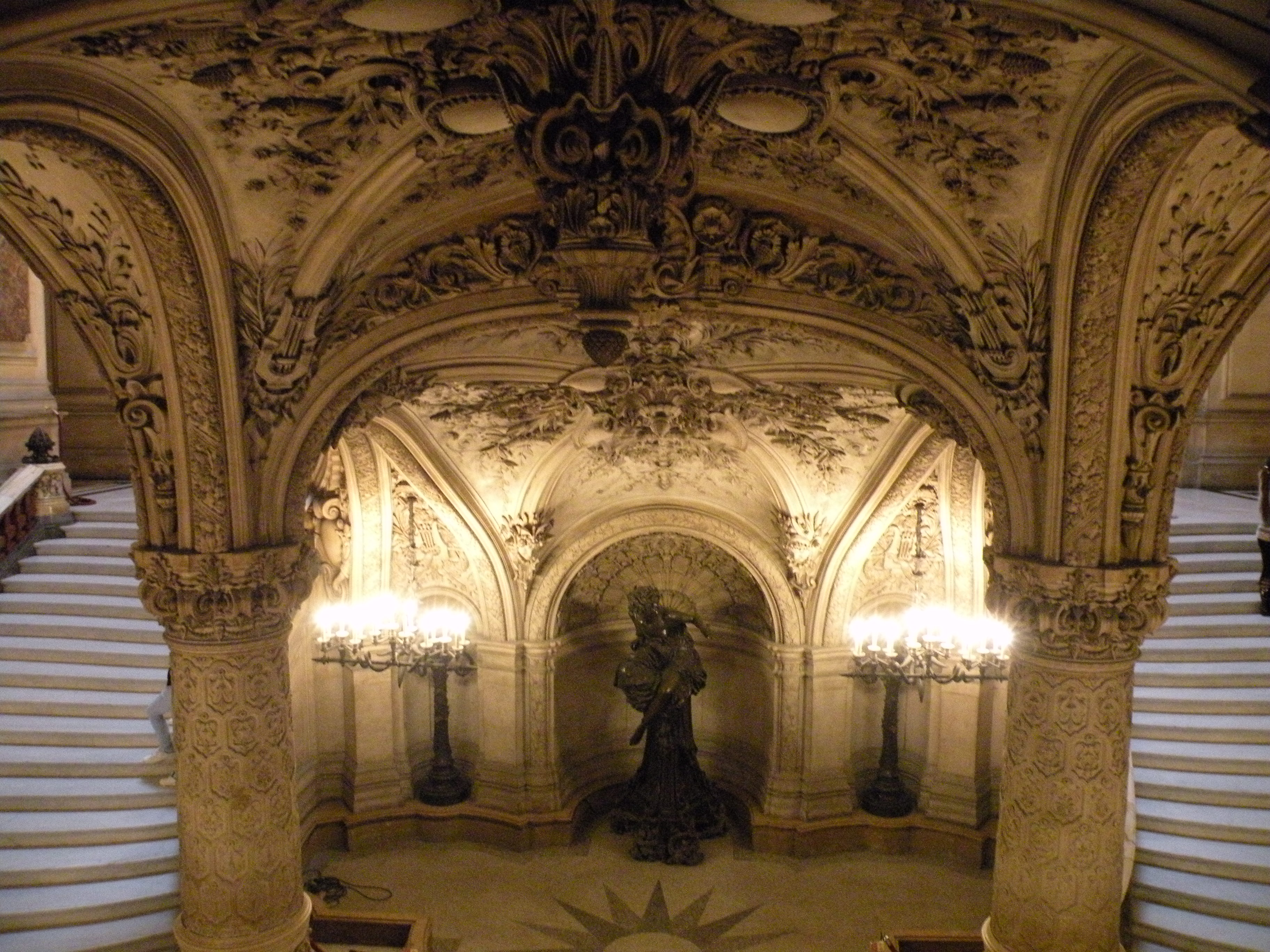

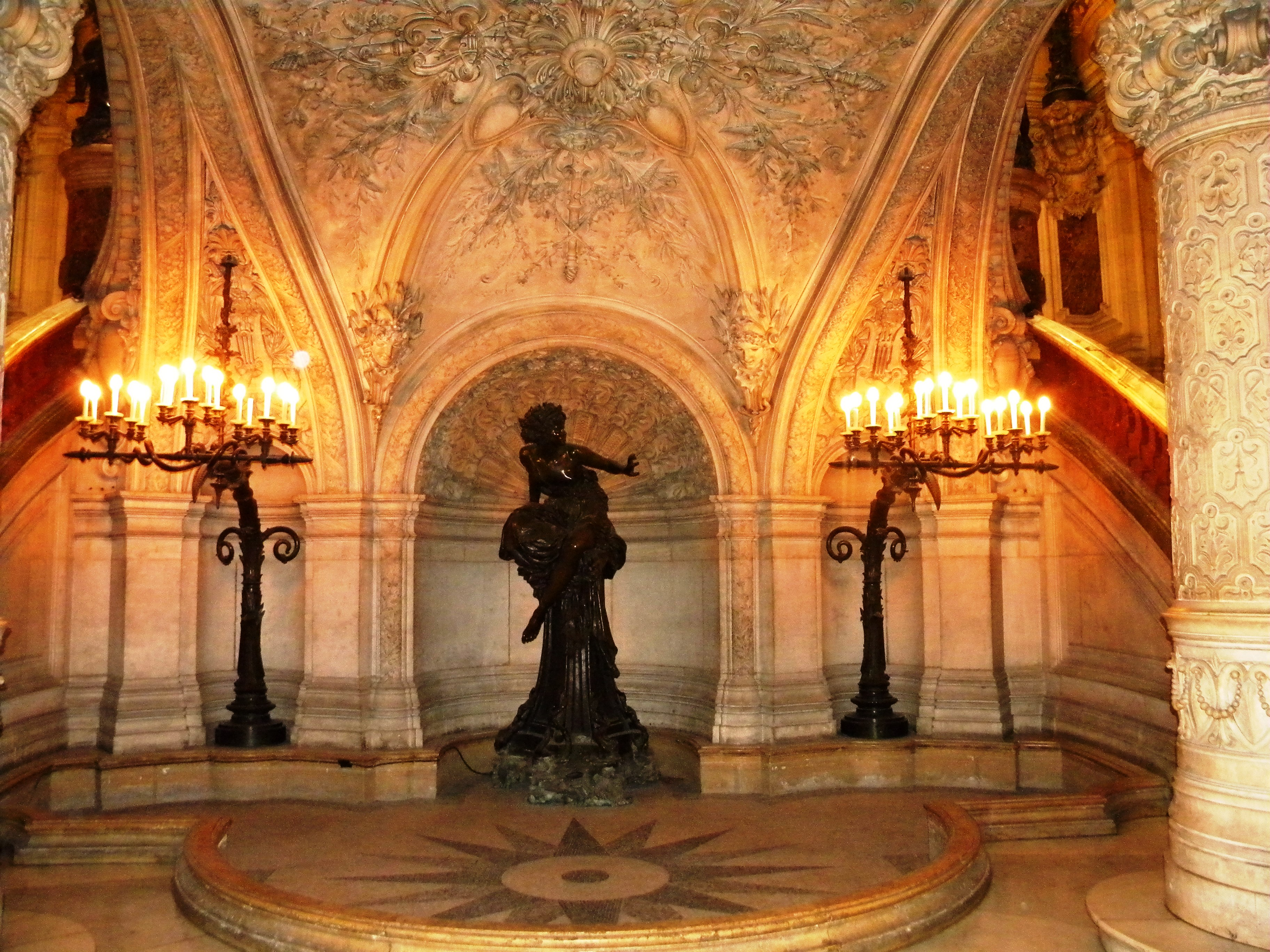

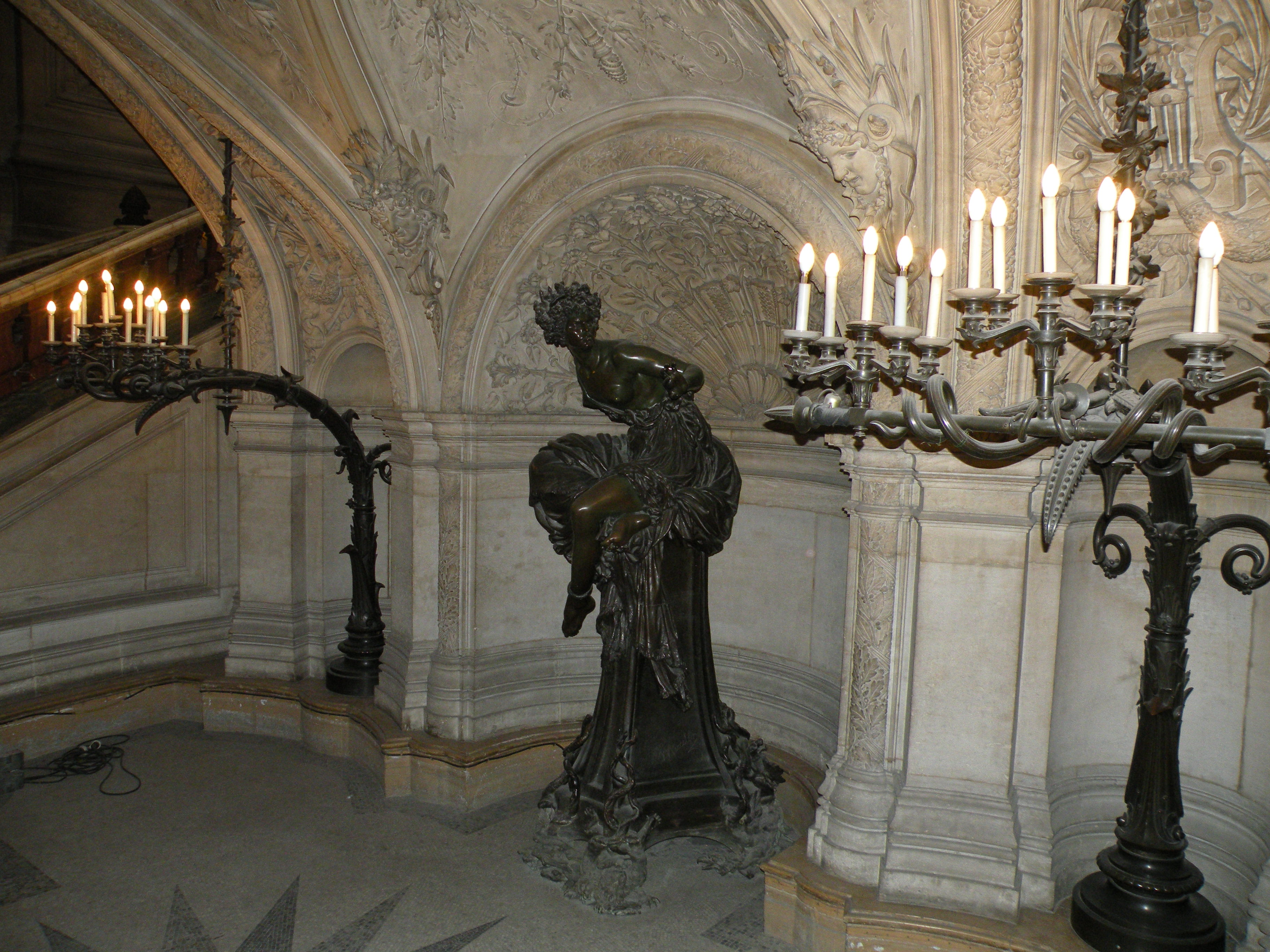

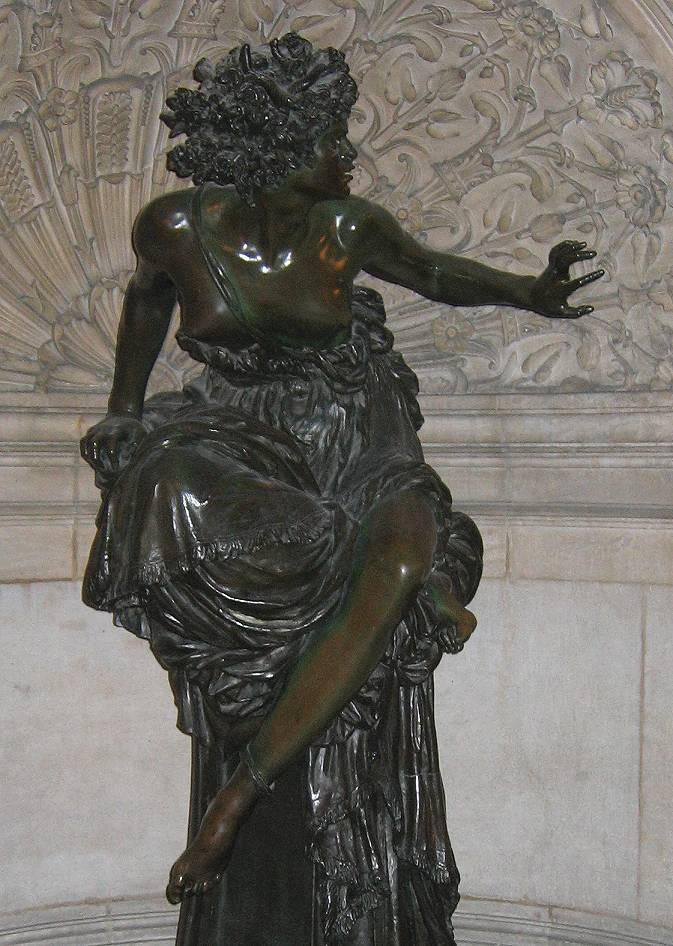

==== Avant foyer or "Foyer of Mosaics" ====
The Avant foyer is twenty meters long with doors leading to an open salon at each end, in the east to the "Sun" and at the west side to the "Moon" salons. At its north it open to the Grand Escalier, while at its south is connected by three monumental doors to the Grand Foyer.

===== Chandeliers =====
The Avant Foyer is lit by five big chandeliers designed by Charles Garnier in Byzantine style.

===== Greek mosaic inscriptions =====
There are two Greek mosaic inscription, written in the 8th century Byzantine style letters (Greek uncial), which read:

"Decorative mosaic was applied for the first time in France to the ornamentation of this vault and the popularisation of this art." (Greek inscription 1)

"The figures painted by Curzon, were executed by Salviati, the ornaments by Facchina. The architecture is by Charles Garnier." (Greek inscription 2)

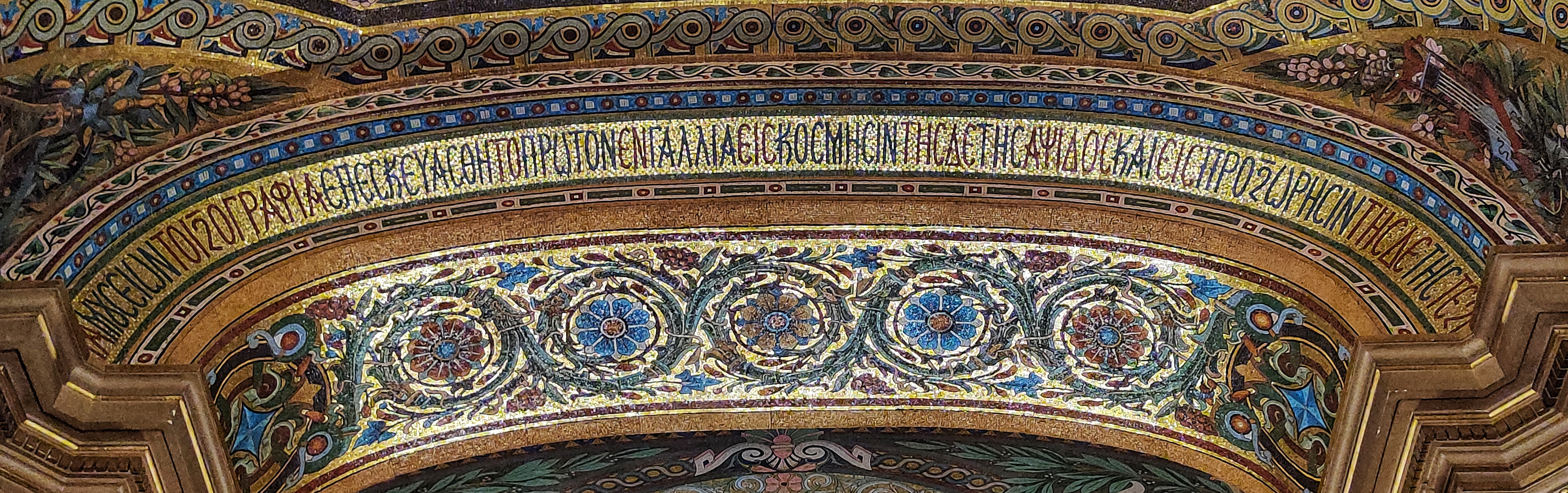
Greek inscription 1

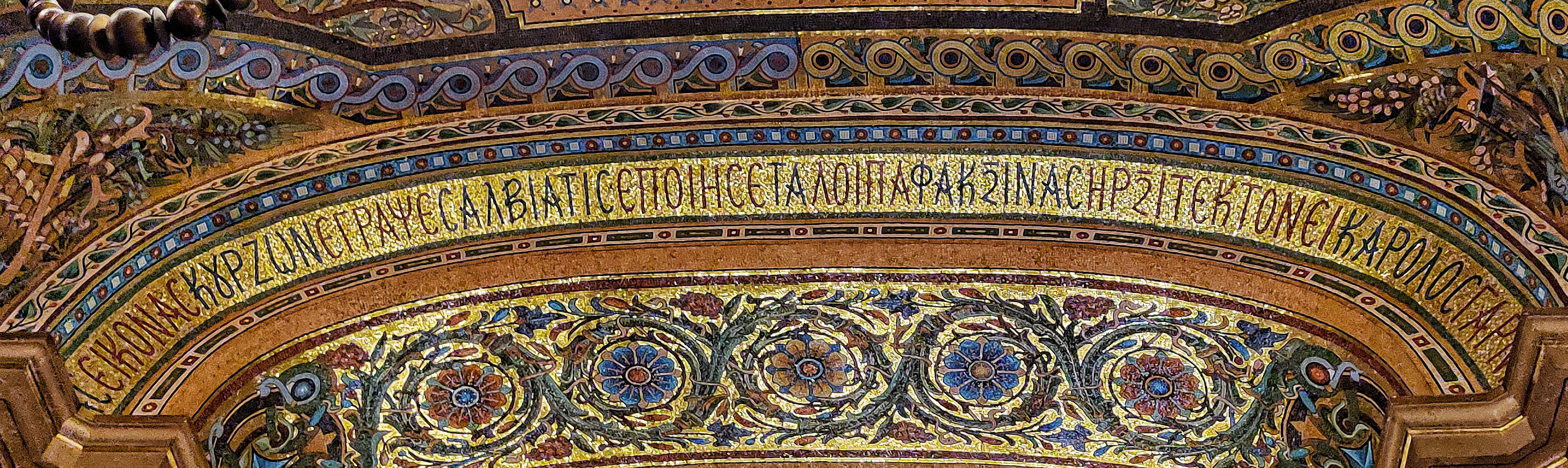
Greek inscription 2

===== The four pair mosaic panels =====
The mosaic represent four couples from the Greek mythology (Hermes and Psyche, Artemis and Endymion, Orpheus and Eurydice, Eos and Cephalus). In two of the panels the scenes are more erotic (Artemis – Endymion, Eos – Cephalus), while the other two depict the couples leaving the underworld and are more about death than love (Hermes – Psyche, Orpheus – Eurydice). The themes of death and love alternate.

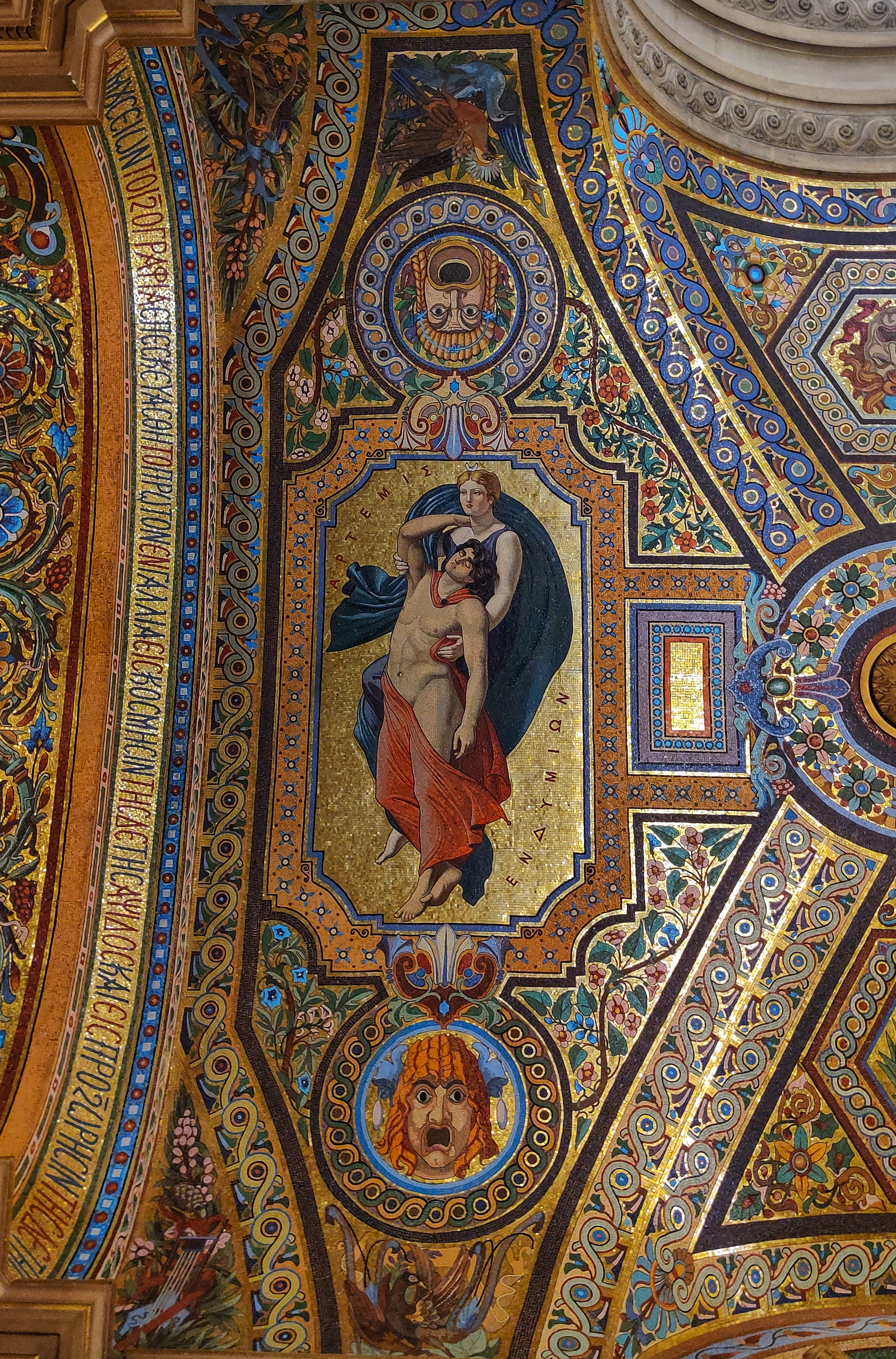
Artemis and Endymion. Their names are in Greek, ΑΡΤΕΜΙΣ (Artemis) and ΕΝΔΥΜΙΩΝ (Endymion).

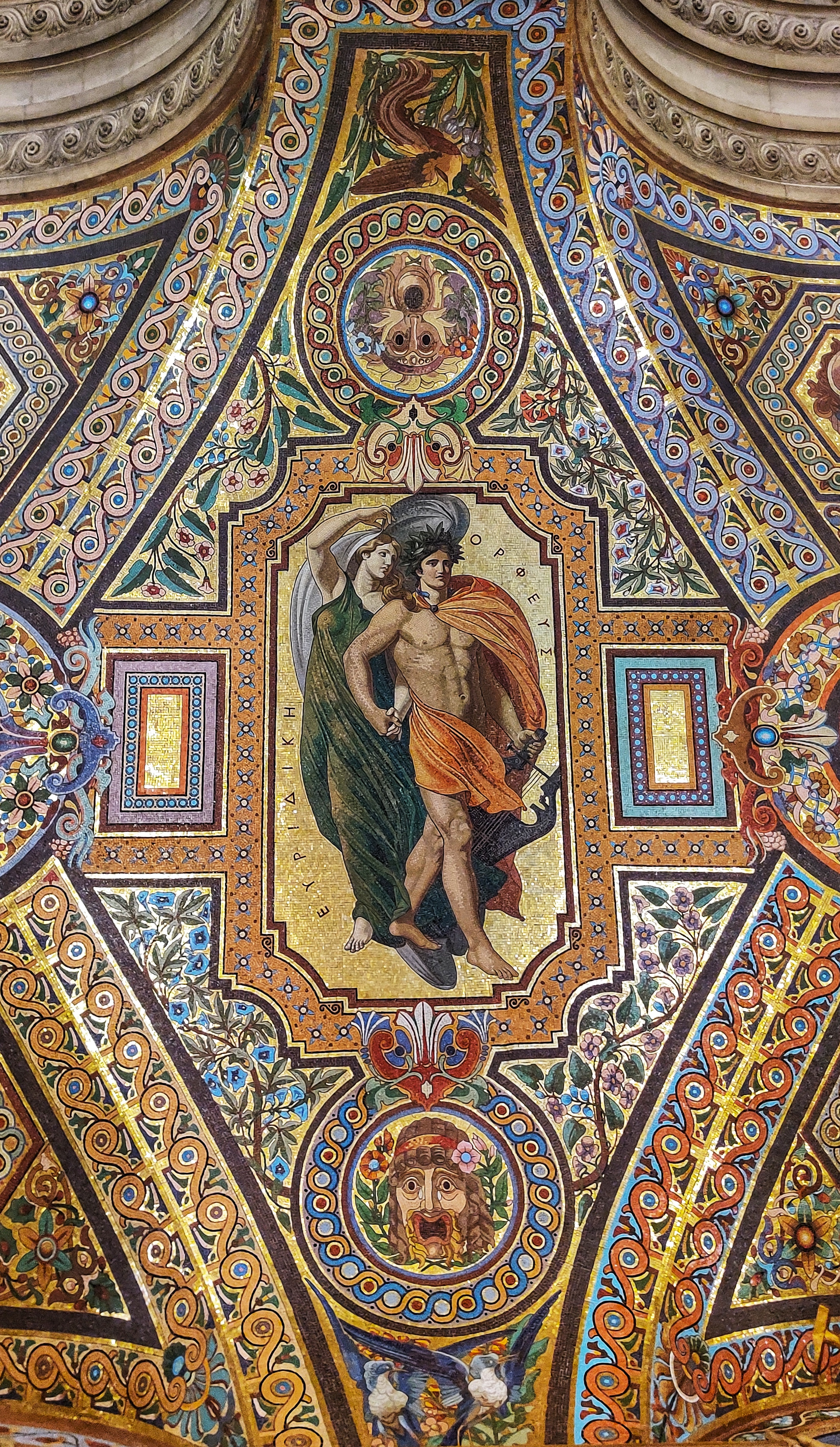
Orpheus and Eurydice. Their names are in Greek, ΟΡΦΕΥΣ (Orheus) and ΕΥΡΥΔΙΚΗ (Eurydice).

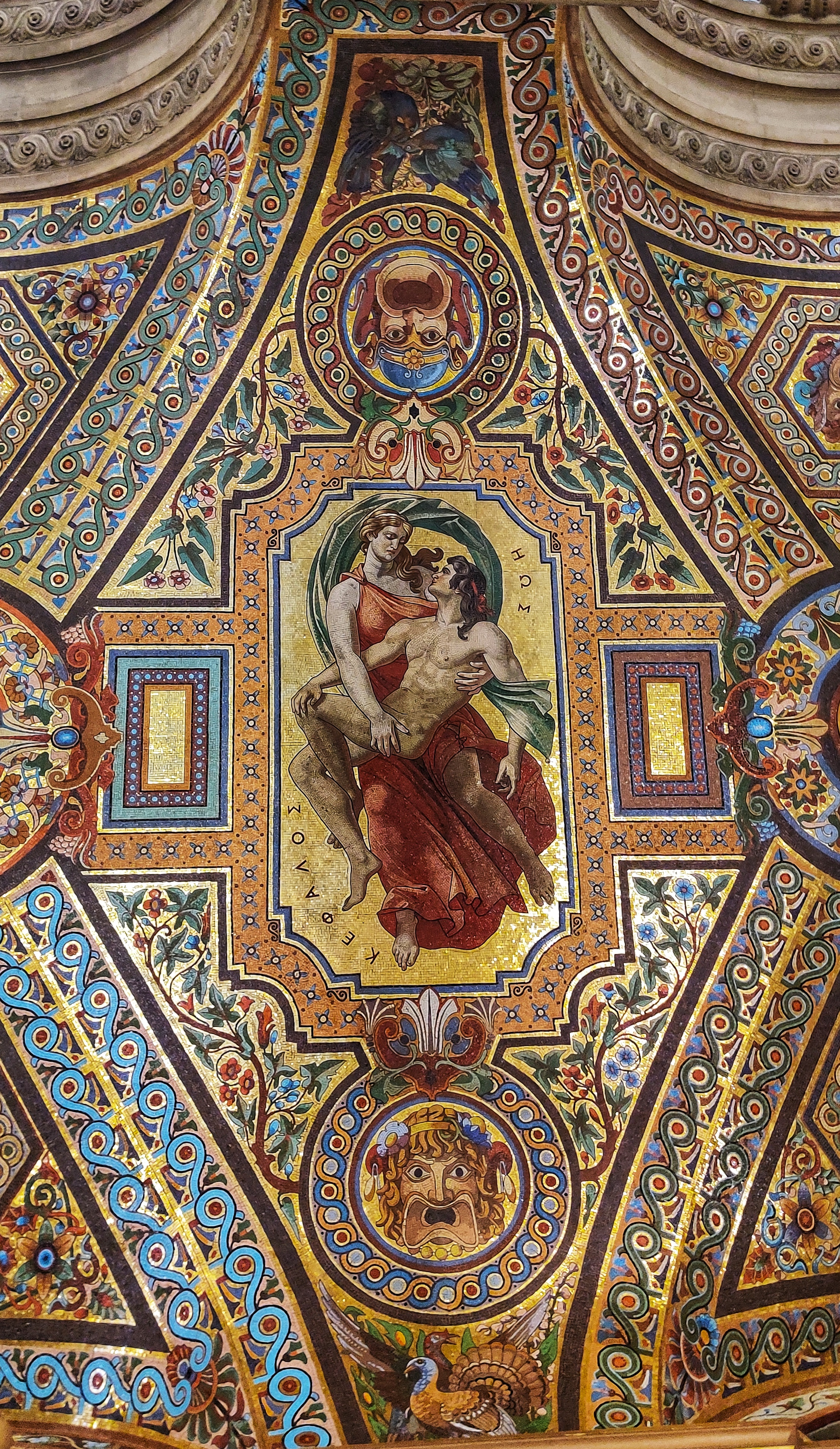
Eos and Cephalus. Their names are in Greek, ΗΩΣ (Eos) and ΚΕΦΑΛΟΣ (Cephalus).

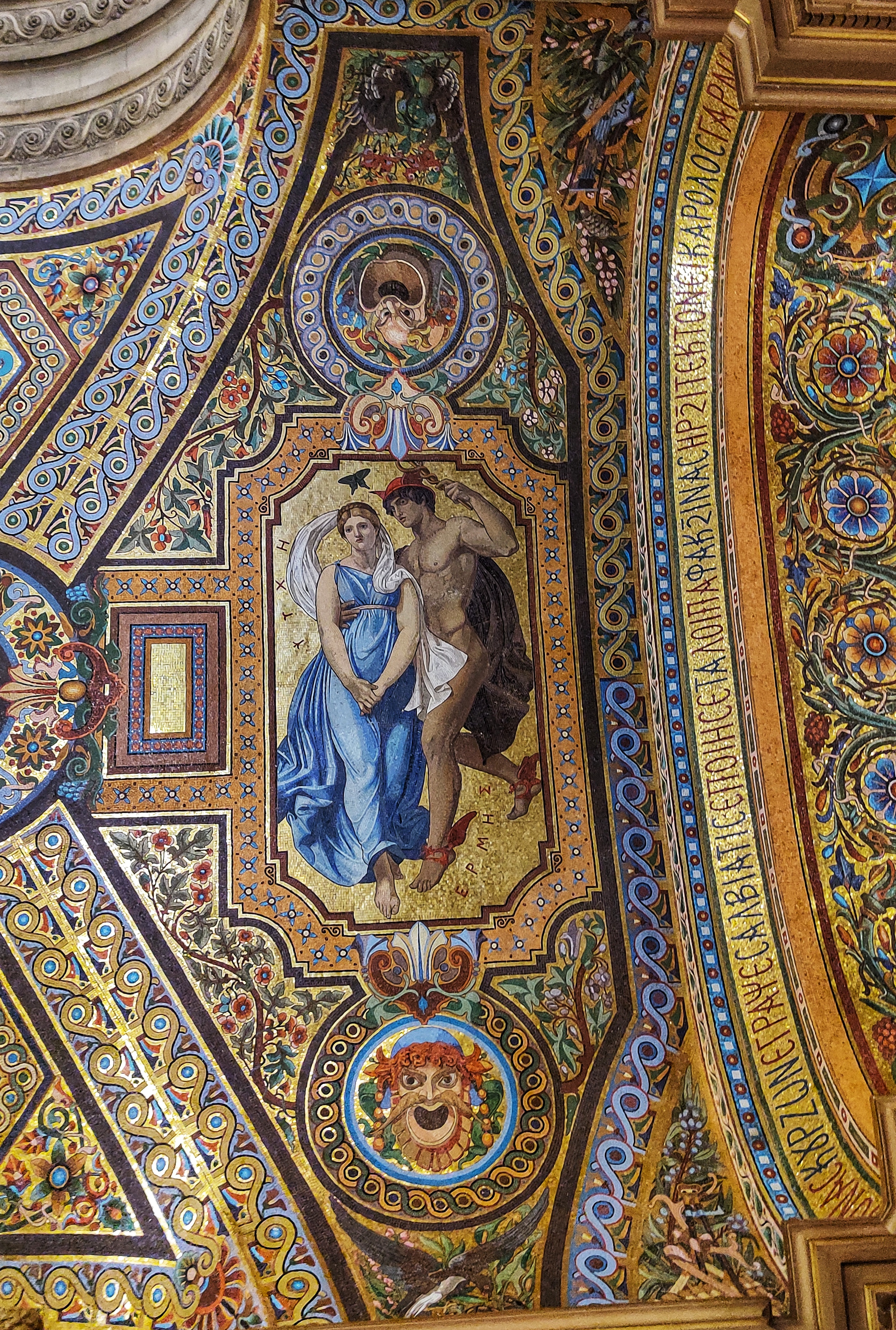
Hermes and Psyche. Their names are in Greek, ΨΥΧΗ (Psyche) and ΕΡΜΗΣ (Hermes). Above Psyche's head there is a butterfly.

The decoration framing the mosaic panels with the mythological couples include theatrical masks, musical instruments, birds, all surrounded by flowers, fruits and gold.

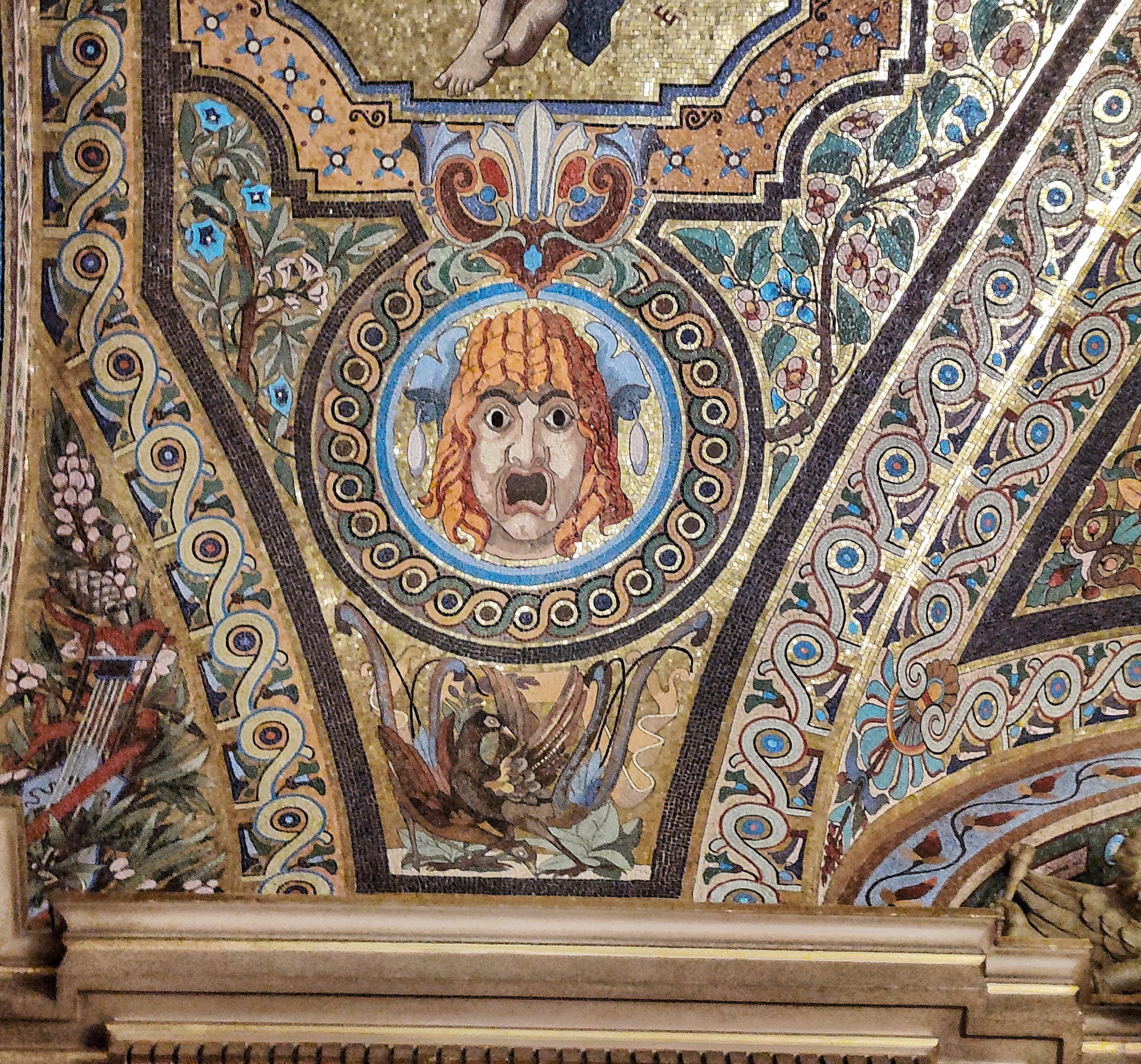

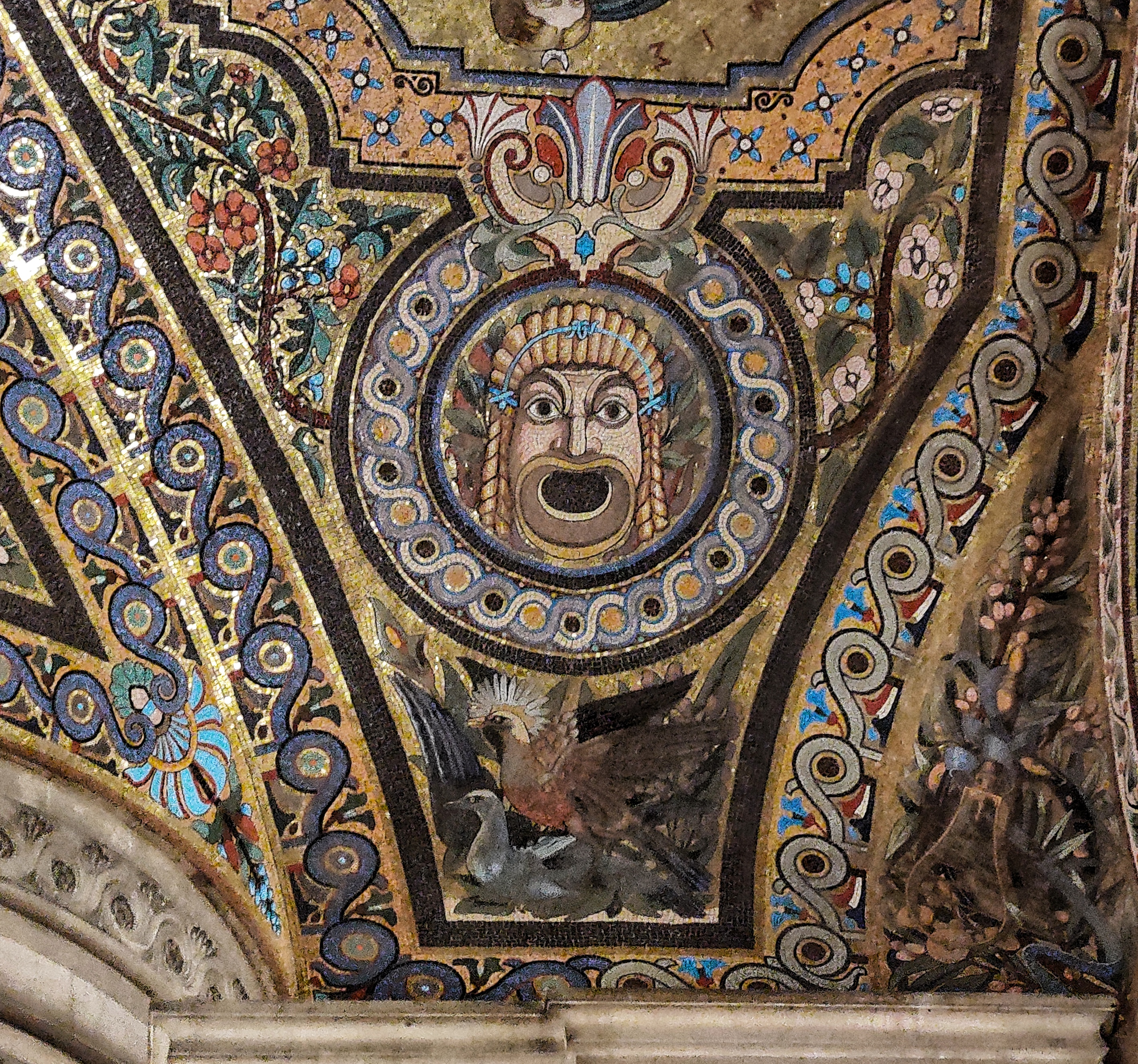

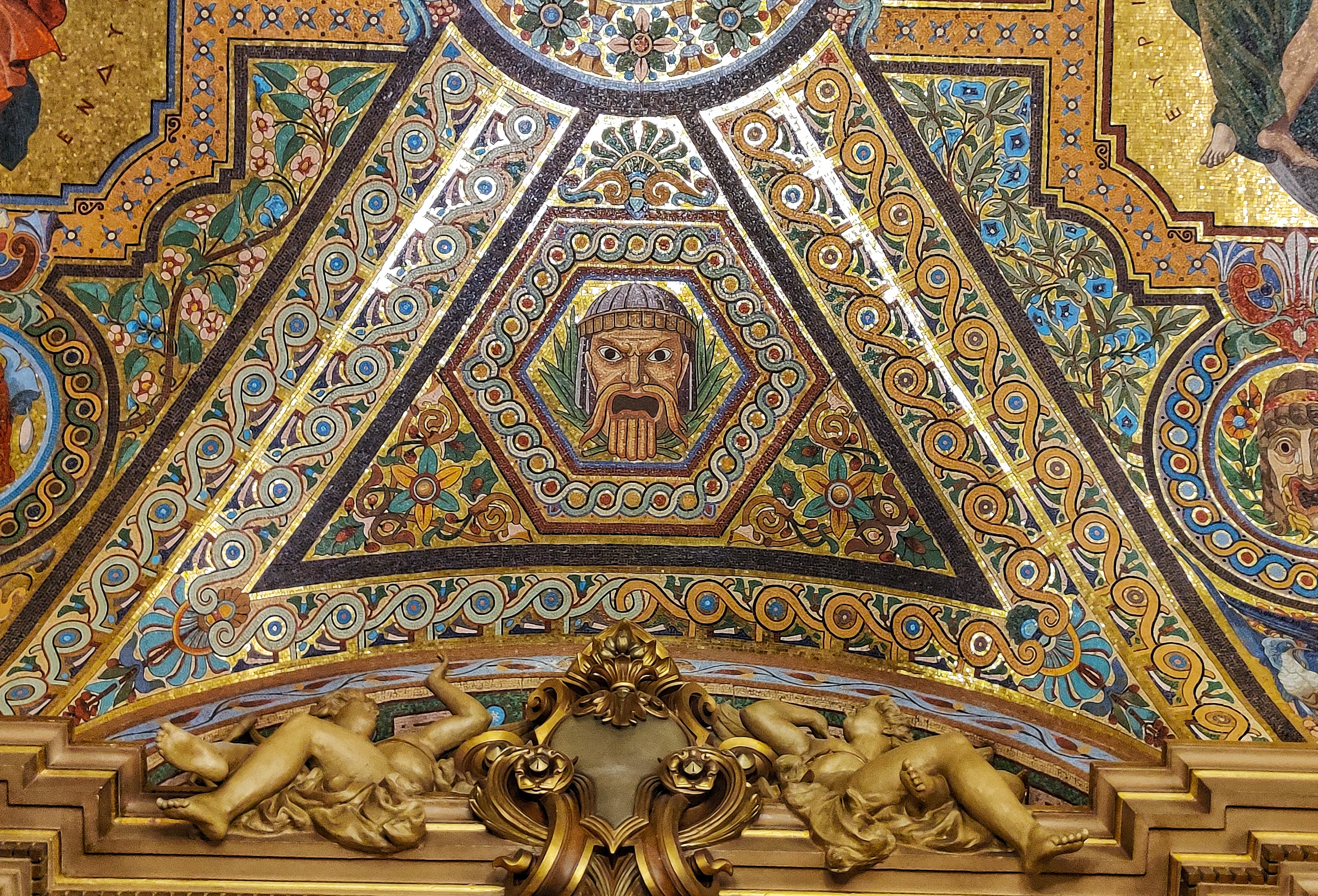

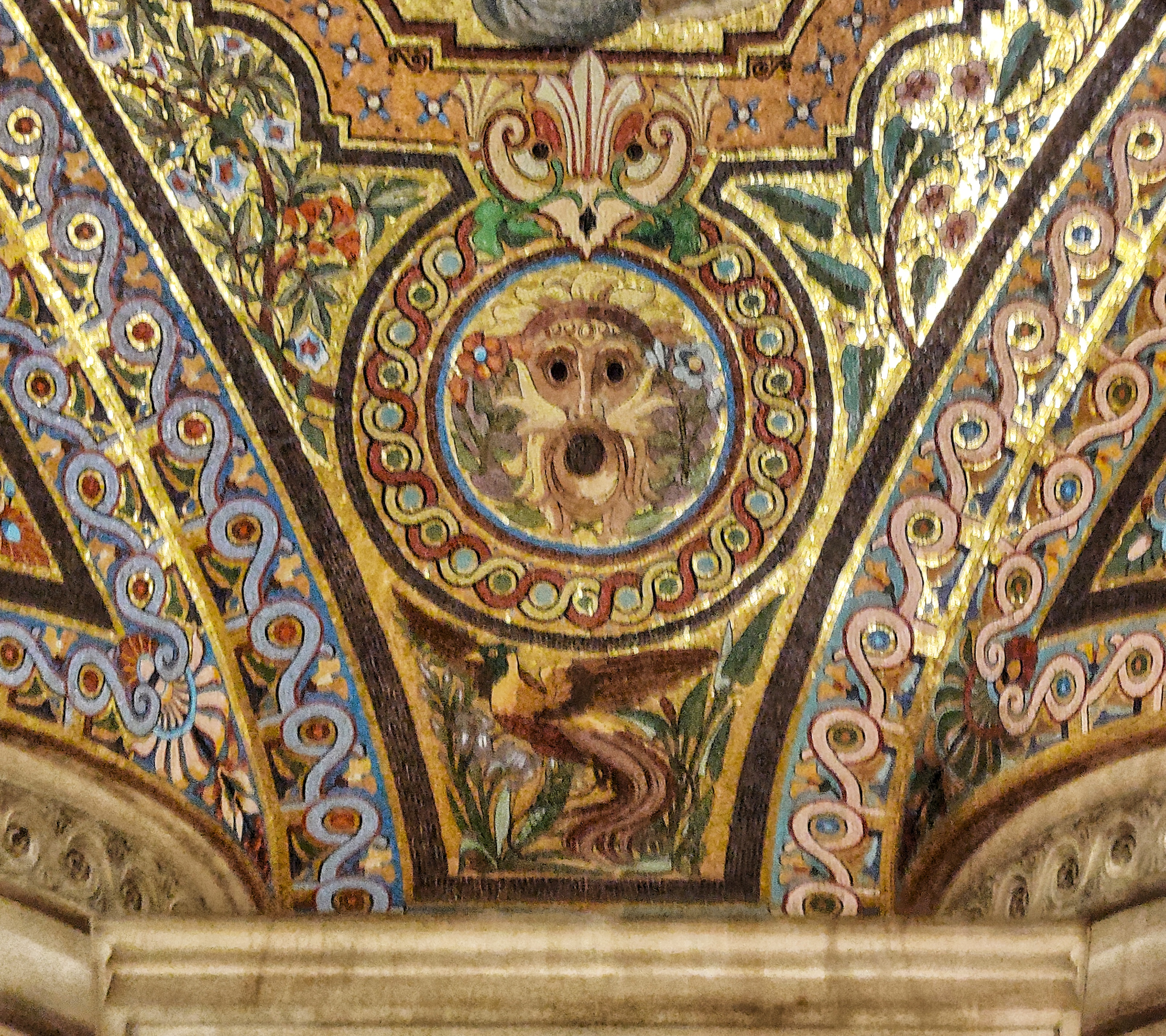

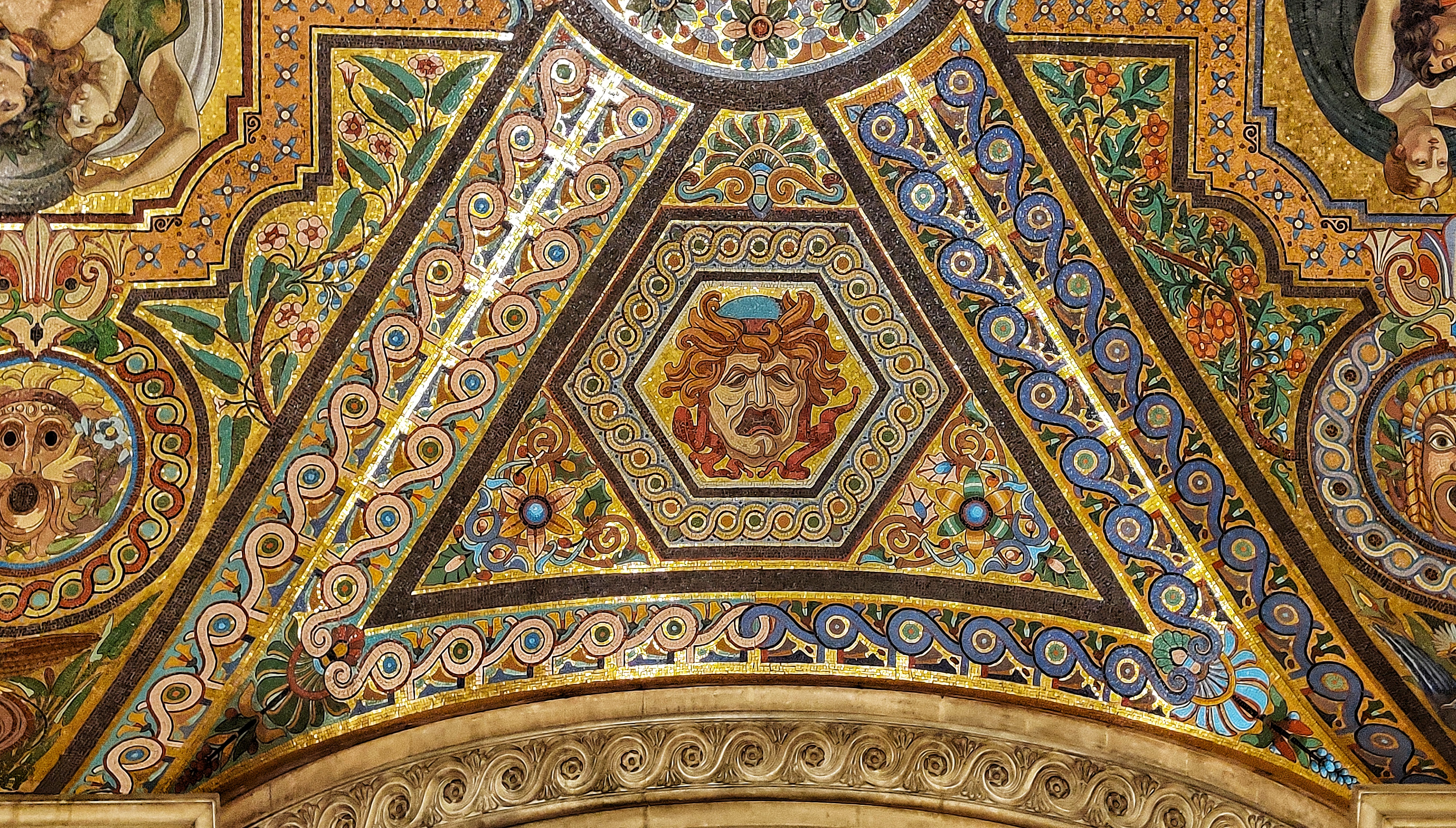

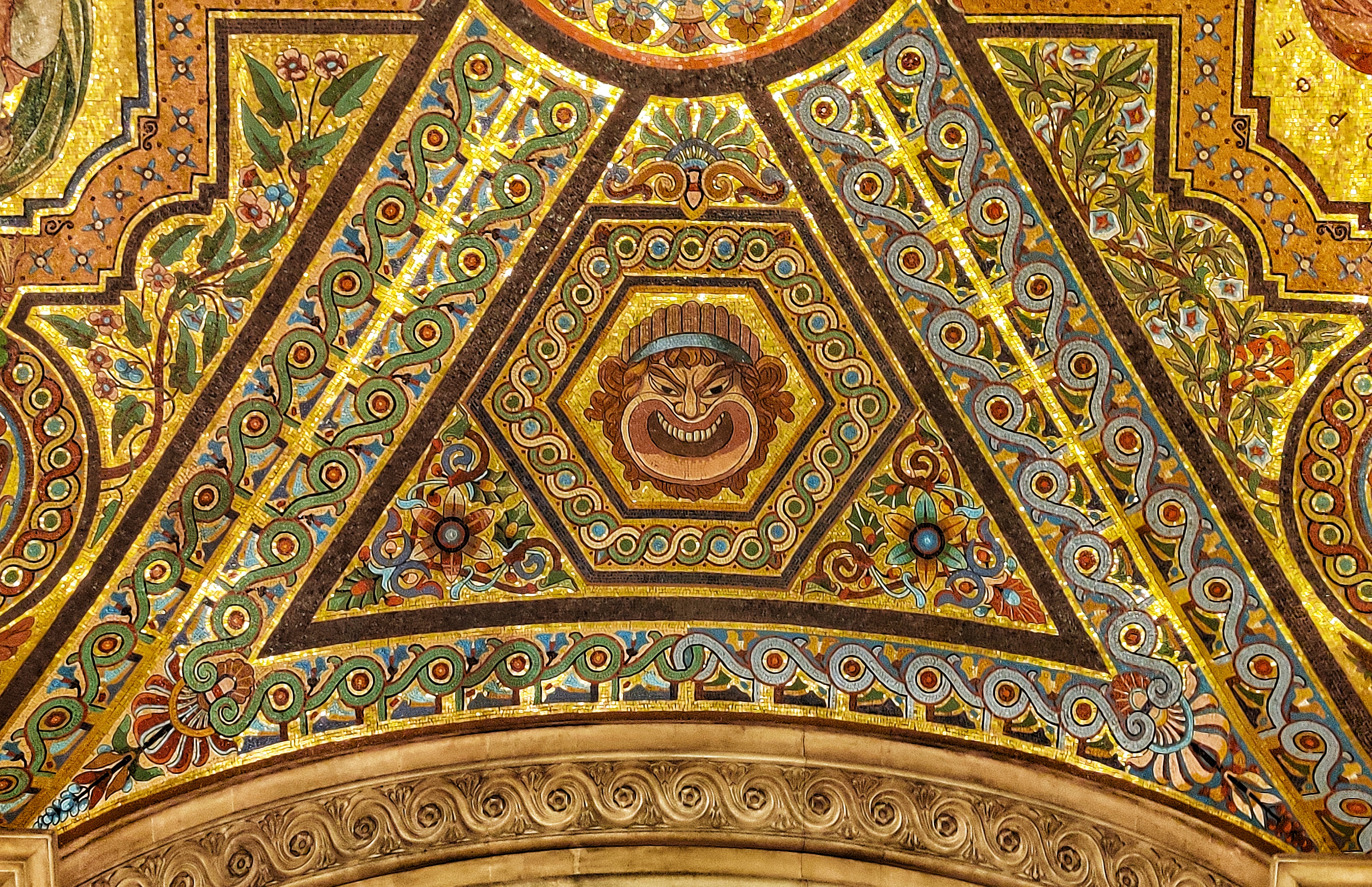

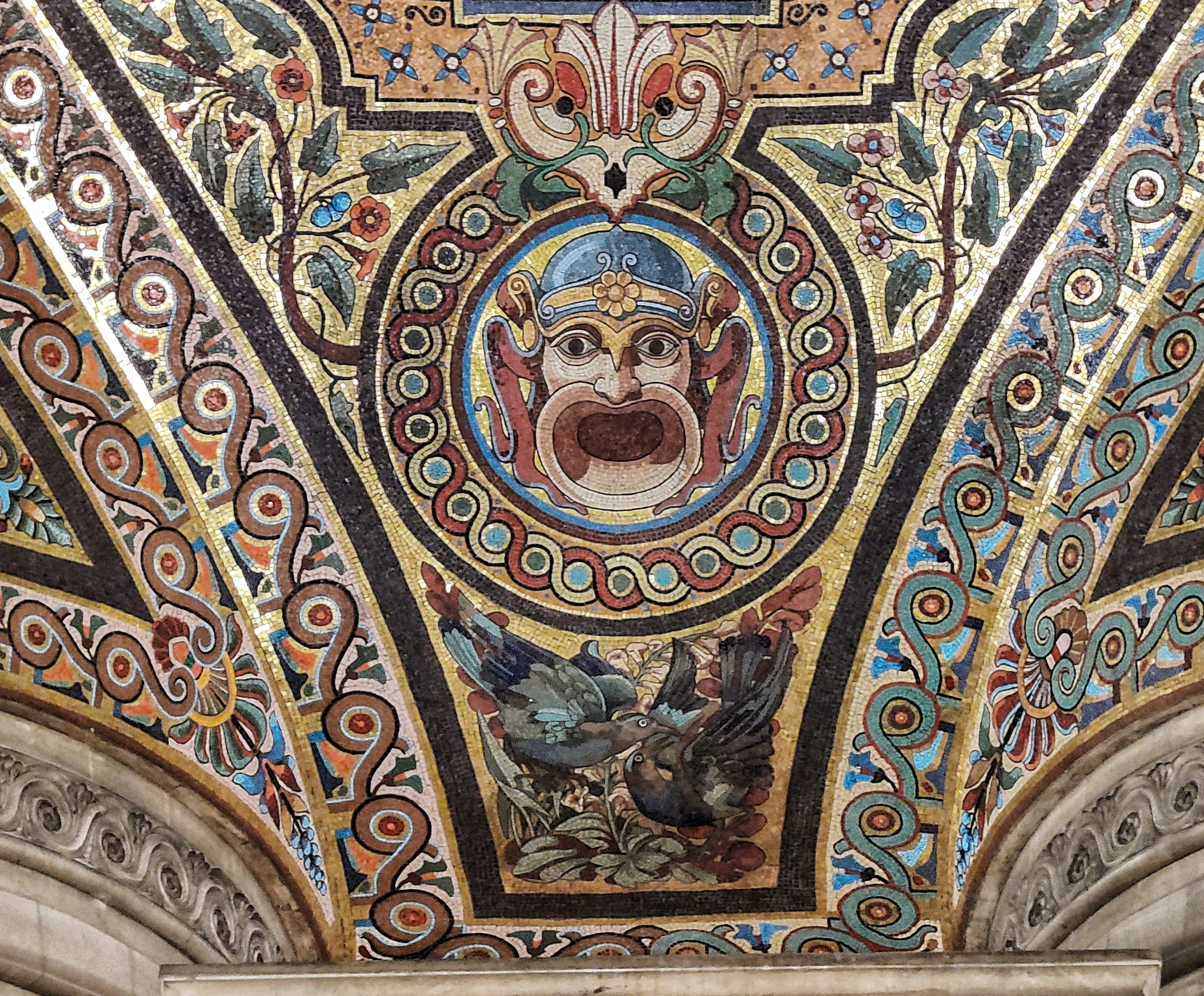

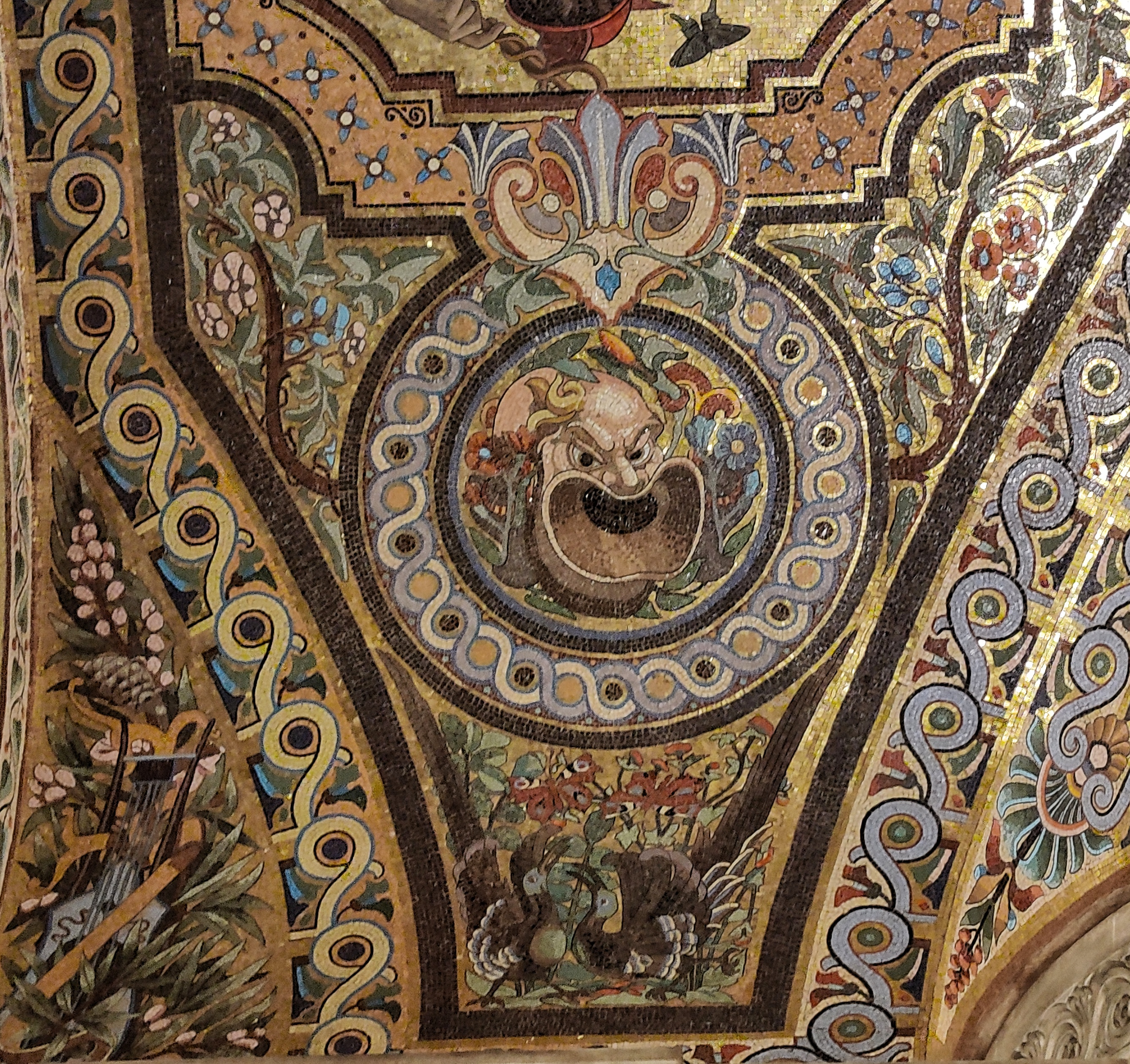

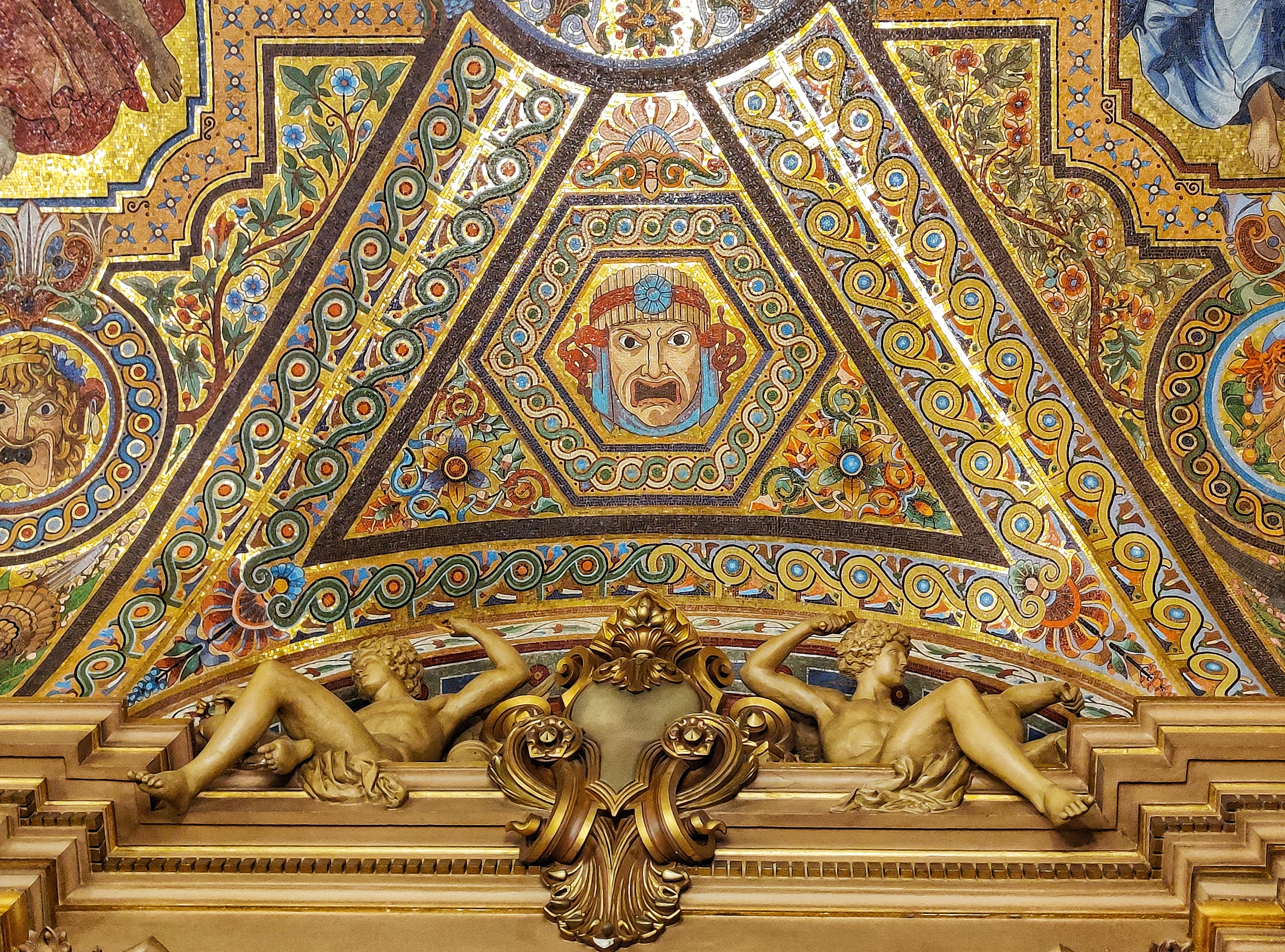

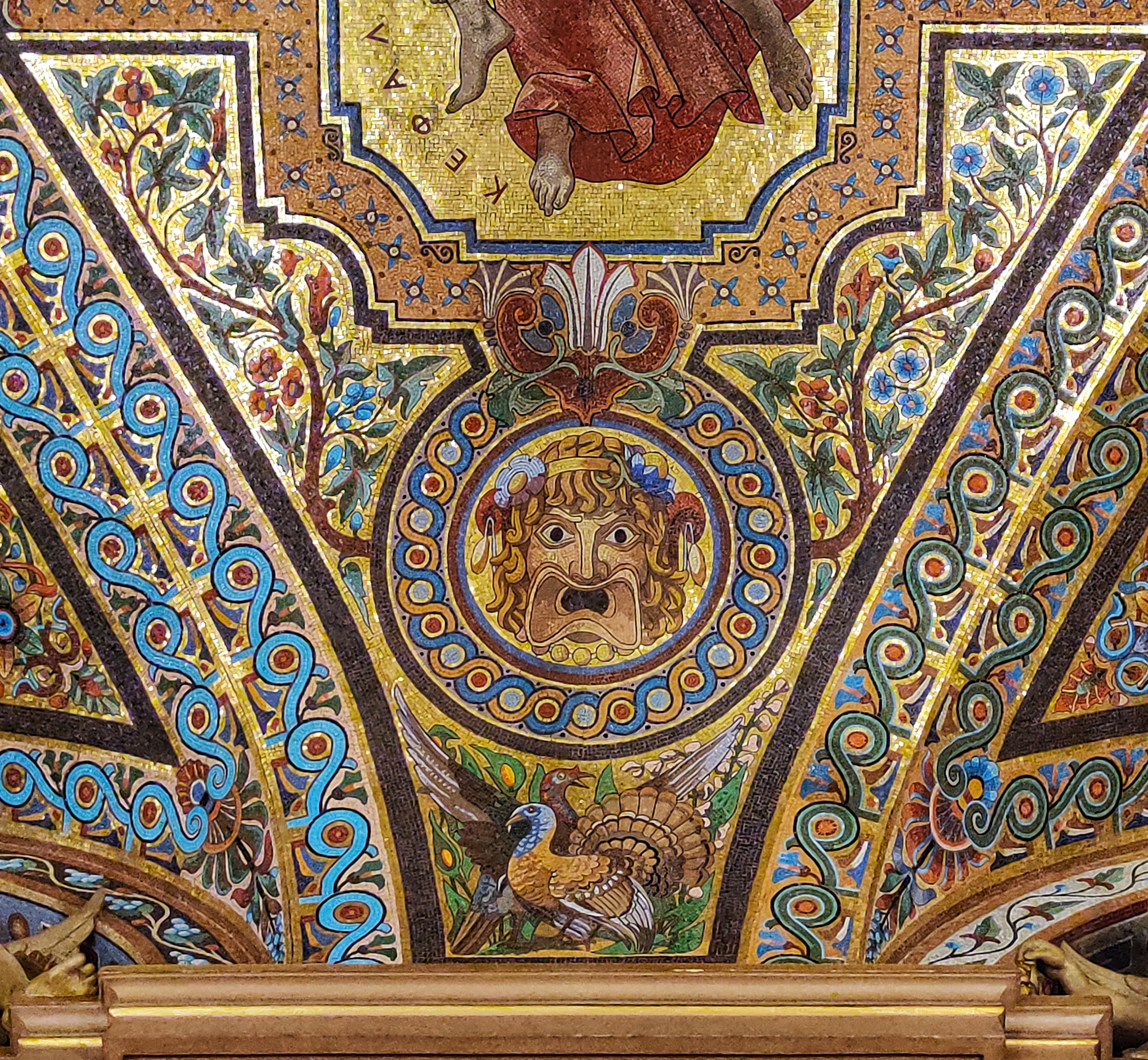

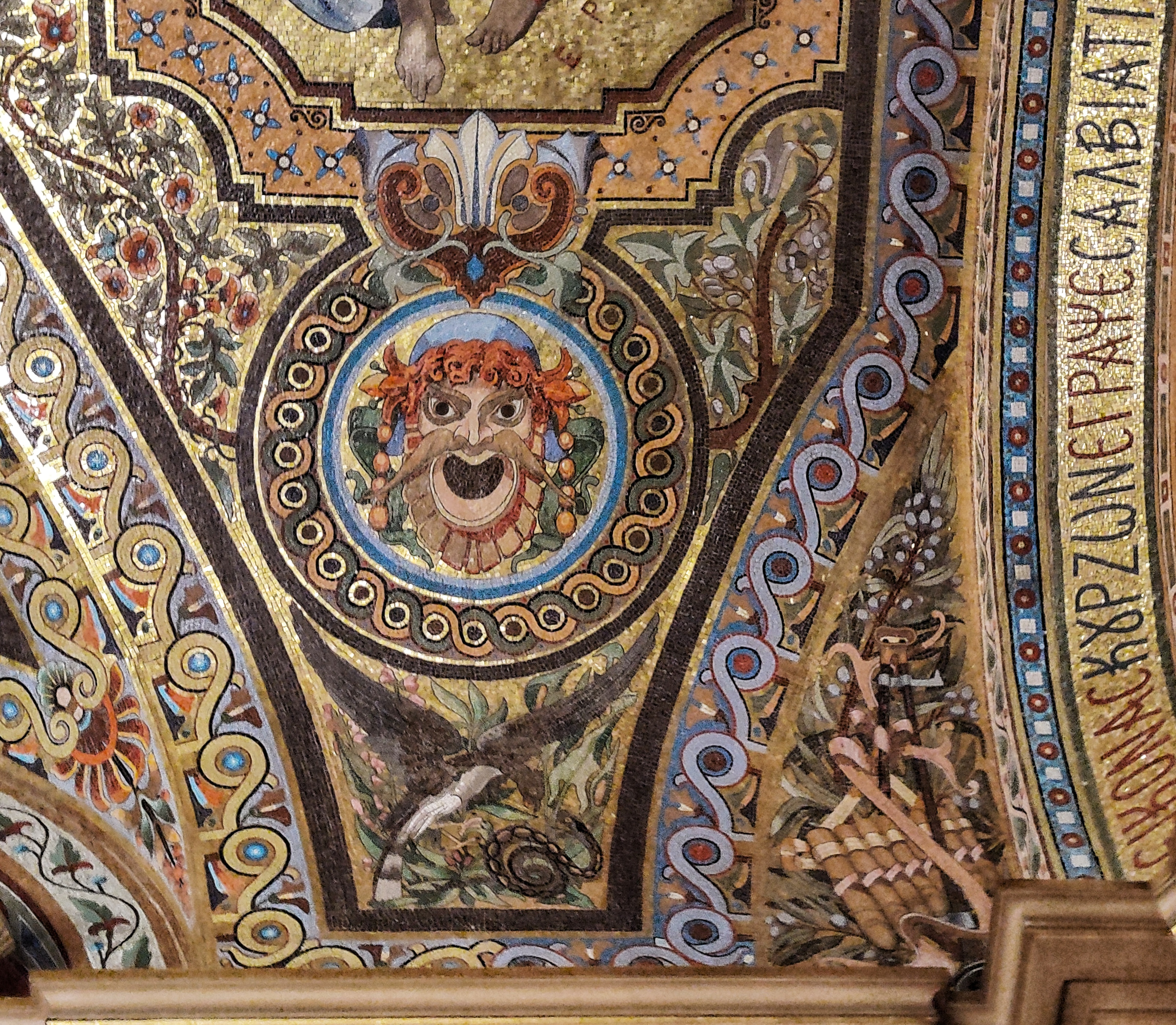

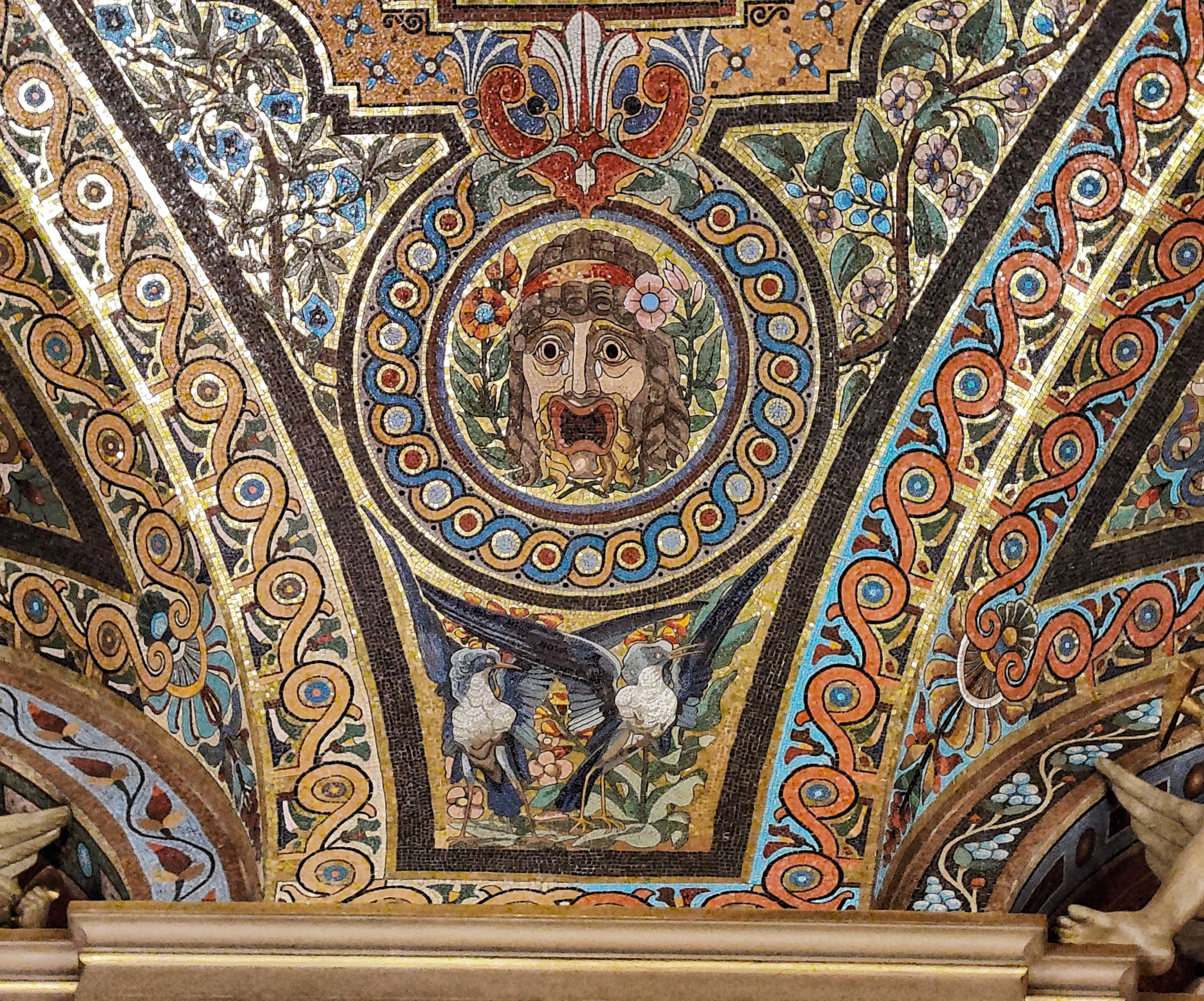

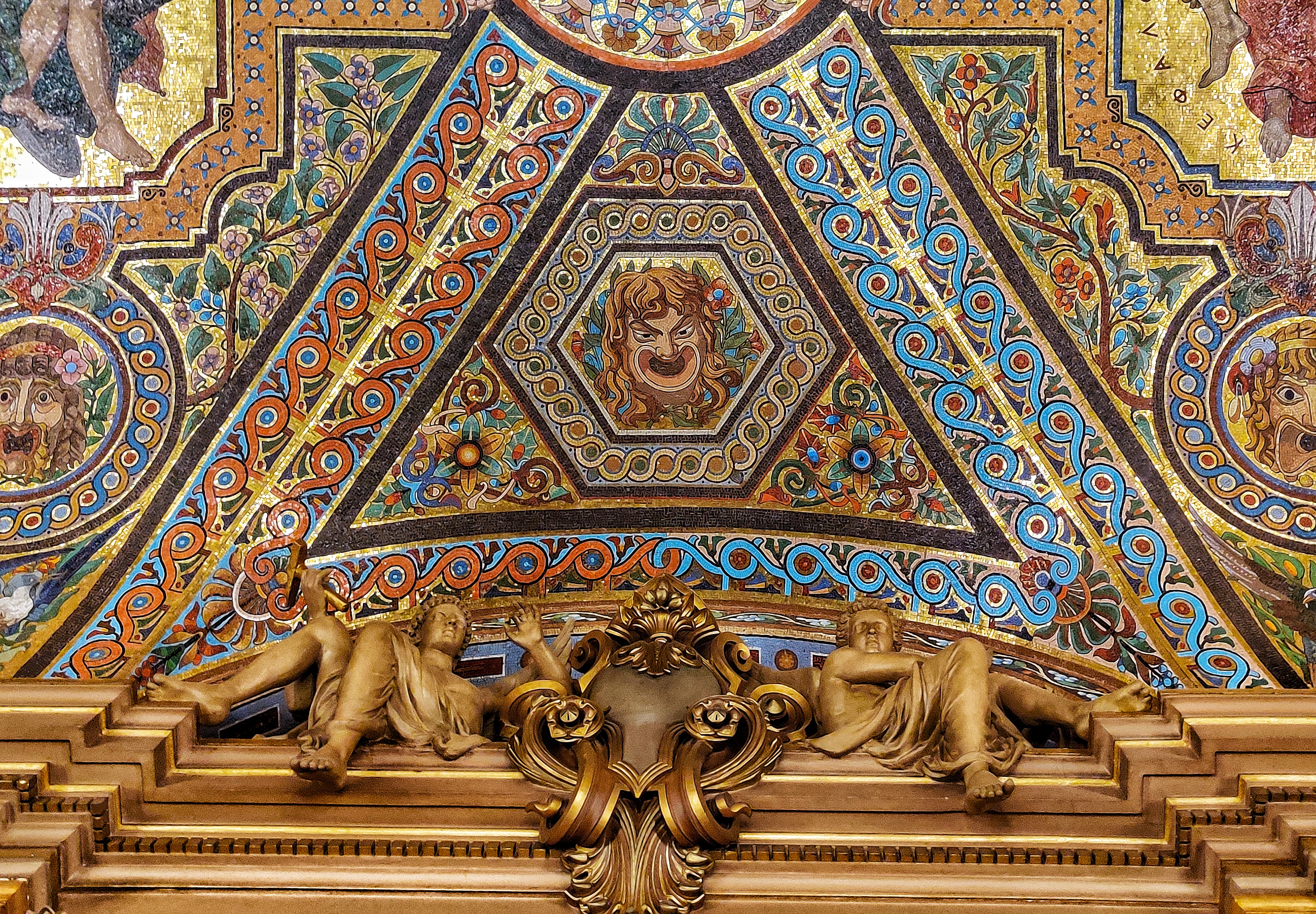

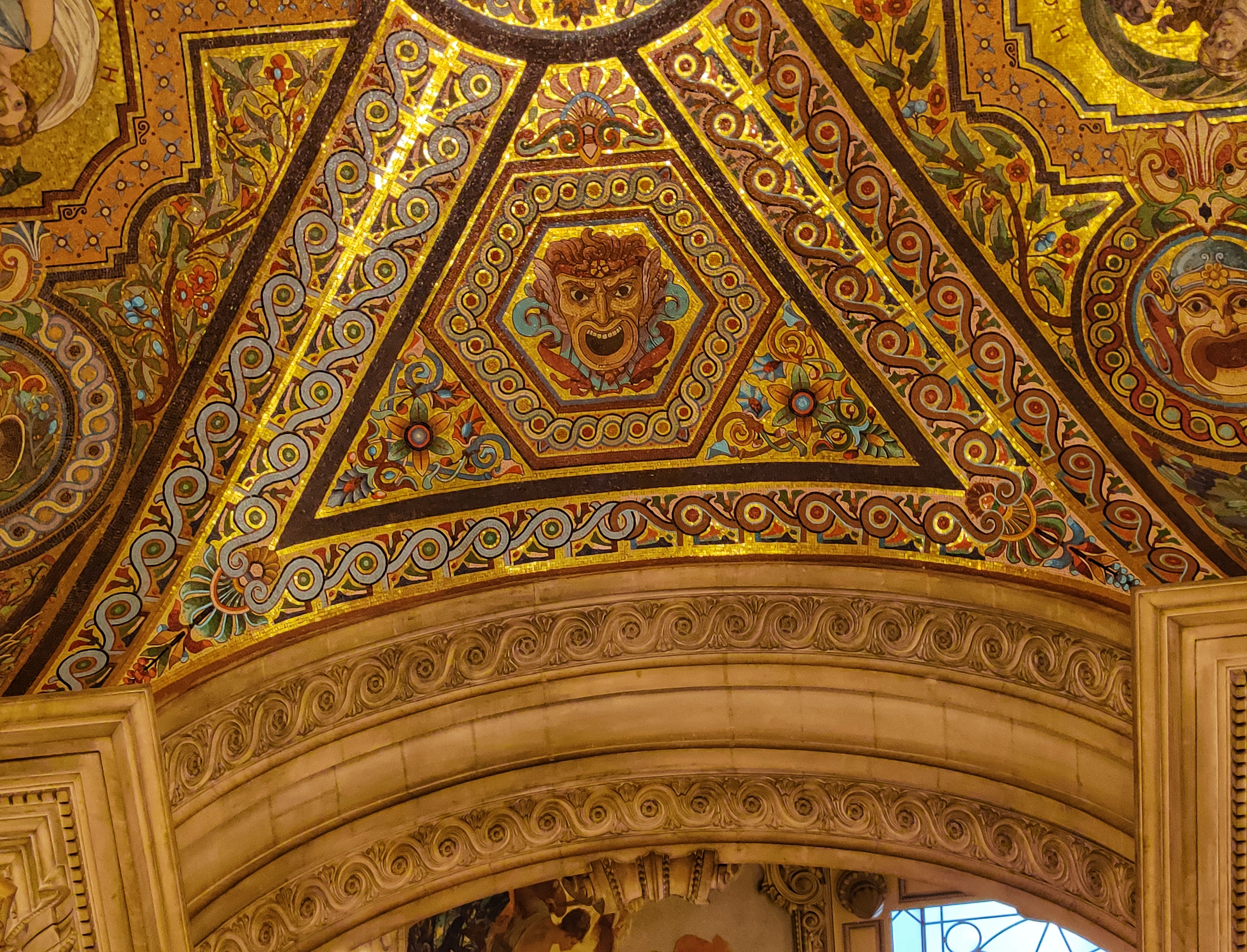

===== The four medallions =====
There are four gilt bronze medallions representing musical instruments (sistrum for Egypt, lyre for Greece, tambourine and pan flute for Italy, ivory horn for France), encircled by leaf-work characteristic of each country and have the name of the countries in Greek (Egypt=ΑΙΓΥΠΤΟΣ, Greece=ΕΛΛΑΣ, Italy=ΙΤΑΛΙΑ and France=ΓΑΛΛΙΑ).

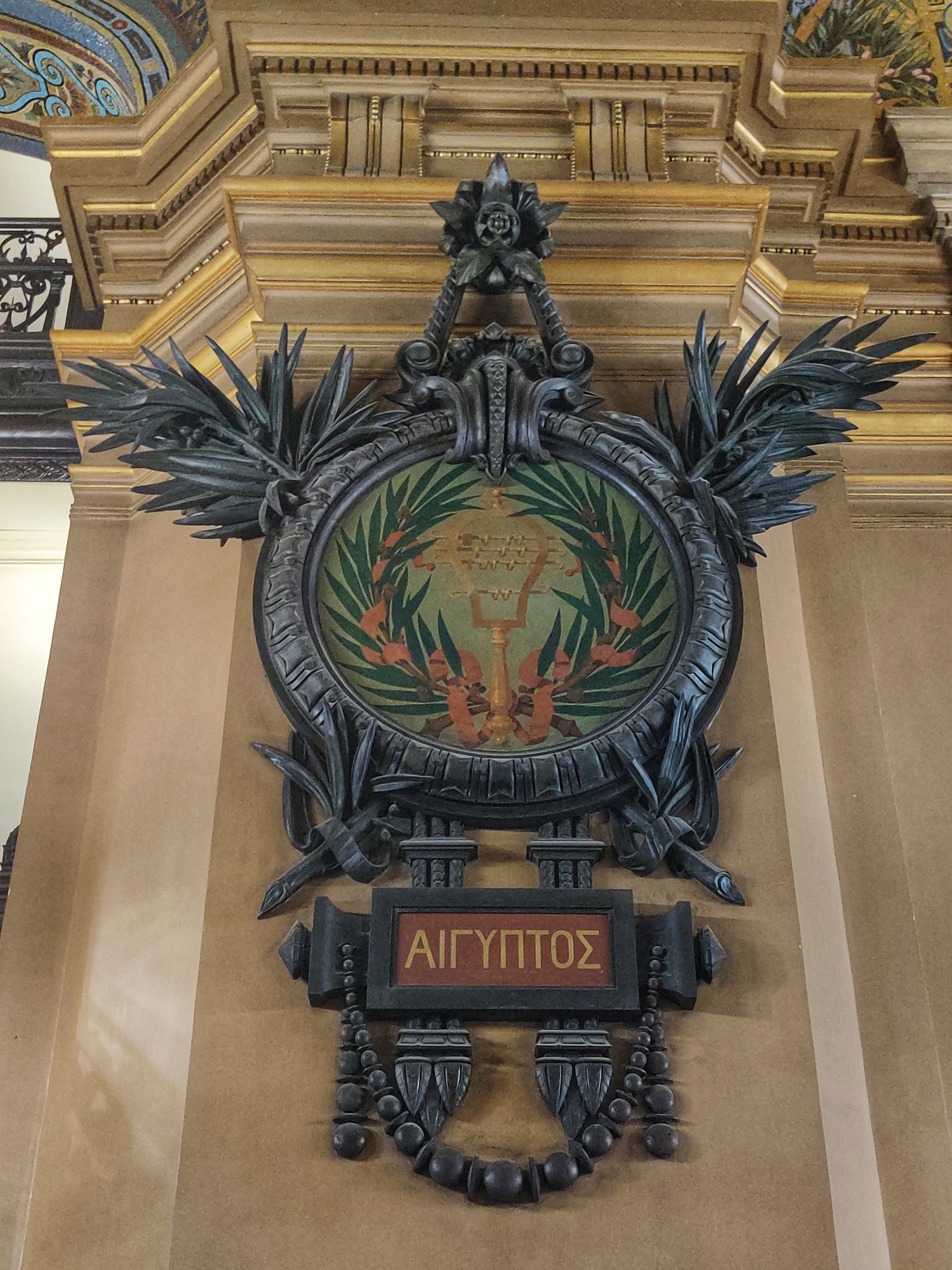
Egypt medallion

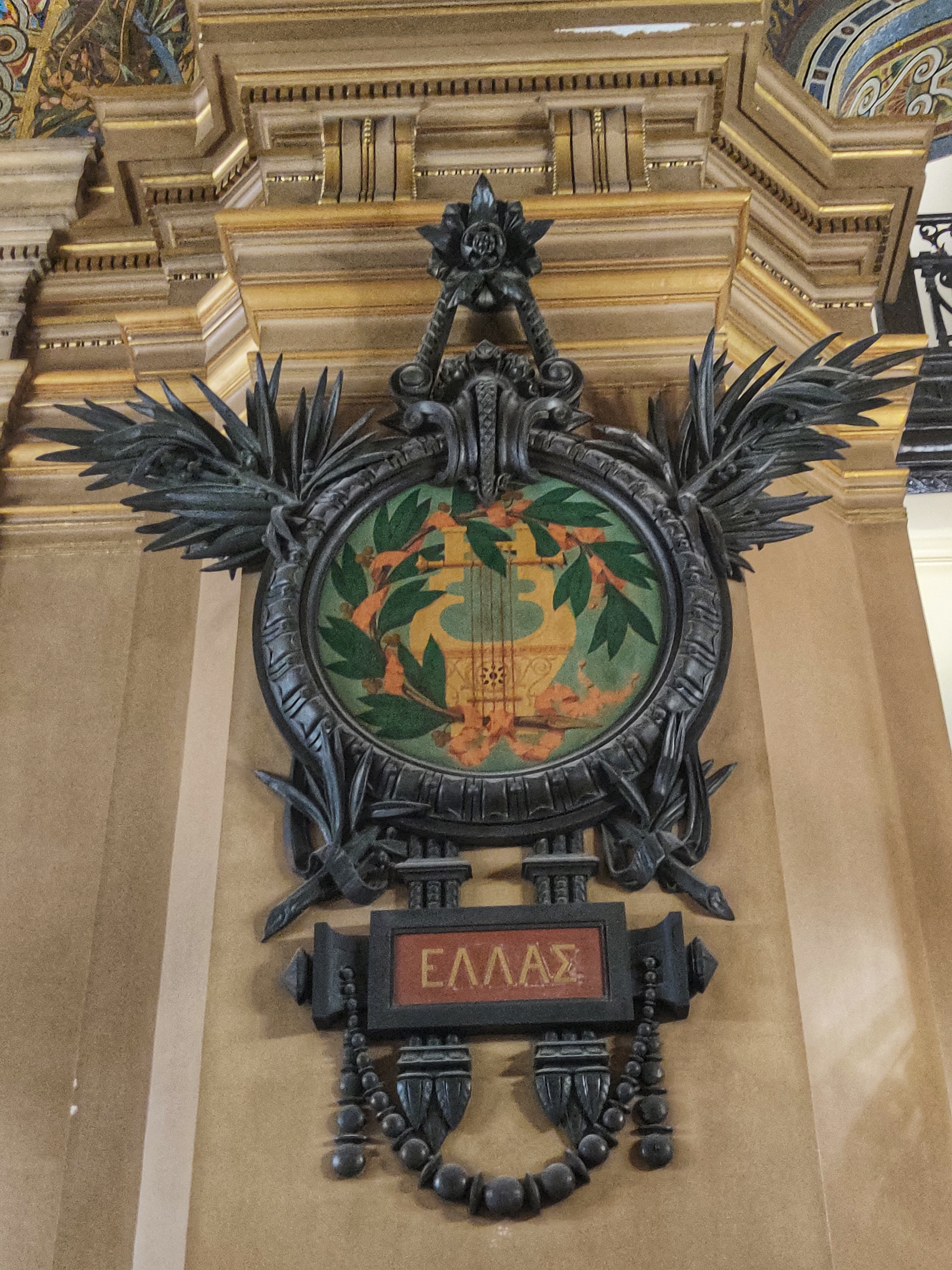
Greece medallion

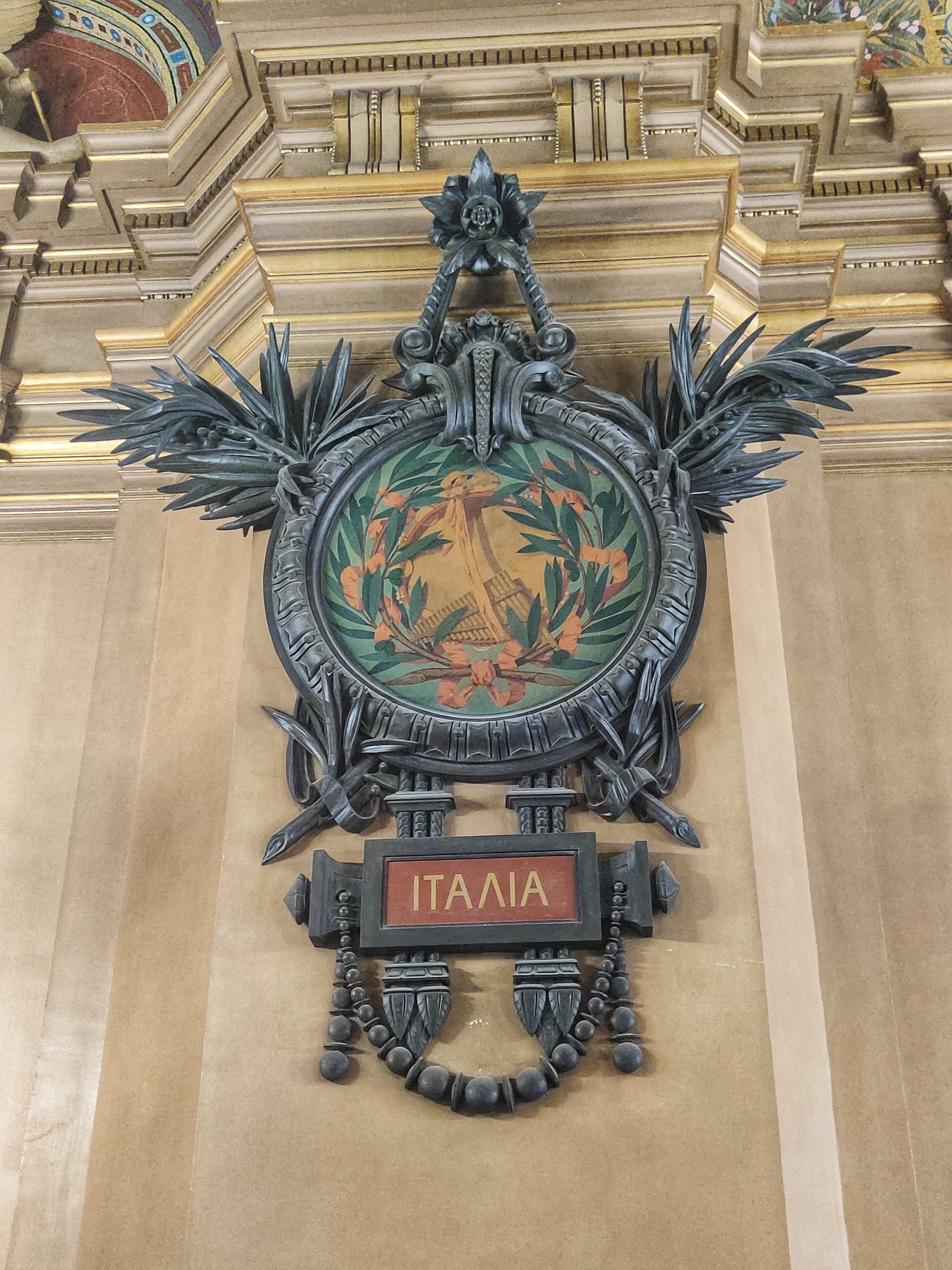
Italy medallion

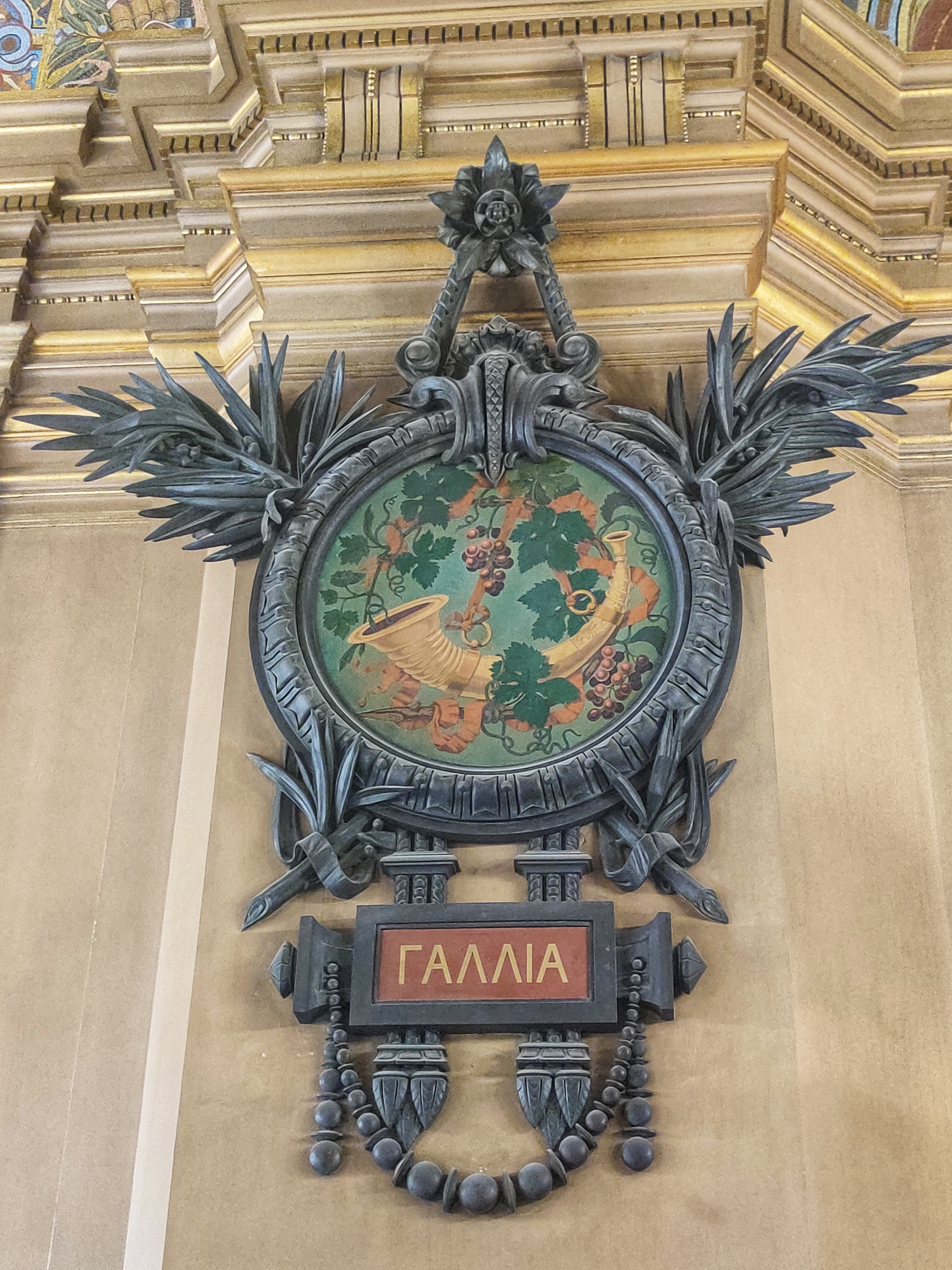
France medallion

==== The Salons of the Sun and Moon ====
At the east and west end of the Avant foyer there are the Salon du Soleil (Salon of the Sun) and the Salon de la Lune (Salon of the Moon). They were designed as the entrance vestibules for the smoking room and the Galerie du Glacier. Their themes were heat for the smoking room and cold for the Glacier, but because they completed in haste in order to be ready for the inauguration of 1875, in the rush there was a mistake and the themes were reversed.

==== Grand foyer ====
This hall, 18 metres (59 ft) high, 54 metres (177 ft) long and 13 metres (43 ft) wide, was designed to act as a drawing room for Paris society. It was restored in 2004. Its ceiling was painted by Paul-Jacques-Aimé Baudry and represents various moments in the history of music. The foyer opens onto an outside loggia and is flanked by two octagonal salons with ceilings painted by Jules-Élie Delaunay in the eastern salon and Félix-Joseph Barrias in the western salon. The octagonal salons open to the north into the Salon de la Lune at the western end of the Avant-Foyer and the Salon du Soleil at its eastern end.

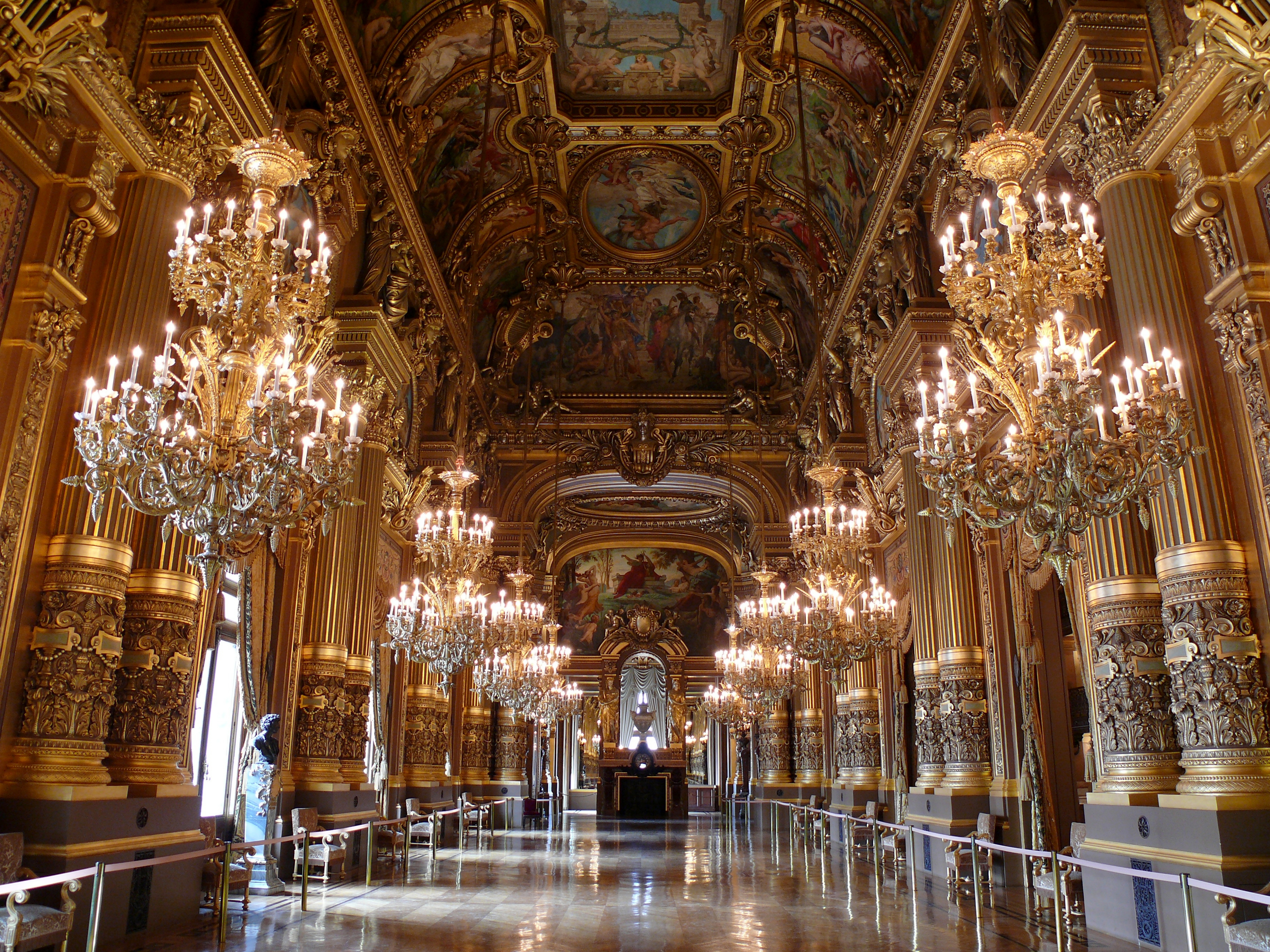
View of the Grand Foyer looking west

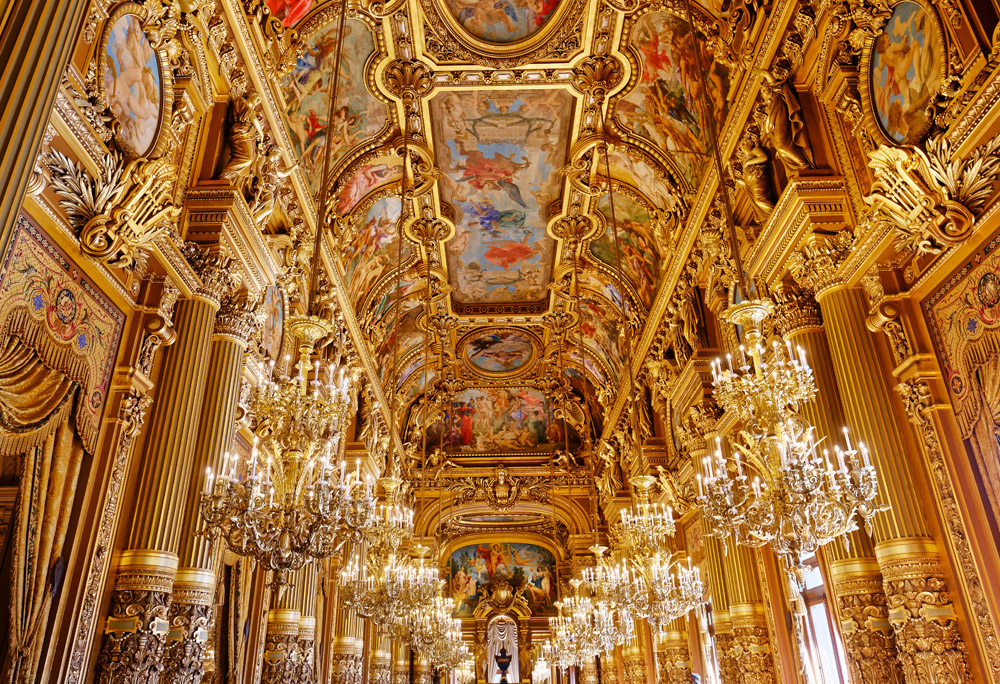
View of the Grand Foyer looking east

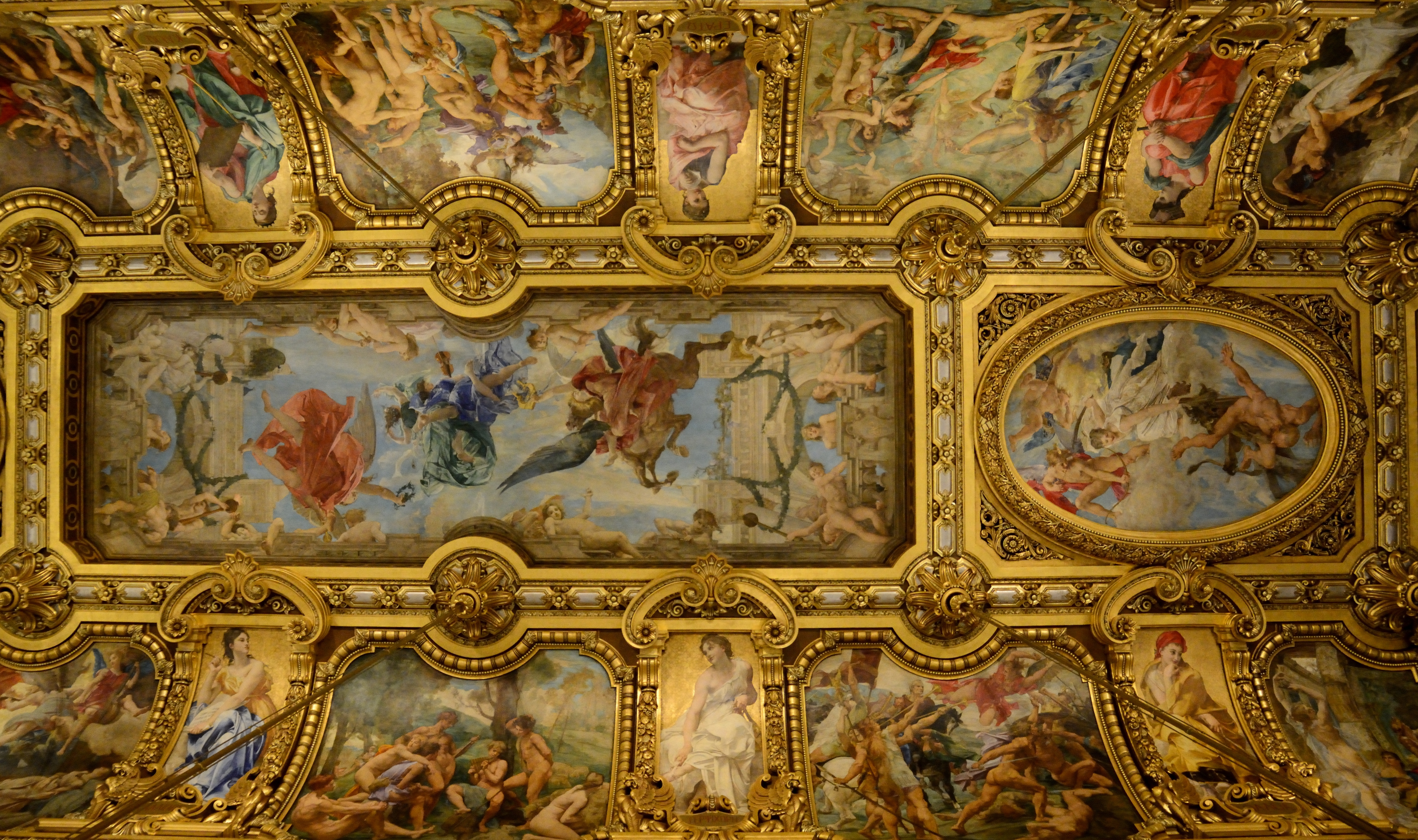
Part of the ceiling of the Grand Foyer with paintings by Paul Baudry: the central rectangular panel is Music, while the oval panel at the western end is Comedy.

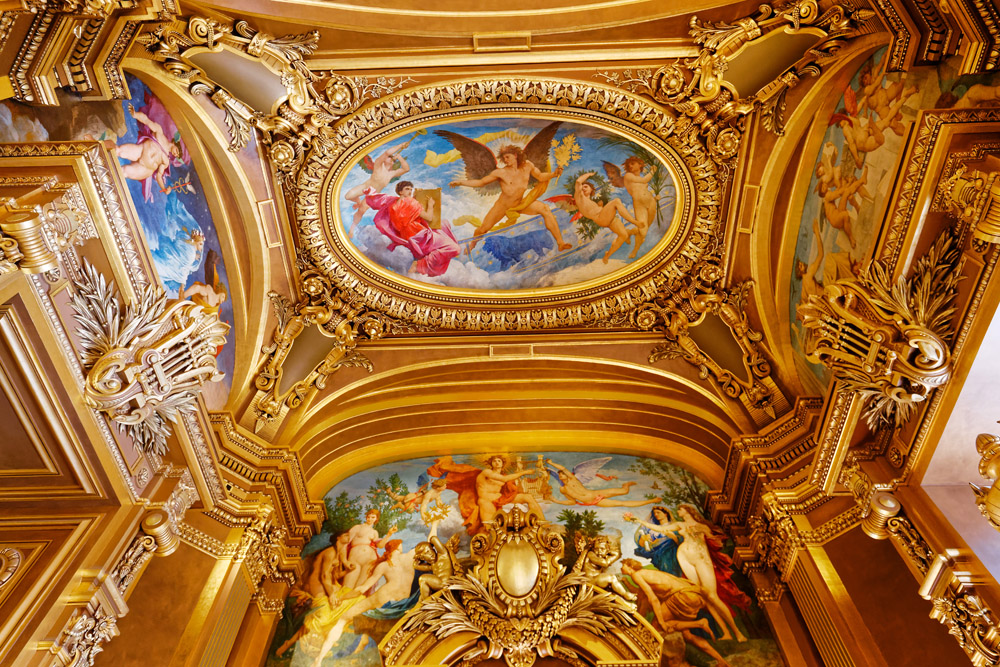
Ceiling of the octagonal salon at the eastern end with Jules-Élie Delaunay's central oval panel, The Zodiac, and over-door panel, Apollo Receiving the Lyre

===== Muses and personifications =====
There are eight canvases representing the Muses from the Greek mythology. In mythology, the Muses were nine, but because of lack of room, Polyhymnia was "sacrificed". Victorin de Joncières protested against this and wrote that it would be better if Urania was "sacrificed", since she was the Muse of Astronomy. Nuitter responded that Polyhymnia has a statue in the Grand Foyer among the Qualities. Polyhymnia is also depicted in the big Parnassus panel on the far right corner.

Image gallery with the muses and the personifications

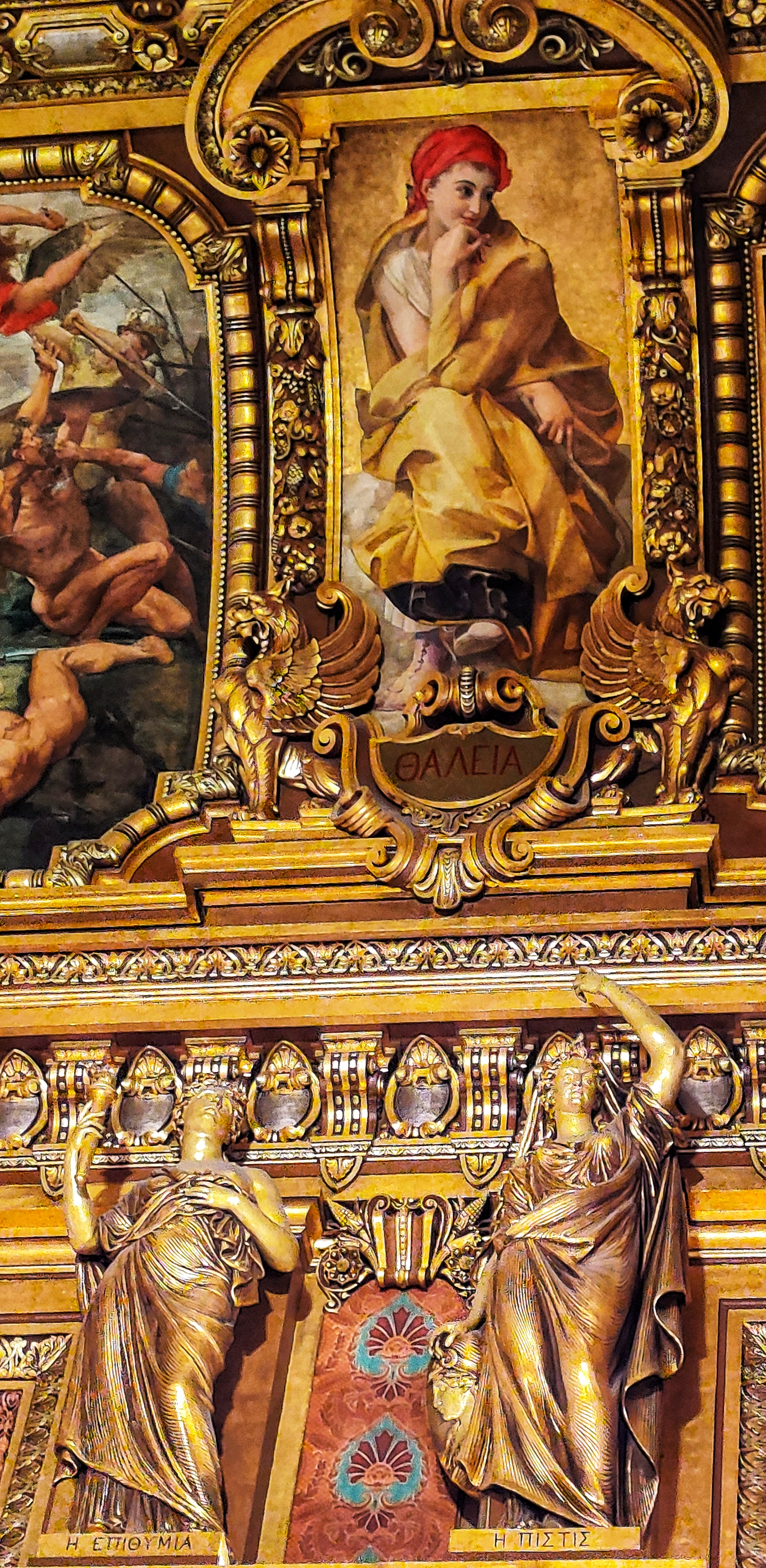
Thalia (top, Muse of comedy), Epithumia (bottom left, meaning desire) and Pistis (bottom right, meaning good faith, trust and reliability), their names are in Greek. Thalia = ΘΑΛΕΙΑ, Epithumia = Η ΕΠΙΘΥΜΙΑ and Pistis = Η ΠΙΣΤΙΣ

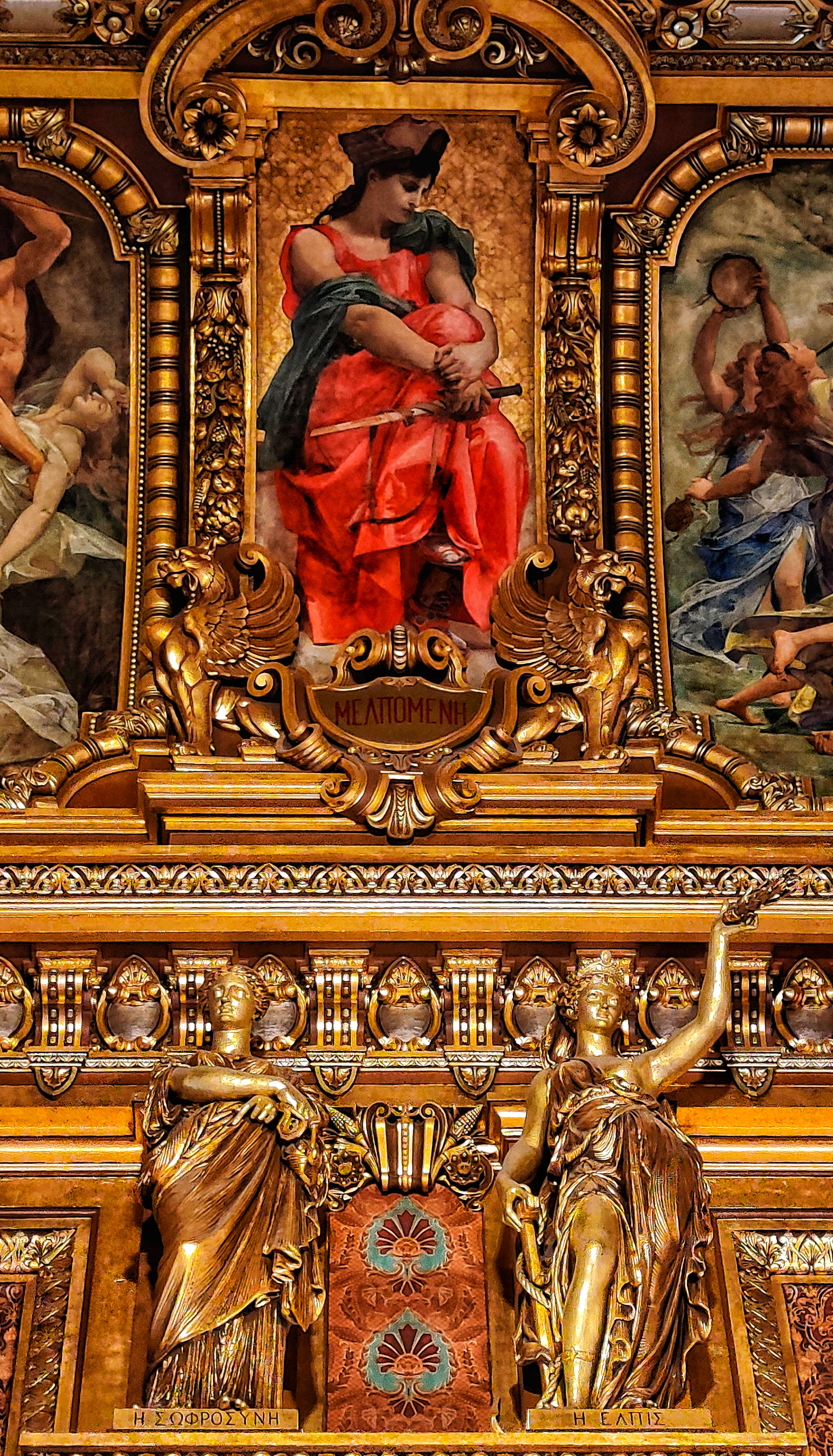
Melpomene (top, Muse of tragedy), Sophrosyne (bottom left, meaning excellence of character and soundness of mind) and Elpis (bottom right, meaning hope), their names are in Greek. Melpomene = ΜΕΛΠΟΜΕΝΗ, Elpis = Η ΕΛΠΙΣ and Sophrosyne = Η ΣΩΦΡΟΣΥΝΗ

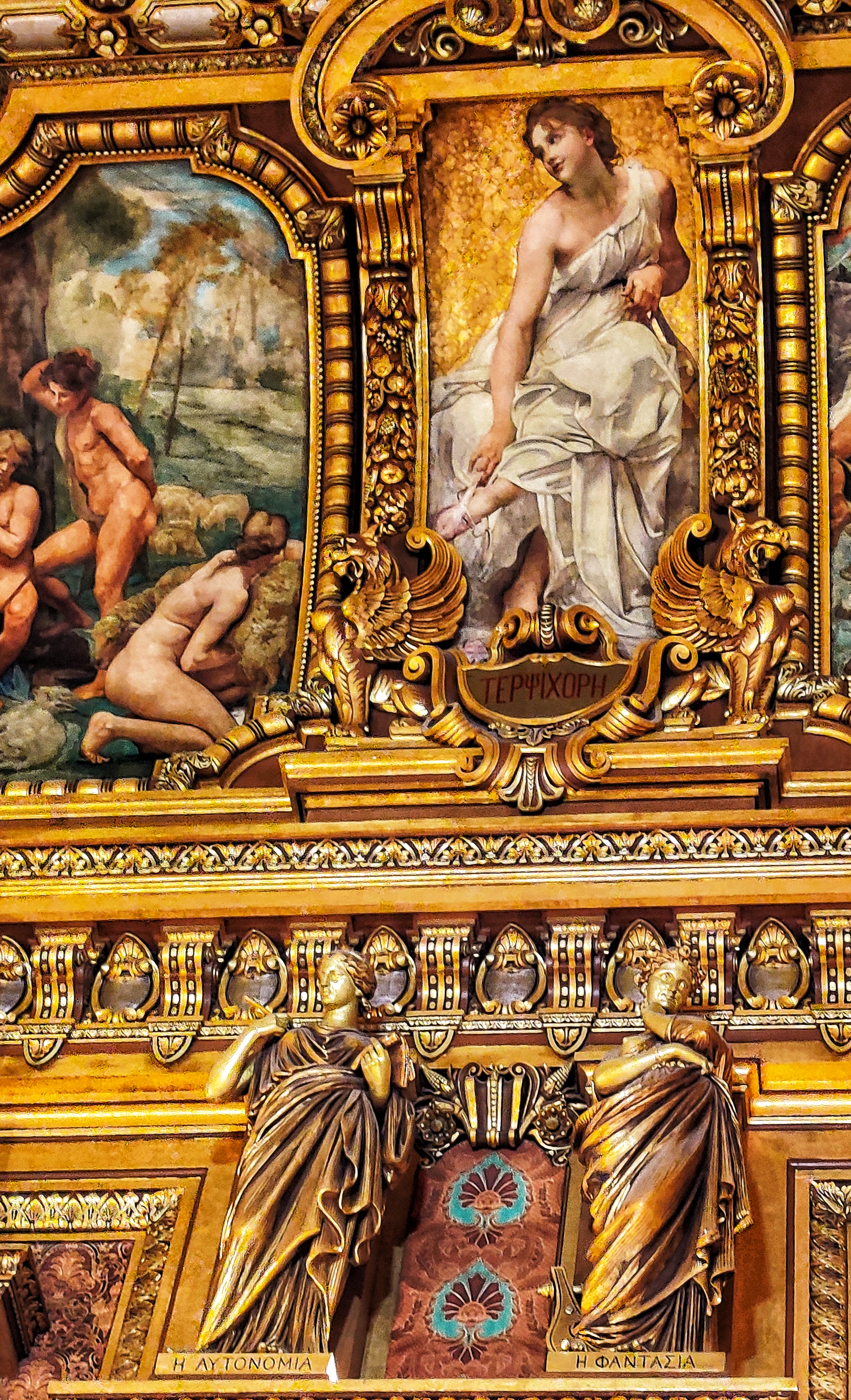
Terpsichore (top, Muse of dance), Autonomia (bottom left, meaning autonomy) and Phantasia (bottom right, meaning imagination), their names are in Greek. Terpsichore = ΤΕΡΨΙΧΟΡΗ, Autonomia = Η ΑΥΤΟΝΟΜΙΑ and Phantasia = H ΦΑΝΤΑΣΙΑ

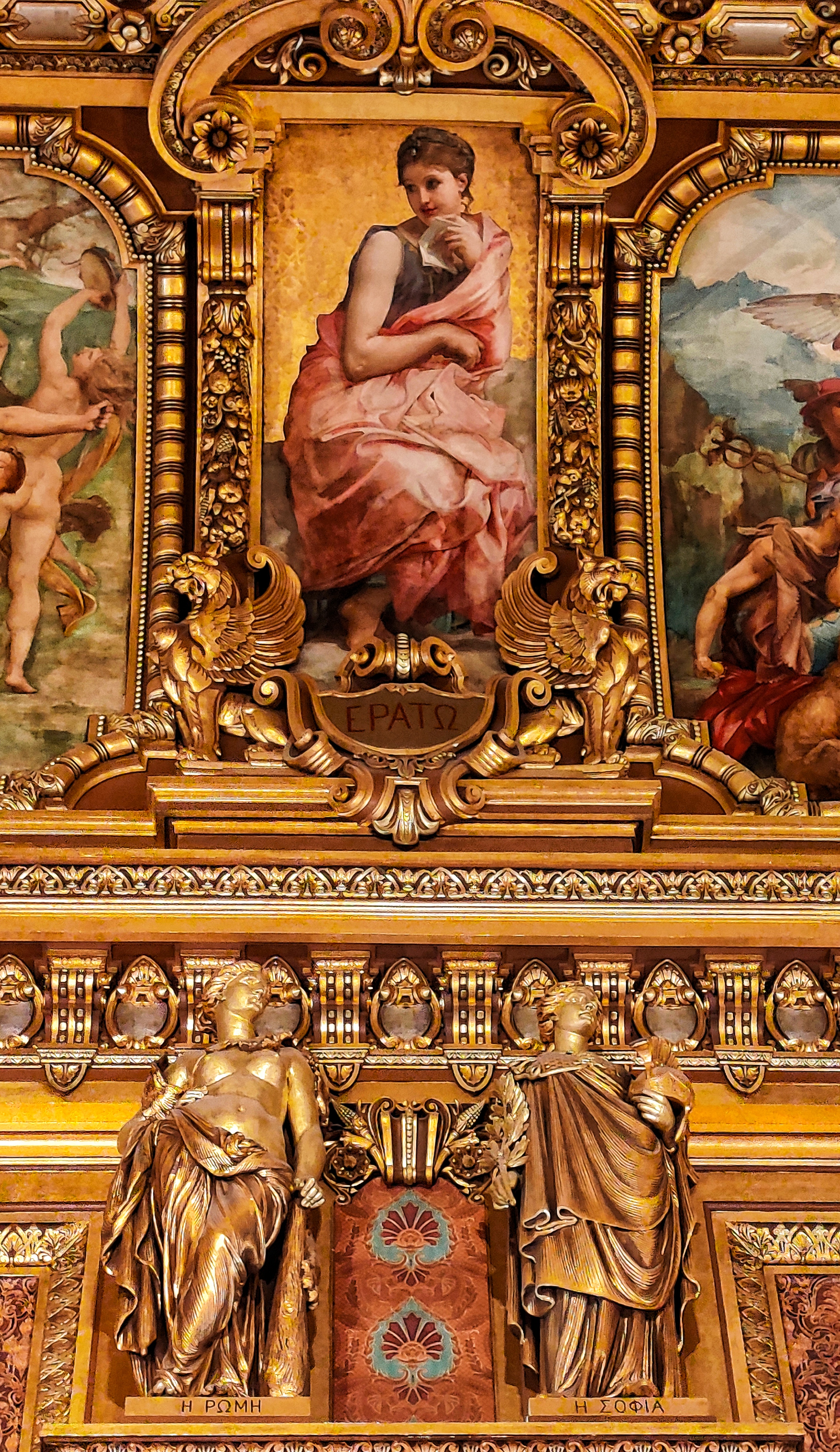
Erato (top, the Muse of lyric poetry), Rhome (bottom left, meaning strength) and Sophia (bottom right, meaning wisdom), their names are in Greek. Erato = ΕΡΑΤΩ, Rhome = Η ΡΩΜΗ and Sophia = Η ΣΟΦΙΑ

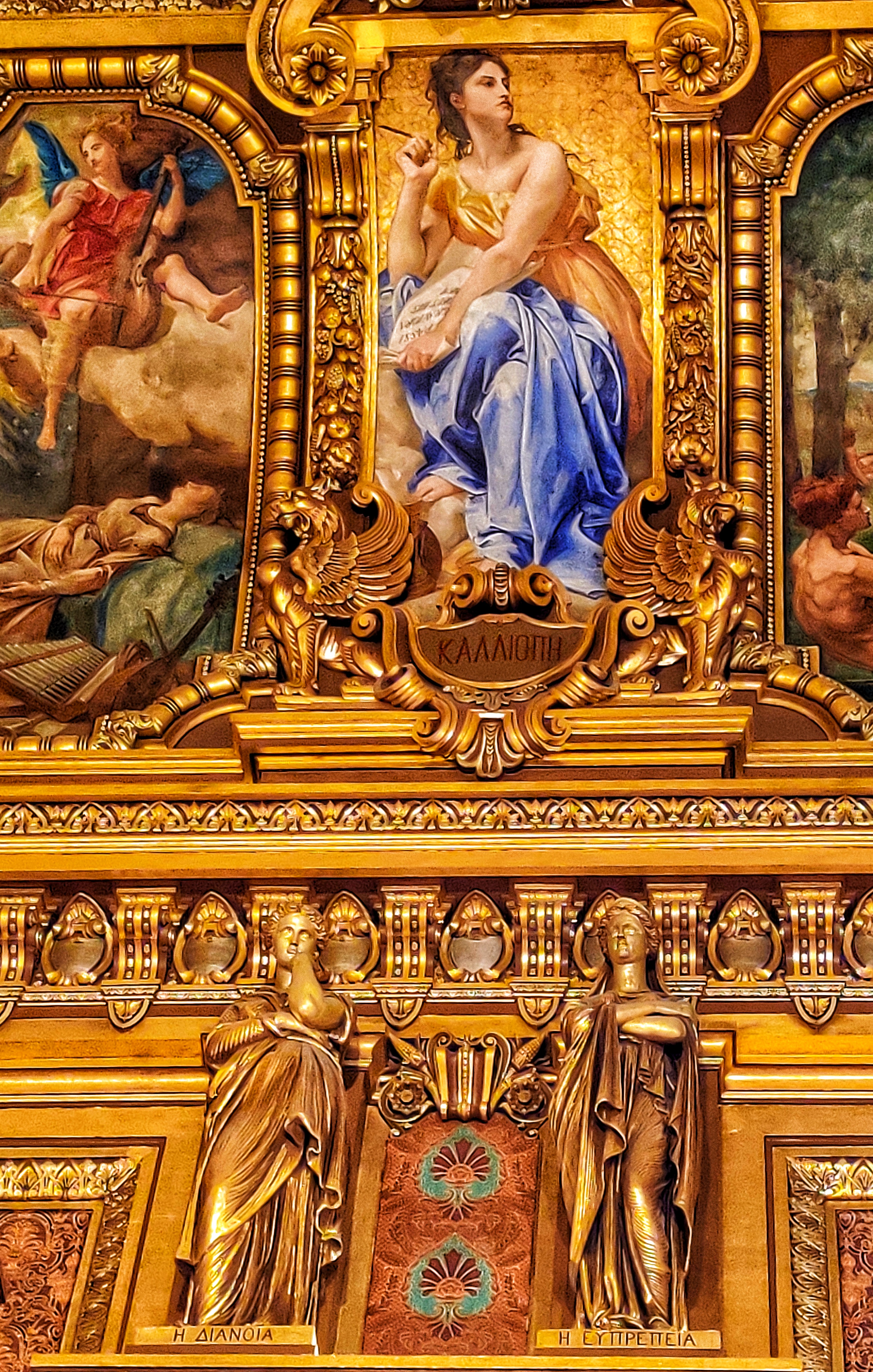
Calliope (top, Muse of eloquence and epic poetry), Dianoia (bottom left, meaning thinking) and Euprepia (bottom right, meaning preeminent beauty), their names are in Greek. Calliope = ΚΑΛΛΙΟΠΗ, Dianoia = Η ΔΙΑΝΟΙΑ and Euprepia = Η ΕΥΠΡΕΠΕΙΑ

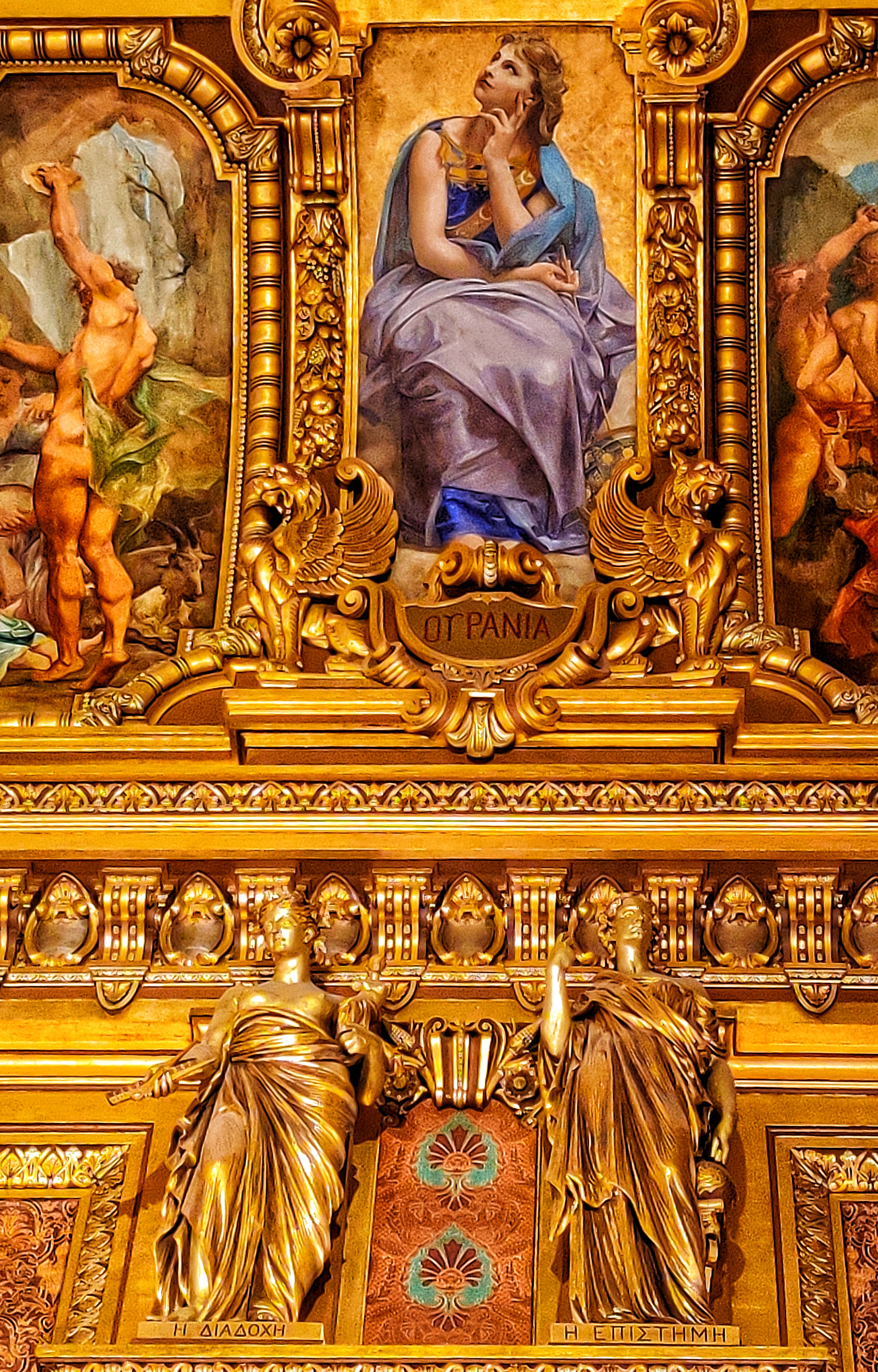
Urania (top, Muse of astronomy), Diadochi (bottom left, meaning succession) and Episteme (bottom right, meaning to know, to understand, to be acquainted with), their names are in Greek. Urania = ΟΥΡΑΝΙΑ, Diadochi = Η ΔΙΑΔΟΧΗ and Episteme = Η ΕΠΙΣΤΗΜΗ

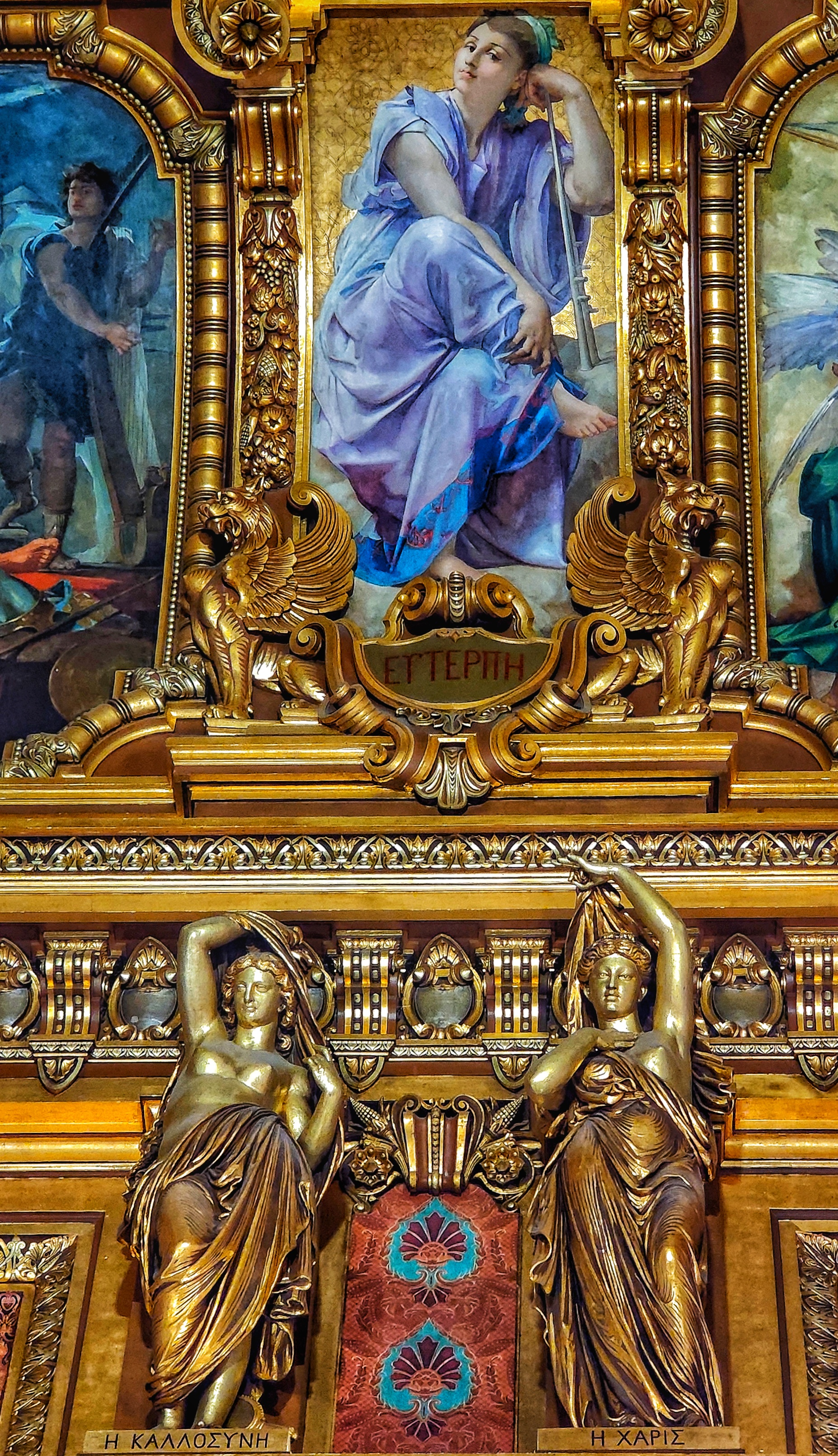
Euterpe (top, Muse of music), Kallosyni (bottom left, meaning kindness, charity) and Charis (bottom right, meaning grace), their names are in Greek. Euterpe = ΕΥΤΕΡΠΗ, Kallosyni = Η ΚΑΛΛΟΣΥΝΗ and Charis = Η ΧΑΡΙΣ

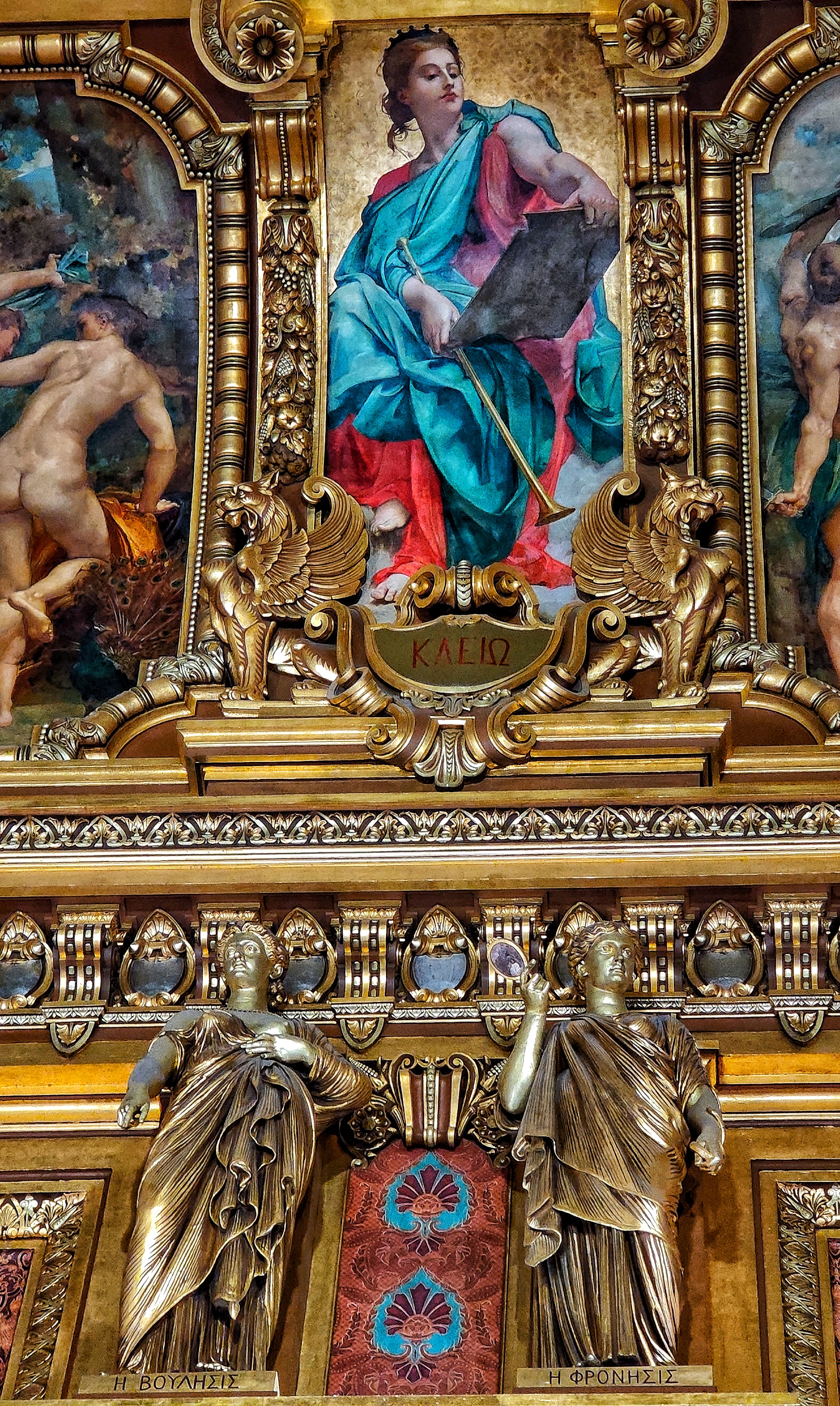
Clio (top, Muse of history), Boulesis (bottom left, meaning will) and Phronesis (bottom right, meaning prudence, practical virtue and practical wisdom), their names are in Greek. Clio = ΚΛΕΙΩ, Boulesis = Η ΒΟΥΛΗΣΙΣ and Phronesis = Η ΦΡΟΝΗΣΙΣ

==== Auditorium ====
The auditorium has a traditional Italian horseshoe shape and can seat 1,979. The stage is the largest in Europe and can accommodate as many as 450 artists. The canvas house curtain was painted to represent a draped curtain, complete with tassels and braid.

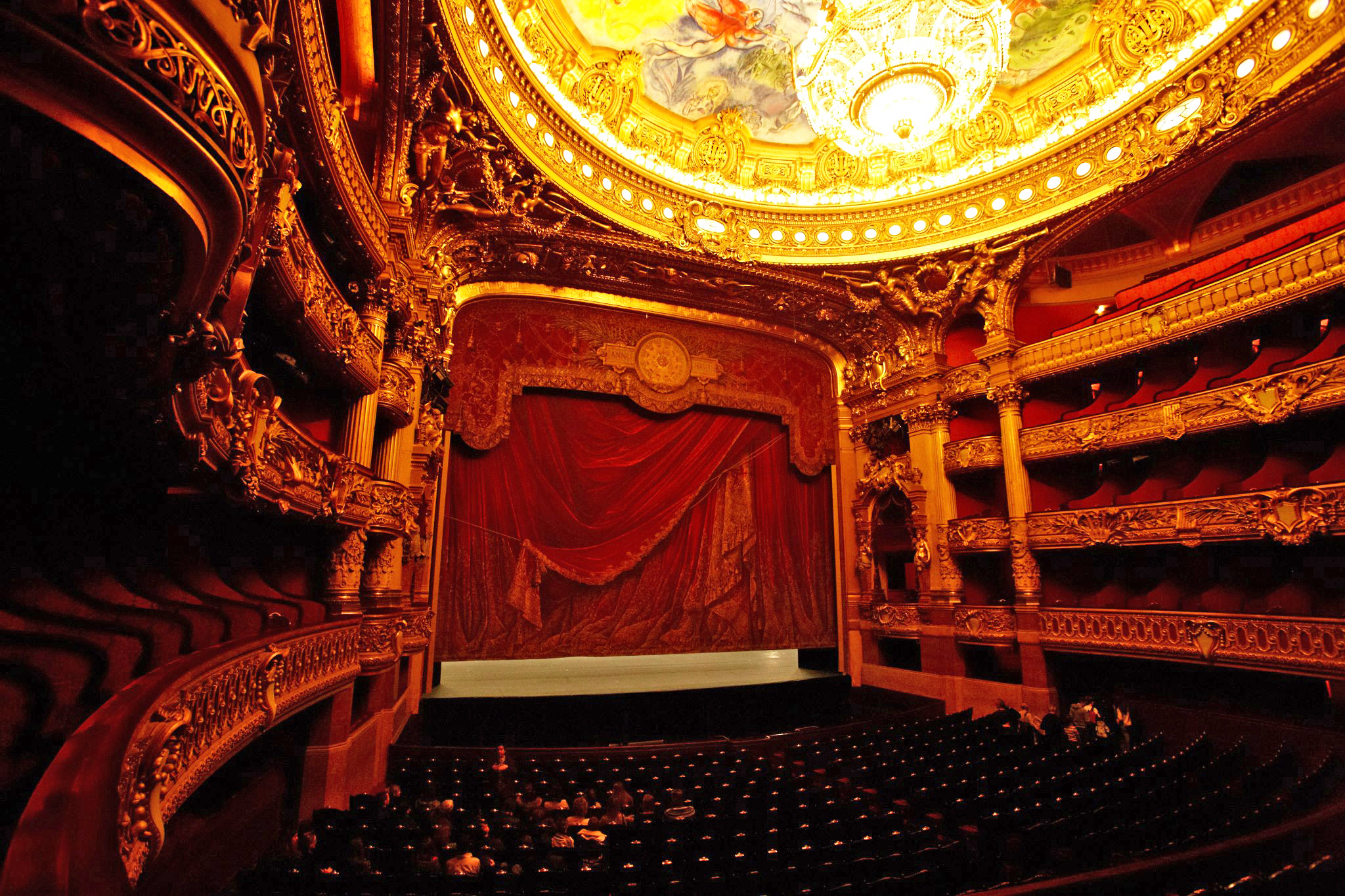
Auditorium

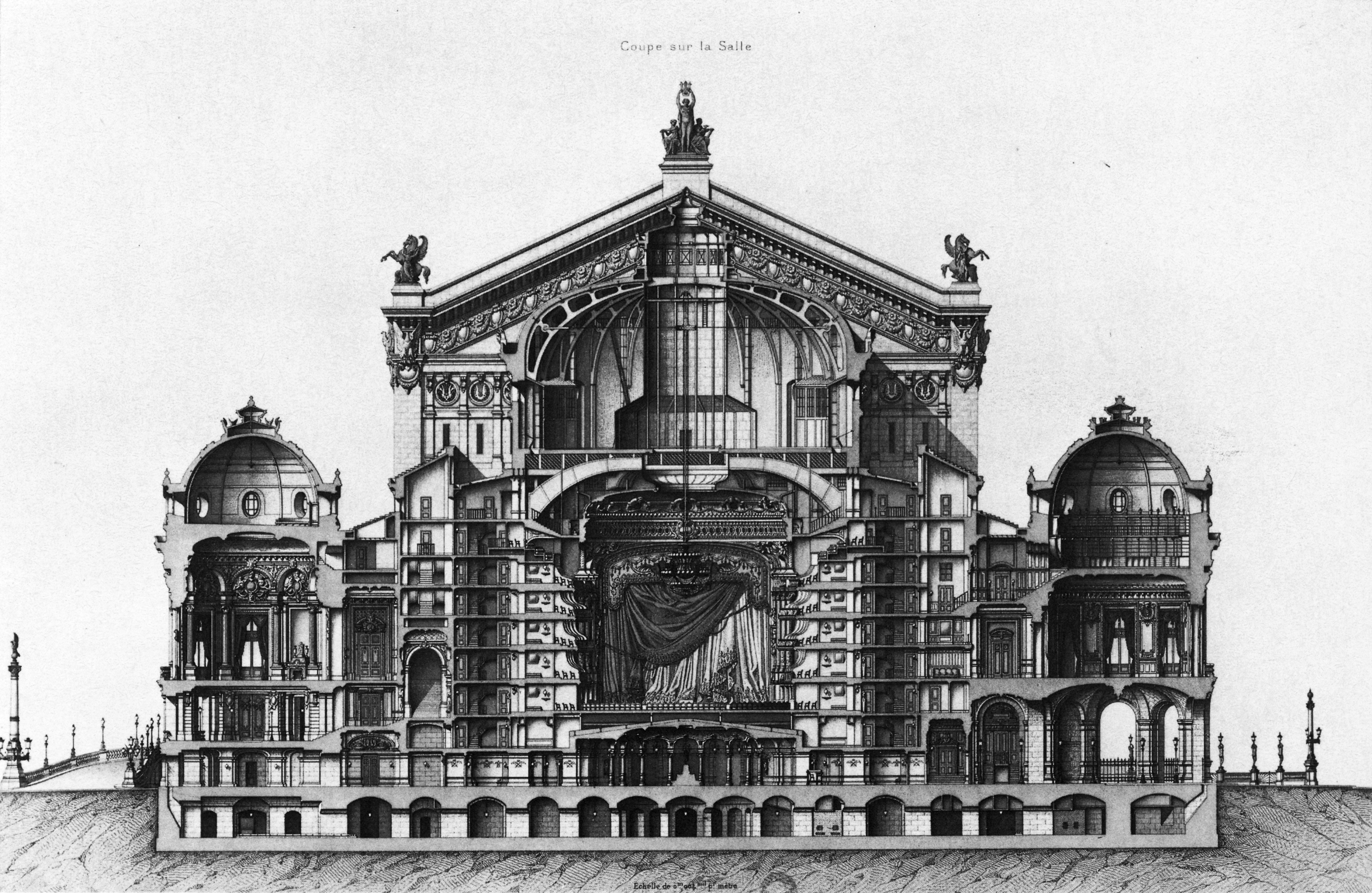
Transverse section at the auditorium and pavilions

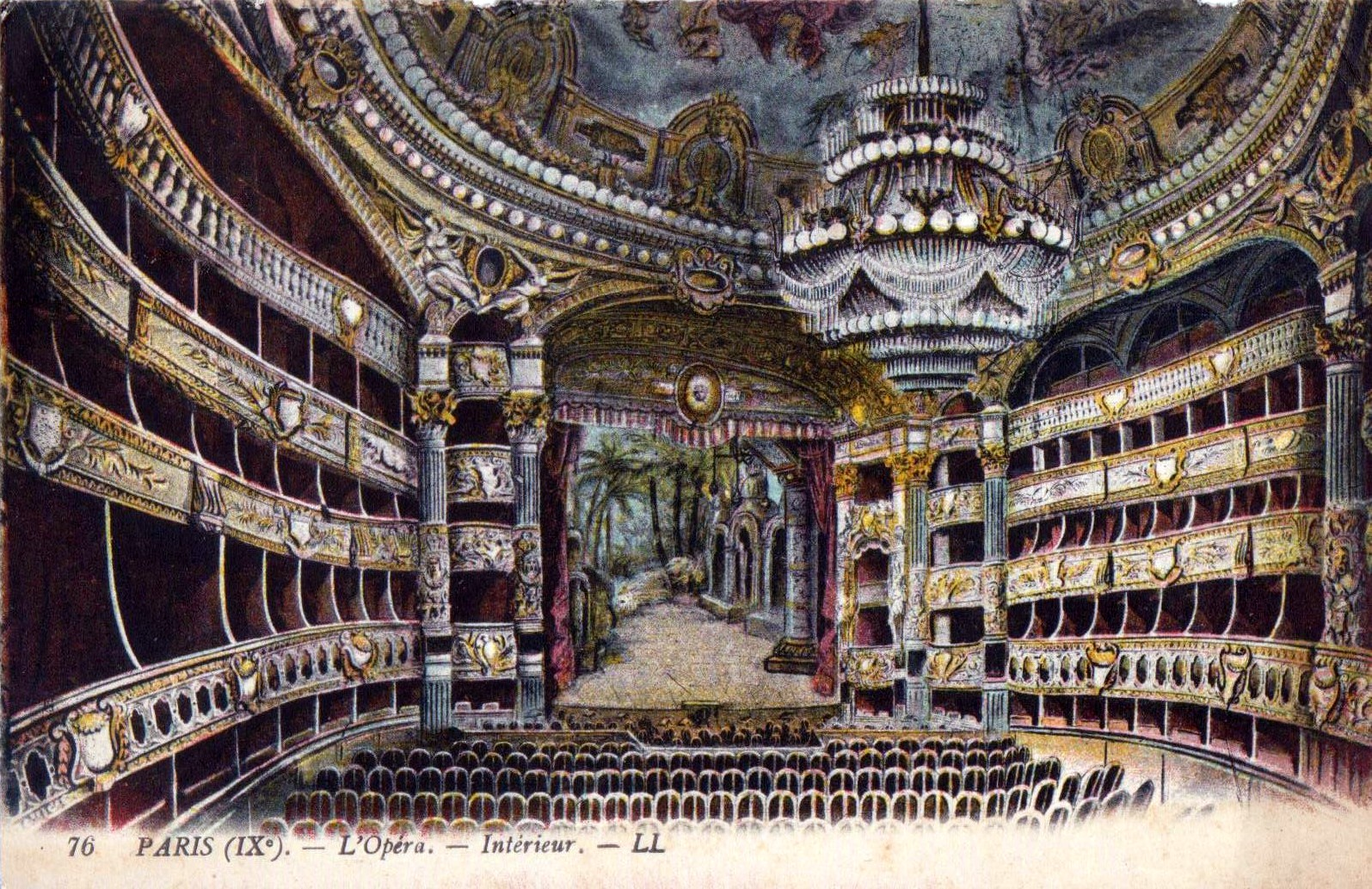
Auditorium. Postcard from 1909

The ceiling area which surrounds the chandelier was originally painted by Jules-Eugène Lenepveu. In 1964 a new ceiling painted by Marc Chagall was installed on a removable frame over the original. It depicts scenes from operas by 14 composers – Mussorgsky, Mozart, Wagner, Berlioz, Rameau, Debussy, Ravel, Stravinsky, Tchaikovsky, Adam, Bizet, Verdi, Beethoven, and Gluck. Although praised by some, others feel Chagall's work creates "a false note in Garnier's carefully orchestrated interior".

==== Chandelier ====
The seven-ton bronze and crystal chandelier was designed by Garnier. Jules Corboz prepared the model, and it was cast and chased by Lacarière, Delatour & Cie. The total cost came to 30,000 gold francs. The use of a central chandelier aroused controversy, and it was criticised for obstructing views of the stage by patrons in the fourth level boxes and views of the ceiling painted by Lenepveu. Garnier had anticipated these disadvantages but provided a lively defence in his 1871 book Le Théâtre: "What else could fill the theatre with such joyous life? What else could offer the variety of forms that we have in the pattern of the flames, in these groups and tiers of points of light, these wild hues of gold flecked with bright spots, and these crystalline highlights?"

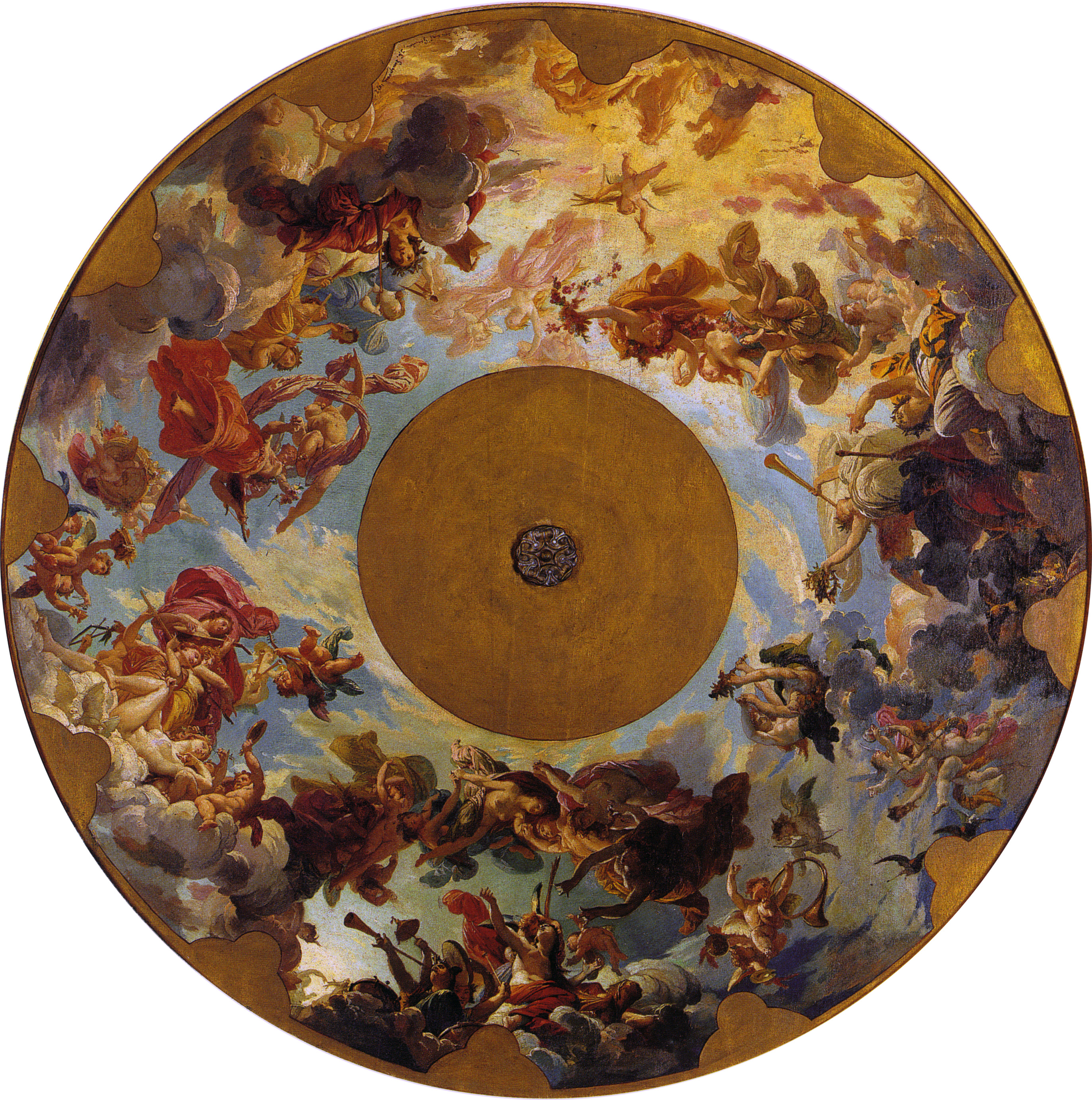
Final model for the ceiling painted by Jules-Eugène Lenepveu

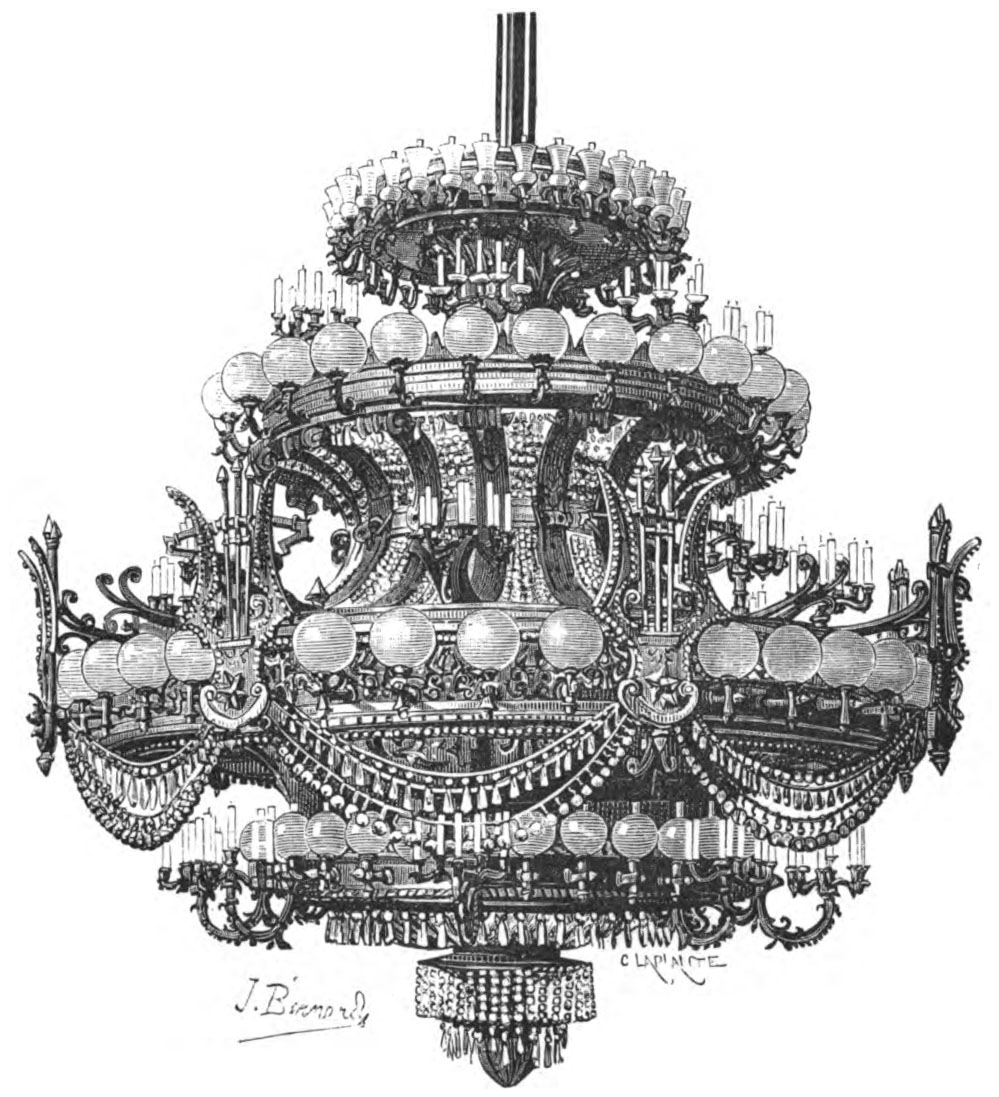
Auditorium chandelier

On 20 May 1896, one of the chandelier's counterweights broke free and burst through the ceiling into the auditorium, killing a concierge. This incident inspired one of the more famous scenes in Gaston Leroux's classic 1910 gothic novel The Phantom of the Opera.

Originally the chandelier was raised up through the ceiling into the cupola over the auditorium for cleaning, but now it is lowered. The space in the cupola was used in the 1960s for opera rehearsals, and in the 1980s was remodelled into two floors of dance rehearsal space. The lower floor consists of the Salle Nureïev (Nureyev) and the Salle Balanchine, and the upper floor, the Salle Petipa.

==== Organ ====
The grand organ was built by Aristide Cavaillé-Coll for use during lyrical works. It has been out of service for several decades and is in poor condition. In August 2026, Manufacture d'Orgues Bauer began removing the instrument into storage at the Opéra Bastille for future installation in another undisclosed location.

==== Restaurant ====
Garnier had originally planned to install a restaurant in the opera house; however, for budgetary reasons, it was not completed in the original design.

On the third attempt to introduce it since 1875, a restaurant was opened on the eastern side of the building in 2011. L'Opéra Restaurant was designed by French architect Odile Decq. The chef was Christophe Aribert; in October 2015, Guillame Tison-Malthé became the new head chef. The restaurant, which has three different spaces and a large outside terrace, is accessible to the general public.

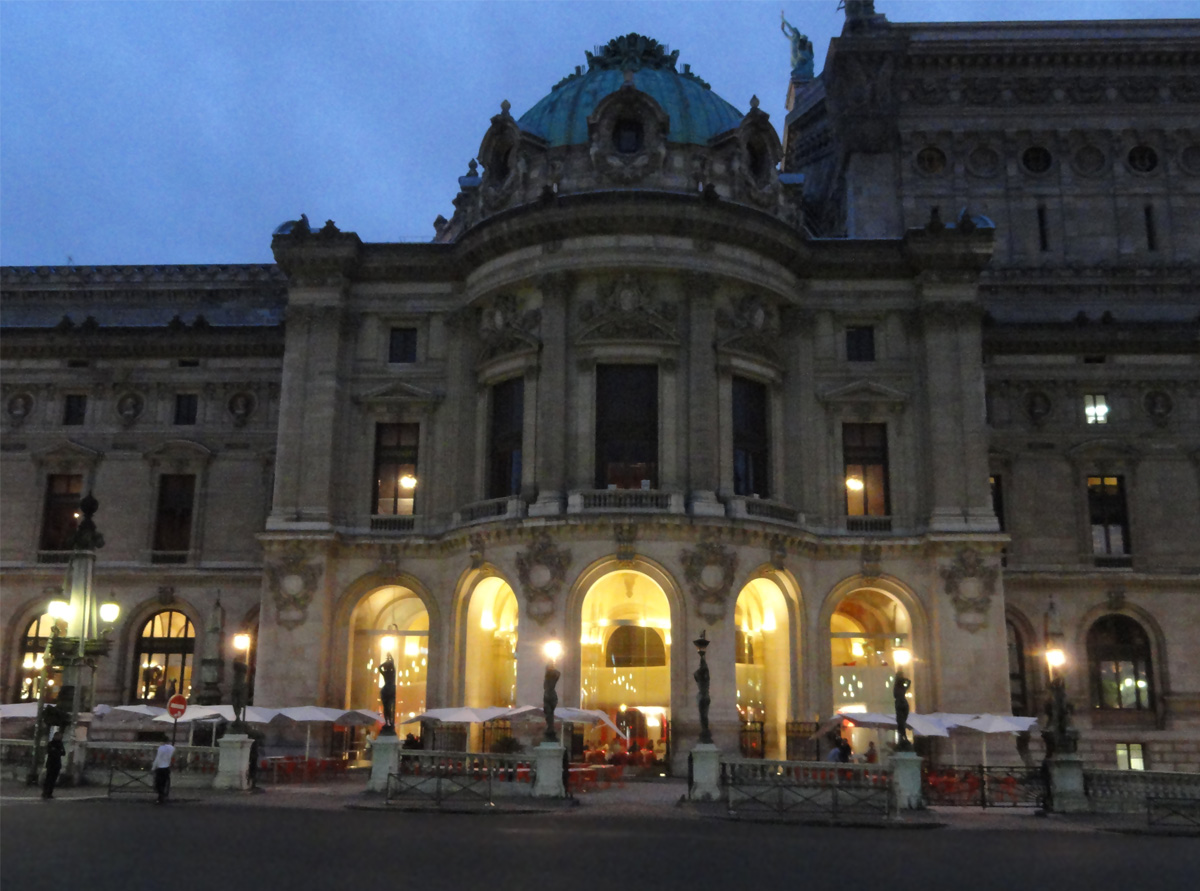
Palais Garnier east side with L'Opéra Restaurant

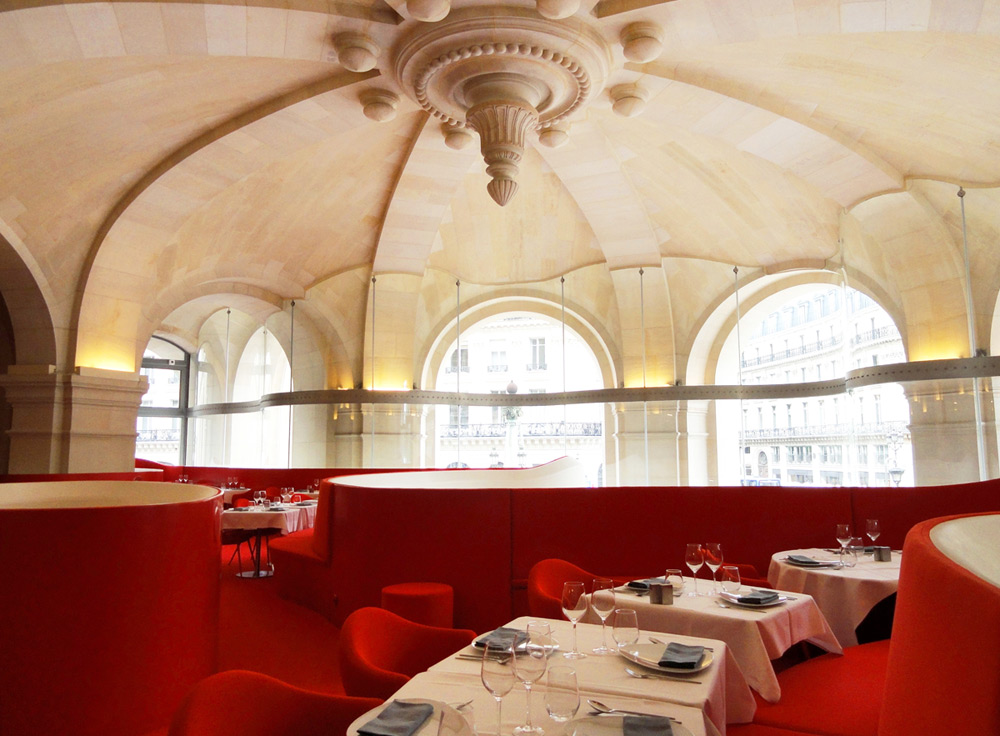
L'Opéra Restaurant opened in 2011

== History ==
=== Selection of a site ===
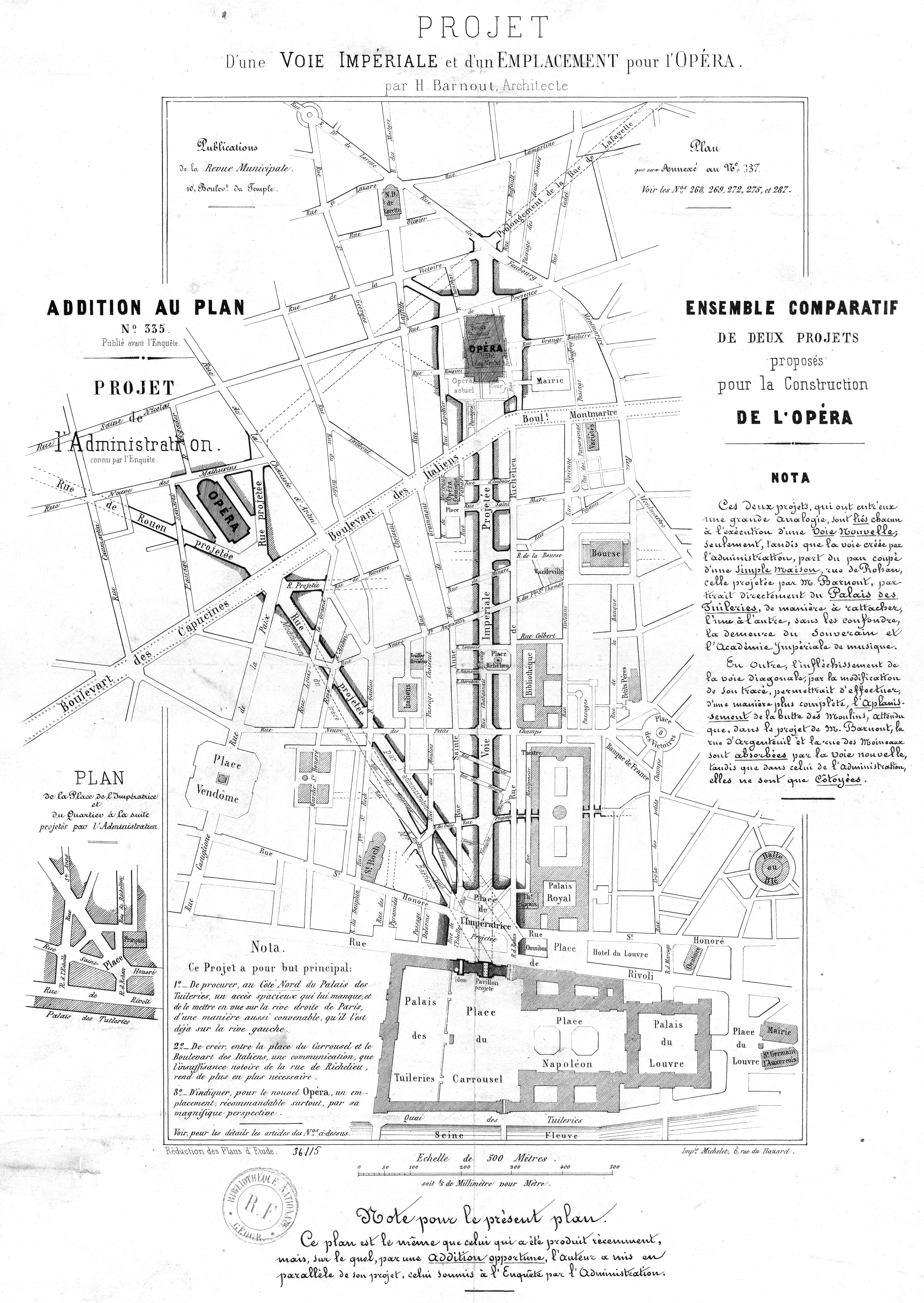
Two proposed sites for a new opera house, c. 1856, with alternative routes for a broad avenue leading from the Louvre to the new theatre (the future Avenue de l'Opéra)

In 1821 the Opéra de Paris had moved into the temporary building known as the Salle Le Peletier on the rue Le Peletier. Since then a new permanent building had been desired. Charles Rohault de Fleury, who was appointed the opera's official architect in 1846, undertook various studies in suitable sites and designs. By 1847, the Prefect of the Seine, Claude-Philibert de Rambuteau, had selected a site on the east side of the Place du Palais-Royal as part of an extension of the Rue de Rivoli. However, with the Revolution of 1848, Rambuteau was dismissed, and interest in the construction of a new opera house waned. The site was later used for the Grand Hôtel du Louvre (designed in part by Charles Rohault de Fleury).

With the establishment of the Second Empire in 1852 and Georges-Eugène Haussmann's appointment as Prefect of the Seine in June 1853, interest in a new opera house revived. There was an attempted assassination of Emperor Napoleon III at the entrance to the Salle Le Peletier on 14 January 1858. The Salle Le Peletier's constricted street access highlighted the need for a separate, more secure entrance for the head of state. This concern and the inadequate facilities and temporary nature of the theatre gave added urgency to the building of a new state-funded opera house. By March, Haussmann settled on Rohault de Fleury's proposed site off the Boulevard des Capucines, although this decision was not announced publicly until 1860. A new building would help resolve the awkward convergence of streets at this location, and the site was economical in terms of the cost of land.

On 29 September 1860 an Imperial Decree officially designated the site for the new Opéra, which would eventually occupy 12,000 square metres (1.2 ha; 130,000 sq ft). By November 1860 Rohault de Fleury had completed the design for what he thought would be the crowning work of his career and was also working on a commission from the city to design the façades of the other buildings lining the new square to ensure they were in harmony. However, that same month Achille Fould was replaced as Minister of State by Count Alexandre Colonna-Walewski. His wife Marie Anne de Ricci Poniatowska had used her position as mistress of Napoleon III to obtain her husband's appointment. Aware of competing designs and under pressure to give the commission to Viollet-le-Duc, who had the support of Empress Eugénie, Walewski escaped the need to make a decision by proposing to mount an architectural design competition to select the architect.

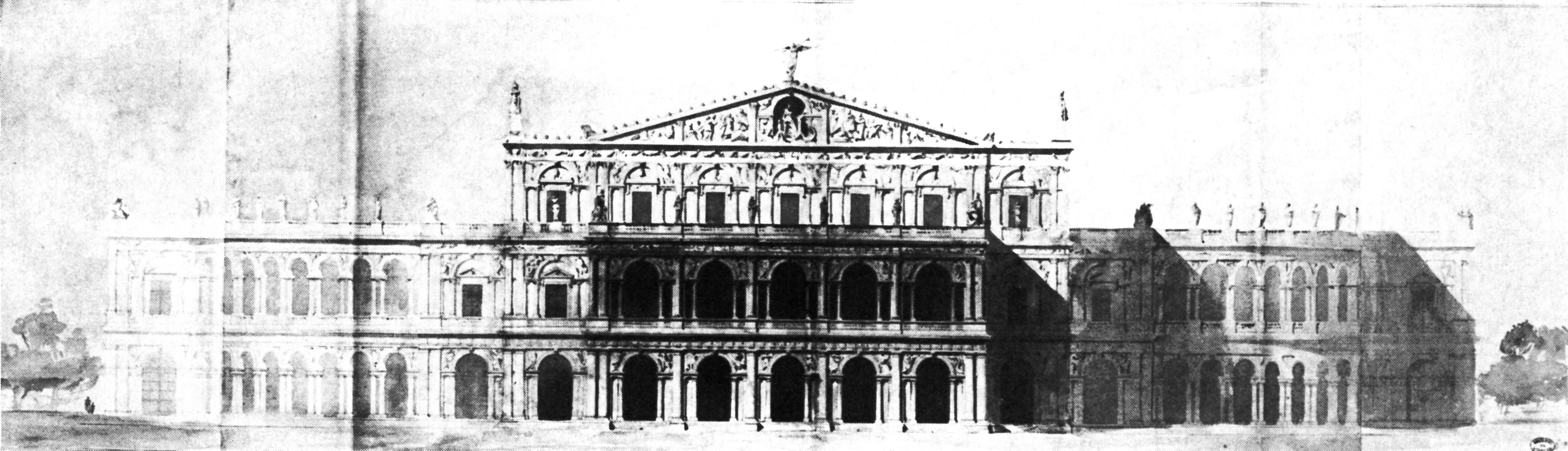
Entrance elevation of a project for the Théâtre Impériale de l'Opéra by Rohault de Fleury, November 1860

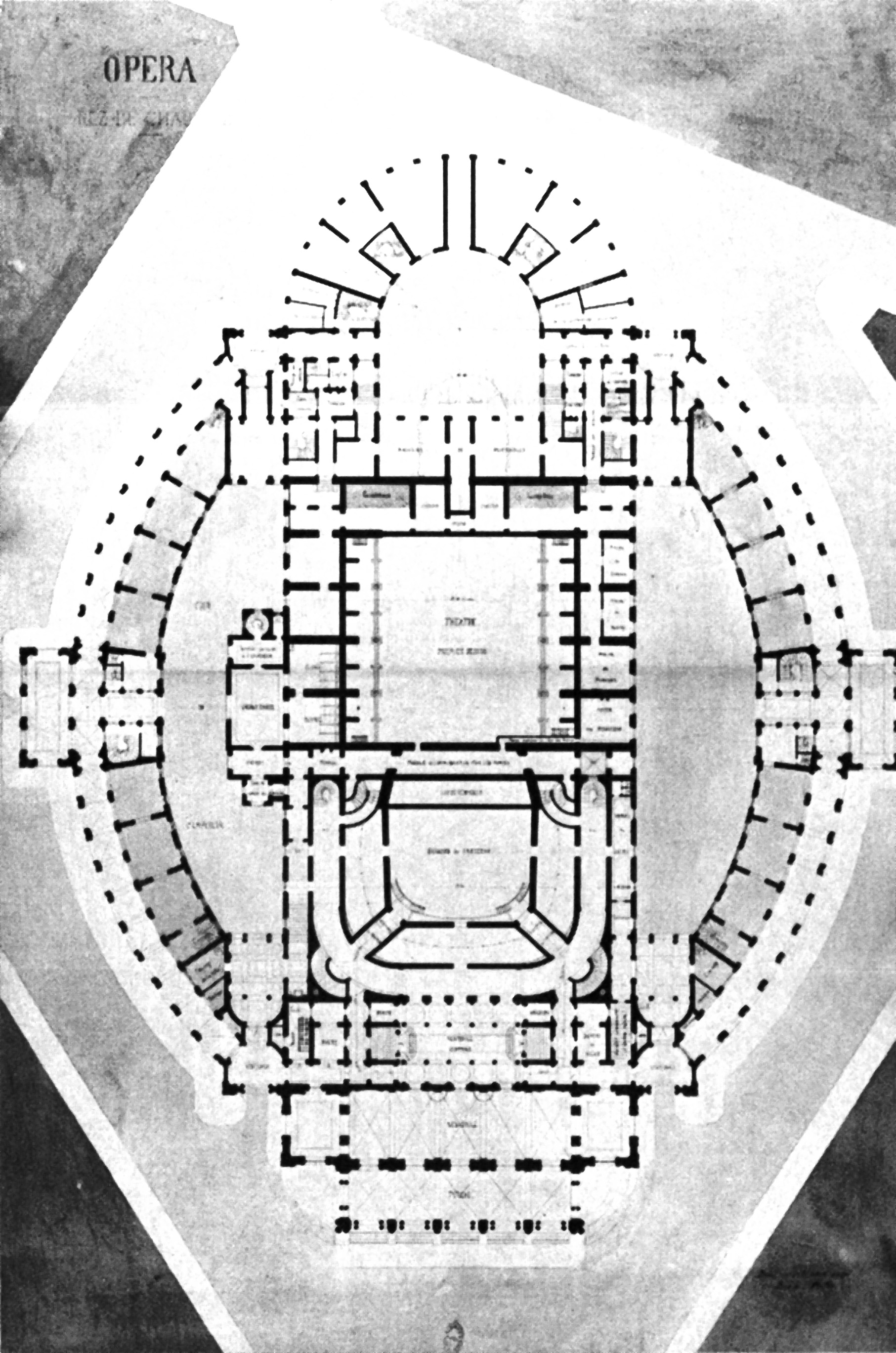
Plan

=== Design competition ===
On 30 December 1860 the Second Empire of Emperor Napoleon III officially announced an architectural design competition for the design of the new opera house.

Applicants were given a month to submit entries. There were two phases to the competition. Charles Garnier's project was one of about 170 submitted in the first phase. Each of the entrants was required to submit a motto that summarised their design. Garnier's was the quote "Bramo assai, poco spero" ("Hope for much, expect little") from the Italian poet Torquato Tasso. Garnier's project was awarded the fifth-place prize, and he became one of seven finalists selected for the second phase. In addition to Garnier, among the others were his friend Leon Ginain, Alphonse-Nicolas Crépinet and Joseph-Louis Duc (who subsequently withdrew due to other commitments). To the surprise of many, both Viollet-le-Duc and Charles Rohault de Fleury missed out.

Viollet-de-Duc's losing Opera Competition project of 1861

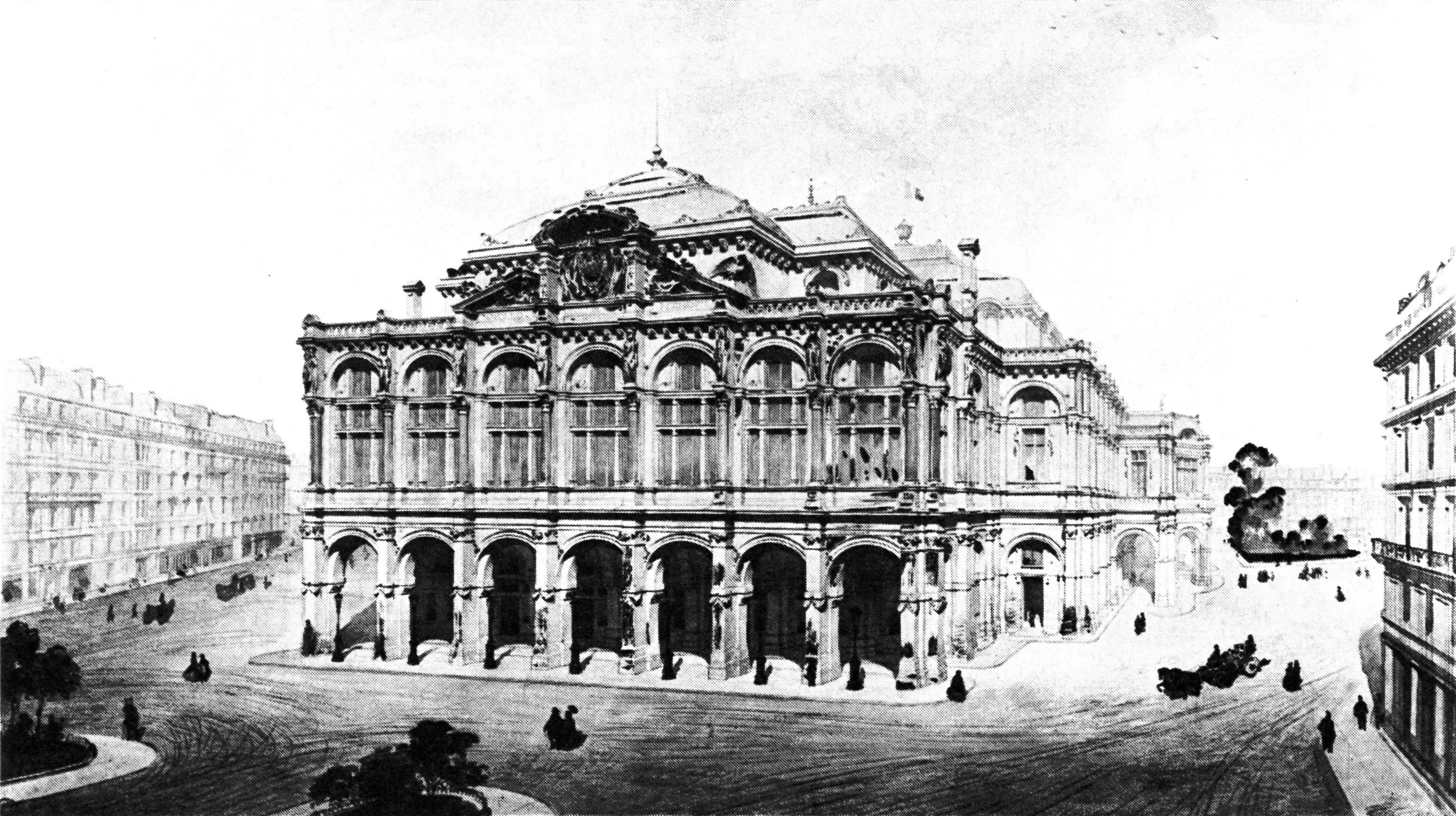
Perspective view

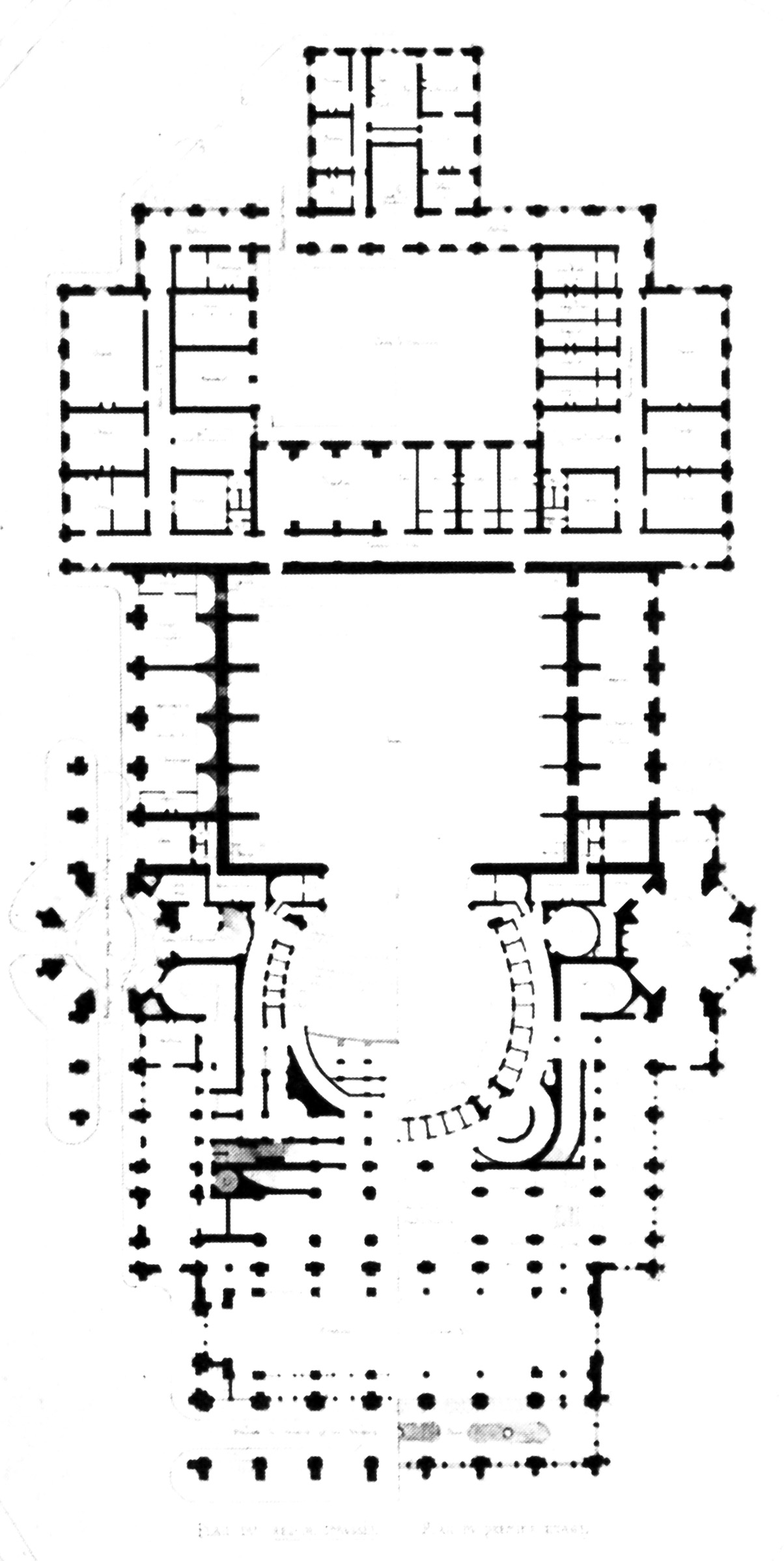
Plan

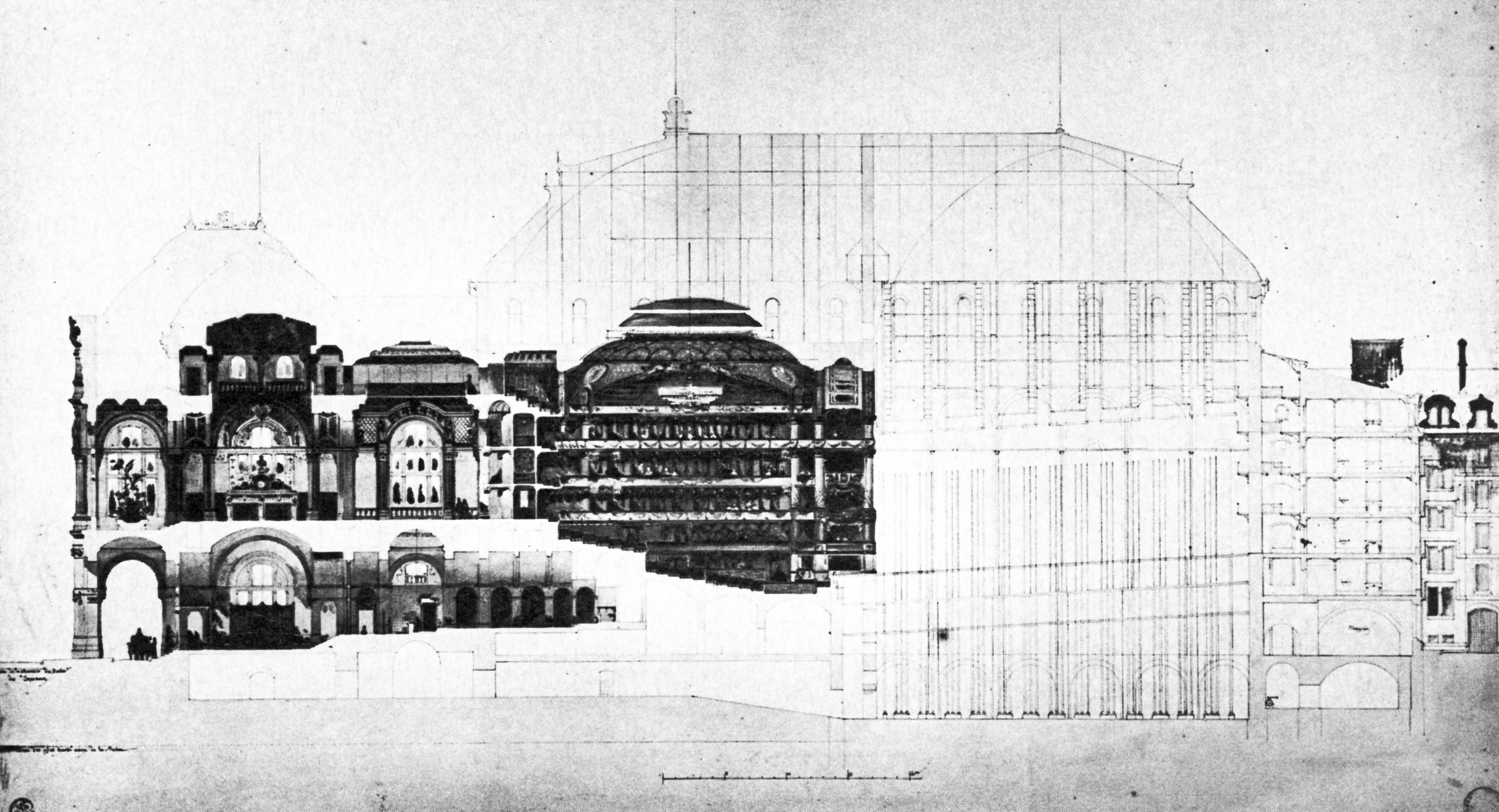
Long section

The second phase required the contestants to revise their original projects and was more rigorous, with a 58-page program, written by the director of the Opéra, Alphonse Royer, which the contestants received on 18 April. The new submissions were sent to the jury in the middle of May, and on 29 May 1861 Garnier's project was selected for its "rare and superior qualities in the beautiful distribution of the plans, the monumental and characteristic aspect of the façades and sections".

Garnier's wife Louise later wrote that the French architect Alphonse de Gisors, who was on the jury, had commented to them that Garnier's project was "remarkable in its simplicity, clarity, logic, grandeur, and because of the exterior dispositions which distinguish the plan in three distinct parts—the public spaces, auditorium, and stage ... 'you have greatly improved your project since the first competition; whereas Ginain [the first-place winner in the first phase] has ruined his.'"

Legend has it that the Emperor's wife, the Empress Eugénie, who was likely irritated that her own favoured candidate, Viollet-le-Duc, had not been selected, asked the relatively unknown Garnier: "What is this? It's not a style; it's neither Louis Quatorze, nor Louis Quinze, nor Louis Seize!" "Why Ma'am, it's Napoléon Trois" replied Garnier "and you're complaining!" Andrew Ayers has written that Garnier's definition "remains undisputed, so much does the Palais Garnier seem emblematic of its time and of the Second Empire that created it. A giddy mixture of up-to-the-minute technology, rather prescriptive rationalism, exuberant eclecticism and astonishing opulence, Garnier's opera encapsulated the divergent tendencies and political and social ambitions of its era." Ayers goes on to say that the judges of the competition in particular admired Garnier's design for "the clarity of his plan, which was a brilliant example of the beaux-arts design methods in which both he and they were thoroughly versed".

=== Opéra Agence ===
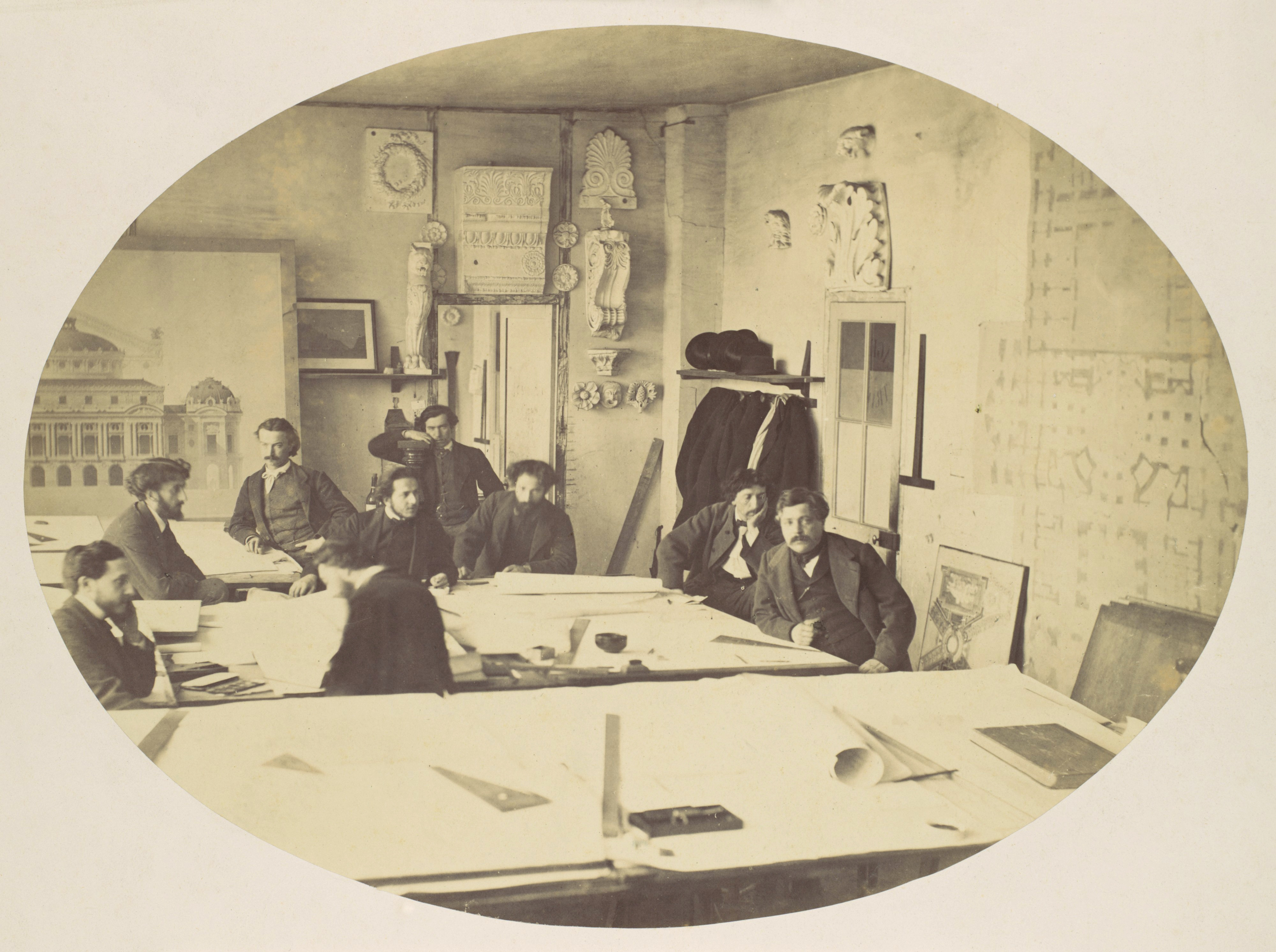
The Opéra Agence drafting room: Garnier is second from the right, with Edmond Le Deschault on the far right, and Victor Louvet, second from the left

After the initial funds to begin construction were voted on 2 July 1861, Garnier established the Opéra Agence, his office on the construction site, and hired a team of architects and draftsmen. He selected as his second-in-command, Louis-Victor Louvet, followed by Jean Jourdain and Edmond Le Deschault.

=== Laying of the foundation ===
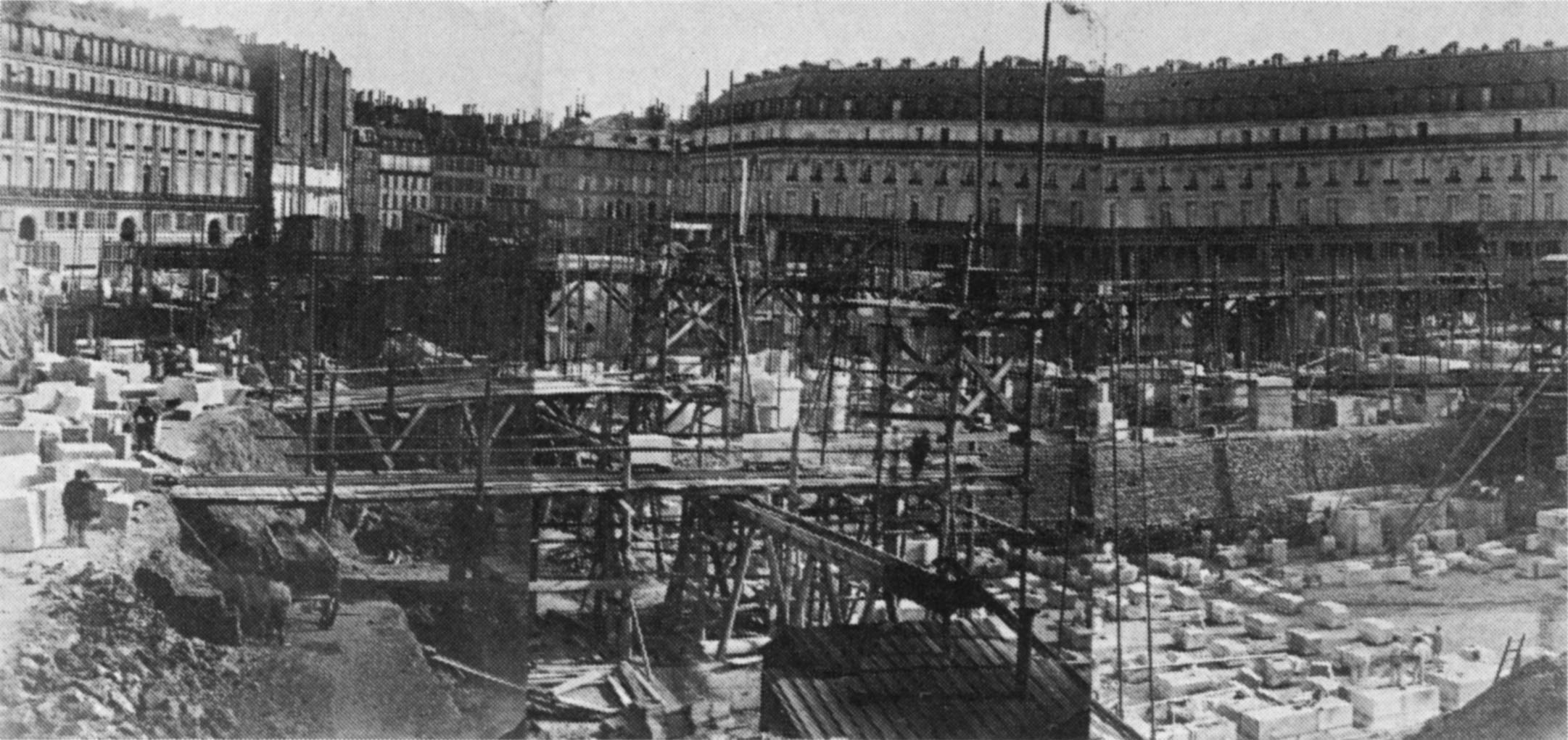
Foundation work (20 May 1862)

The site was excavated between 27 August and 31 December 1861. On 13 January 1862 the first concrete foundations were poured, starting at the front and progressing sequentially toward the back, with the laying of the substructure masonry beginning as soon as each section of concrete was cast. The opera house needed a much deeper basement in the substage area than other building types, but the level of the groundwater was unexpectedly high. Wells were sunk in February 1862 and eight steam pumps installed in March, but despite operating continuously 24 hours a day, the site would not dry up. To deal with this problem Garnier designed a double foundation to protect the superstructure from moisture. It incorporated a water course and an enormous concrete cistern (cuve) which would both relieve the pressure of the external groundwater on the basement walls and serve as a reservoir in case of fire. A contract for its construction was signed on 20 June. Soon a persistent legend arose that the opera house was built over a subterranean lake, inspiring Gaston Leroux to incorporate the idea into his novel The Phantom of the Opera. On 21 July the cornerstone was laid at the southeast angle of the building's façade. In October the pumps were removed, the brick vault of the cuve was finished by 8 November, and the substructure was essentially complete by the end of the year.

=== Model ===
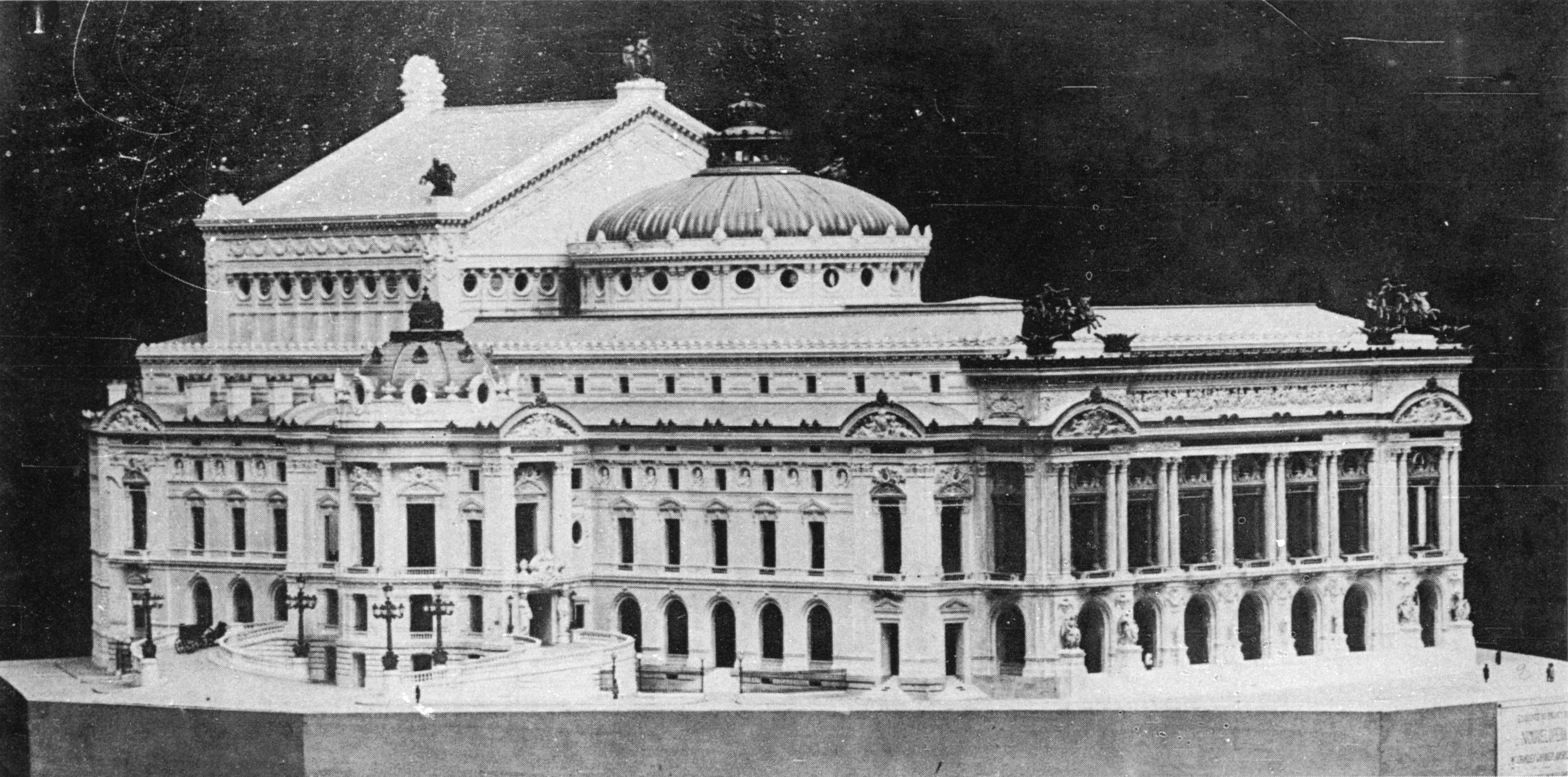
Villeminot model (May 1863)

The emperor expressed an interest in seeing a model of the building, and a plaster scale model (2 cm per meter) was constructed by Louis Villeminot between April 1862 and April 1863 at a cost of more than 8,000 francs. After previewing it, the emperor requested several changes to the design of the building, the most important of which was the suppression of a balustraded terrace with corner groups at the top of the façade and its replacement with a massive attic story fronted by a continuous frieze surmounted by imperial quadrigae over the end bays.

With the incorporated changes, the model was transported over specially installed rails to the Palais de l'Industrie for public display at the 1863 exhibition. Théophile Gautier wrote of the model (Le Moniteur Universel, 13 May 1863) that "the general arrangement becomes intelligible to all eyes and already acquires a sort of reality that better permits one to prejudge the final effect ... it attracts the crowd's curiosity; it is, in effect, the new Opéra seen through reversed opera glasses." The model is now lost, but it was photographed by J. B. Donas in 1863.

The emperor's quadrigae were never added, although they can be seen in the model. Instead Charles-Alphonse Guméry's gilded bronze sculptural groups Harmony and Poetry were installed in 1869. The linear frieze seen in the model was also redesigned with alternating low- and high-relief decorative medallions bearing the gilded letters from the imperial monogram ("N" for Napoléon, "E" for Empereur). The custom-designed letters were not ready in time for the unveiling and were replaced with commercially available substitutes. After the fall of the empire in 1870, Garnier was relieved to be able to remove them from the medallions. Letters in Garnier's original design were finally installed during the restoration of the building in 2000.

=== Change in name ===
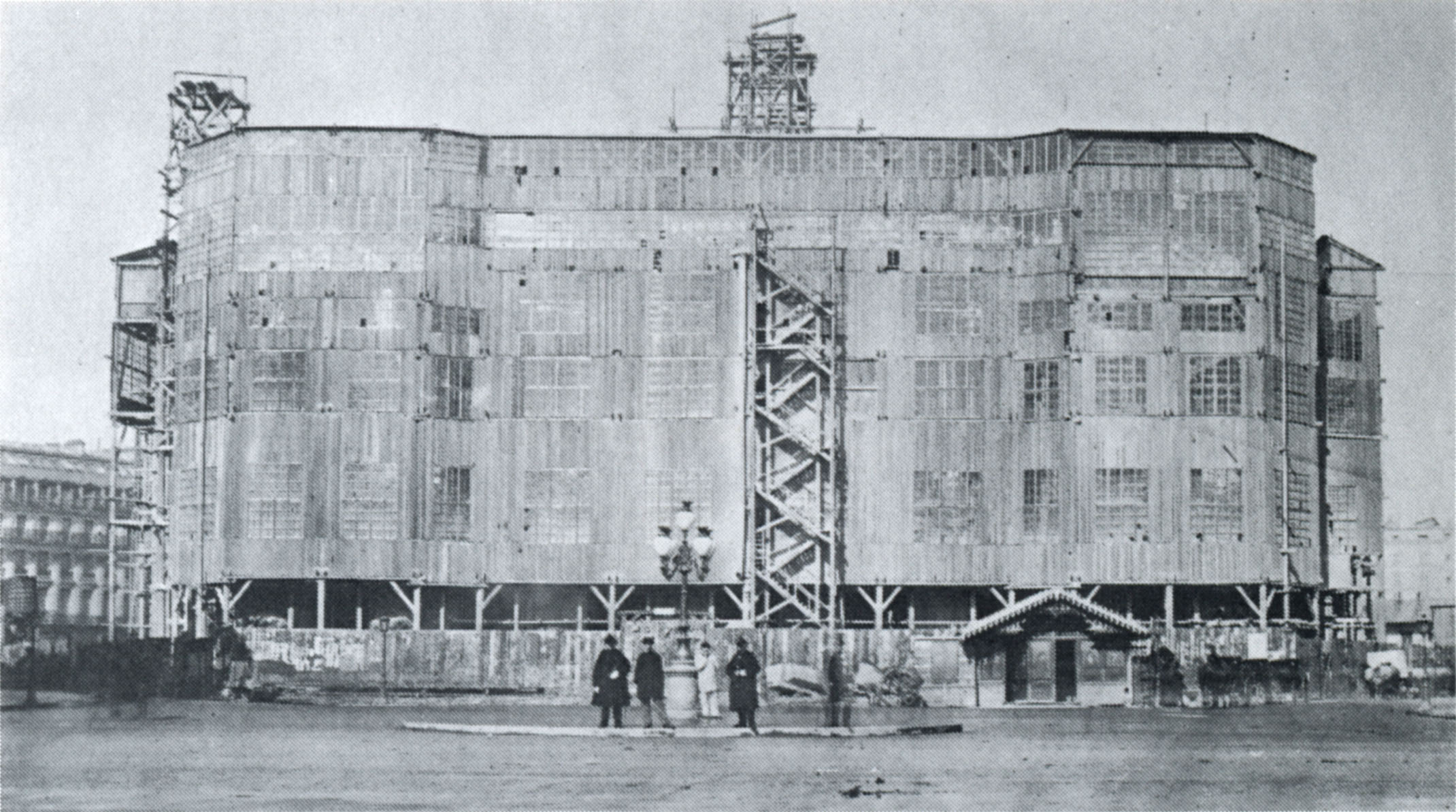
The façade in November 1866

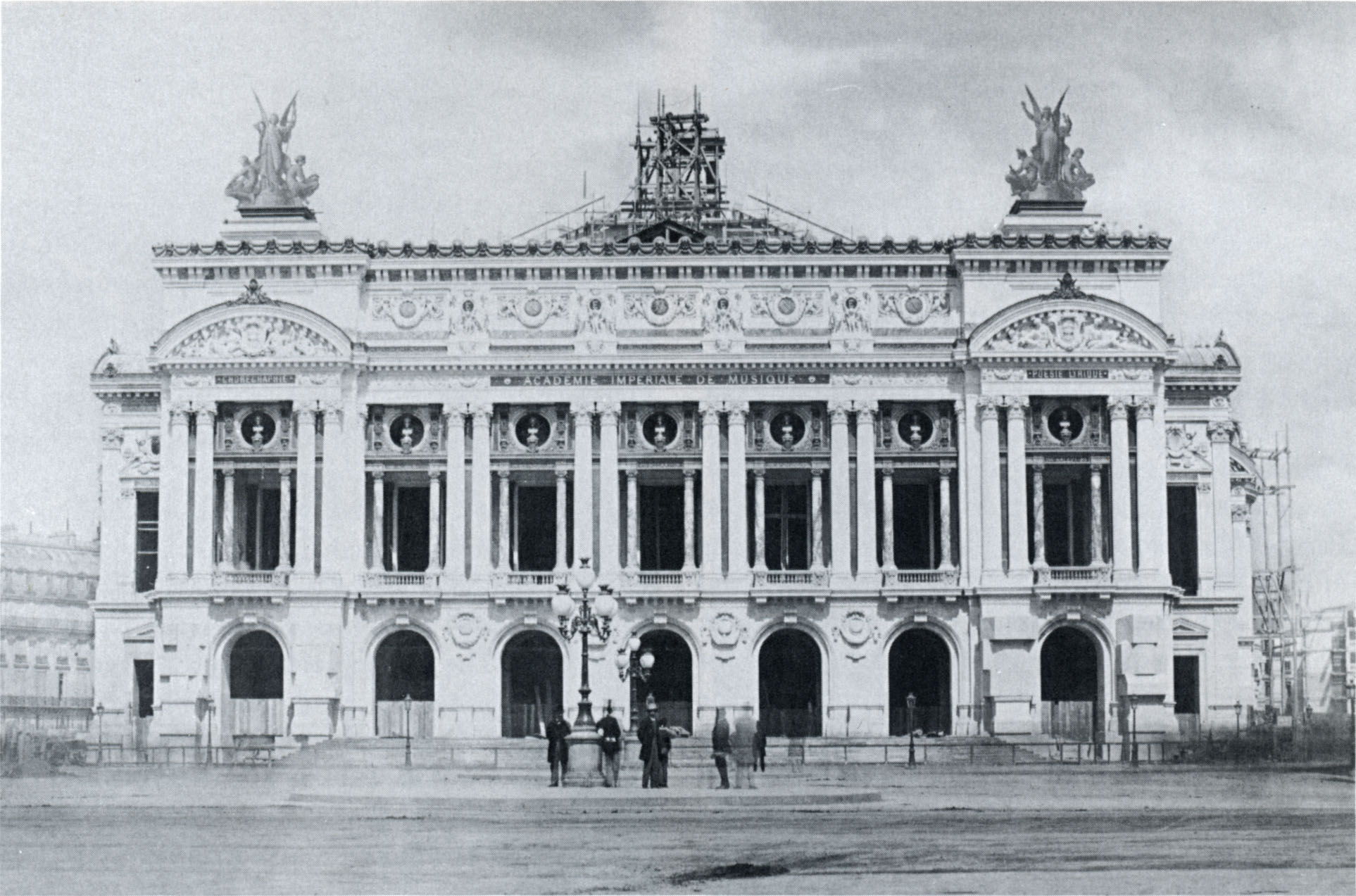
The façade on 15 August 1867

The scaffolding concealing the façade was removed on 15 August 1867 in time for the Paris Exposition of 1867. The official title of the Paris Opera was prominently displayed on the entablature of the giant Corinthian order of coupled columns fronting the main-floor loggia: "Académie Impériale de Musique". When the emperor was deposed on 4 September 1870 as a result of the disastrous Franco-Prussian War, the government was replaced by the Third Republic, and almost immediately, on 17 September 1870, the opera was renamed Théâtre National de l'Opéra, a name it kept until 1939. In spite of this, when it came time to change the name on the new opera house, only the first six letters of the word 'Impériale' were replaced, giving the now famous "Académie Nationale de Musique", an official title which had actually only been used during the approximately two-year period of the Second Republic which had preceded the Second Empire.

=== 1870–1871 ===
All work on the building came to a halt during the Franco-Prussian War due to the siege of Paris (September 1870 – January 1871). Construction had so advanced that parts of the building could be used as a food warehouse and a hospital. After France's defeat Garnier became seriously ill from the deprivations of the siege and left Paris from March to June to recover on the Ligurian coast of Italy, while his assistant Louis Louvet remained behind during the turmoil of the Paris Commune which followed. Louvet wrote several letters to Garnier, which document events relating to the building. Because of the theatre's proximity to the fighting at the Place Vendôme, troops of the National Guard bivouacked there and were in charge of its defence and distributing food to soldiers and civilians. The Commune authorities planned to replace Garnier with another architect, but this unnamed man had not yet appeared when Republican troops ousted the National Guard and gained control over the building on 23 May. By the end of the month the Commune had been severely defeated. The Third Republic had become sufficiently well established by the fall, that on 30 September construction work recommenced, and by late October a small amount of funds were voted by the new legislature for further construction.

=== 1872–1873 ===
The political leaders of the new government maintained an intense dislike of all things associated with the Second Empire, and many of them regarded the essentially apolitical Garnier as a holdover from that regime. This was especially true during the presidency of Adolphe Thiers who remained in office until May 1873, but also persisted under his successor Marshal MacMahon. Economies were demanded, and Garnier was forced to suppress the completion of sections of the building, in particular the Pavillon de l'Empereur (which later became the home of the Opera Library Museum). However, on 28–29 October an overwhelming incentive to complete the new theatre came when the Salle Le Peletier was destroyed by a fire which raged the entire night. Garnier was immediately instructed to complete the building as soon as possible.

=== Completion ===
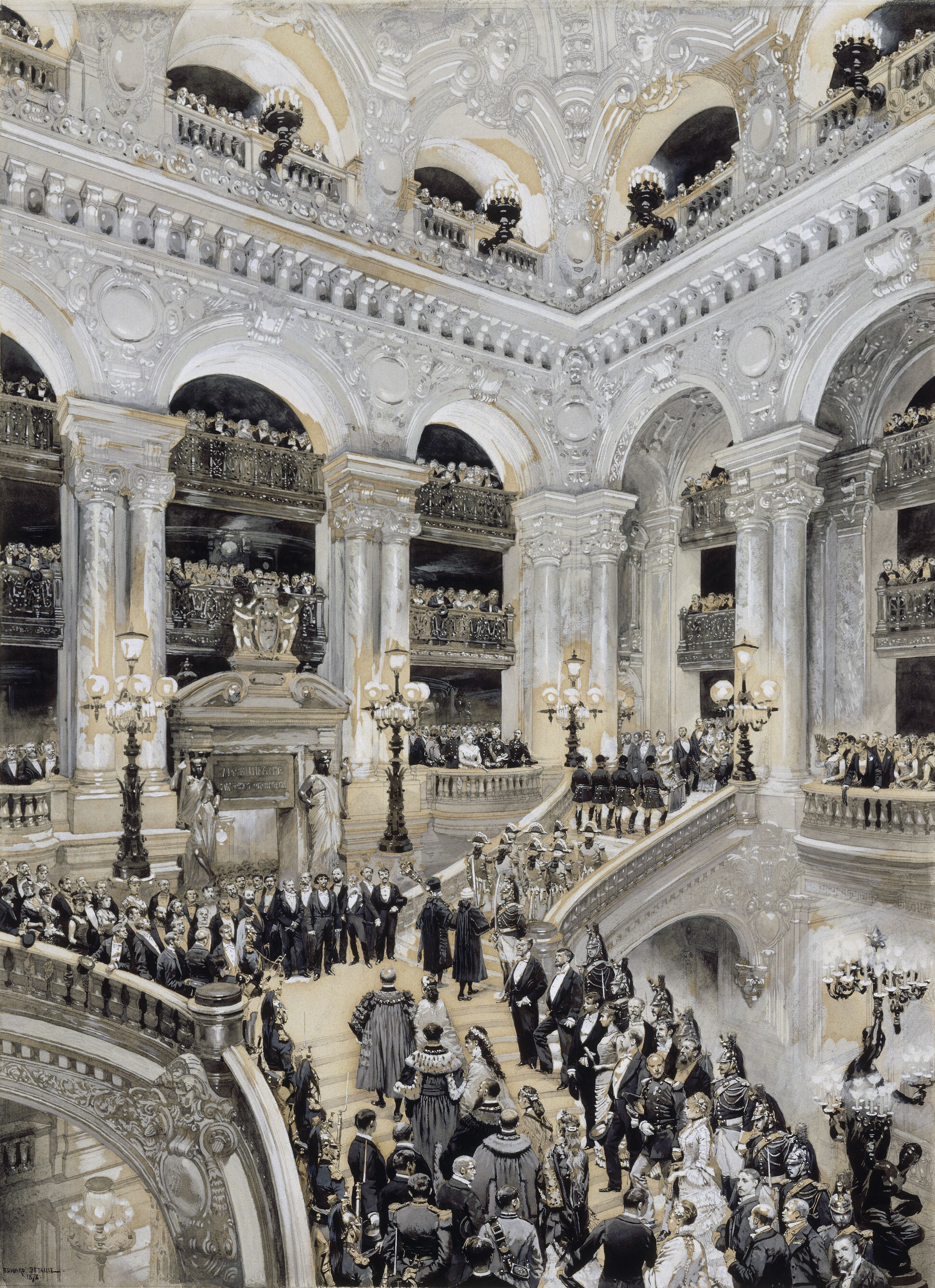
Inauguration of the Paris Opera in 1875 (Édouard Detaille, 1878)

The cost of completion of the new house during 1874 was more than 7.5 million francs, a sum that greatly exceeded the amounts spent in any of the previous thirteen years. The cash-strapped government of the Third Republic resorted to borrowing 4.9 million gold francs at an interest rate of six percent from François Blanc, the wealthy financier who managed the Monte Carlo Casino. Subsequently (from 1876 to 1879) Garnier would oversee the design and construction of the Monte Carlo Casino concert hall, the Salle Garnier, which later became the home of the Opéra de Monte Carlo.

During 1874 Garnier and his construction team worked feverishly to complete the new Paris opera house, and by 17 October the orchestra was able to conduct an acoustical test of the new auditorium, followed by another on 2 December which was attended by officials, guests, and members of the press. The Paris Opera Ballet danced on the stage on 12 December, and six days later the famous chandelier was lit for the first time.

The theatre was formally inaugurated on 5 January 1875 with a lavish gala performance attended by Marshal MacMahon, the Lord Mayor of London and King Alfonso XII of Spain. The program included the overtures to Auber's La muette de Portici and Rossini's William Tell, the first two acts of Fromental Halévy's 1835 opera La Juive (with Gabrielle Krauss in the title role), along with "The Consecration of the Swords" from Meyerbeer's 1836 opera Les Huguenots and the 1866 ballet La source with music by Delibes and Minkus. As a soprano had fallen ill one act from Charles Gounod's Faust and one from Ambroise Thomas's Hamlet had to be omitted. During the intermission Garnier stepped out onto the landing of the grand staircase to receive the approving applause of the audience.

=== History of the house since opening ===
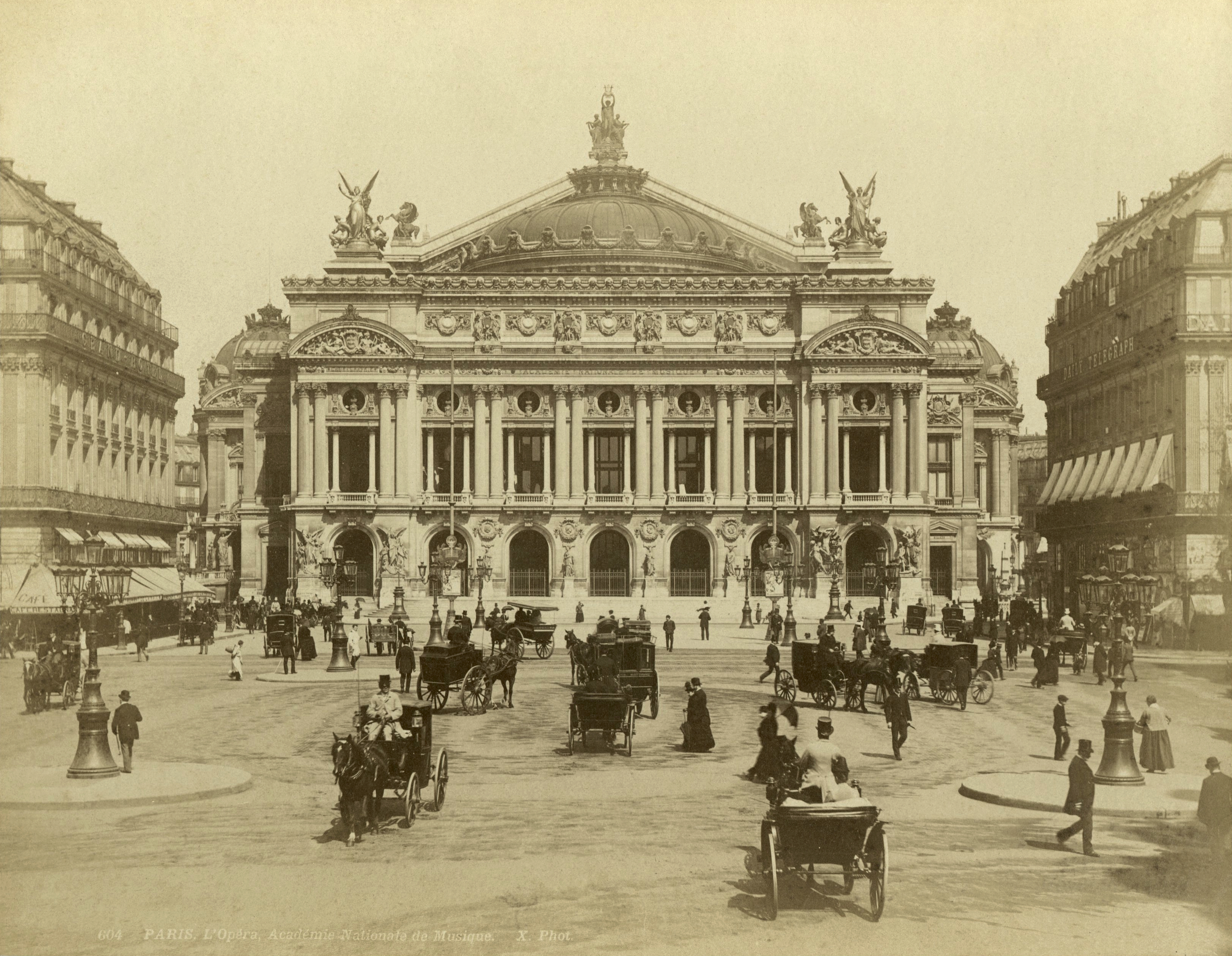
View of the front, c. 1890

In 1881 electric lighting was installed. In the 1950s new personnel and freight elevators were installed at the rear of stage, to facilitate the movement of employees in the administration building and the moving of stage scenery.

In 1969, the theatre was given new electrical facilities and, during 1978, part of the original Foyer de la Danse was converted into new rehearsal space for the Ballet company by the architect Jean-Loup Roubert. During 1994, restoration work began on the theatre. This consisted of modernizing the stage machinery and electrical facilities, while restoring and preserving the opulent décor, as well as strengthening the structure and foundation of the building. This restoration was completed in 2007.

== Influence ==
The Palais Garnier inspired many other buildings over the following years, including:

- Teatro Massimo Bellini built from 1870 to 1890 in Catania, Sicily (Italy).
- The Amazon Theatre in Manaus (Brazil) built from 1884 to 1896. The overview is very similar, though the decoration is simpler.
- The Thomas Jefferson Building, built from 1890 to 1897, of the Library of Congress in Washington, D.C. is modelled after the Palais Garnier, most notably the façade and Great Hall.
- The Opéra-Comique's Salle Favart, which opened in 1898, is an adaptation of Garnier's design on a smaller scale to fit a restricted site.
- Several buildings in Poland were based on the design of the Palais Garnier. These include the Juliusz Słowacki Theatre in Kraków, built during 1893, and also the Warsaw Philharmonic edifice in Warsaw, built between 1900 and 1901.
- The Hanoi Opera House in Vietnam was built 1901–1911 during French Indochina colonial period based upon Palais Garnier. It is considered a representative French colonial architectural monument in Indochina.
- The Theatro Municipal do Rio de Janeiro (1905–1909) was also modelled after Palais Garnier, particularly the Great Hall and stairs.
- The Legends Hotel Chennai in India is inspired by the Palais Garnier, especially the façade and statues.
- The Façade of the Rialto Theatre, a former movie palace built in 1923–1924 and located in Montreal, Quebec, Canada, was designed after Palais Garnier.
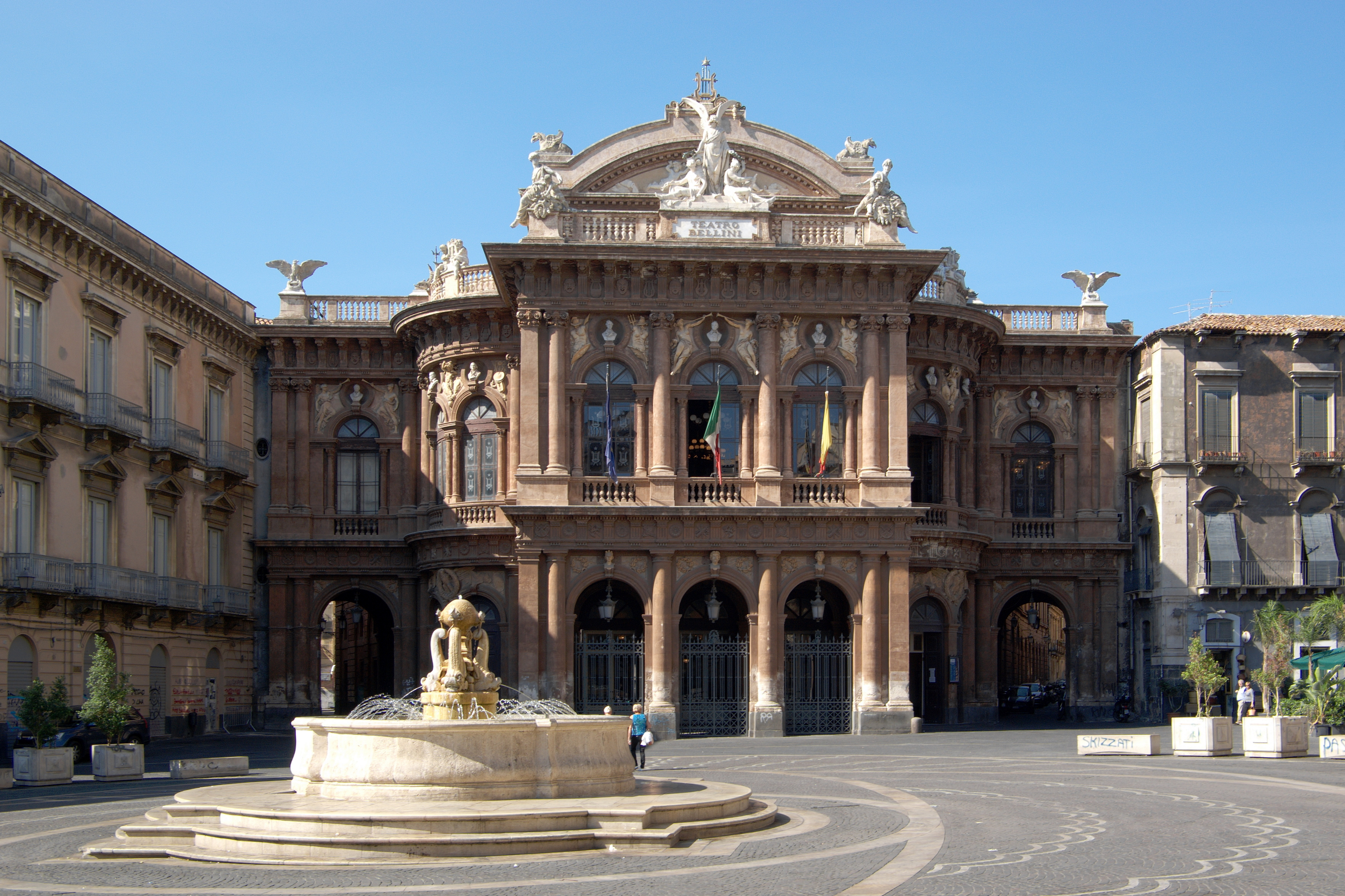
Piazza Vincenzo Bellini and the adjoining Teatro Massimo Bellini (built from 1870 to 1890 in Catania, Sicily)

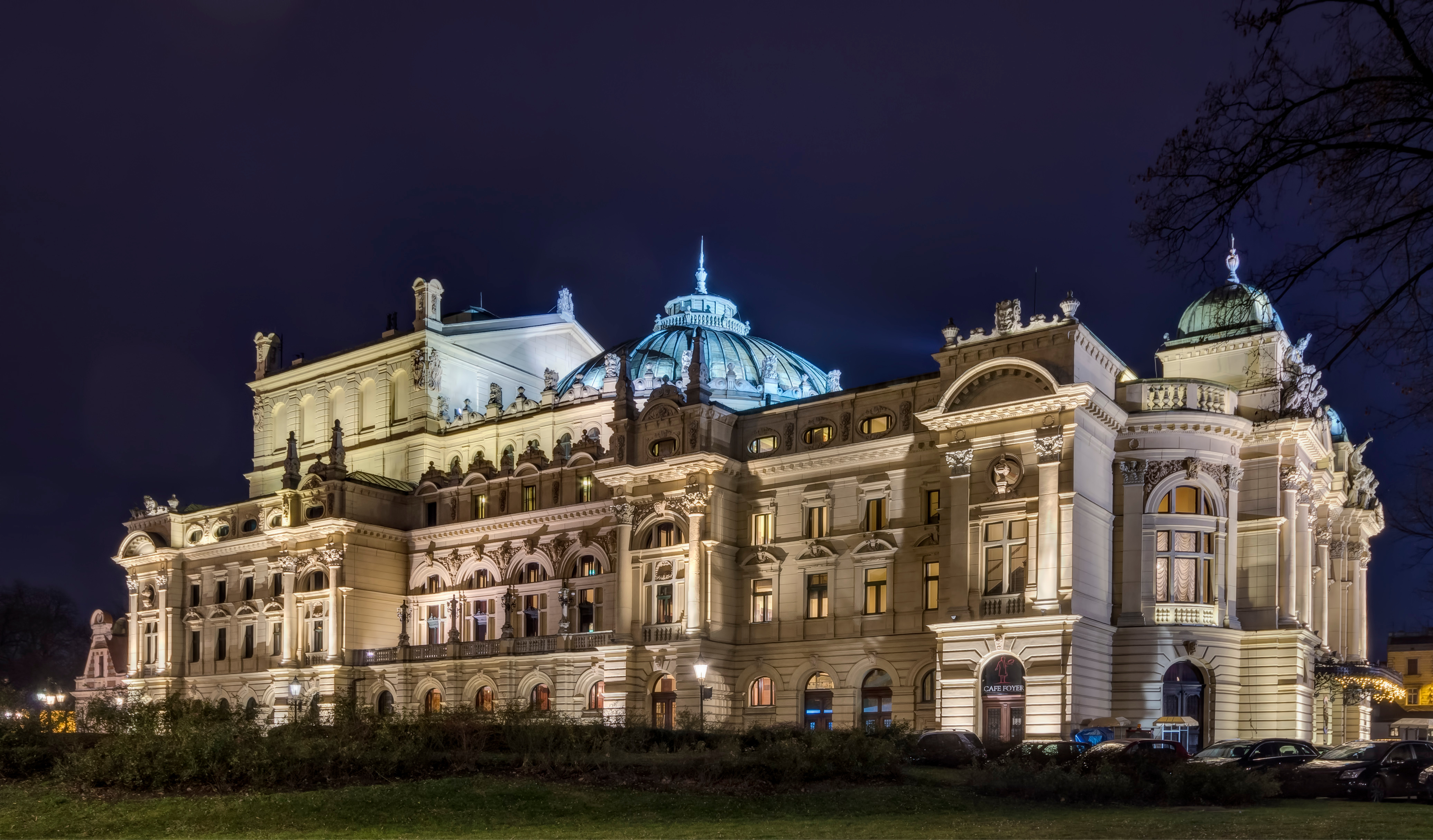
Juliusz Słowacki Theatre, Kraków, Poland (opened 1893)

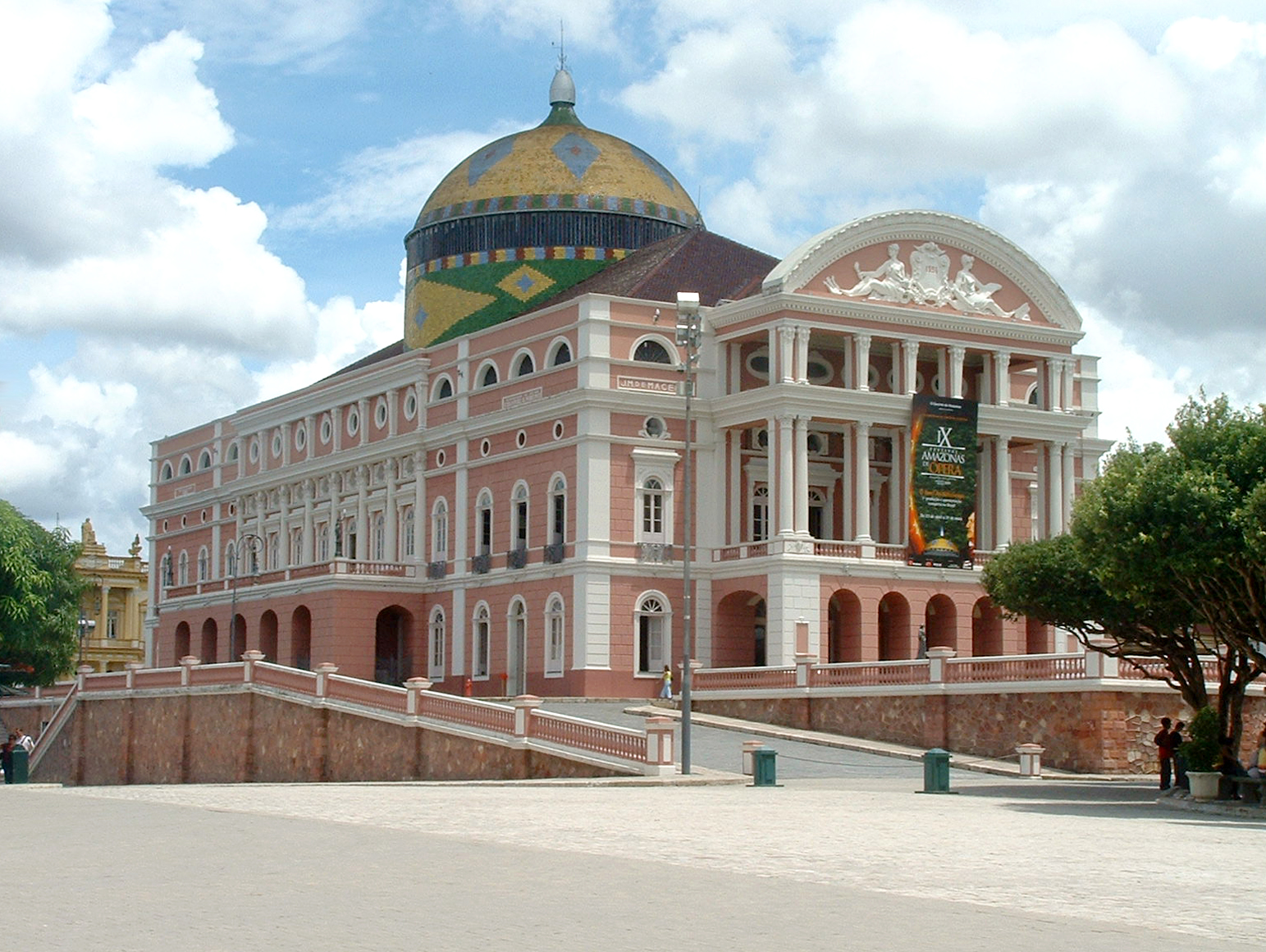
The Amazonas theatre in Manaus, Brazil (1884–1896)

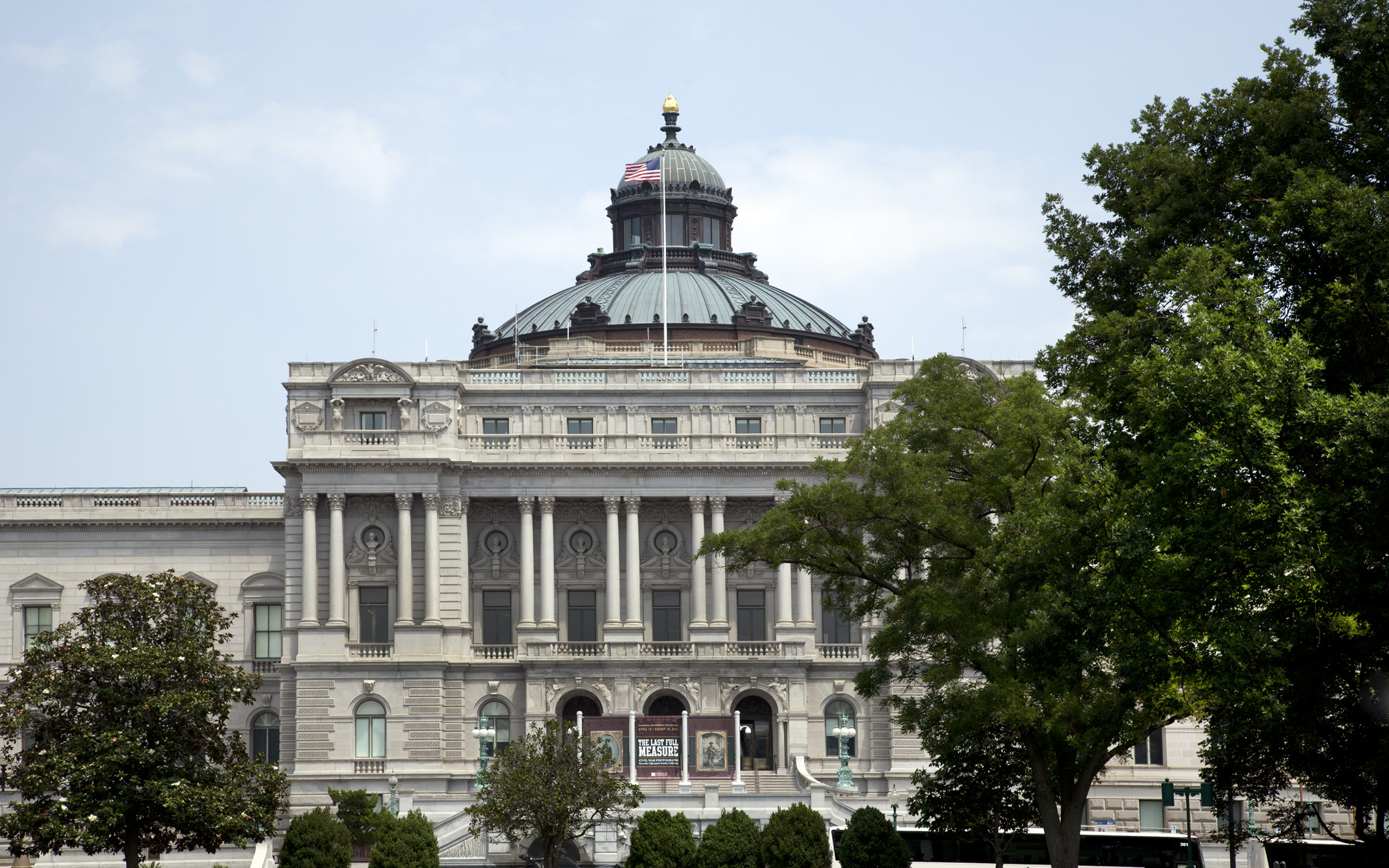
The Thomas Jefferson Building at the Library of Congress (1890–1897)

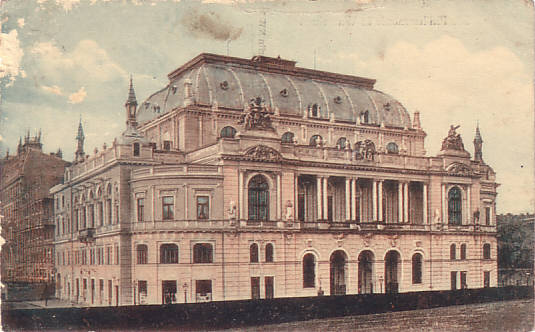
The former Warsaw Philharmonic Hall (1900–1901)

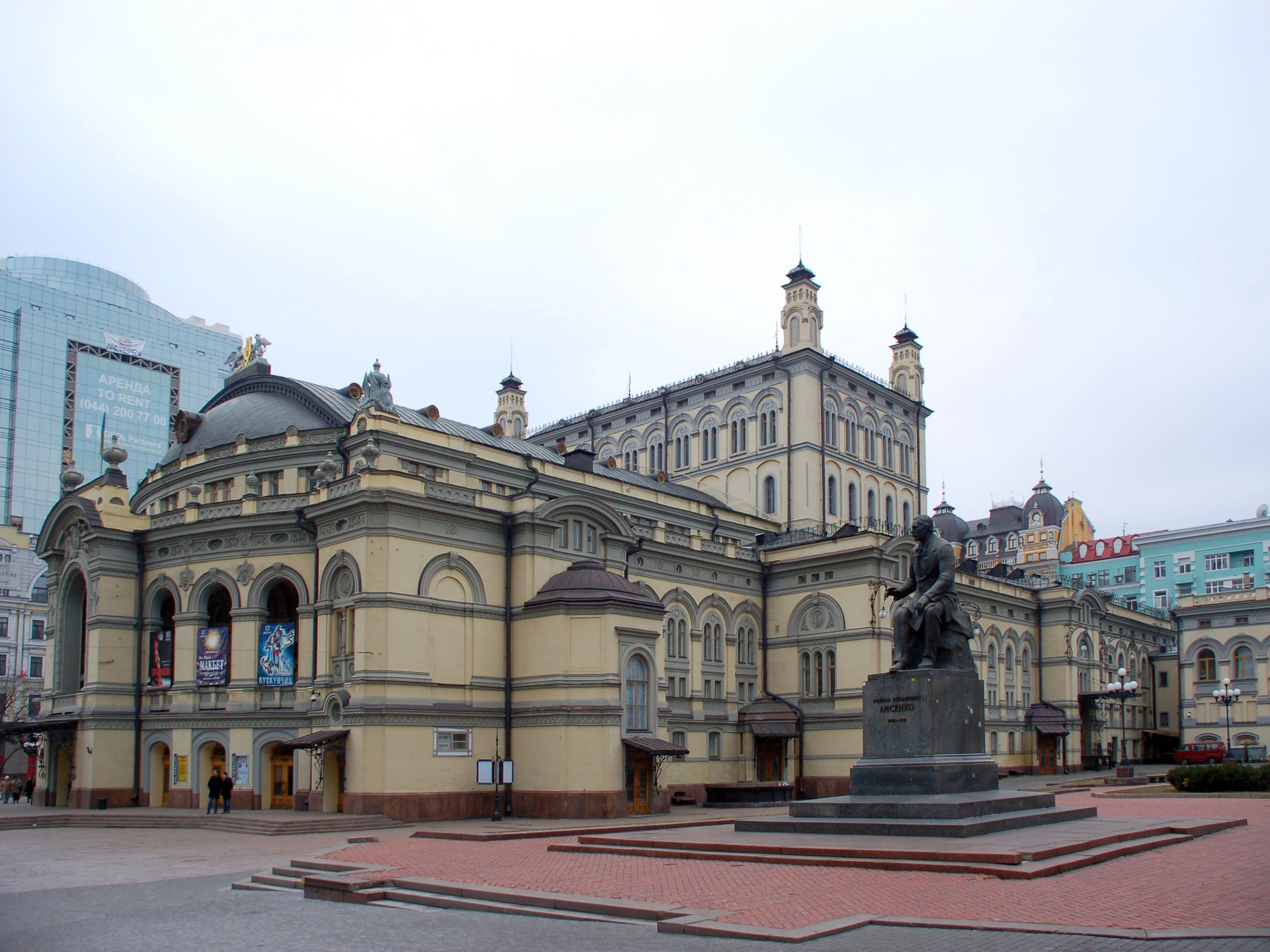
National Opera House of Ukraine (opened 1901)

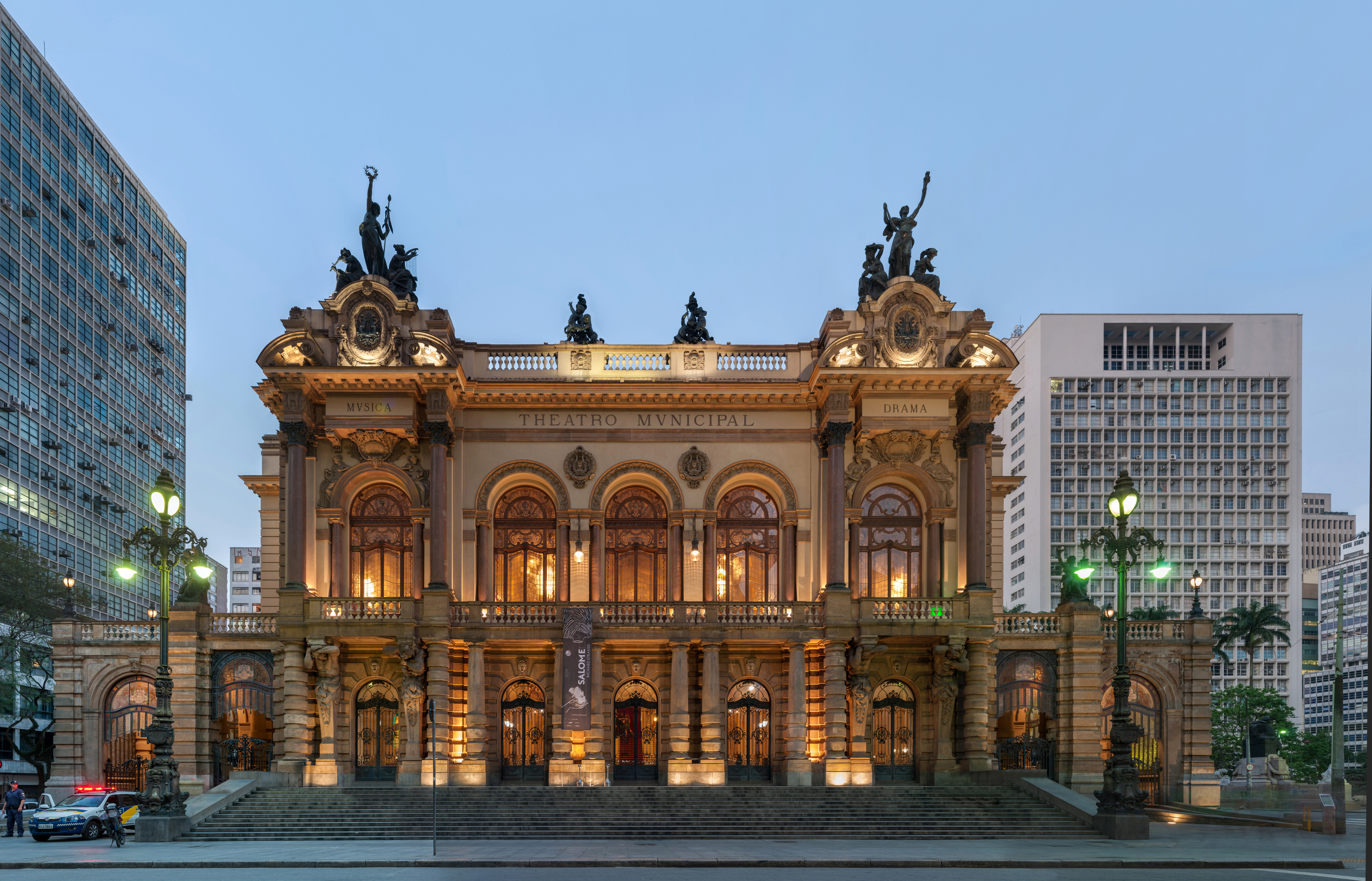
Municipal Theater of São Paulo (built 1903–1911)

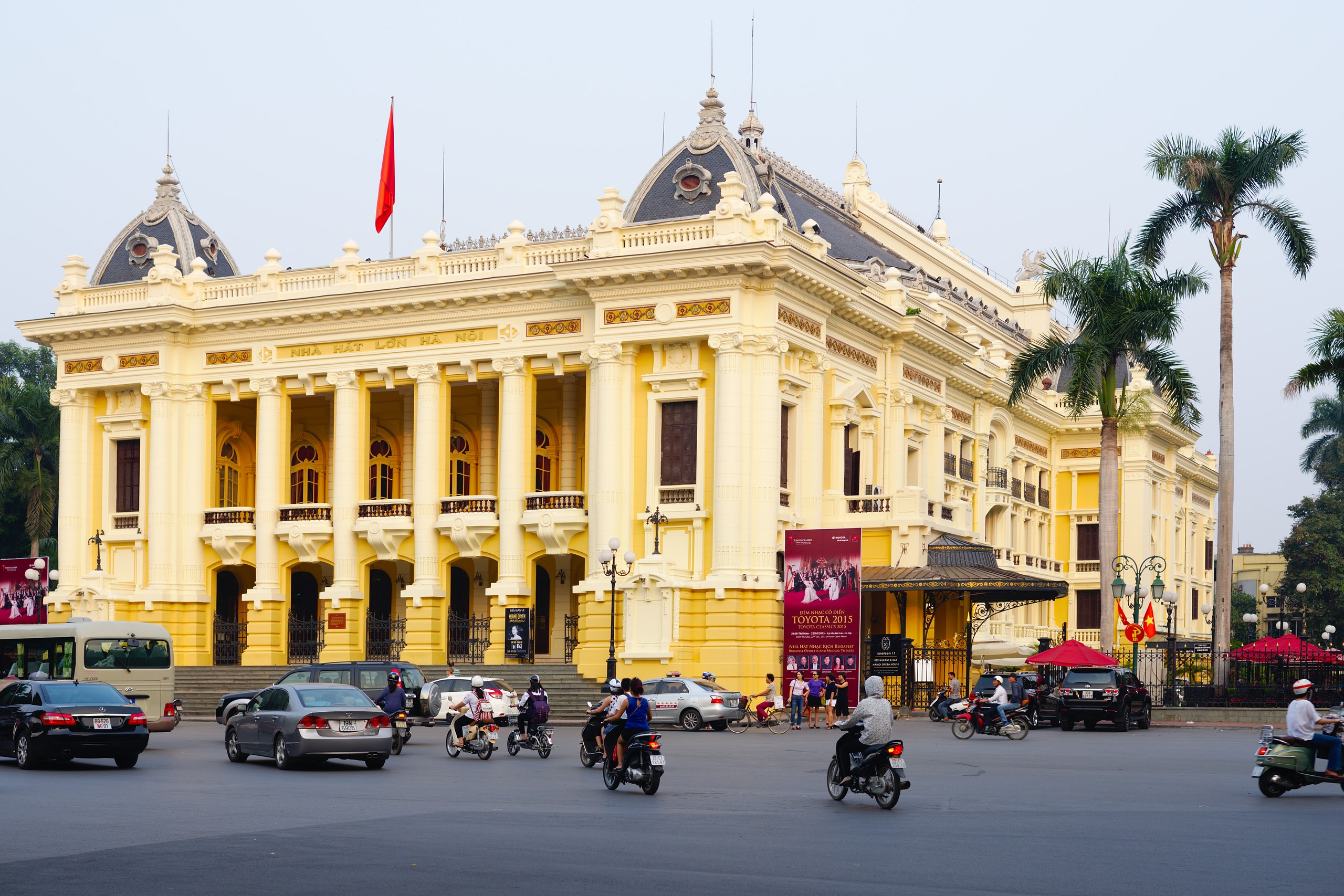
Hanoi Opera House (1901–1911)

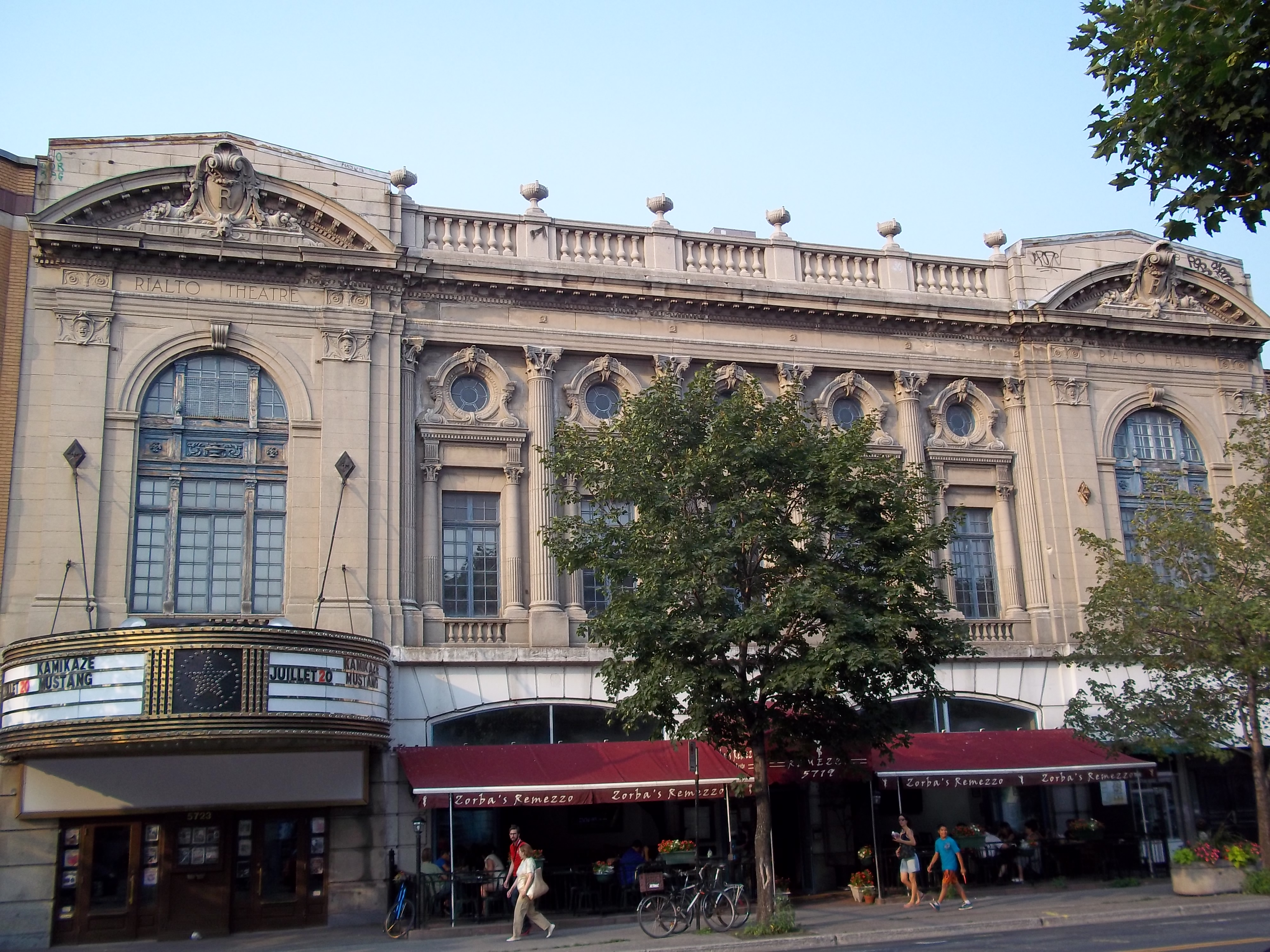
Rialto Theatre in Montreal (1923–1924)

== See also ==
- Napoleon III style
- Bibliothèque-Musée de l'Opéra National de Paris
- Opéra National de Paris
- Paris Opera Ballet
- The works of Paul Dubois- French sculptor
- Salle Le Peletier
- The Phantom of the Opera
- Listing of the works of Alexandre Falguière
- List of works by Henri Chapu
- French opera
- List of tourist attractions in Paris
