= Topolowa Street, Kraków =

Street in Kraków, Poland

Topolowa Street
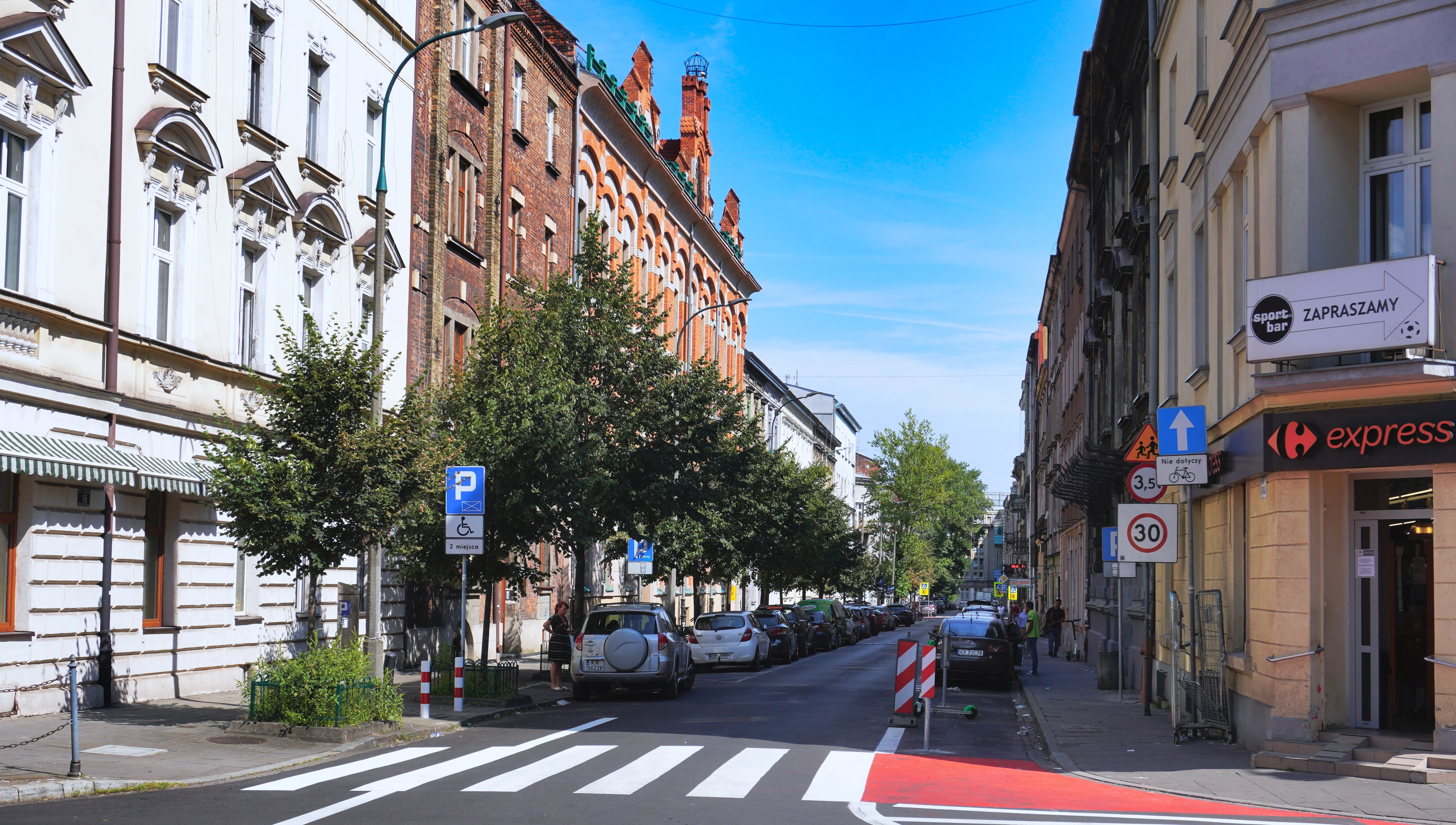
- View of the street
- Interactive map of Topolowa Street
- Owner: City of Kraków
- Location: Grzegórzki, Kraków, Poland

Topolowa Street is a street in Kraków, in District II Grzegórzki in Wesoła.

It connects the eastern side of Kraków Główny railway station, starting at the intersection with Bosacka Street, to the area of Mogilskie Roundabout.

== History ==
The street was laid out in 1801, following the route of an old road leading from Kleparz, near St. Florian's Church, to Mogiła. At that time, it was called Mogilska Street, and later Strzelecka Street. It served as the main connection between the city and Rakowicki Cemetery.

After 1847, due to the construction of the railway station, the street was divided into two parts—the former western section became today's Kurniki Street. As a result, the street lost its previous significance, primarily in favor of Lubicz and Rakowicka Streets, which became the main routes to the cemetery. The street took its current form around 1878.

Between 1906 and 1910, Józef Piłsudski lived at numbers 24, 16, and 18. During the Nazi occupation, performances of Tadeusz Kantor's Independent Theatre were held in the apartment of Tadeusz Brzozowski on Topolowa Street.

The street name was given around 1880, most likely in reference to the poplar trees that lined the road to the cemetery.

== Buildings ==
The street's buildings mainly consist of two- and three-story tenement houses, predominantly in eclectic and modernist styles.

- 5 Topolowa Street – Mańkowski Palace. Designed by Józef Sowiński and Władysław Kaczmarski, 1901–1903. From 1954 to 1990, it housed the Lenin Museum.
- 6 Topolowa Street – Tenement house in an eclectic-Art Nouveau style, designed by Leopold Tlachna, 1907.
- 18 Topolowa Street – Tenement house in a historicist style, designed by Jan Sas-Zubrzycki, 1889–1890. A plaque commemorating Józef Piłsudski is embedded in its façade.
- 20–22 Topolowa Street – Former building of the St. Anne Women's Division School in a historicist Art Nouveau style, designed by Jan Zawiejski, 1903–1906.
- 36 Topolowa Street – Tenement house in a Neo-Renaissance style, designed by Józef Weinberger and Karol Janecki, 1893.
- 46 Topolowa Street – Tenement house in a modernist style, designed by Adam Czunko and Władysław Kleinberger, 1910. Above the gate, there is a stained-glass window depicting a landscape with poplar trees.
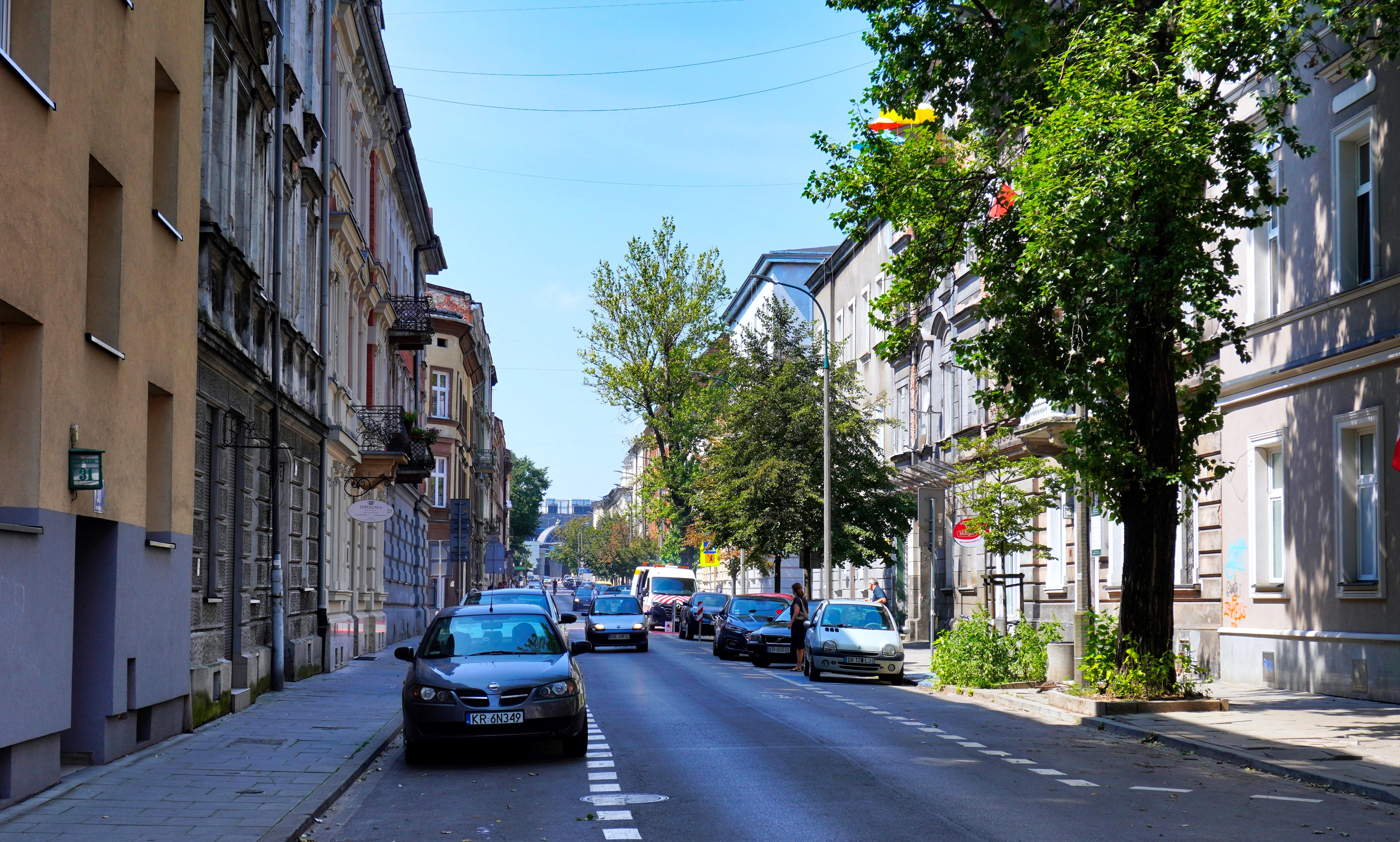
View of the street towards the west

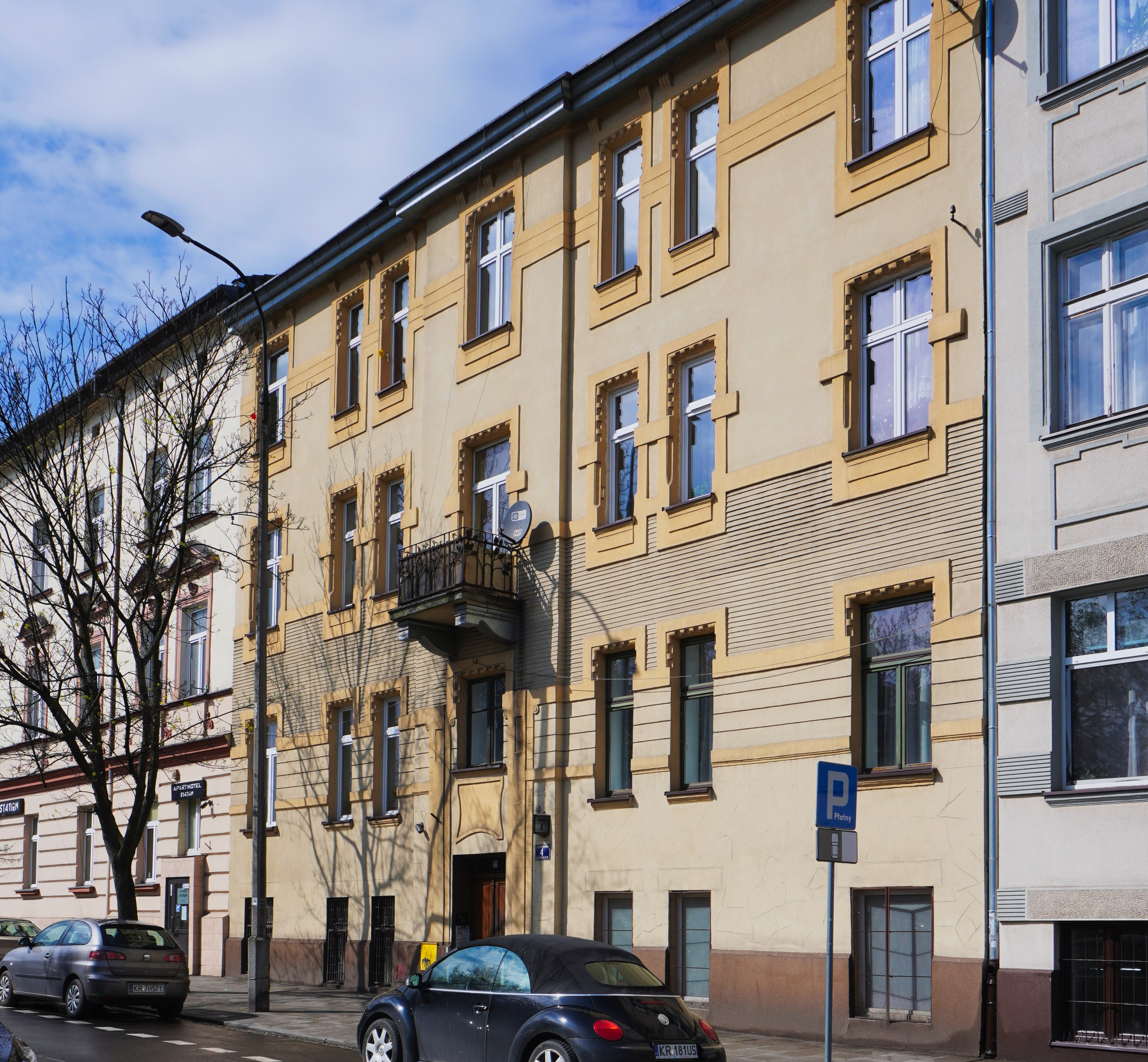
4 Topolowa Street
Tenement house (design. Leopold Tlachna, 1907)

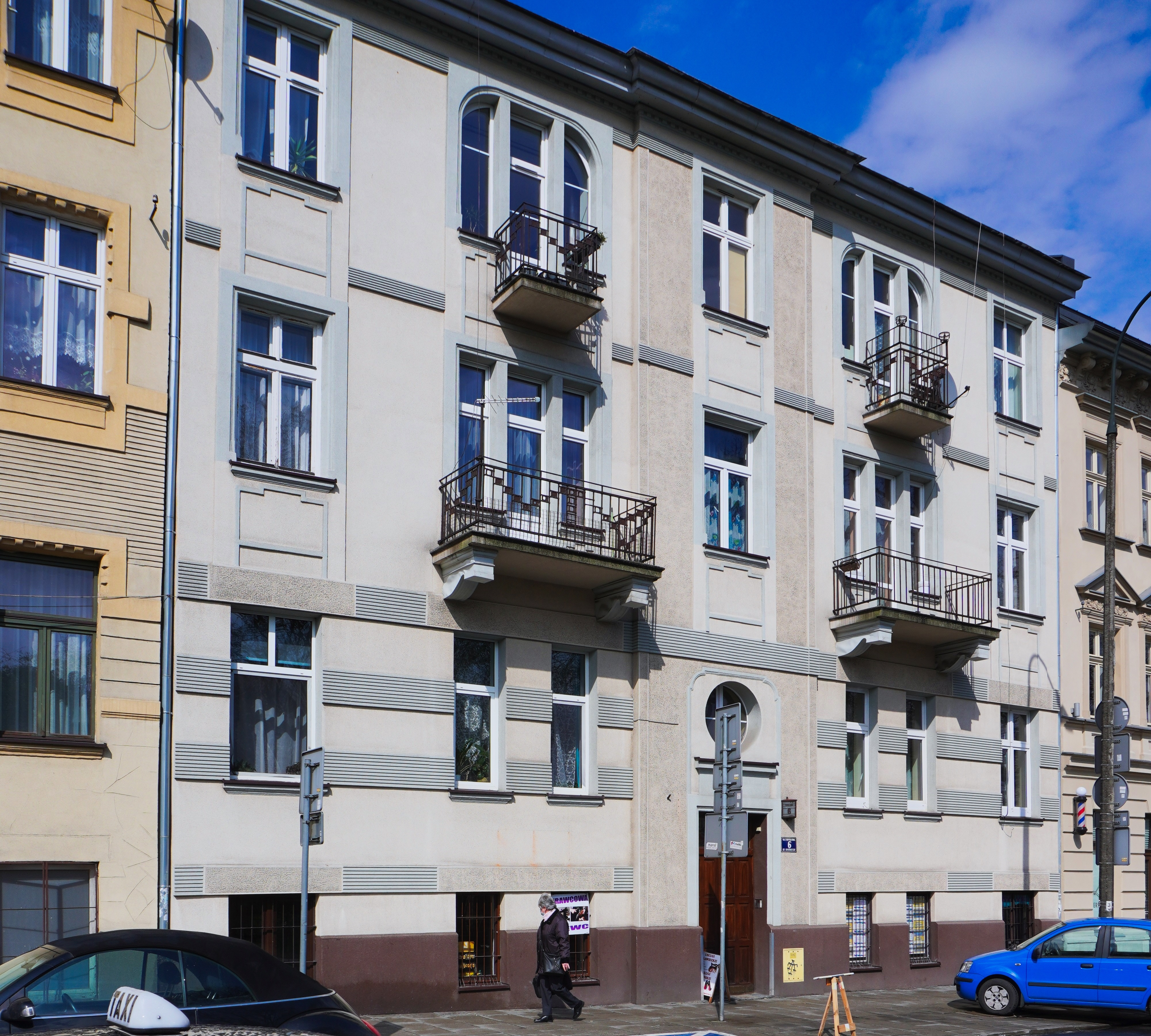
6 Topolowa Street
Tenement house (design. Leopold Tlachna, 1907)

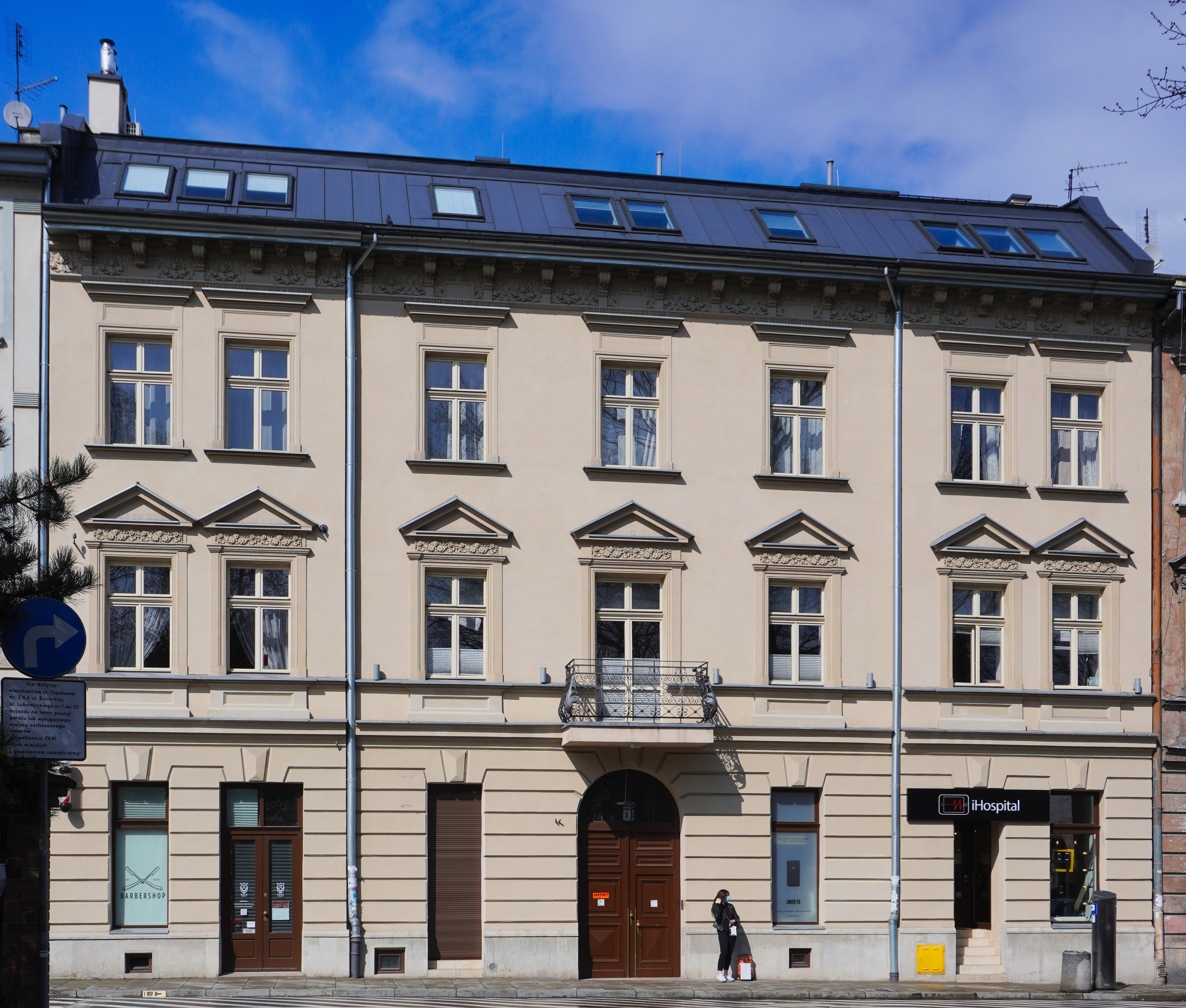
8 Topolowa Street
Tenement house (design. Adam Dębski, 1896)

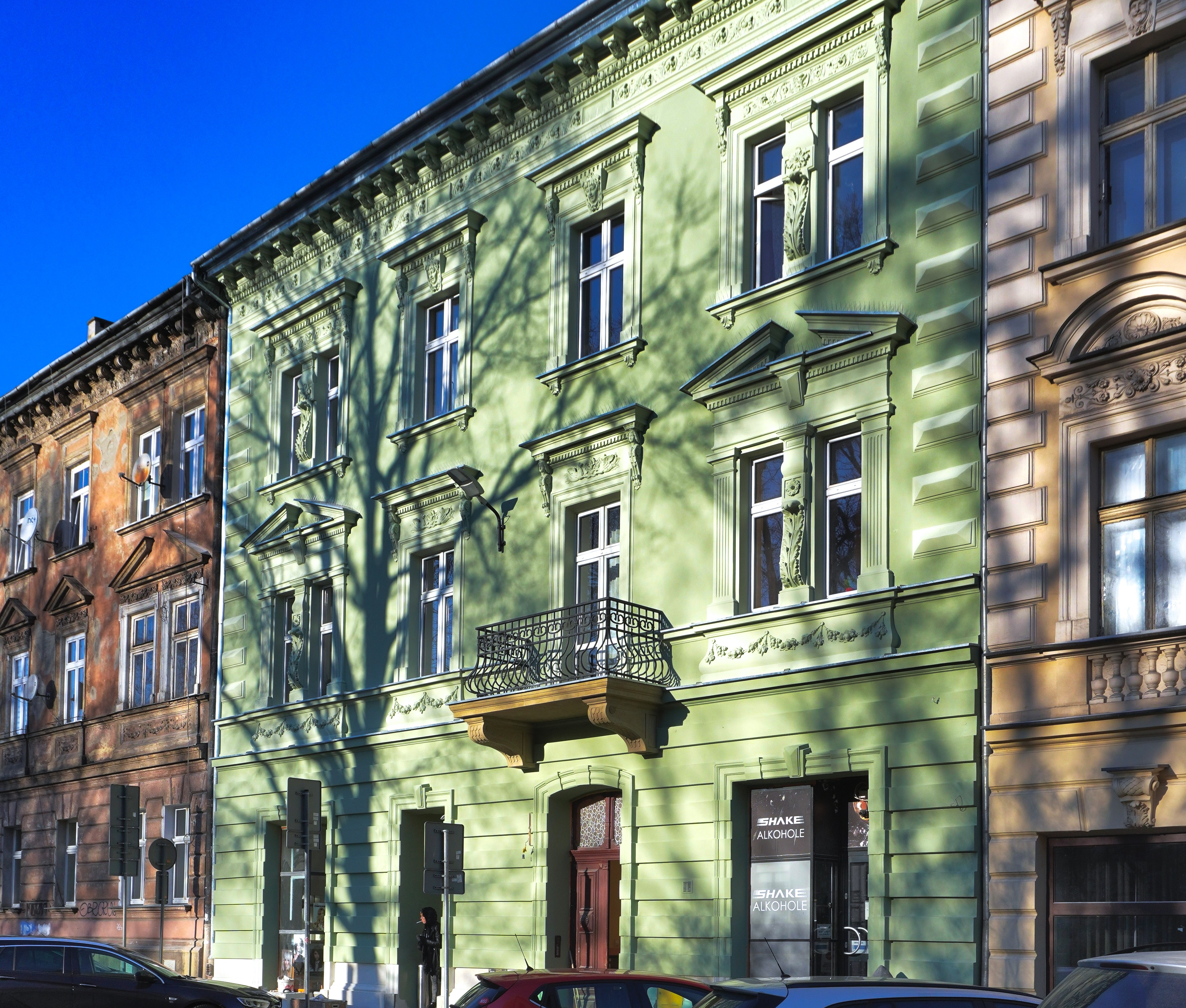
12 Topolowa Street
Tenement house (design. Leopold Tlachna, 1893)

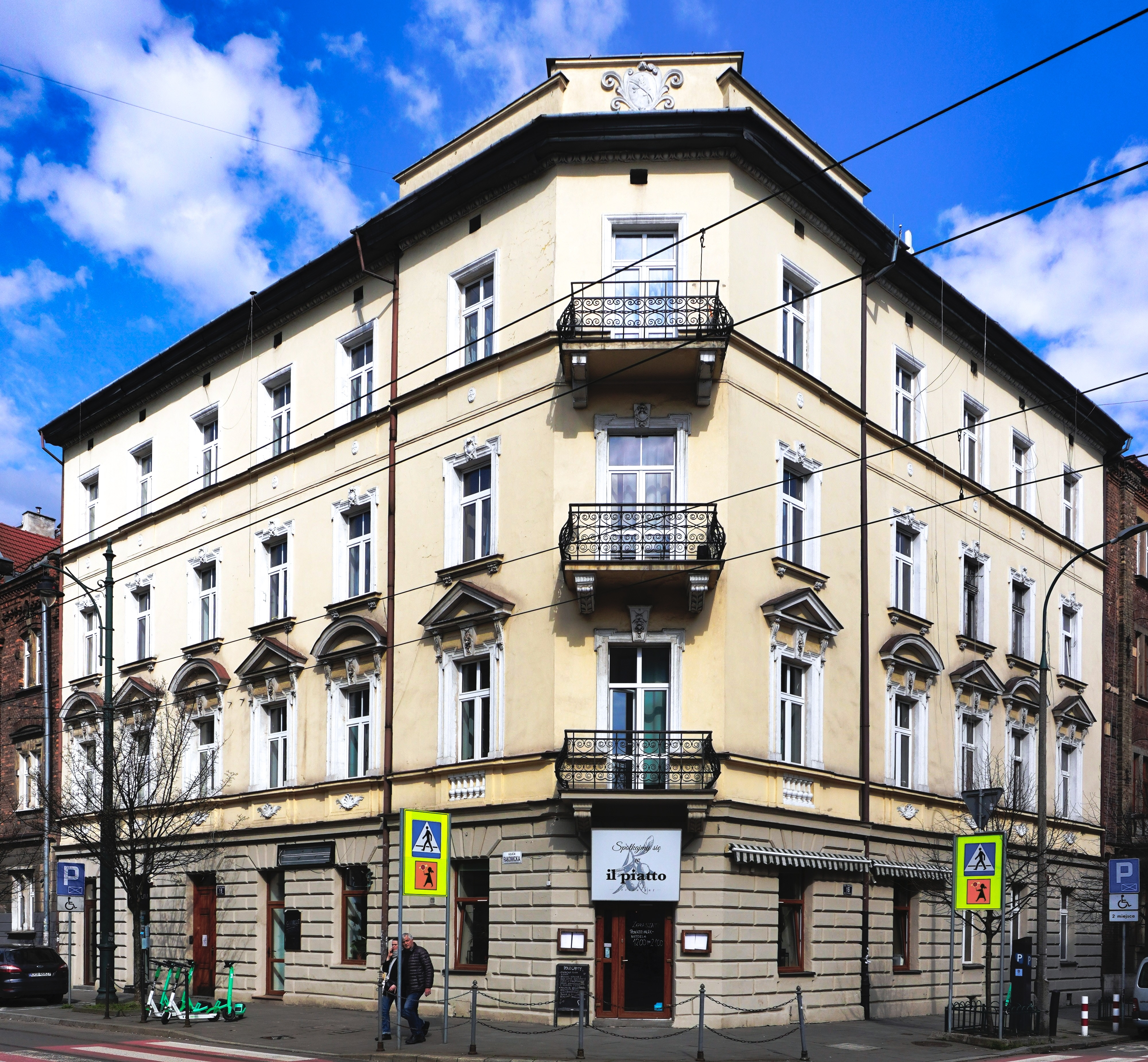
16 Topolowa Street (19 Rakowicka Street)
Tenement house (1894–1895)

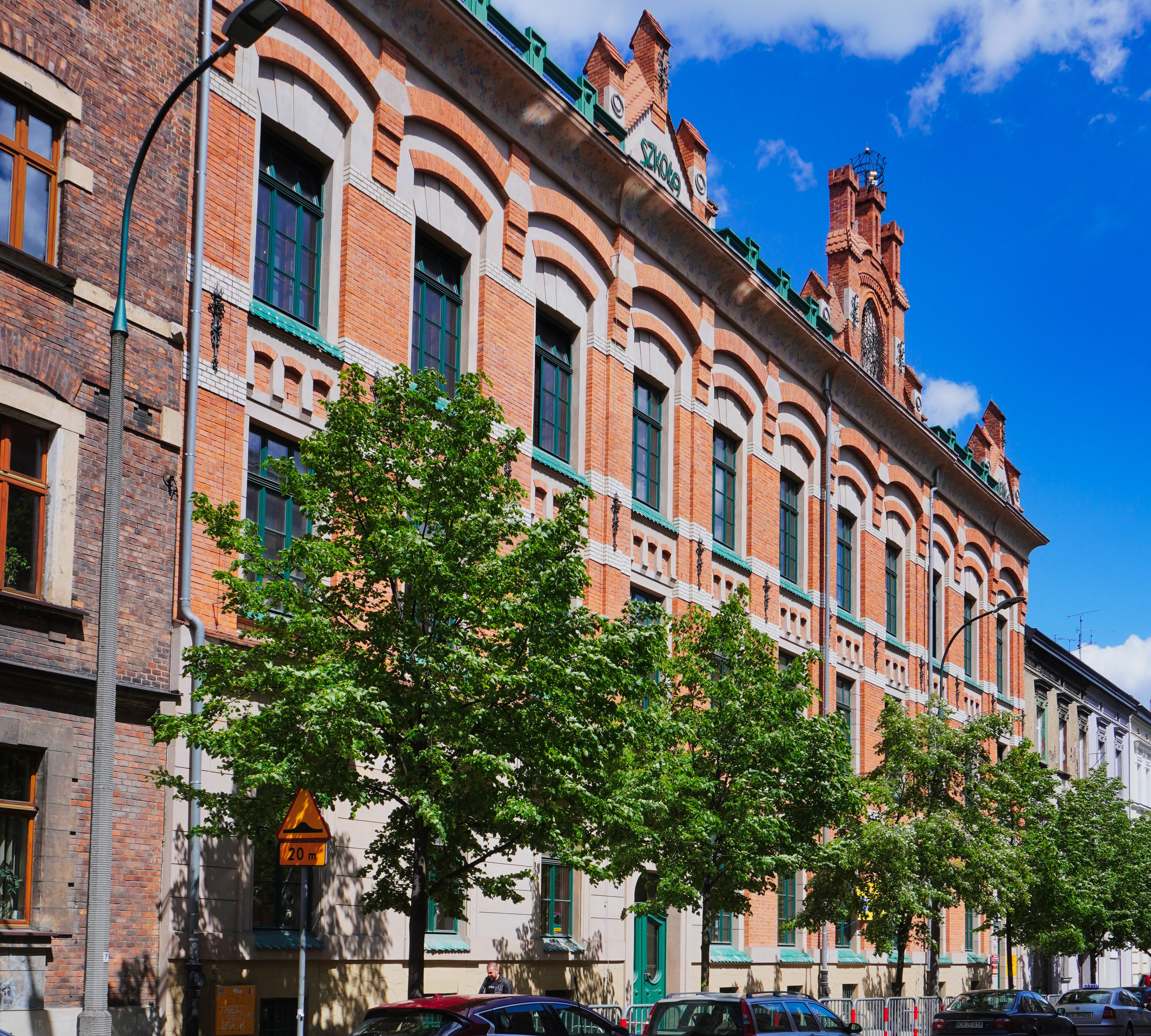
20–22 Topolowa Street
City School, currently Primary School No. 3 (design. Jan Zawiejski, 1903)

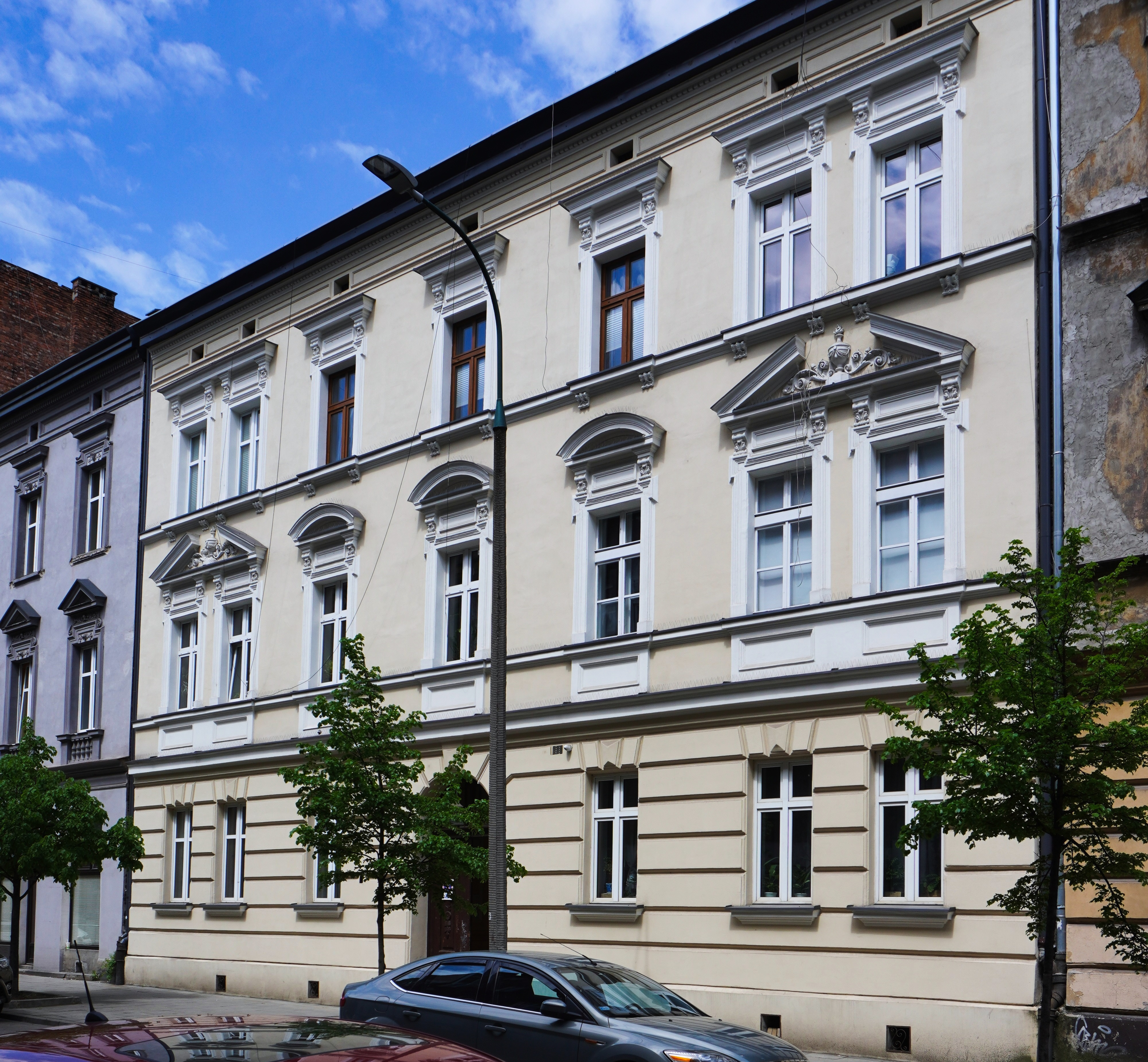
26 Topolowa Street
Tenement house (design. Leopold Tlachna, 1891)

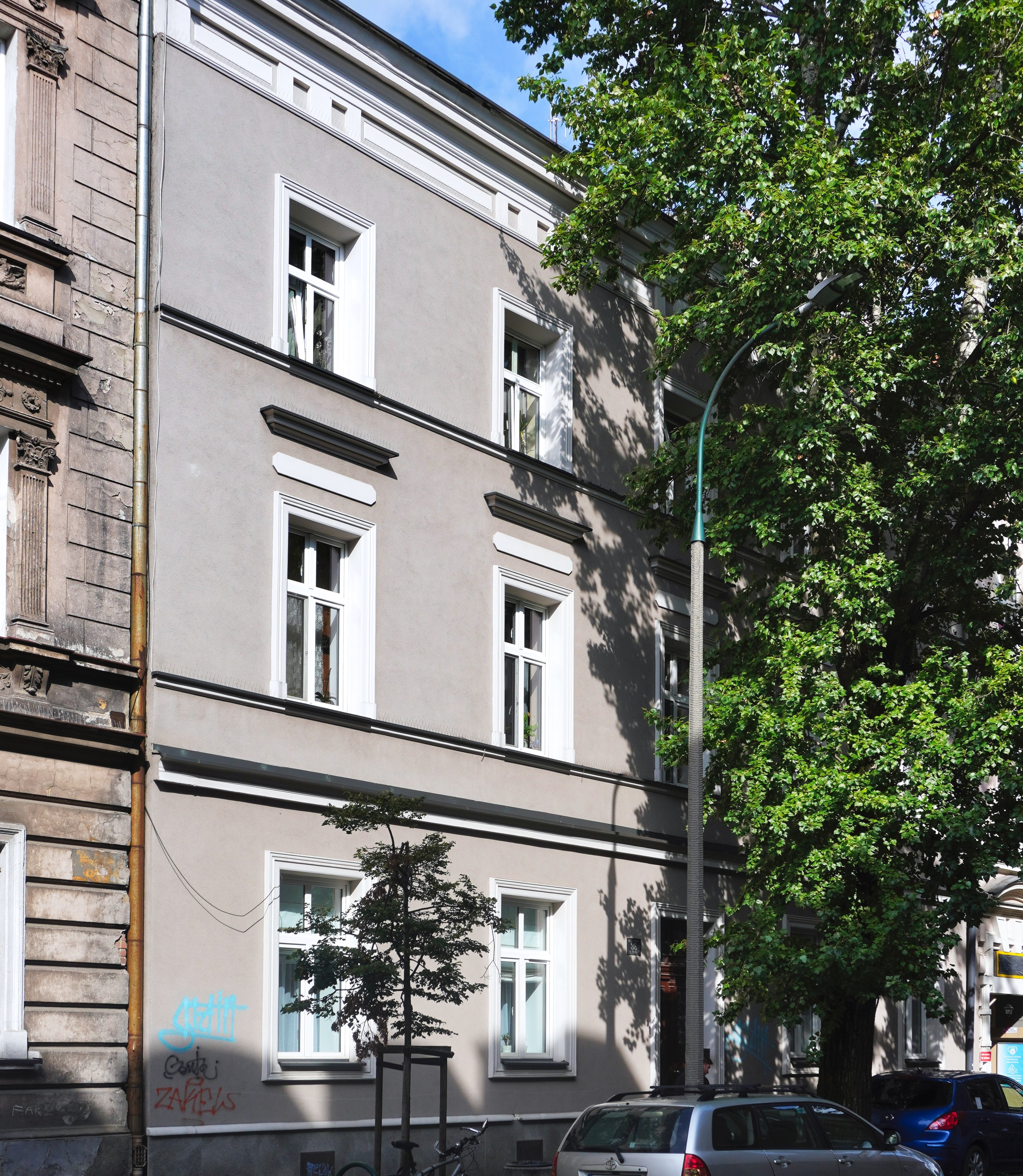
38 Topolowa Street
Tenement house (1887)

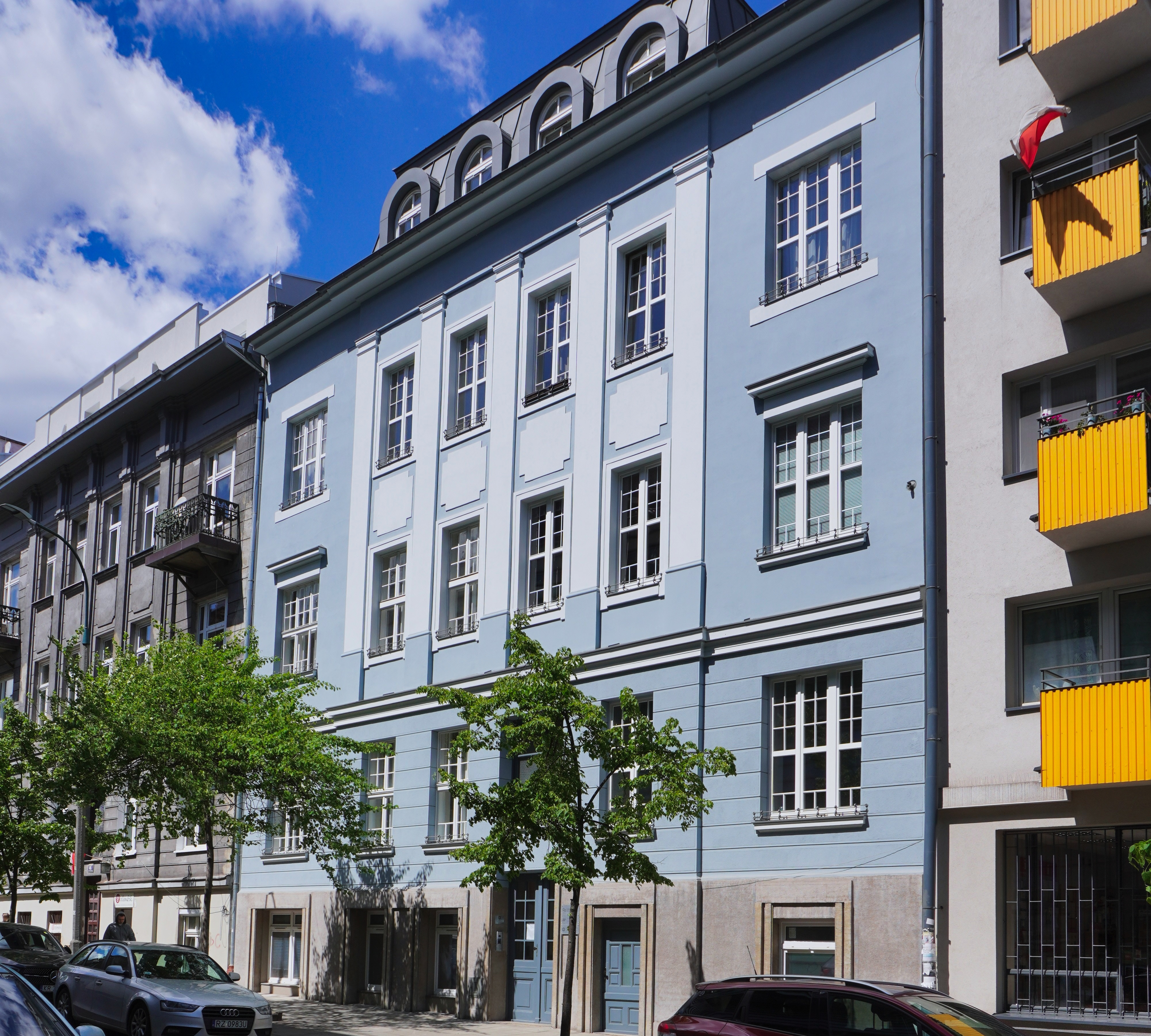
48 Topolowa Street
Tenement house (design. Władysław Kleinberger, 1910)

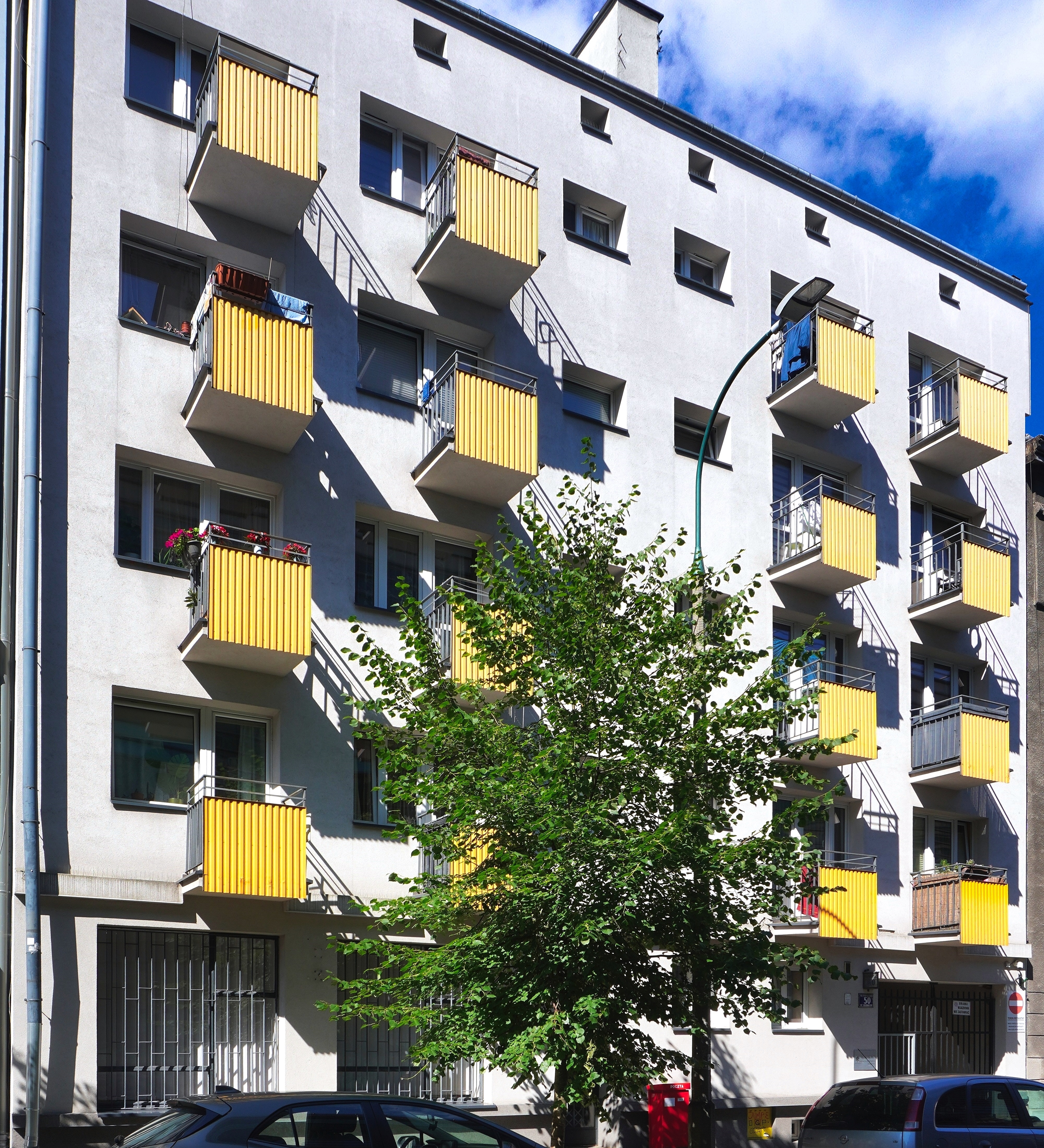
50 Topolowa Street
Tenement house

== Bibliography ==
- Encyklopedia Krakowa (in Polish). Kraków: Wydawnictwo Naukowe PWN. 2000. ISBN 8301133252.
- Ulicami Krakowa (in Polish). Kraków: Wydawnictwo Artystyczno-Graficzne. 1968. p. 34.
