= Lenin Museum =

Lenin Museum may refer to:

- Lenin Museum in Moscow in the Former City Duma building (Moscow)
- Musée Lenine, museum closed 2007 in Paris
- Tampere Lenin Museum, museum in Tampere, Finland, closed on 3 November 2024
- Muzeum Lenina w Krakowie, museum closed in 1990
- Lenin Museum in Poronin, closed in 1990
- Lenin Museum in Warsaw, closed in 1990
- Lenin Museum in Kiev (1982-1993), converted to the Ukrainian House convention center
- Lenin Museum in Riga, (1961-1991, 2006-2023; Media related to Lenin's museum-apartment in Riga at Wikimedia Commons)
