= Mańkowski Palace =

Historic palace in Kraków, Poland

Mańkowskich Palace
- Pałac Mańkowskich
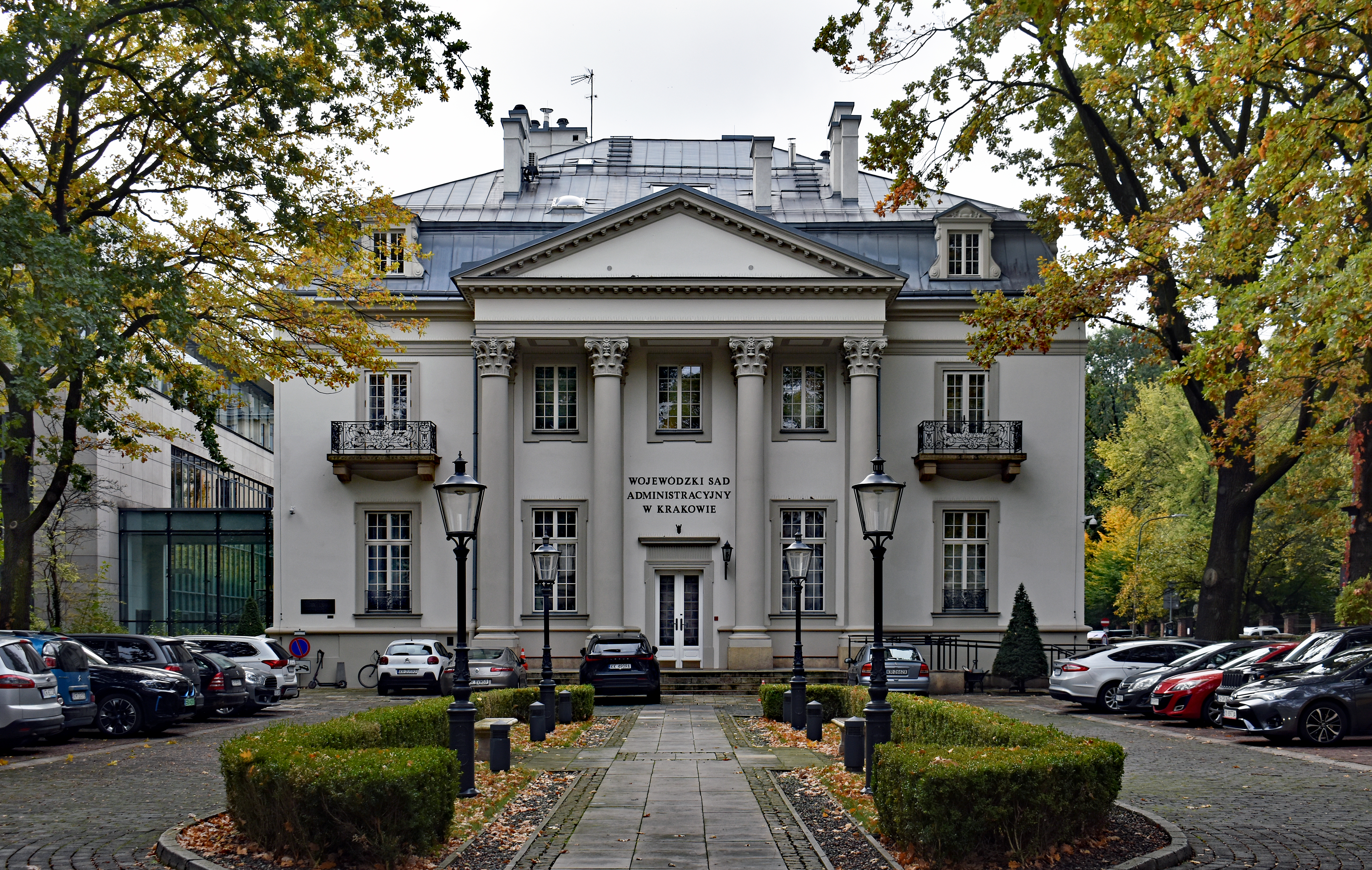

General information
- Address: 5 Topolowa Street, 11 Zygmunt August Street
- Town or city: Kraków
- Country: Poland
- Coordinates: 50°03′59.4″N 19°57′03.8″E
- Completed: 1903

Mańkowskich Palace (Polish: Pałac Mańkowskich) is a Neoclassical palace located in Kraków, in district Grzegórzki, at 5 Topolowa Street, in the Wesoła neighborhood.

== History ==
Built between 1901 and 1903 according to a design by Józef Sowiński and Władysław Kaczmarski for Leon Mańkowski – an Indologist and Sanskrit lecturer. Art historian Emanuel Świeykowski collaborated with the architects during construction. The palace features a facade with a columned portico and a mansard roof, surrounded by a garden. The original interior decorations (stuccowork and polychromes) were inspired by classicism. The southern pediment bears the Prawdzic coat of arms of the Mańkowski family.

After World War II, the palace initially served as the seat of the Kraków voivodes, and from 1950 to 1990, it housed the Lenin Museum.

As part of the adaptation for exhibition purposes, the stuccowork, polychromes, and marble fireplaces were destroyed. Additionally, the palace was reoriented by adding a grand portico to the northern elevation. Dormer windows were added to the roof, and the garden was altered. In the 1970s, the palace underwent a conservation renovation.

By a decision of the Kraków city president on February 28, 1990, the Lenin Museum was dissolved, and the palace was returned to its owner a year later. Today, it serves as the seat of the Provincial Administrative Court.

On January 2, 1968, the palace was entered into the Registry of Cultural Property. It is also entered into the municipal register of monuments of the Lesser Poland Voivodeship.
