= Ohrenstein House =

Coordinates: 50°3′06.5″N 19°56′28″E

- Kamienica Ohrensteina
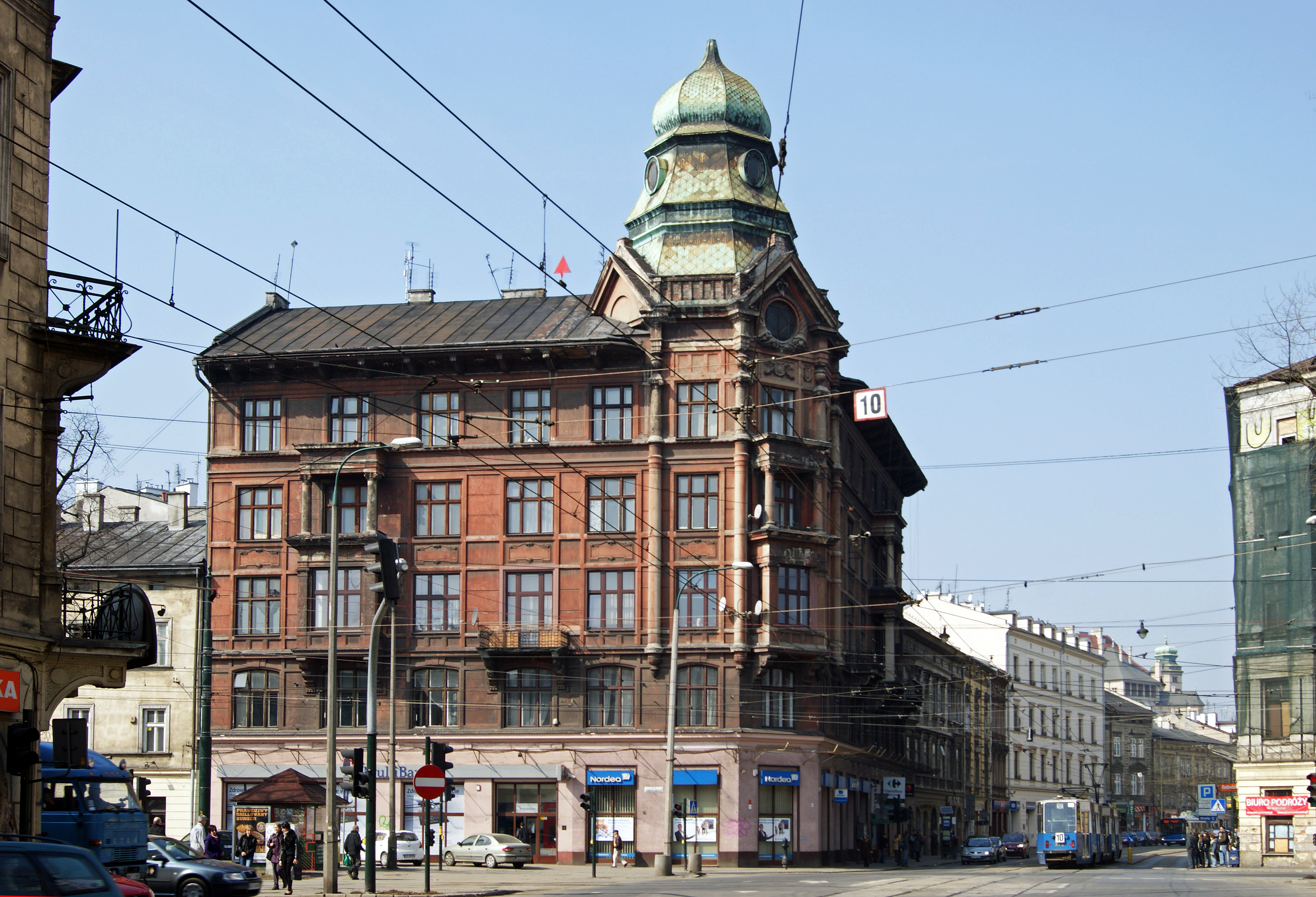
- Ohrenstein's tenement house, Kraków, Poland
- Interactive map of the Ohrenstein House area

General information
- Type: tenement house
- Architectural style: Neohistorism / early Modernist
- Location: ul. Dietla 42 ul. Stradomska 27, Kraków, Poland
- Construction started: 1911
- Completed: 1913
- Owner: Moshe Löbel Ohrenstein

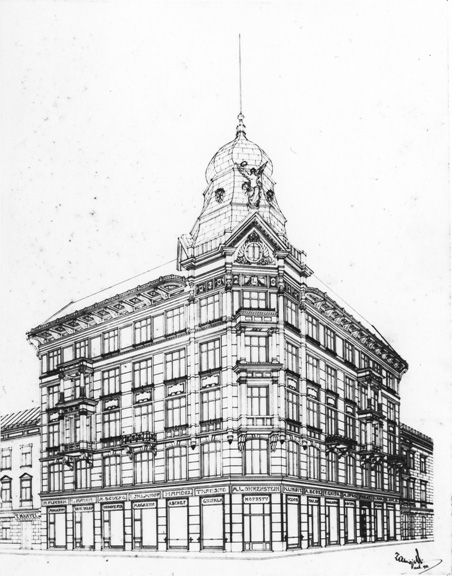
Project of Moses Ohrenstein's house by Zawiejski

Ohrenstein House – is an early 20th century tenement house located in Kraków, Poland. Designed by Jan Zawiejski represents a mixture of Neohistorism and early Modernist trends in architecture, typical for the period around 1910. It was built for a Polish-Jewish wine merchant Moshe Ohrenstein and his wife Roza, née Wald, and was constructed in the years 1911–1913. The sumptuous building was the largest tenement erected in Kraków before the WWI. The characteristic spire on top of the cupola over the building's corner was dismantled during the WWII.

The building is listed as a landmark since 1993, but still awaits major renovation works.
