= Zwierzyniecki Salon Artystyczny =

Coordinates: 50°03′18″N 19°54′32″E

Zwierzyniecki House
- Dom Zwierzyniecki
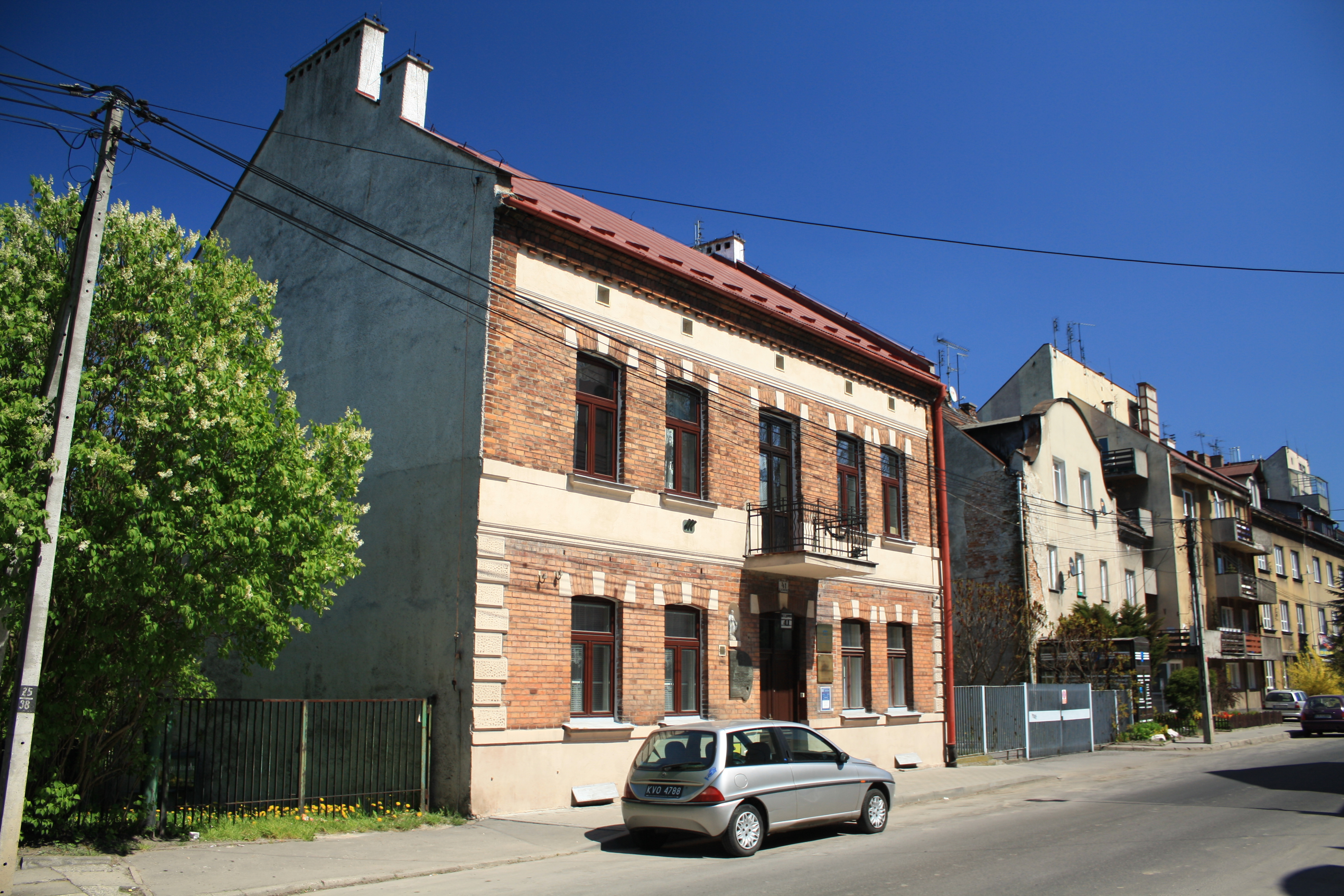
- Former name: Zwierzyniecki Artistic Salon; Zwierzyniecki Salon Artystyczny
- Established: 1996; 30 years ago
- Location: Królowej Jadwigi 41, 30-209 Kraków, Poland
- Type: Local history, historic house museum

Zwierzyniecki House (formerly Zwierzyniecki Artistic Salon) is a branch of the Museum of Krakow located at 41 Queen Hedwig Street in Zwierzyńec, Krakow, at the foot of The Mountain of St. Bronisławy, near the monastery of Ss. Norbertanek, the Church of the Holy Salwator and the Kosciuszko mound. Zwierzyniecki House focuses on local microhistory, researching and documenting the changes that have taken place in the former suburbs of Krakow since their integration into the city. It also organizes short exhibitions devoted to the history of Krakow's suburbs, Krakow customs and outstanding representatives of the local community. A regular resident and caretaker of the Zwierzyniecki House is a black cat Włodek.

This branch of the Museum of Krakow is housed in a typical sub-urban tenement building from the turn of the 19th and 20th centuries. It was built by the mason Jan Florczyk. Between July and August 1912, the upstairs apartment accommodated the family of Russian revolutionary Vladimir Ulianov, better known as Lenin. To commemorate this fact, the first Lenin apartment in Krakow exhibit opened in 1970. For ten years, starting in 1980, the building was owned and operated by the Lenin Museum in Kraków, as a subsidiary. Its presentations included temporary exhibitions on the workers' movement and the proletarian revolution, presented alongside the permanent collection (Lenin's apartment).

In 1990, after the decommissioning of the Lenin Museum, the building was transferred to the Museum of Krakow. Initially, the structure served as a museum warehouse. From 1991 to 1996, some of the halls were used by the Ewa Demarczyk Theatre. In 1996, as a result of an agreement between the museum, the District Council of the VII Zwierzyniec, and the Zwierzyniecki Circle of Friends of All Arts (founded by the Krakow painter Halina Cieślińska-Brzeska), the Zwierzyniecki Artistic Salon, a branch of the Krakow Museum, was established in the location. In cooperation with the Circle of Friends, the branch organized temporary exhibitions, presenting the paintings, graphics and sculptures of local artists. The art exhibitions continued till 2009, when the branch updated its creative direction, dropping art exhibitions in favour of presentations showcasing the history of Zwierzyńc. The branch changed its name from Zwierzyniecki Artistic Salon to Zwierzyniecki House in 2014.

The permanent exhibition now features the interior of a Krakow suburb apartment at the beginning of the 20th century. Temporary exhibitions tell the history of Krakow's suburbs, ancient traditions and specific urban folklore. The branch also hosts meetings, lectures, and educational activities for children focusing on the microhistory of Krakow. Seasonal cultural events top the list of activities that harken to pre-city traditions. Key among these events is the Emaus Easter Fiesta, which features a contest for the most beautiful emaus tree. Others include the Corpus Christi meeting with the accompanying Lajkonik parade (also known as Konik Zwierzyniecki) and joint carolling at Yuletide showcasing Christmas trees decorated with toys made by children.

Zwierzyniecki House also serves as an information centre for Zwierzyńec, where you can buy guides, souvenirs and literature on the history of Krakow's suburbs published by the Museum of Krakow.
