= Juliusz Słowacki Theatre =

- Teatr im. Juliusza Słowackiego
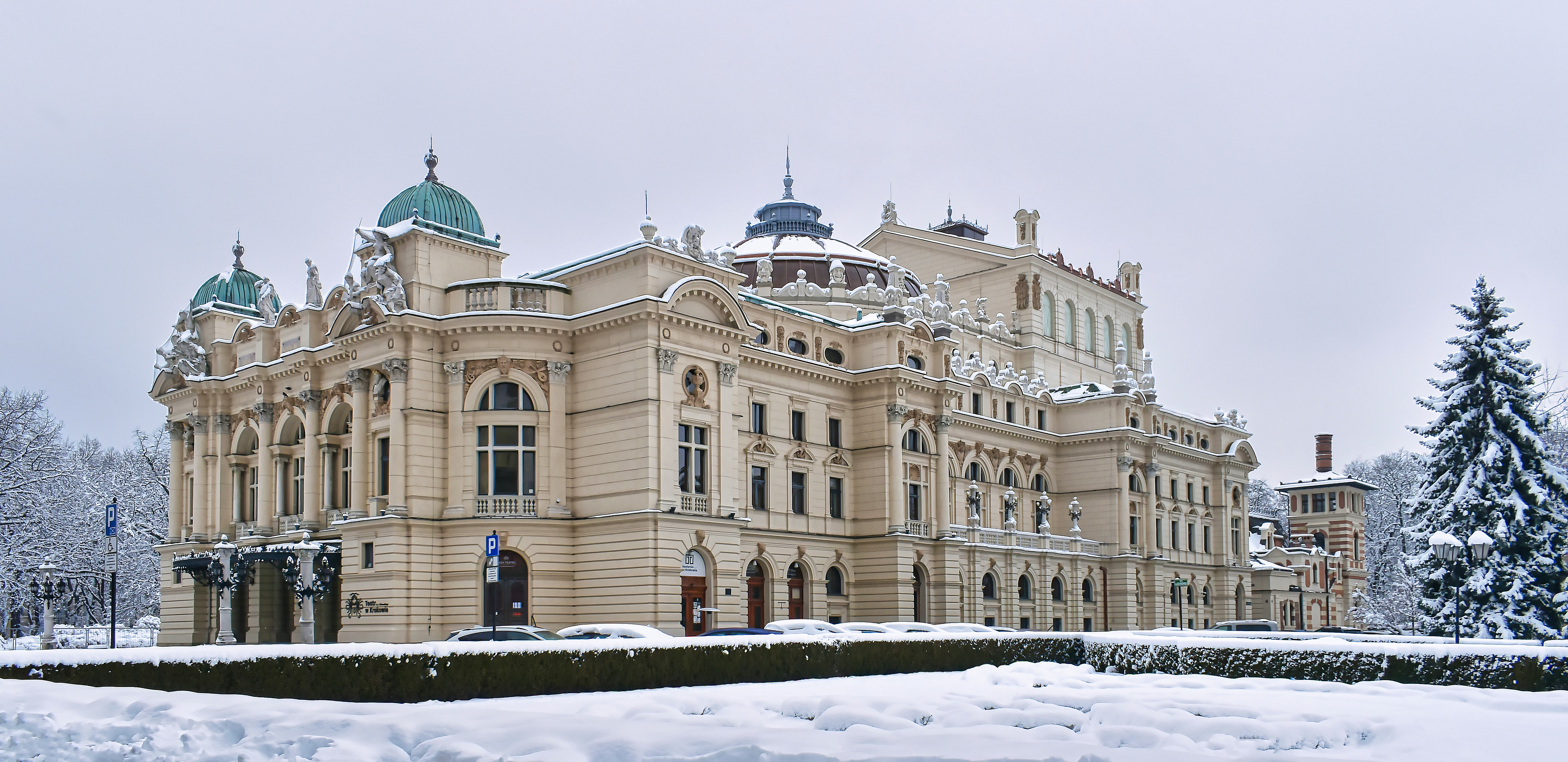
- Interactive map of the Juliusz Słowacki Theatre area

General information
- Type: Theatre and opera house
- Location: 1 Świętego Ducha Square; Kraków, Poland
- Coordinates: 50°3′50″N 19°56′35″E
- Opened: October 21, 1893; 132 years ago

Design and construction
- Architect: Jan Zawiejski

Other information
- Seating capacity: 540 seated (excluding foyer)

Website
- slowacki.krakow.pl

UNESCO World Heritage Site
- Type: Cultural
- Criteria: iv
- Designated: 1978
- Part of: Historic Centre of Kraków
- Reference no.: 29
- Region: Europe and North America

Historic Monument of Poland
- Designated: 1994-09-08
- Part of: Kraków historical city complex
- Reference no.: M.P. 1994 nr 50 poz. 418

Juliusz Słowacki Theatre (Polish: Teatr im. Juliusza Słowackiego w Krakowie) is a historic, 19th-century Eclectic-style theatre and opera house located at 1 Świętego Ducha Square in the Old Town of Kraków, Poland, and a UNESCO World Heritage Site. Erected in 1893, it was modeled after some of the best European Baroque and Eclectic theatres such as the Palais Garnier in Paris. The theatre was named after Polish poet Juliusz Słowacki in 1909 and in 1978 was inscribed alongside the Historic Centre of Kraków into the World Heritage Register.

== History ==
Designed by Jan Zawiejski, the theatre was erected on Holy Spirit Square (Plac Św. Ducha) in place of the former 14th century church and monastery of religious order 'Duchacy' or Order of the Holy Ghost (hence the name of the square). The church had been converted into a residential building due to secularization of the Polish male branch of the cloister in 1783. The city council of Kraków decided to demolish it in 1886 in order to make room for a new theatre. The church was dismantled in May 1892 – an event which caused much controversy, notably the emotive declaration of Polish painter Jan Matejko, that he would never exhibit his paintings in Kraków again.

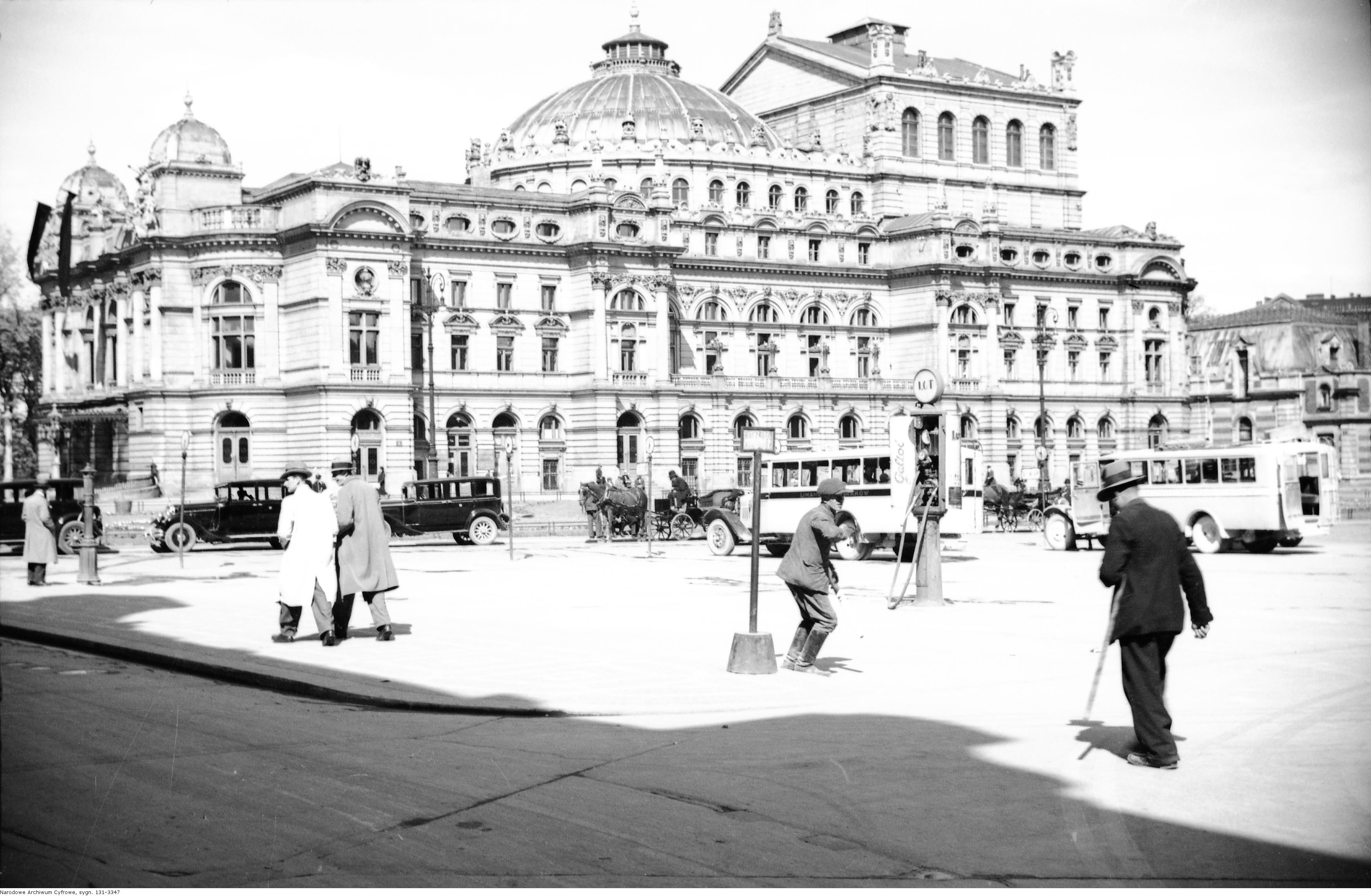
Photograph of Słowacki Theatre from 1935

The new theatre opened on 21 October 1893. It was an exquisite example of the Polish Eclectic architecture, the first building in Kraków designed for and equipped with electric light. Initially it was called Municipal Theatre (Teatr Miejski). Only in 1909 did it receive the name of Juliusz Słowacki, a Polish poet and playwright of Romanticism.

Inauguration took place with a program consisting of excerpts from Aleksander Fredro's Zemsta, Juliusz Słowacki's Balladyna and Adam Mickiewicz's Konfederaci Barscy. The theatre staged its first full-length production, Fredro's Śluby Panieńskie, four days later.

During Nazi Germany occupation of Poland, the theatre was run by a German troupe. The last Polish play for the next 6 years was produced in Autumn 1939. The theatre reopened for Polish audience in February 1945.

Since 27 March 1976, the theatre is accompanied by the Small Stage housed in the former electric plant (designed in 1890s, to provide the theatre with its own electricity). In 2000 a third stage was added, the summertime Next to the Pump Stage. A fourth one (Stage in the Gate) opened on 7 November 2003.

=== Directors ===
The first director of the Theatre was Tadeusz Pawlikowski (1893–1899), followed by Józef Kotarbiński (1899–1905) and Ludwik Solski (1905–1913). Tadeusz Pawlikowski resumed this position in the years 1913-1915. Playwright Lucjan Rydel became the Theatre's director for one season during 1915-1916. Adam Grzymala-Siedlecki took that role in the years 1916-1918.

After World War I, the theatre was directed by Teofil Trzciński (1918–1926), Zygmunt Nowakowski (1926–1929), once again Trzciński (1929–1932), Juliusz Osterwa (1932–1935) and Karol Frycz (1935–1939). Frycz and Osterwa became the directors again after World War II (Frycz from 1945 to 1946, and Osterwa in 1946-1947). The next directors were Bronisław Dąbrowski (1947–1950) and Henryk Szletyński (1950–1955). Bronisław Dąbrowski was once again appointed as director from 1955 to 1972. Krystyna Skuszanka and Jerzy Krasowski directed the theatre from 1972 to 1981. Andrzej Kijowski's short period of directorship ended the same year with the imposition of martial law in Poland. Mikołaj Grabowski (1982–1985) was followed by Jan Paweł Gawlik (1985–1989), Jan Prochyra (1989–1990), Jerzy Goliński (1990–1992) and Bogdan Hussakowski (1992–1999). Current director of the theatre is Krzysztof Orzechowski.

== Cultural significance ==
The Theatre became the birthplace of the theatrical concept of the Young Poland movement and was closely related to the rediscovery of Romantic drama as well as the premiere productions of plays by Polish national playwright Stanisław Wyspiański.

The significance of the Polish Romantic tradition under the foreign occupation and especially Słowacki's legacy was reflected in the first festival of his plays organized there in 1909. It was at this time that the Theatre adopted the name of Słowacki and became known as Juliusz Słowacki Theatre.

The proposal of a theatre based on a synthesis of the visual arts, acting, music, light and drama is as natural as theatre itself. At the time, however, it was an avant-garde solution that challenged reigning canons.

— Diana Poskuta-Włodek, Culture.pl.

At the Theatre, the audiences could witness actors such as Kazimierz Kamiński, Ludwik Solski, Maksymilian Węgrzyn, Antonina Hoffman, Wanda Siemaszkowa, Stanisława Wysocka and Aleksander Zelwerowicz. Theatre artists like Juliusz Osterwa and Kazmierz Junosza-Stepowski began their careers at the Słowacki Theatre, and Helena Modrzejewska made numerous guest appearances. During the interwar period, the theatre was overshadowed by the Warsaw theatre scene, but still it was considered to be one of the most important stages in Poland. In 1980 the Słowacki Theatre staged the world premiere of Pope John Paul II Our God's Brother (Brat naszego boga), a production whose significance was above all political.

== Gallery ==
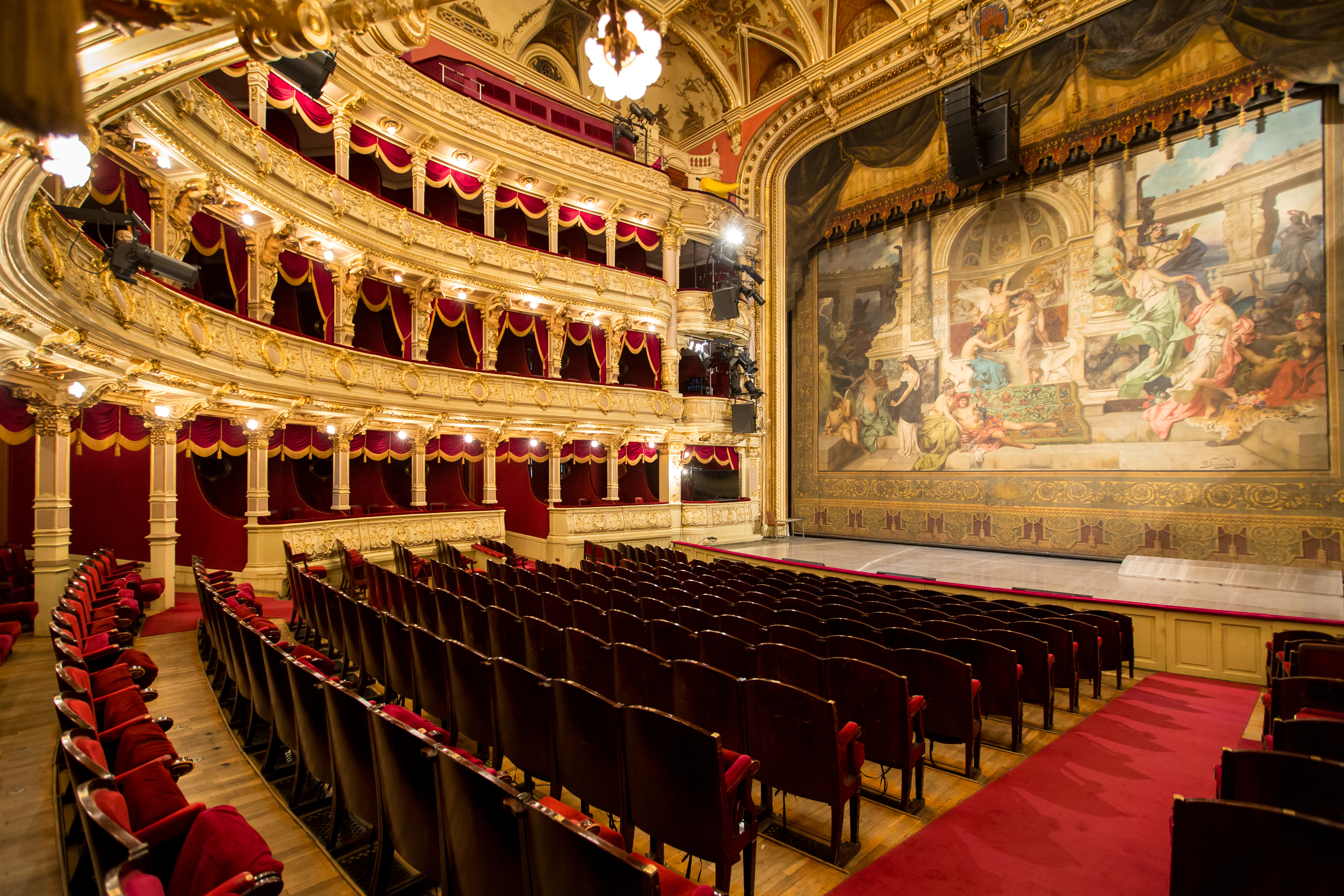
Theatre interior

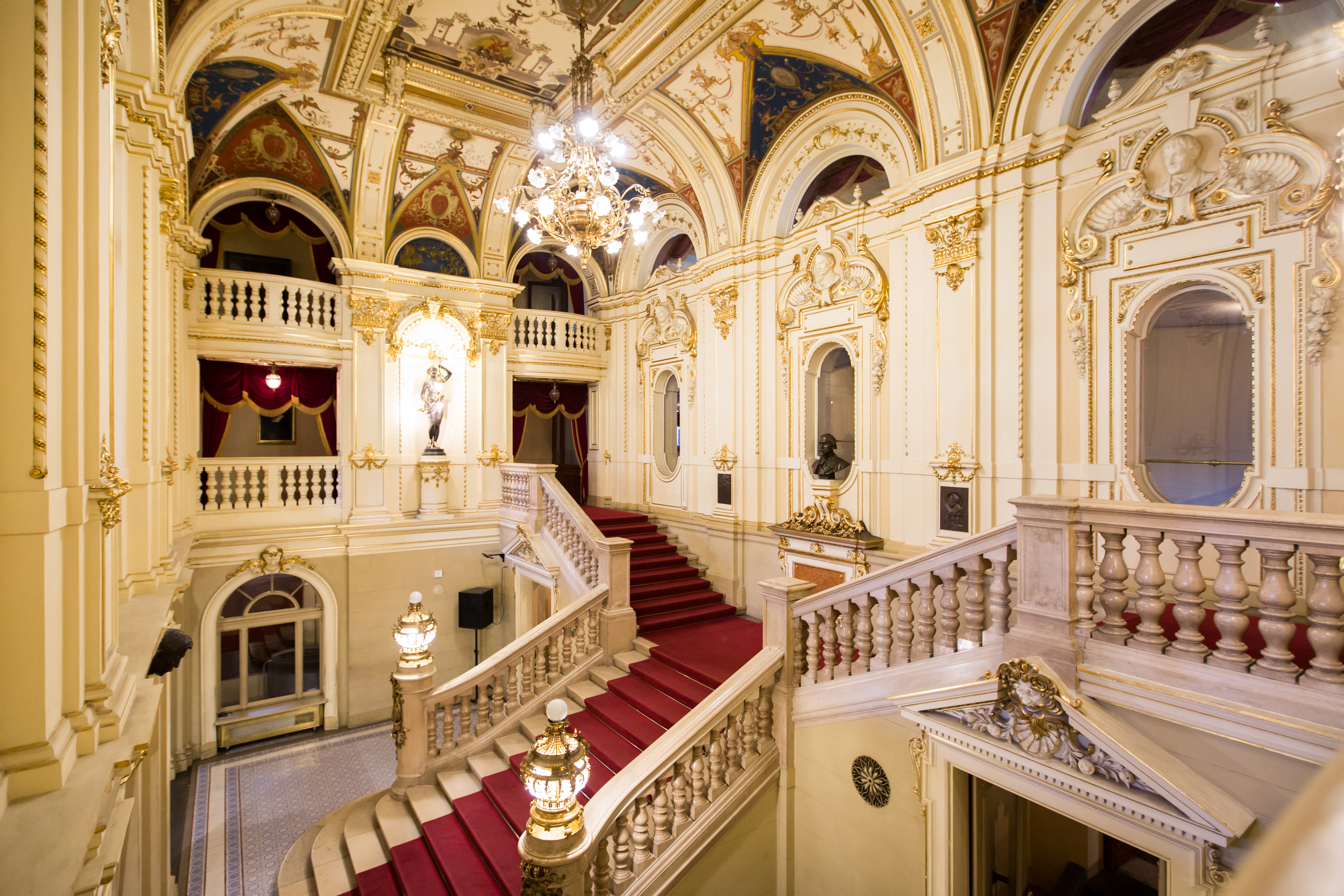
Entrance hall

Curtain, by Henryk Siemiradzki

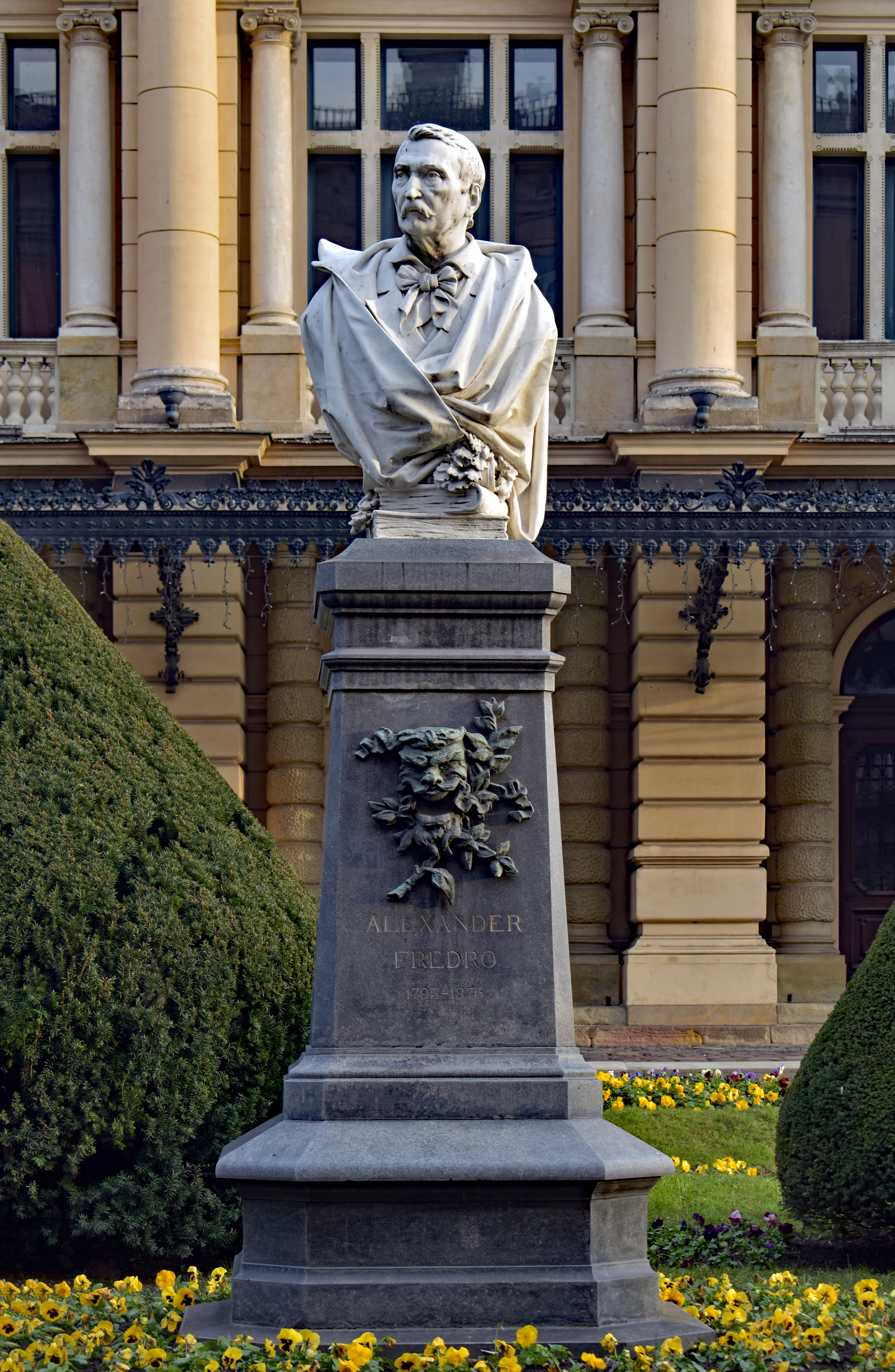
Bust of Aleksander Fredro

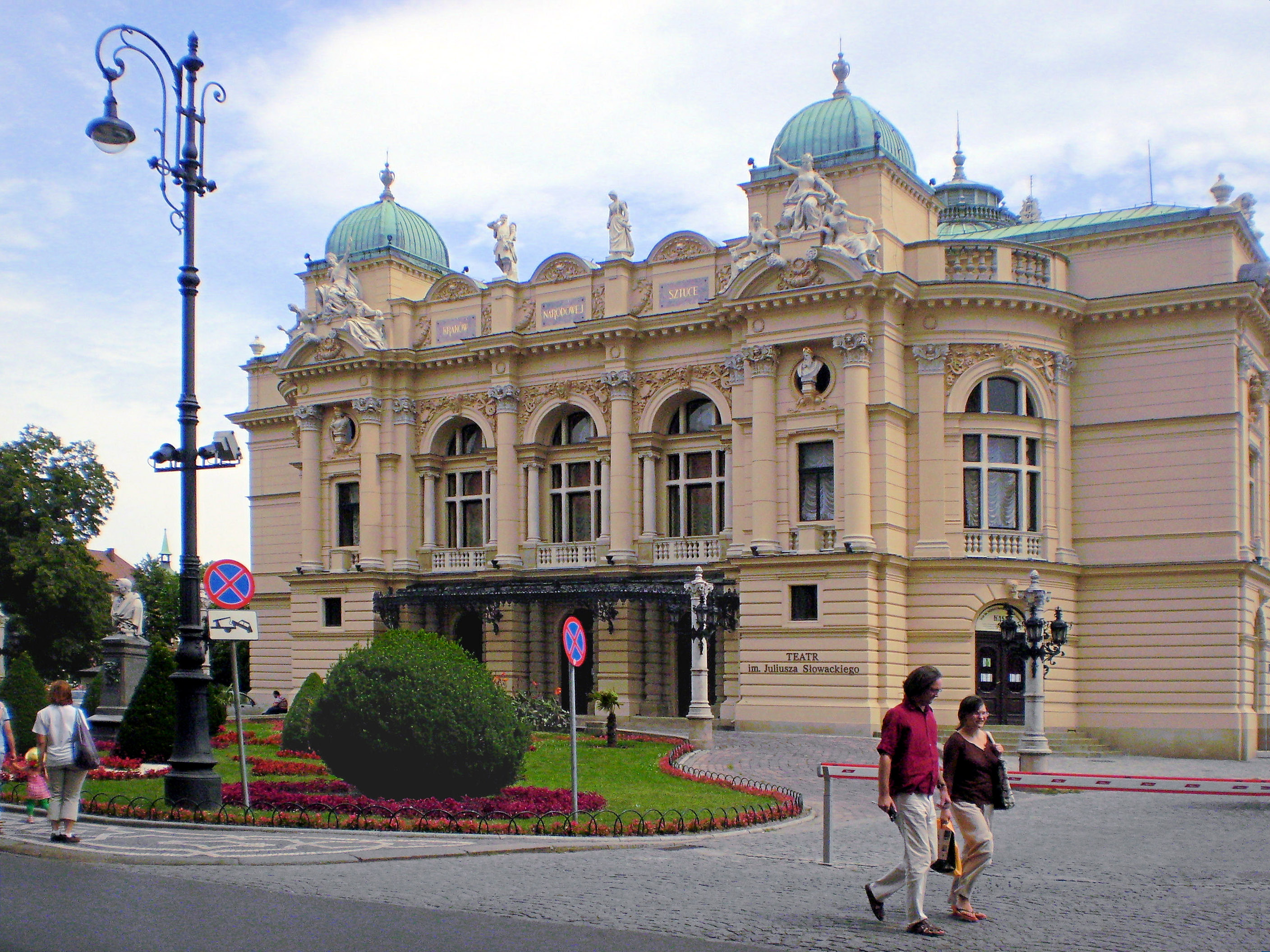
Słowacki Theatre, front entrance

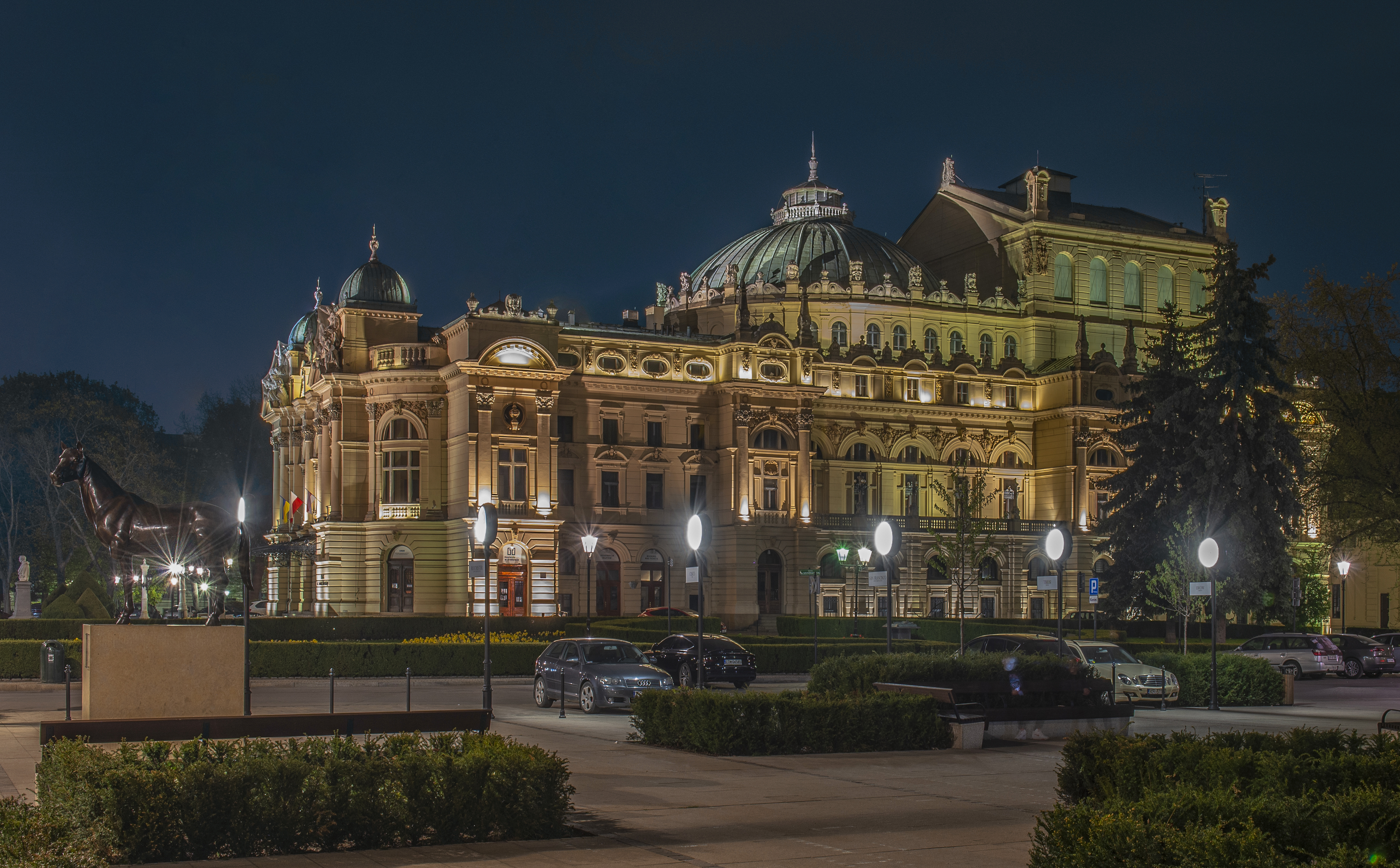
The theatre in Kraków Old Town at night

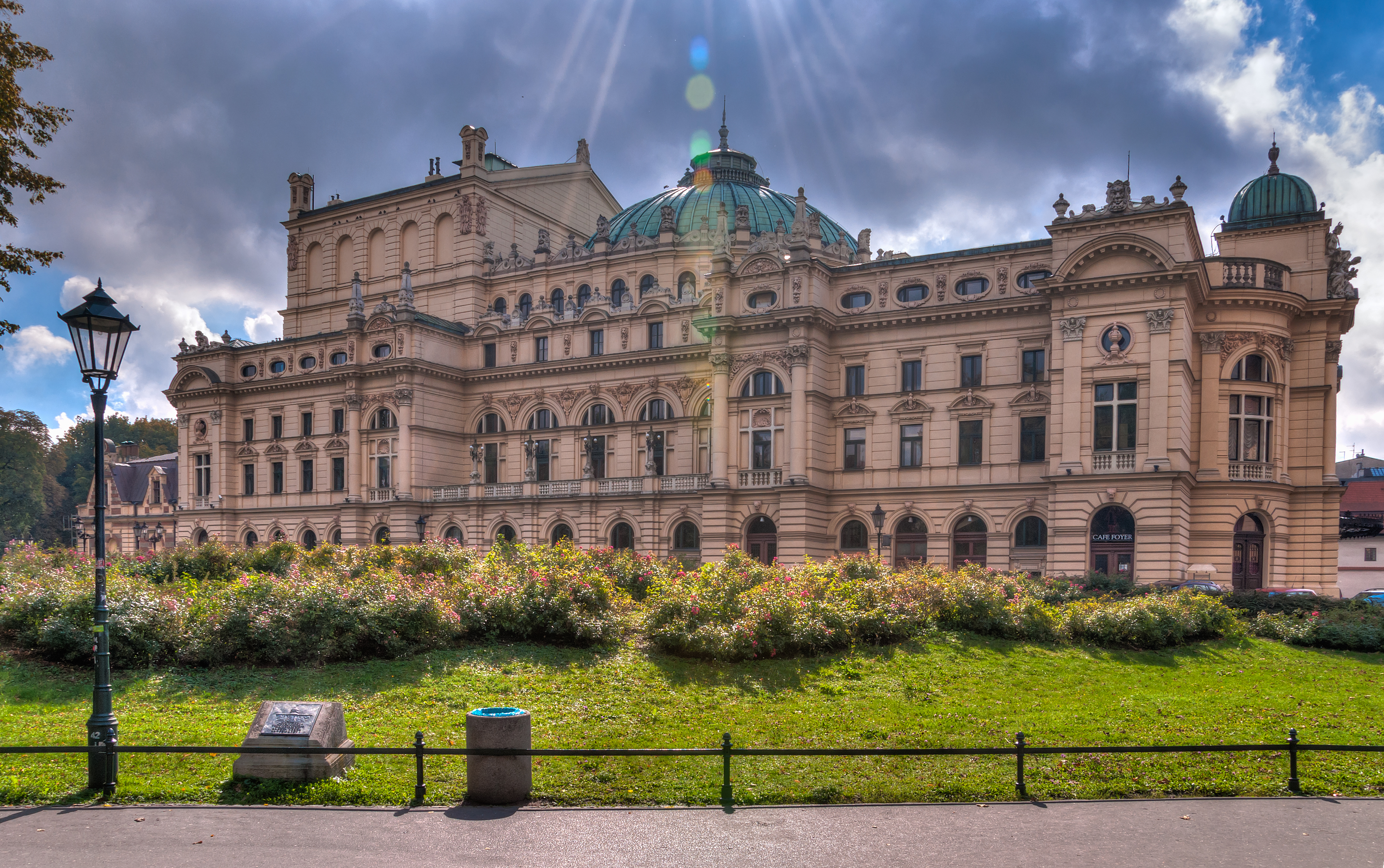
Side view

== See also ==
- Culture of Kraków
- Adam Grzymała-Siedlecki
