= Jan Zawiejski =

Polish architect (1854–1922)

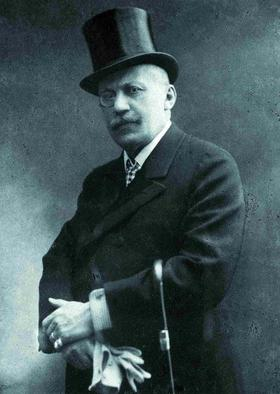
- Born: 20 June 1854; Kraków, Kingdom of Galicia and Lodomeria, Austria-Hungary
- Died: 9 September 1922 (aged 68); Kraków, Poland
- Occupation: architect
- Practice: Technical University of Munich
- Buildings: Juliusz Słowacki Theatre; Krynica-Zdrój Main Drinking House

Jan Zawiejski, born Jan Baptysta Feintuch (20 June 1854 – 9 September 1922), was a Polish architect from an assimilated Polish-Jewish family, a representative of the 19th-century historicism advocating for a return to classical design of the past.

== Life and work ==
Zawiejski was born on 20 June 1854 in Kraków, located at that time in the Austrian partition. He came from a wealthy Jewish Feintuch family. In 1846, the Feintuch family accepted baptism at the Evangelical St. Martin's Church. In the years 1872–1873, he studied at the Technical University of Munich and between 1873 and 1878 at the Polytechnic in Vienna. In 1900, he became the city architect of Kraków and held that position until 1914. He worked as a professor at the Kraków School of Commerce (Krakowska Szkoła Przemysłowa) and collaborated with the Architekt and Nowa Reforma magazines.

His most notable design works in Kraków include Juliusz Słowacki Theatre (1889-1893), School of Economics (1904–1906), Ohrenstein House at the corner of Stradom and Dietla streets built for Moshe Löbel Ohrenstein and his wife Reizel Wald (1911–1913), Turnaus' Townhouse at the corner of Siemiradzki and Łobzowska Streets (1889–1891) and the architect's own house, the so-called Jasny Dom (The Bright House) built 1909–1910. He also designed the old Spa House (Pol. "Stary Dom Zdrojowy") in Krynica (1884–1889; with Jan Niedzielski). Between 190 and 1013, he supervised the reconstruction of the Wielopolski Palace, seat of the Kraków City Council.

Zawiejski died on 9 September 1922 in Kraków. He is interred in the Rakowicki Cemetery.

== Gallery ==
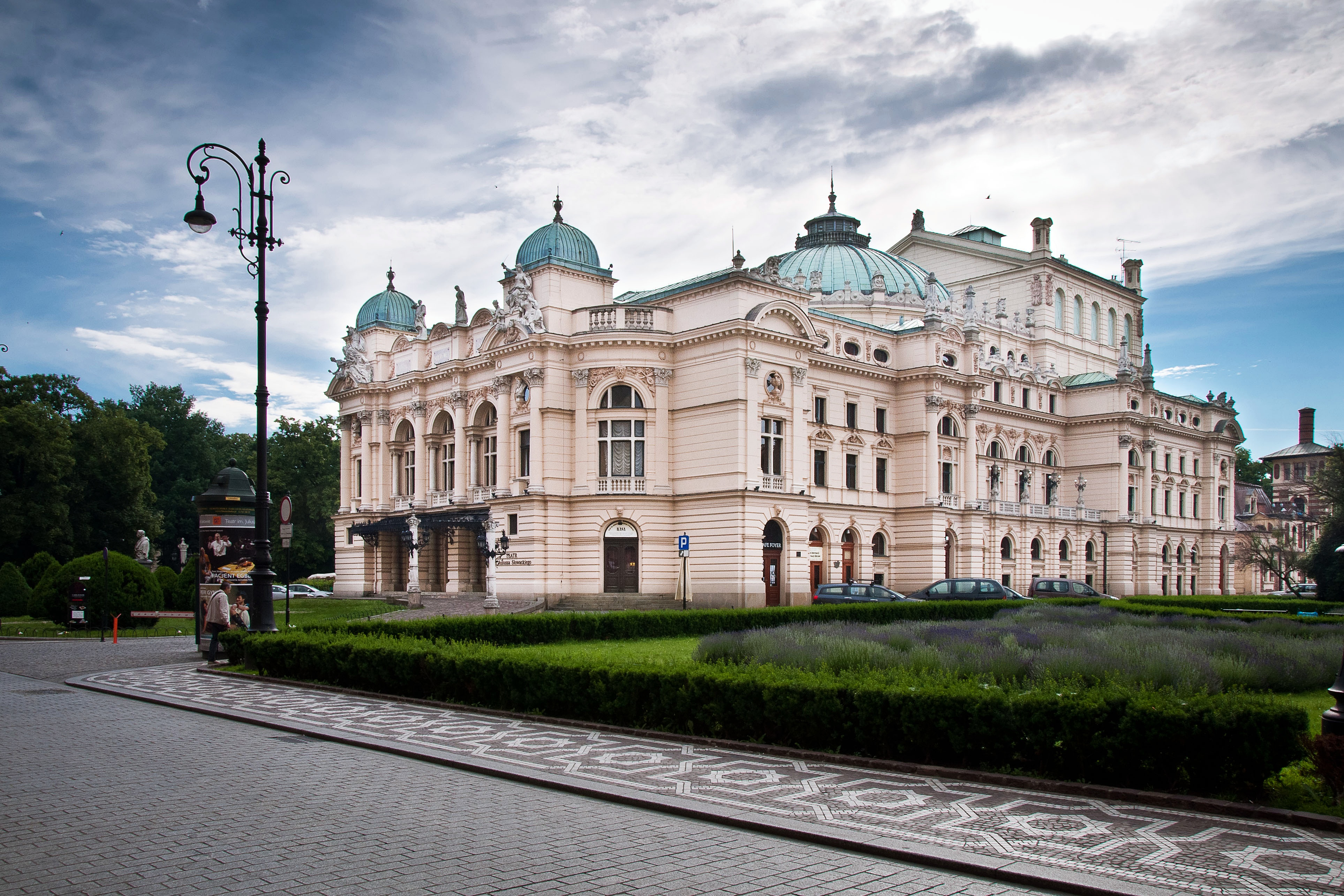
Juliusz Słowacki Theatre, Kraków, by Zawiejski

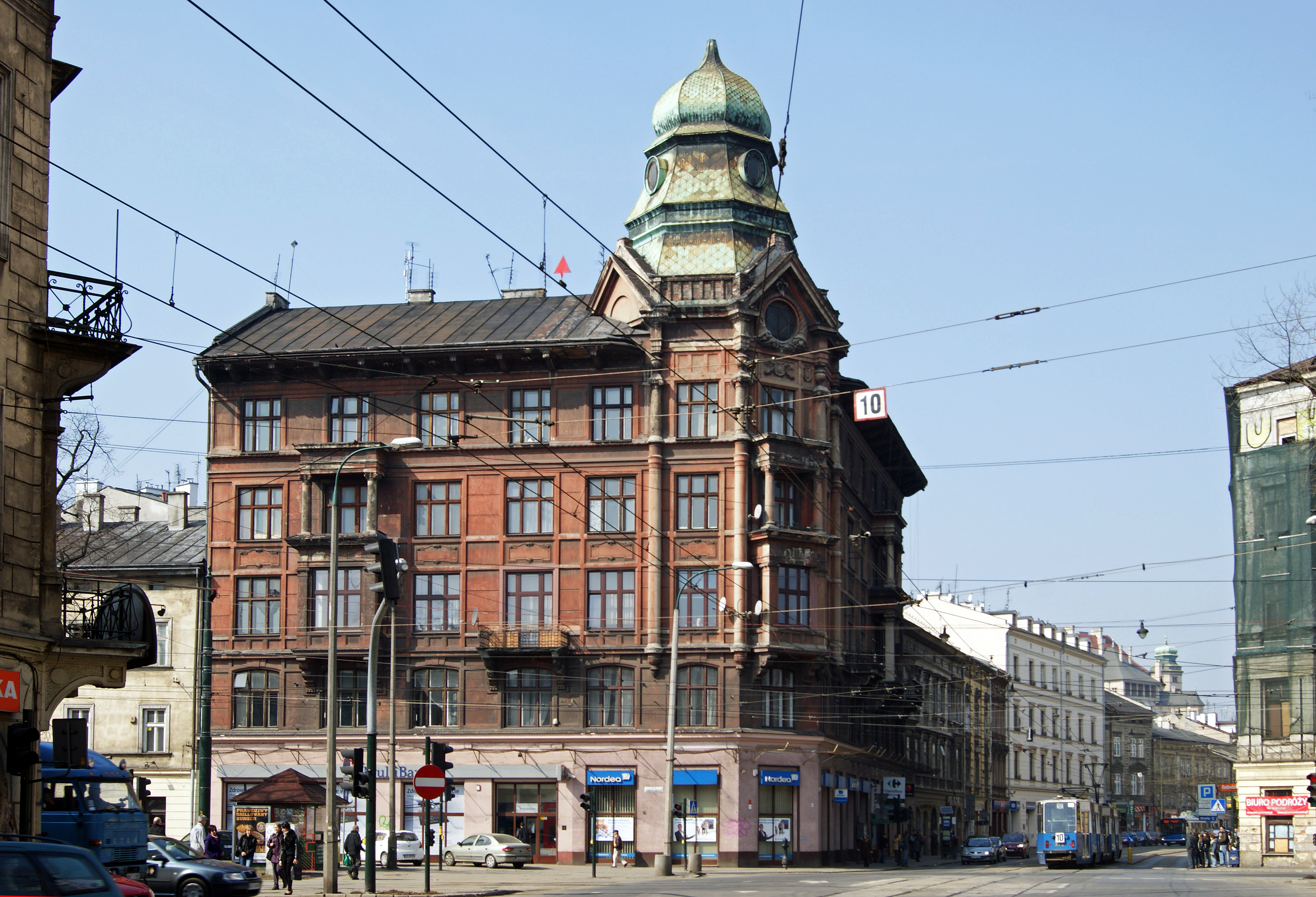
Ohrenstein tenement house, Krakow

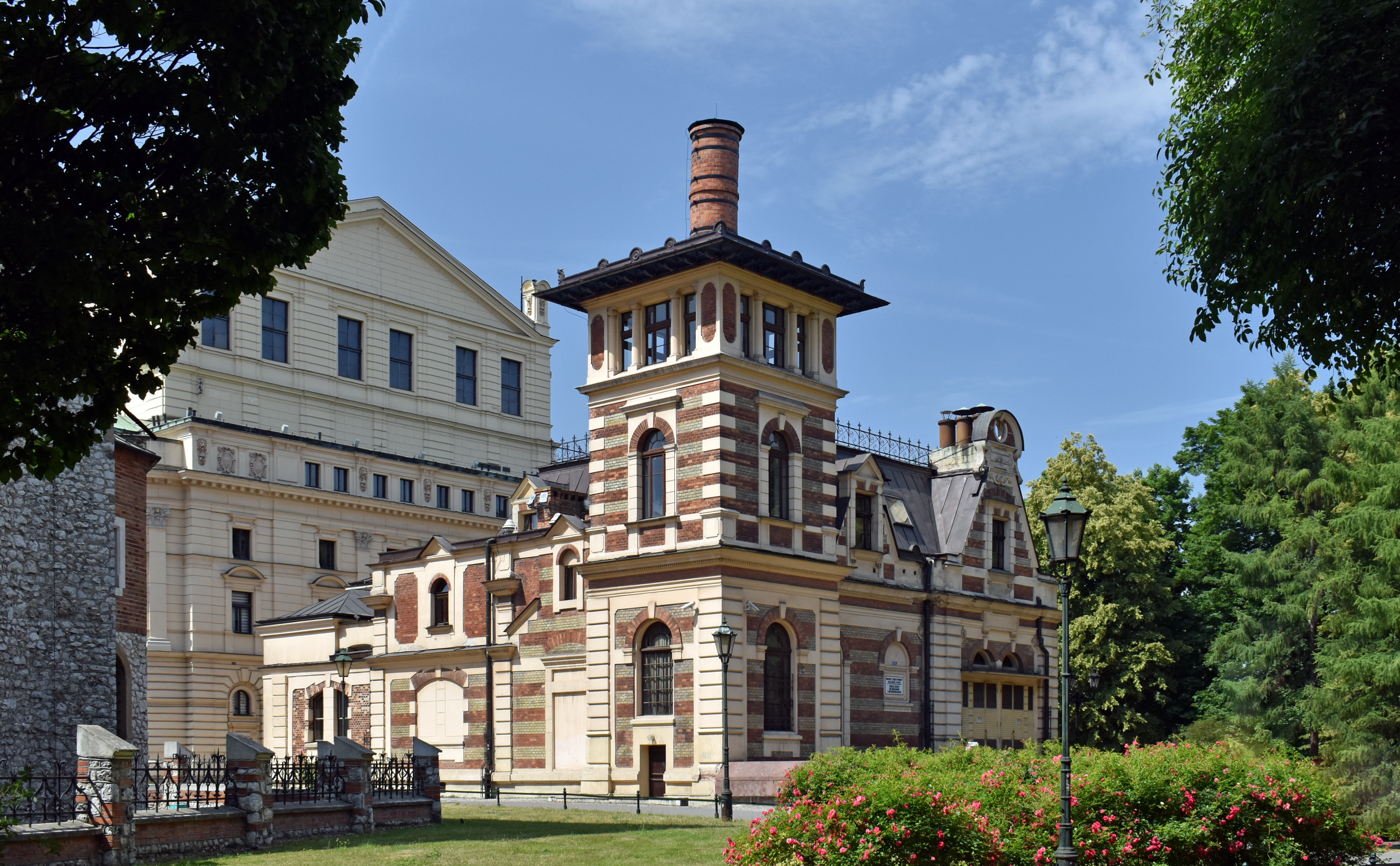
Small Stage Miniatura, part of the Juliusz Słowacki Theatre, Krakow

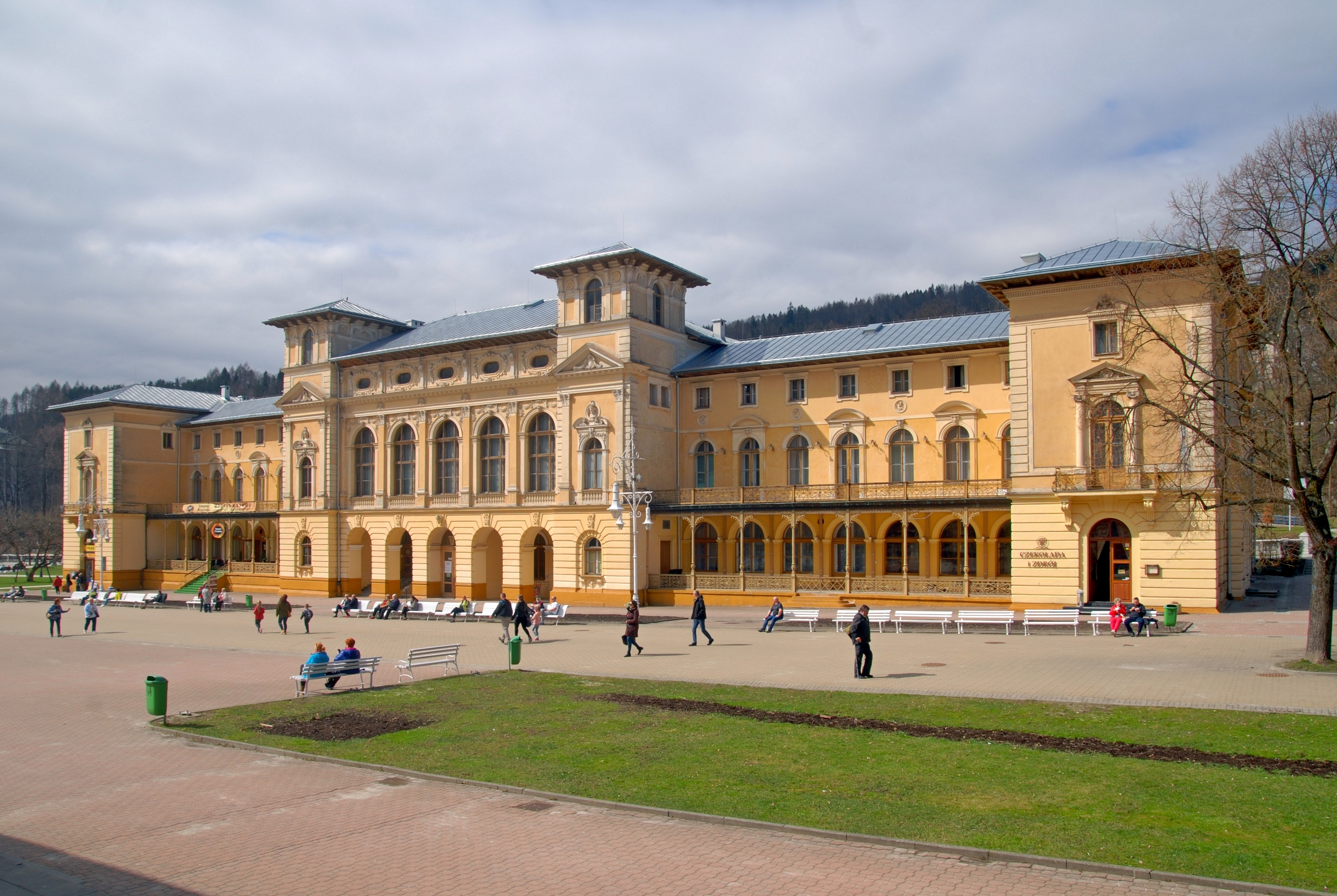
Main drinking house in the spa town of Krynica-Zdrój

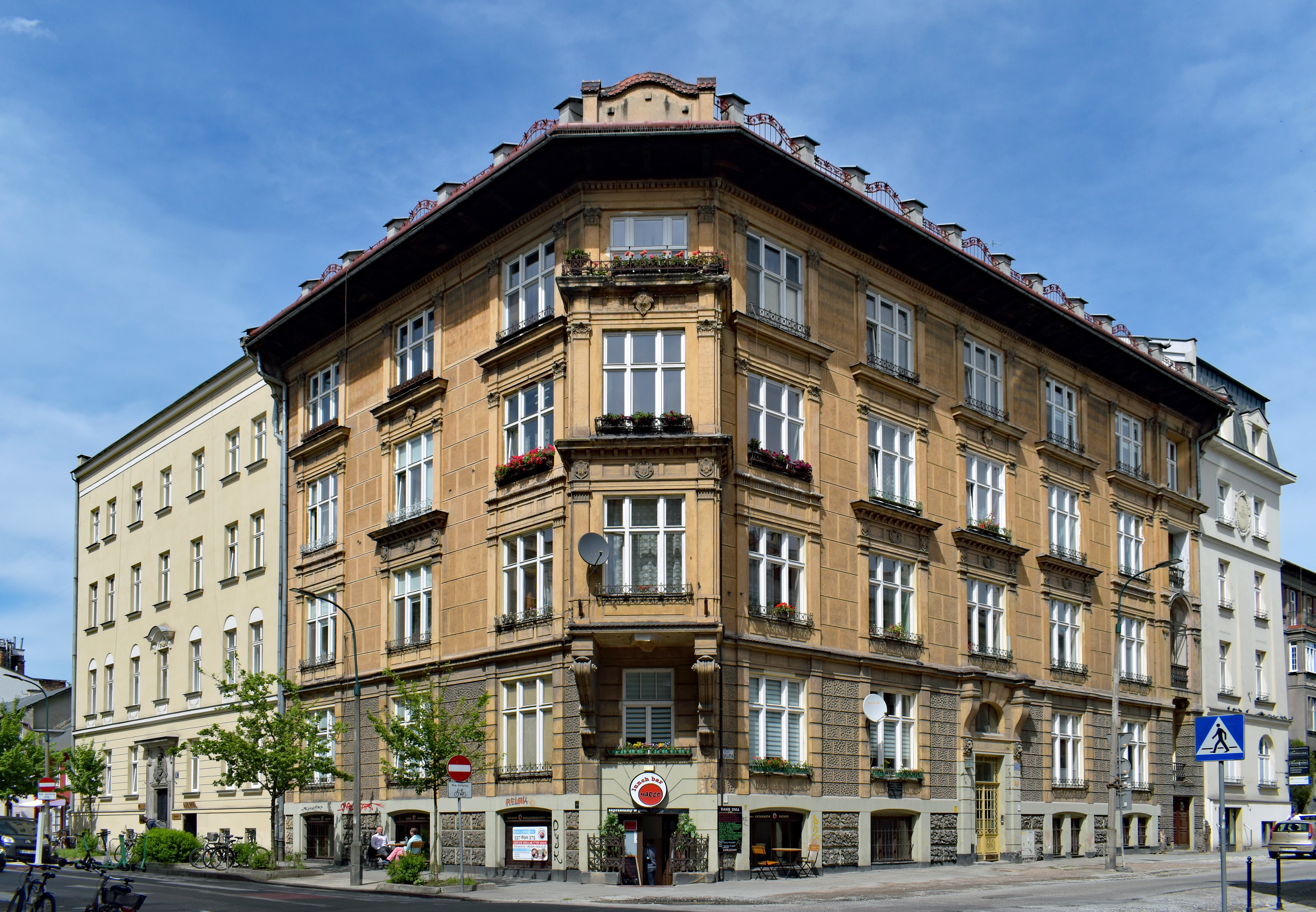
Zawiejski's House, built in 1909, Kraków

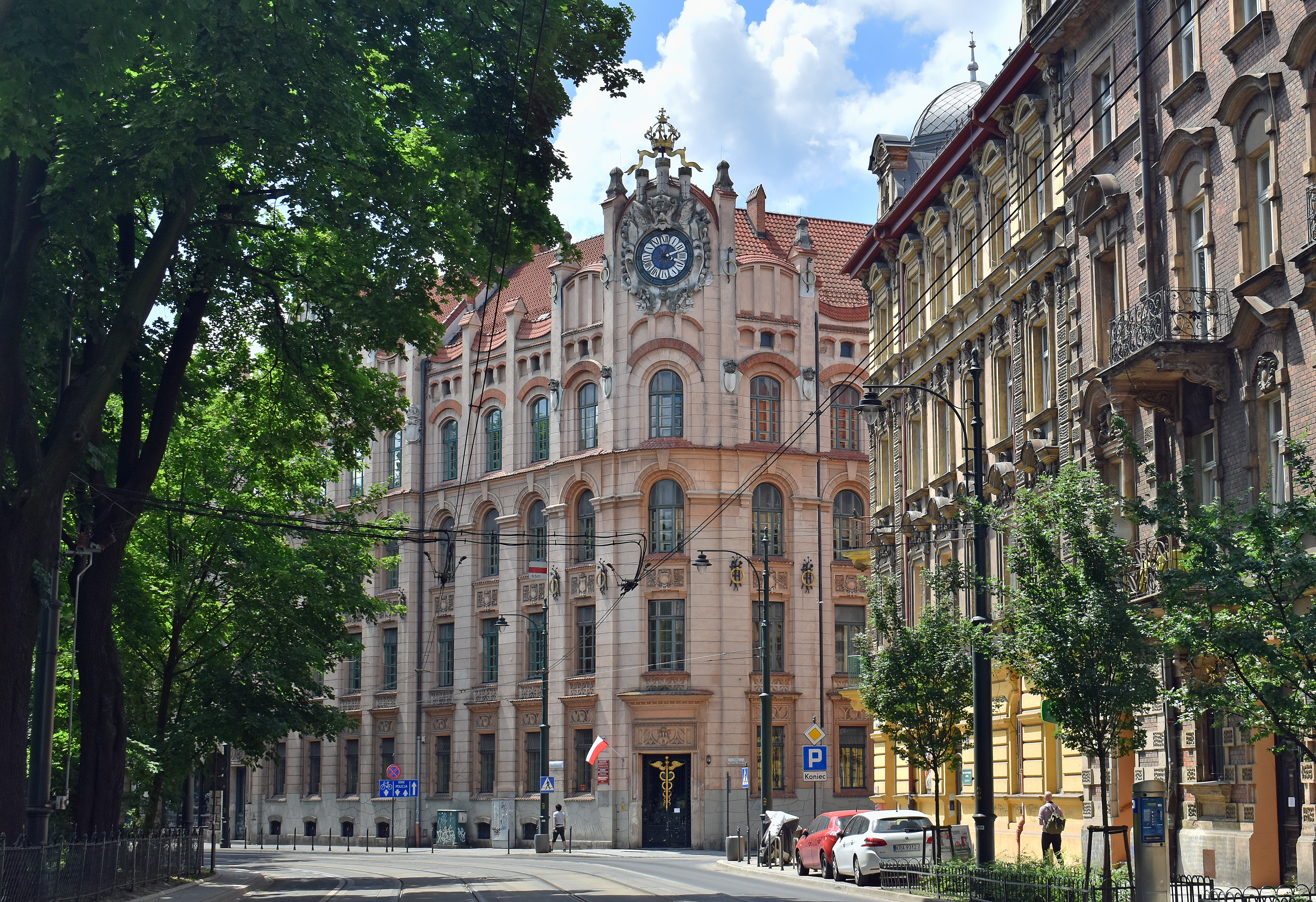
Economic High School, Kraków

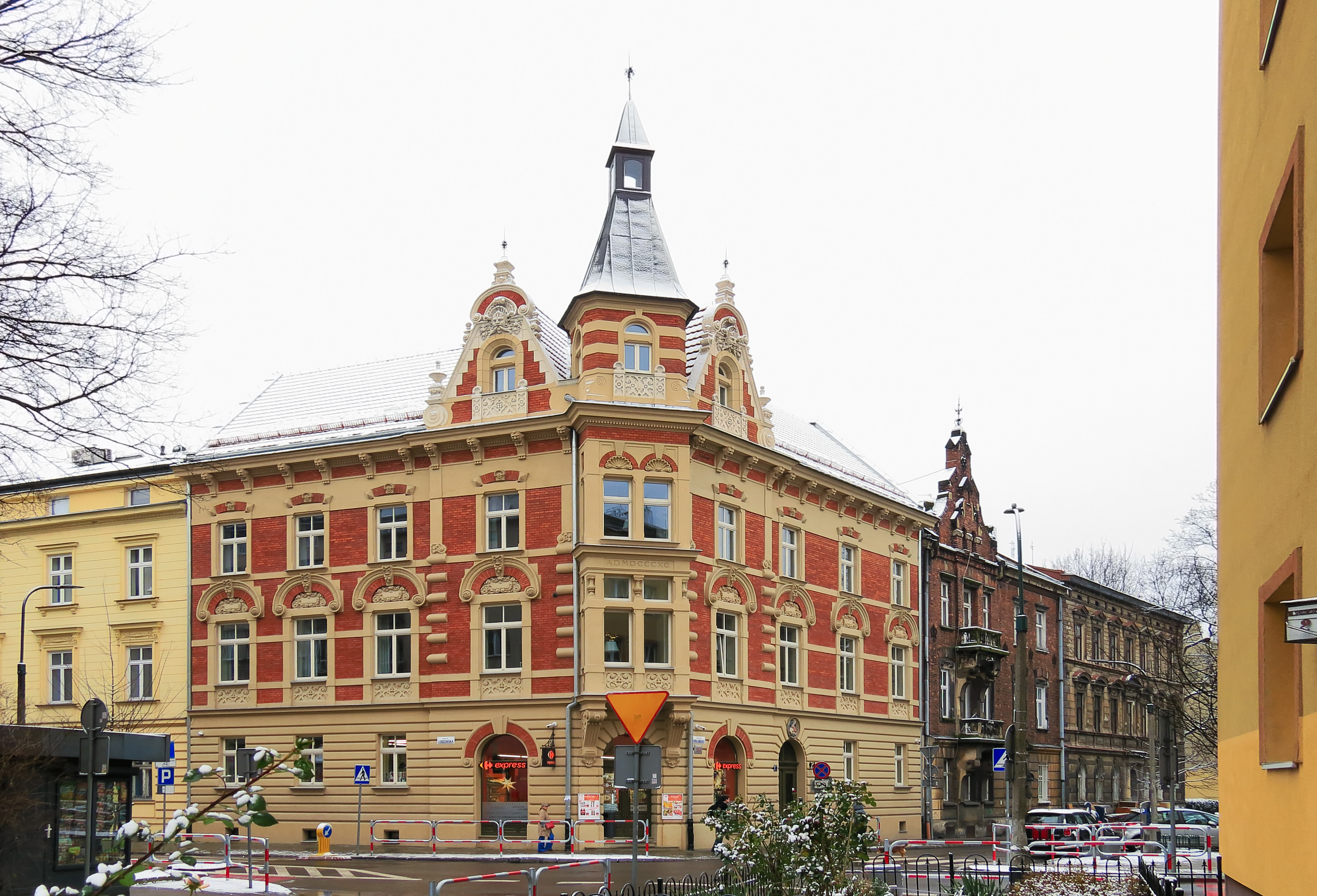
Turnaus' Tenement House, Kraków

== See also ==
- History of Kraków
