= Lenin Museum, Kraków =

Coordinates: 50°04′00″N 19°57′05″E

- Muzeum Lenina w Krakowie
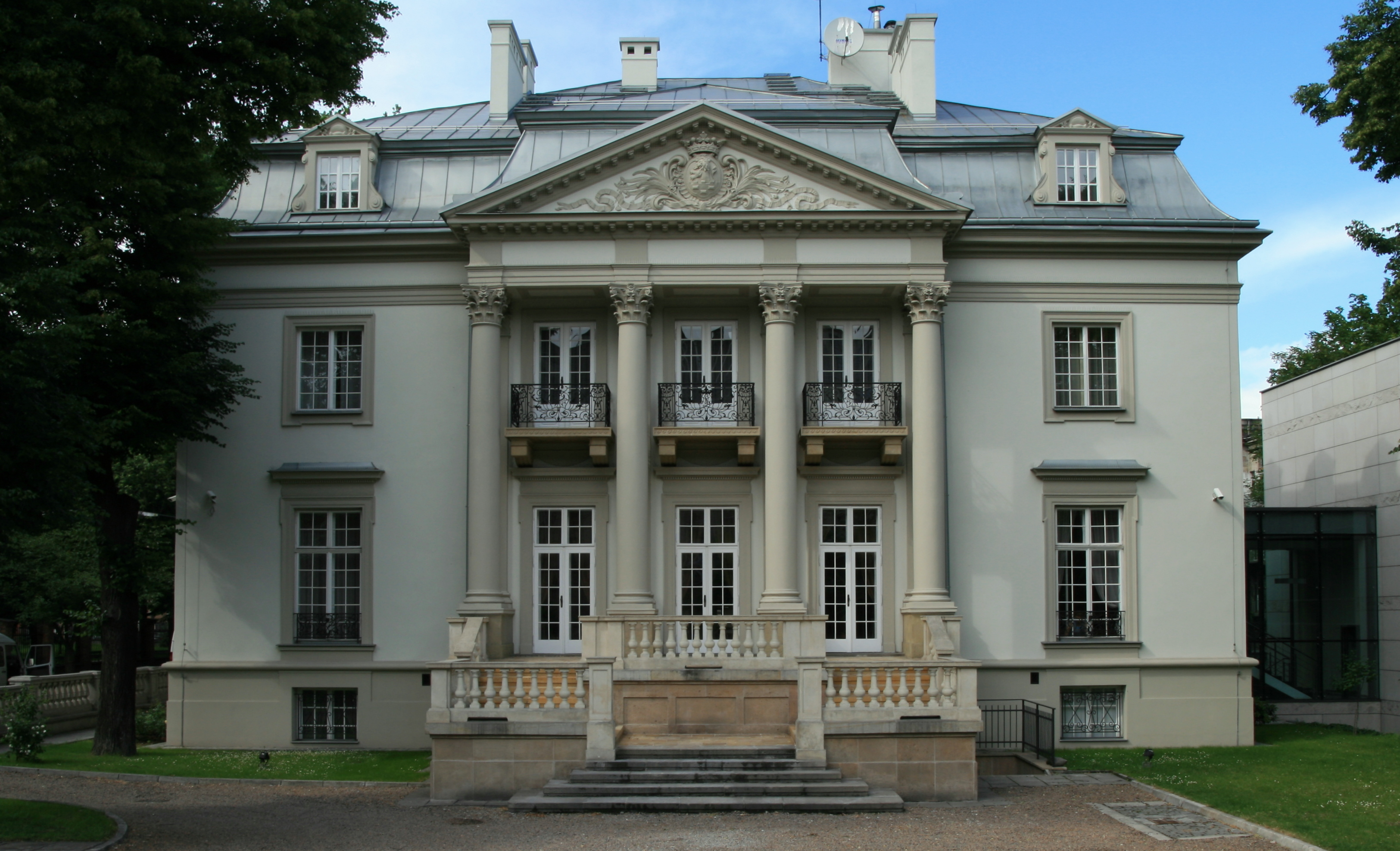

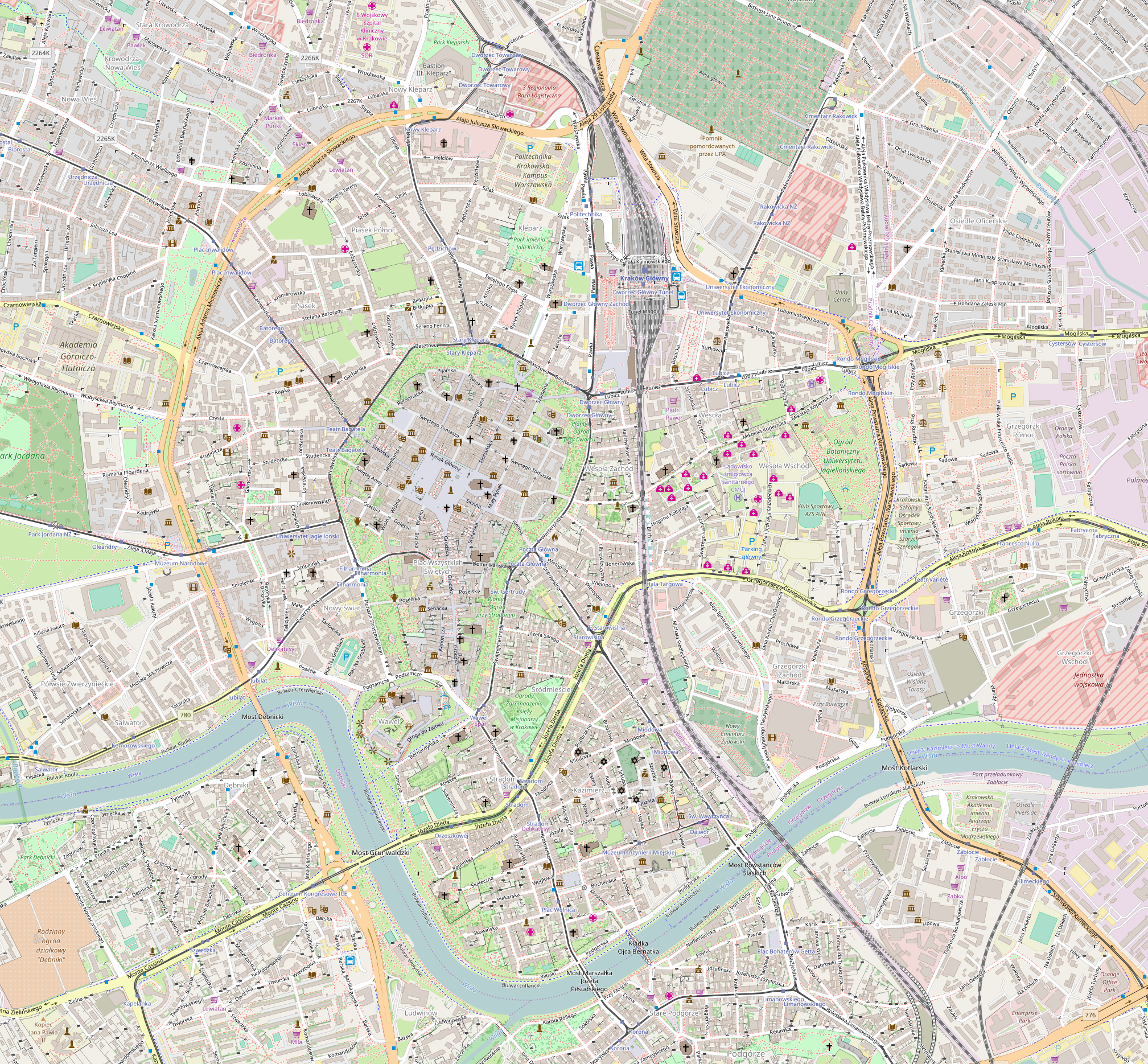
- Location within Central Kraków
- Dissolved: 1989; 37 years ago
- Location: Topolowa St. 5, Kraków, Poland
- Type: Biographical museum

Muzeum Lenina w Krakowie was a museum in Kraków, Poland. It was established in 1954, and closed in 1989.

== History ==
The museum was established in honour of Vladimir Lenin's visit and subsequent stay – in Kraków on 22 June 1912.

It was housed in the Pałac Mańkowskich (en: Palace of the Mańkowskis), the residence of local Indologist Leon Mańkowski. Two satellite museums were established at 41 Queen Hedwiga Street (the house in which Lenin lived) and the mountain village of Poronin where he spent his summers.

Following the events of 1989, as Poland transitioned into capitalist rule, the museum (and its two satellite sites) were closed, and the building became the home of the Provincial Administrative Court.
