= Loretańska Street, Kraków =

Street in Kraków, Poland

Loretańska street
Kraków
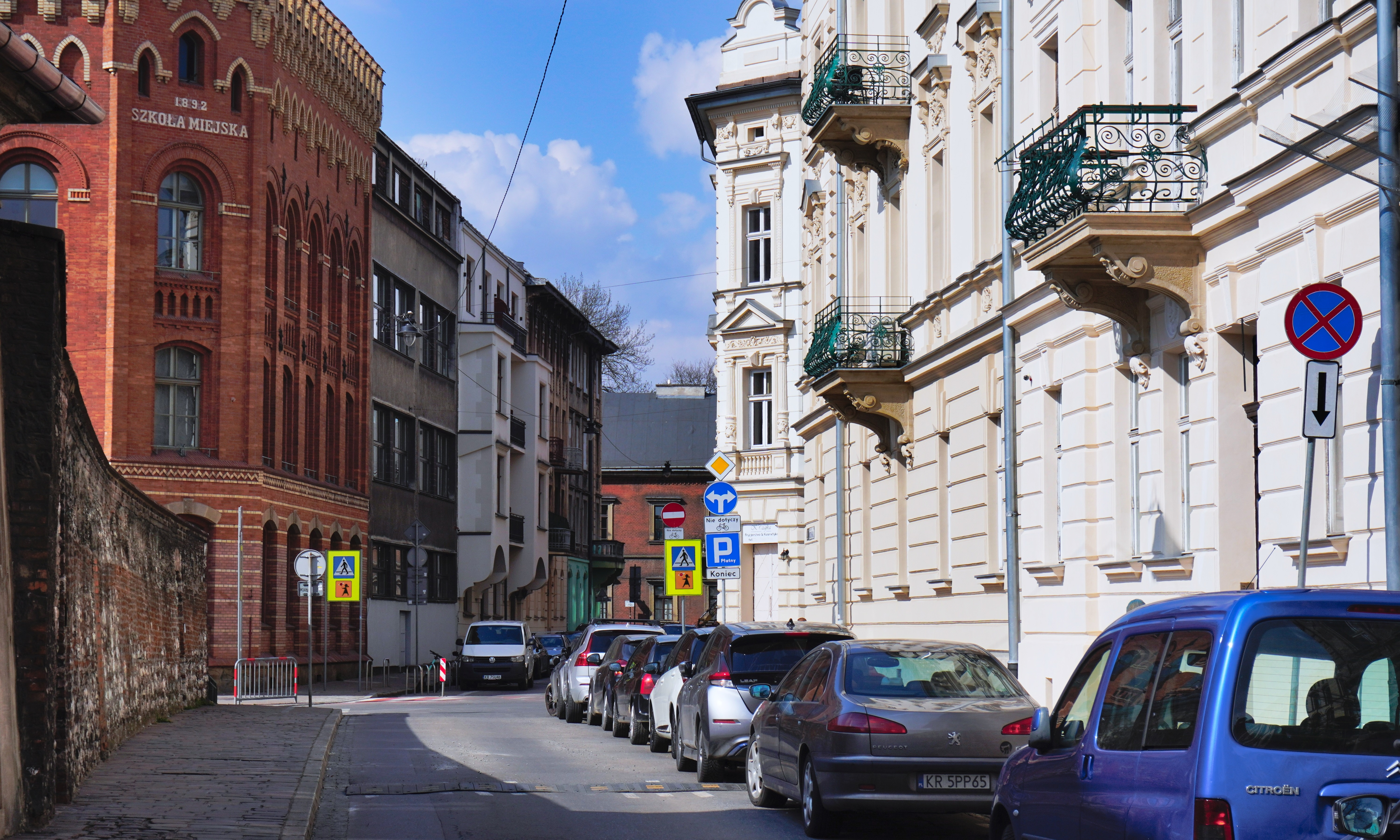
- View of the street
- Interactive map of Loretańska street
- Part of: Kraków Old Town district
- Owner: City of Kraków
- Location: Kraków, Poland

Loretańska Street in Kraków is a street in Kraków, in District I Old Town, in Piasek. It runs meridionally, connecting Krupnicza Street with Jabłonowskich Street.

== History ==
A lane following the course of today's Loretańska Street existed in this location as early as the 15th century, first recorded in 1431, described as "small," "narrow," or "tight" (platea parva, enge gasse, cleyn gasse). In the 17th century, a monastery of the Reformati order was located in this area, which was destroyed during the Swedish Deluge. At the end of that century, a church and monastery of the Capuchin order were built in its place. In the 18th and 19th centuries, the street running along the monastery wall appeared on city maps as unnamed. The current name of the street was assigned around 1880.

== Buildings ==
The current buildings on the street mainly date back to the 1890s and consist of tenement houses with facades in the historicism style, largely designed by Leopold Tlachna.

- 1 Loretańska Street (14 Krupnicza Street) – Tenement house. Designed by Henryk Lamensdorf, 1910–1911.
- 2 Loretańska Street (12 Krupnicza Street) – Tenement house in the Neo-Baroque style. Designed by Leopold Tlachna, 1895.
- 3 Loretańska Street – Tenement house. Designed by Henryk Lamensdorf, 1910.
- 4 Loretańska Street – Tenement house in the Neo-Baroque style. Designed by Leopold Tlachna, 1895.
- 5 Loretańska Street – Tenement house. Designed by Henryk Lamensdorf, 1911.
- 6 Loretańska Street – Tenement house in the Neo-Baroque style with Pompeian polychrome on the staircase. Designed by Leopold Tlachna, 1894.
- 7–9 Loretańska Street (13 Studencka Street) – Primary school, now XLII Liceum Ogólnokształcące (42nd General Education High School), in the Neo-Gothic style. Designed by Stefan Żołdani, 1891–1892.
- 8 Loretańska Street (11 Studencka Street) – Tenement house in the Neo-Baroque style. Designed by Leopold Tlachna, 1893.
- 10 Loretańska Street (8 Studencka Street) – Tenement house in the Neo-Renaissance style. Designed by Leopold Tlachna, 1894–1895.
- 11–11a Loretańska Street – Church of the Annunciation of the Blessed Virgin Mary, Capuchin monastery, and Loretto house.
- 12 Loretańska Street – Tenement house in the Neo-Renaissance style. Designed by Leopold Tlachna, 1894.
- 14 Loretańska Street (7 Kapucyńska Street) – Tenement house in the Neo-Renaissance style. Designed by Leopold Tlachna, 1894–1895.
- 16–18 Loretańska Street (6 Kapucyńska Street) – St. Hedwig School, now the Energy Technical School Complex, in the Art Nouveau style. Designed by Jan Zawiejski, 1904–1907.
- 20 Loretańska Street (9 Jabłonowskich Street) – Tenement house. Designed by Karol Rybiński, 1900.
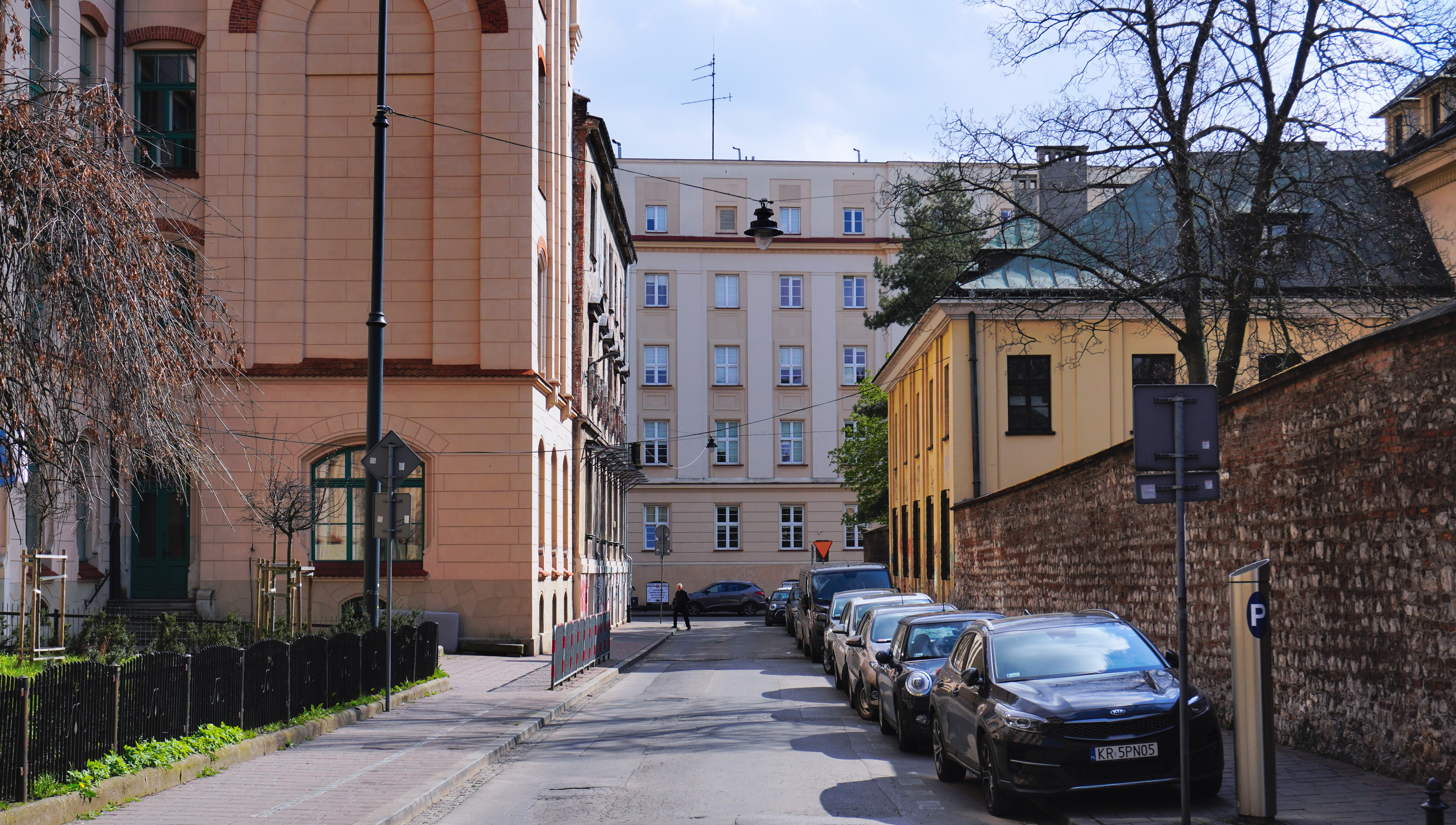
View from the intersection with Kapucyńska Street to the south

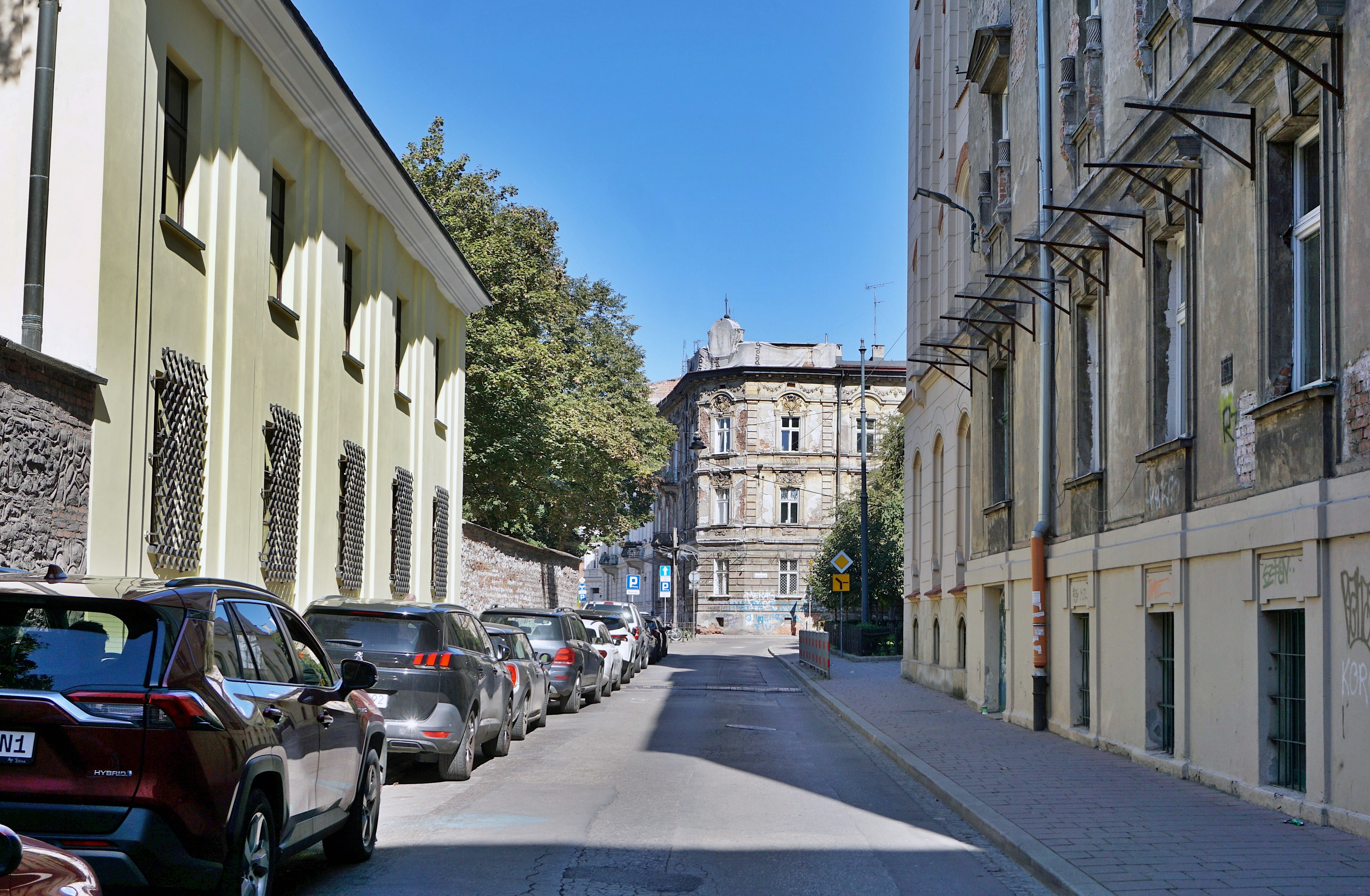
View north from the intersection with Jabłonowskich Street

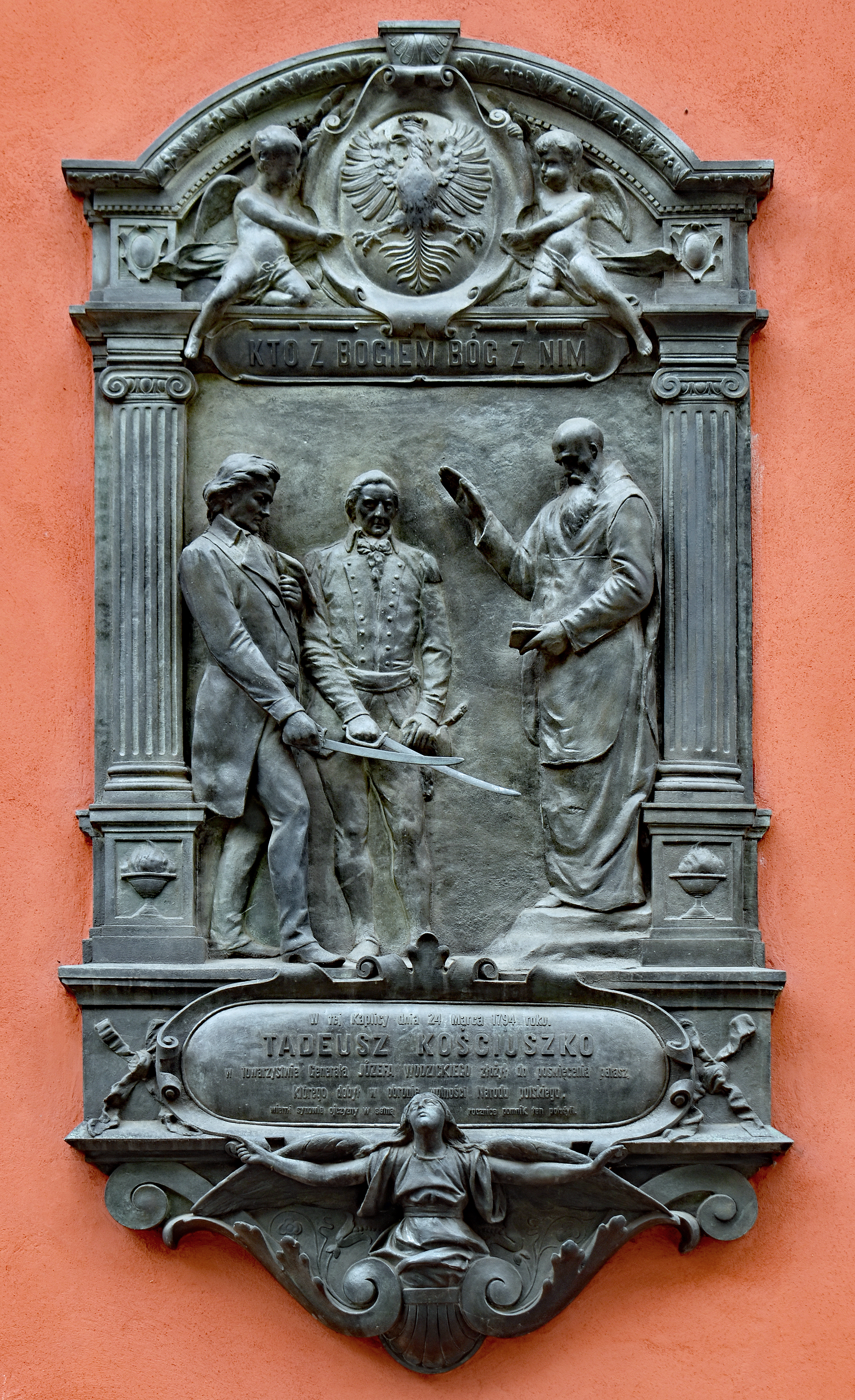
Ordination of broadswords by A. Daun (1896) at the Loreto house

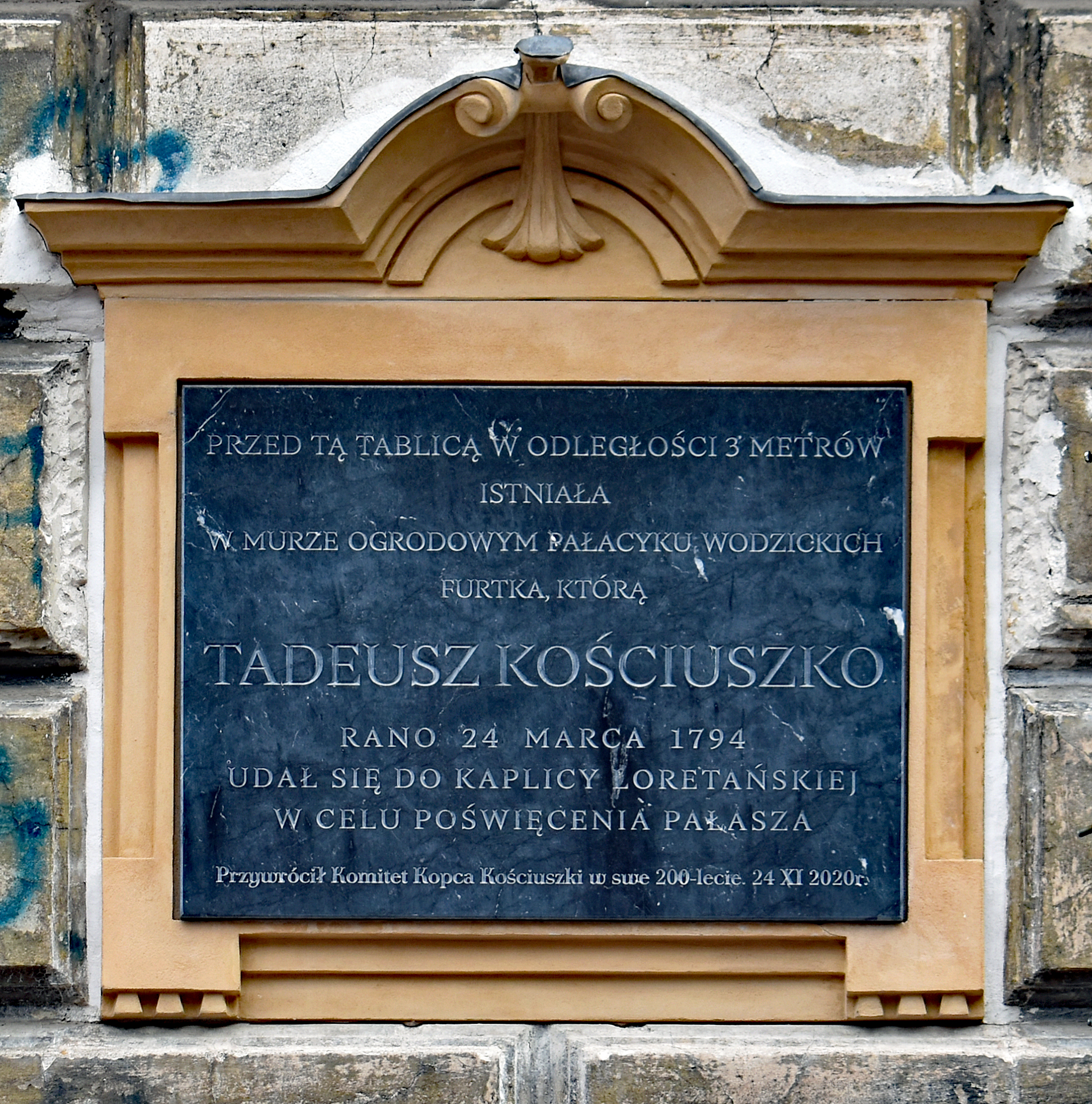
Commemorative plaque to T. Kościuszko
14 Loretańska Street

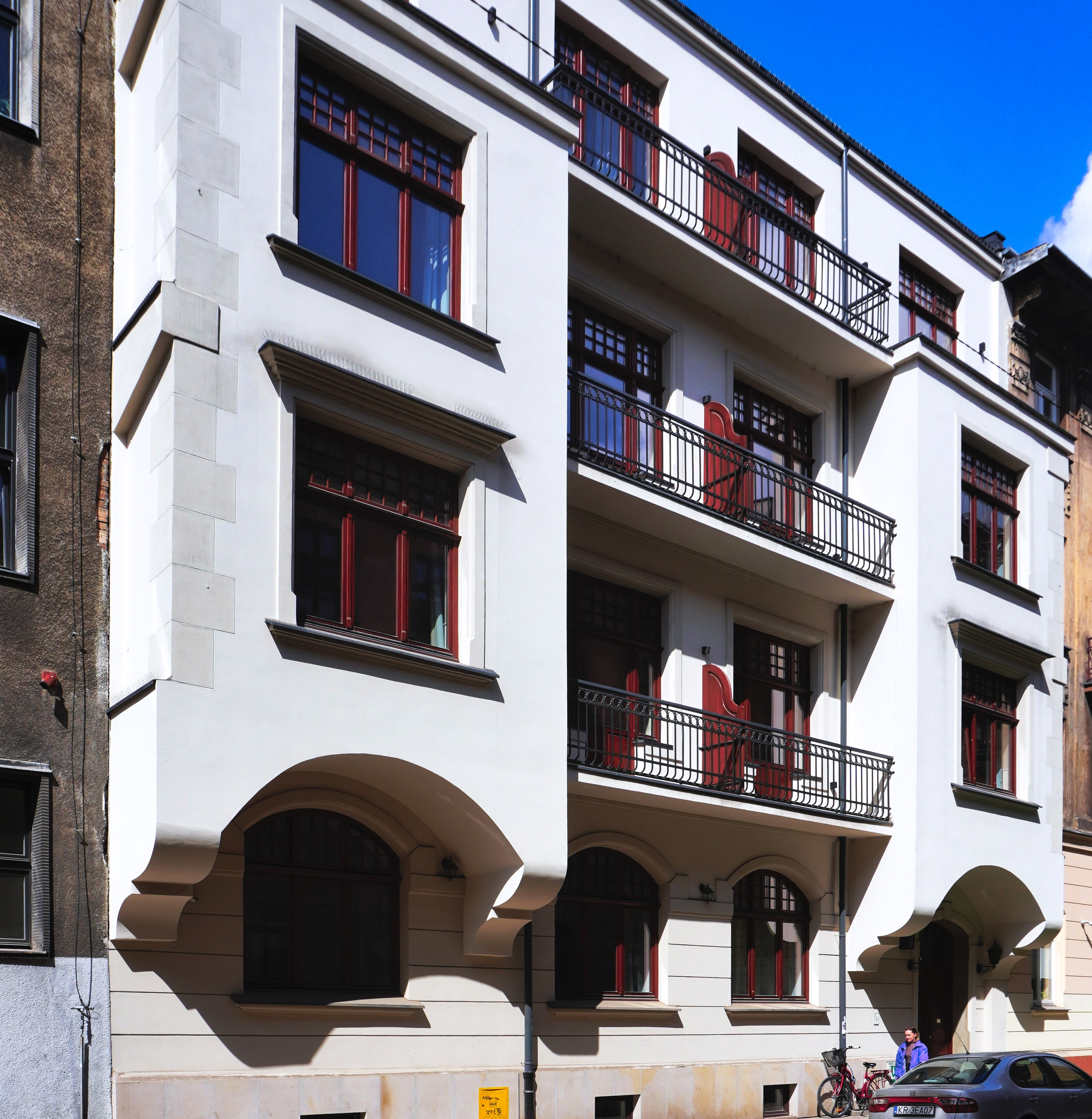
5 Loretańska Street
Tenement house (design. Henryk Lamensdorf, 1911)

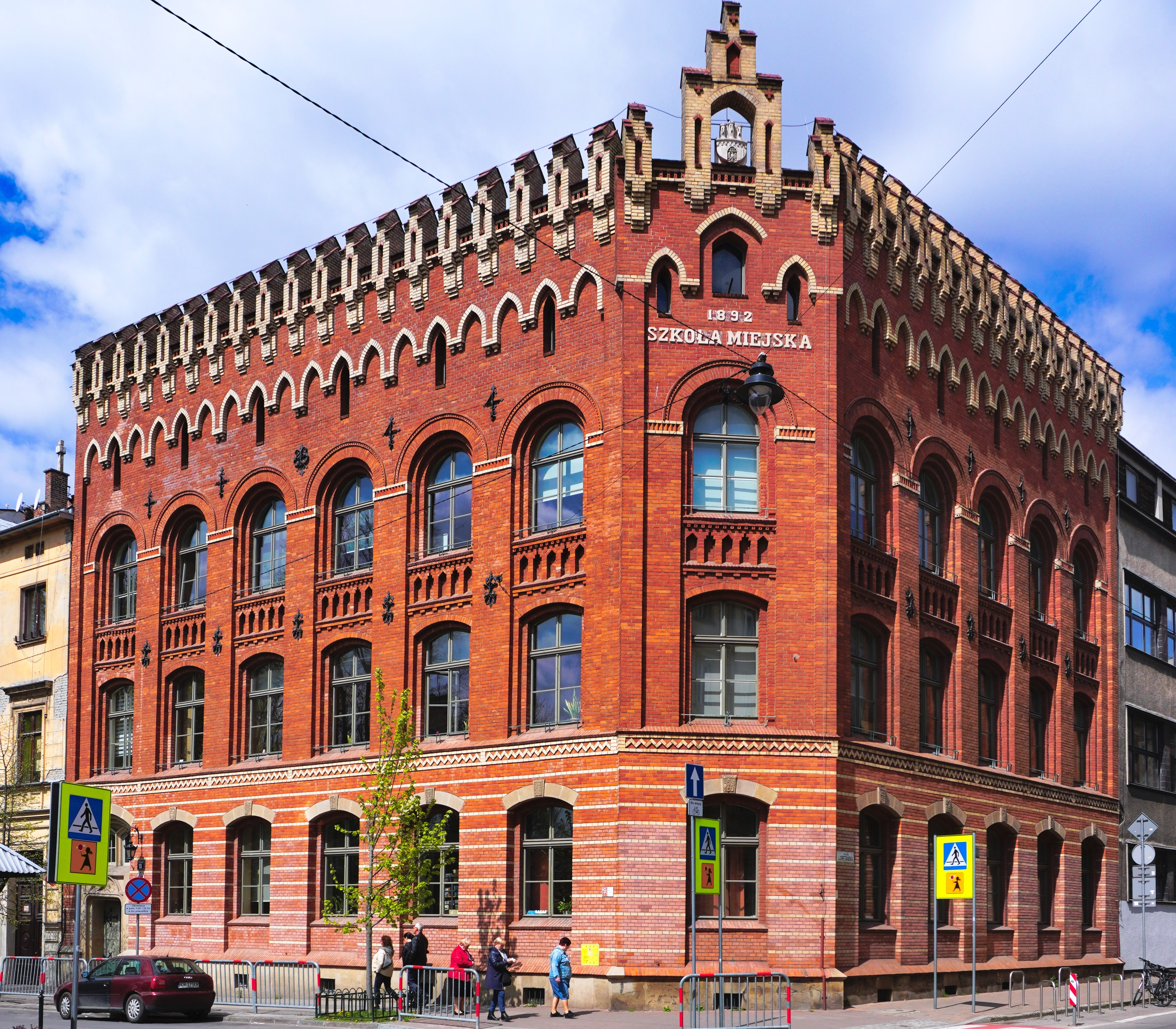
7–9 Loretańska Street (13 Studencka Street)
City School, currently the No. 12 Secondary School (design. Stefan Żołdani, 1891–1892)

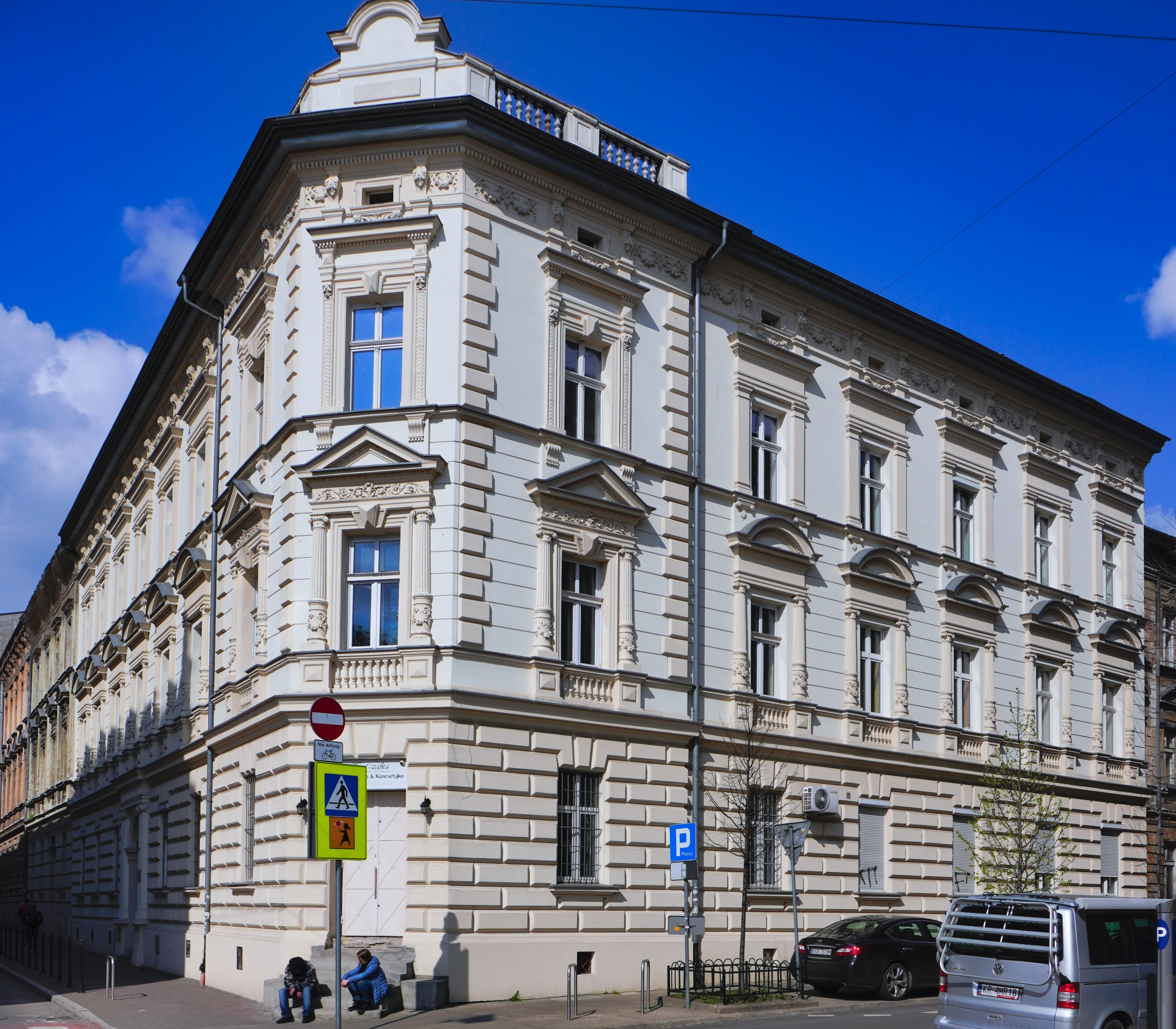
8 Loretańska Street (11 Studencka Street)
Tenement house (design. Leopold Tlachna, 1893)

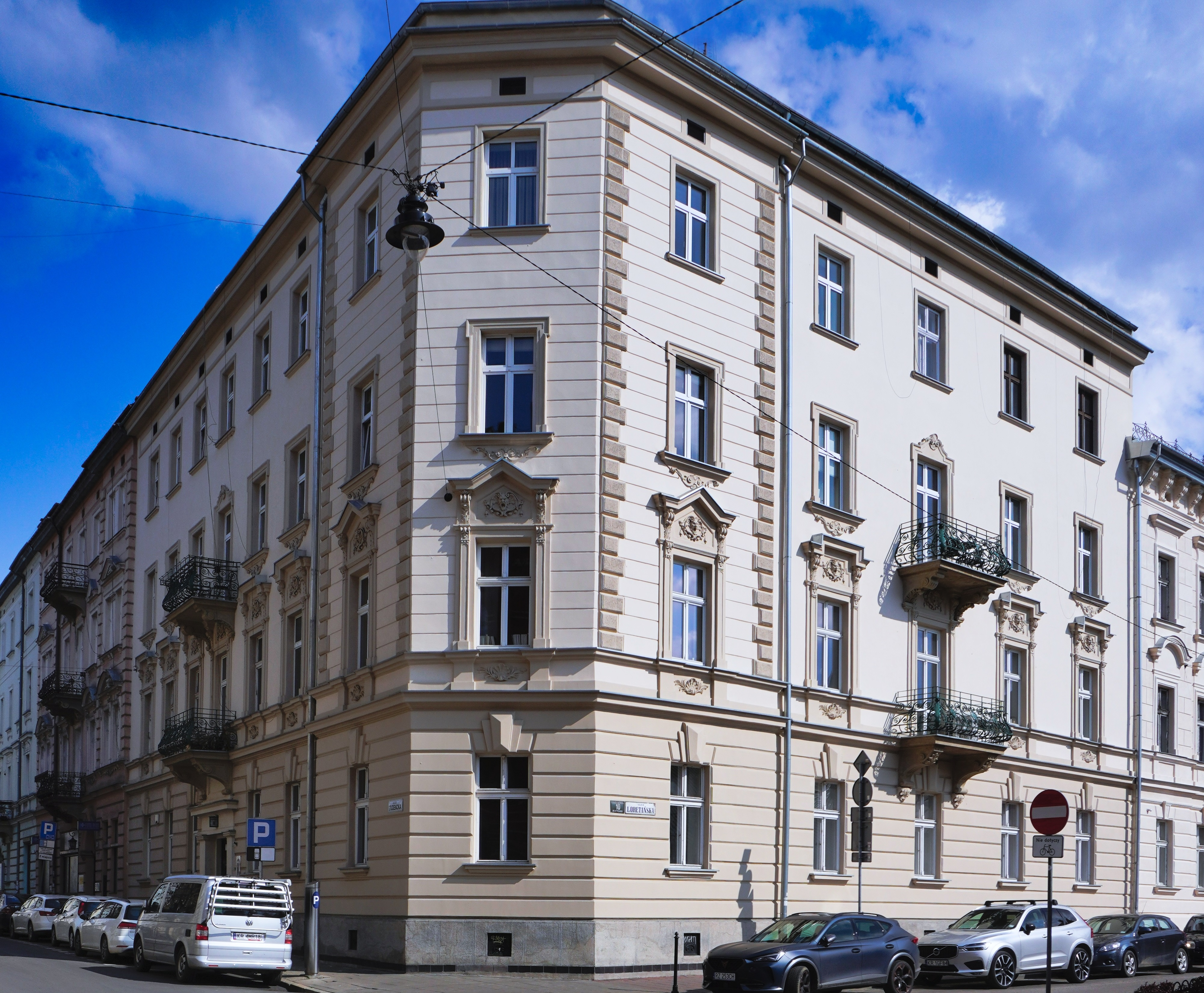
10 Loretańska Street (8 Studencka Street)
Tenement house (design. Leopold Tlachna, 1894–1895)

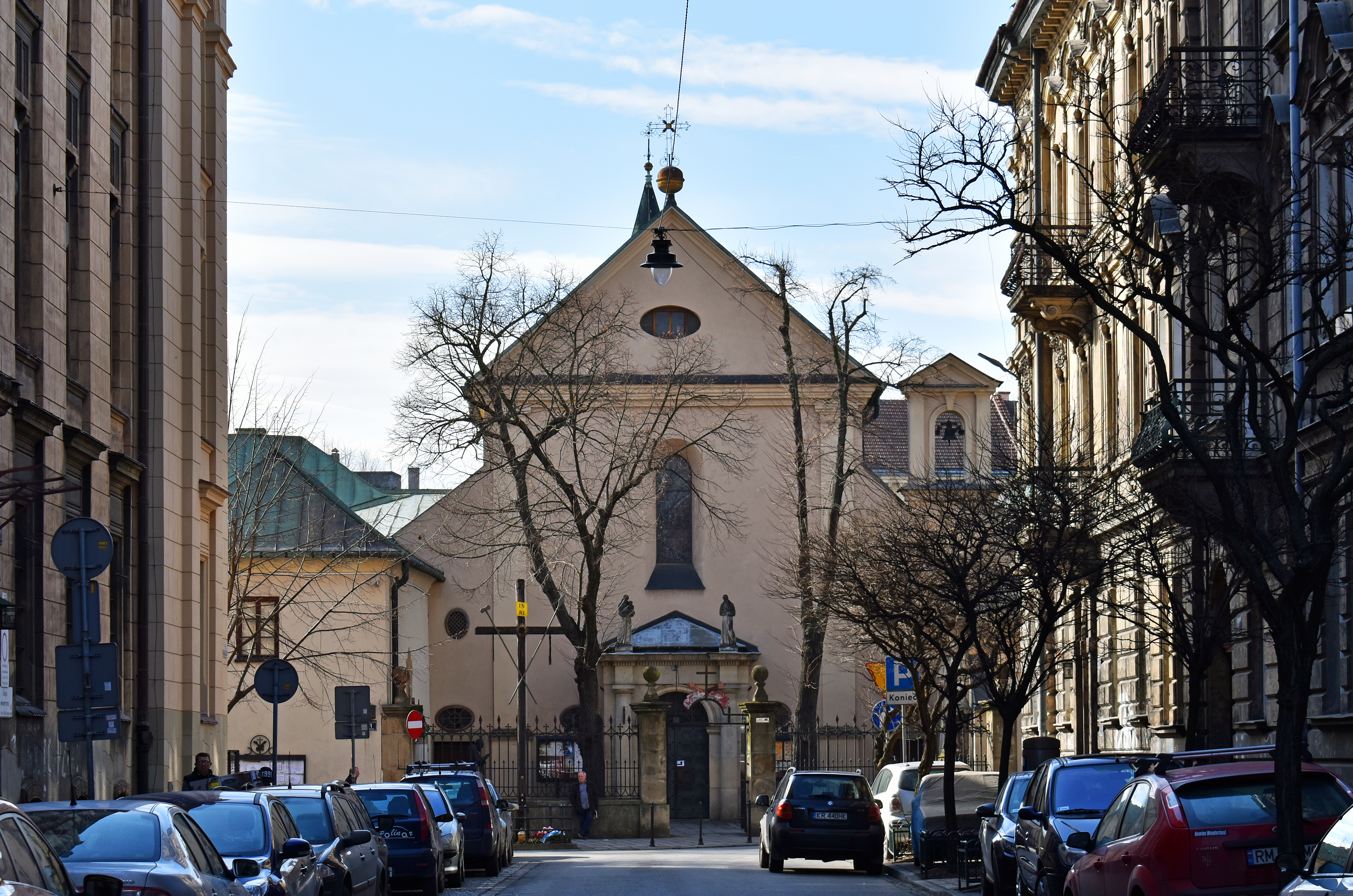
11 Loretańska Street
Church of the Annunciation of the Blessed Virgin Mary

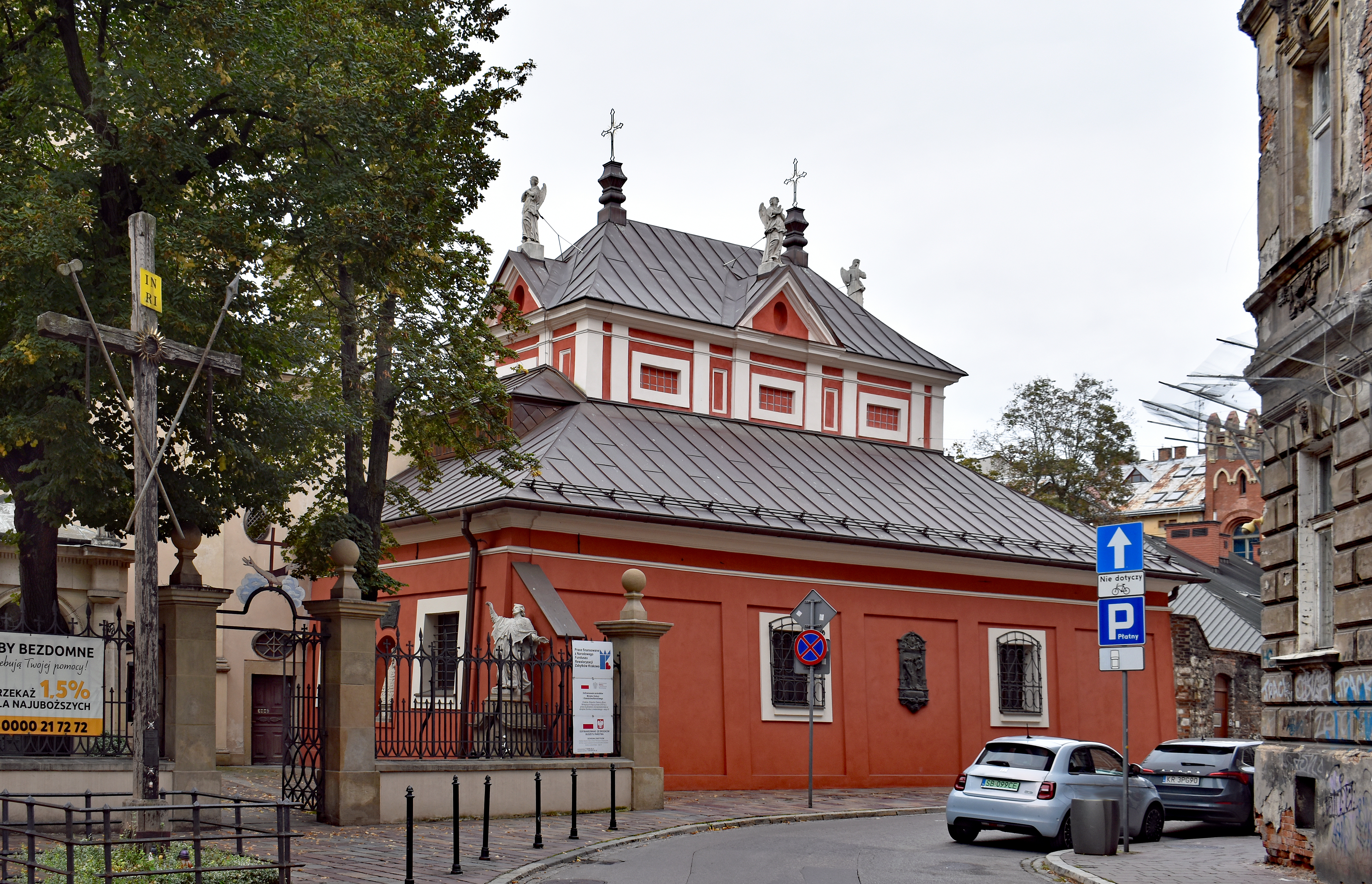
11 Loretańska Street
Loreto house (Domek loretański)

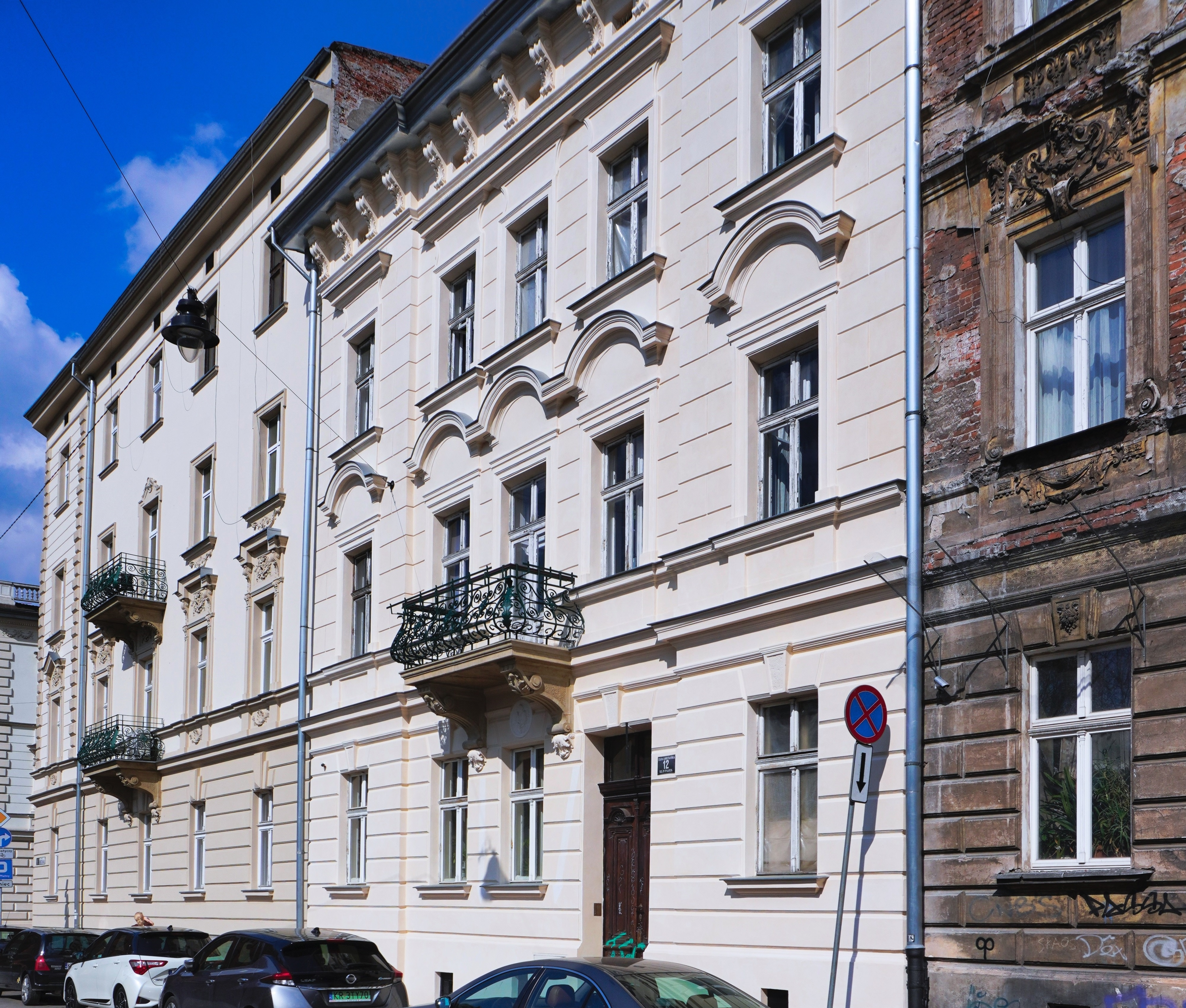
12 Loretańska Street
Tenement house (design. Leopold Tlachna, 1894)

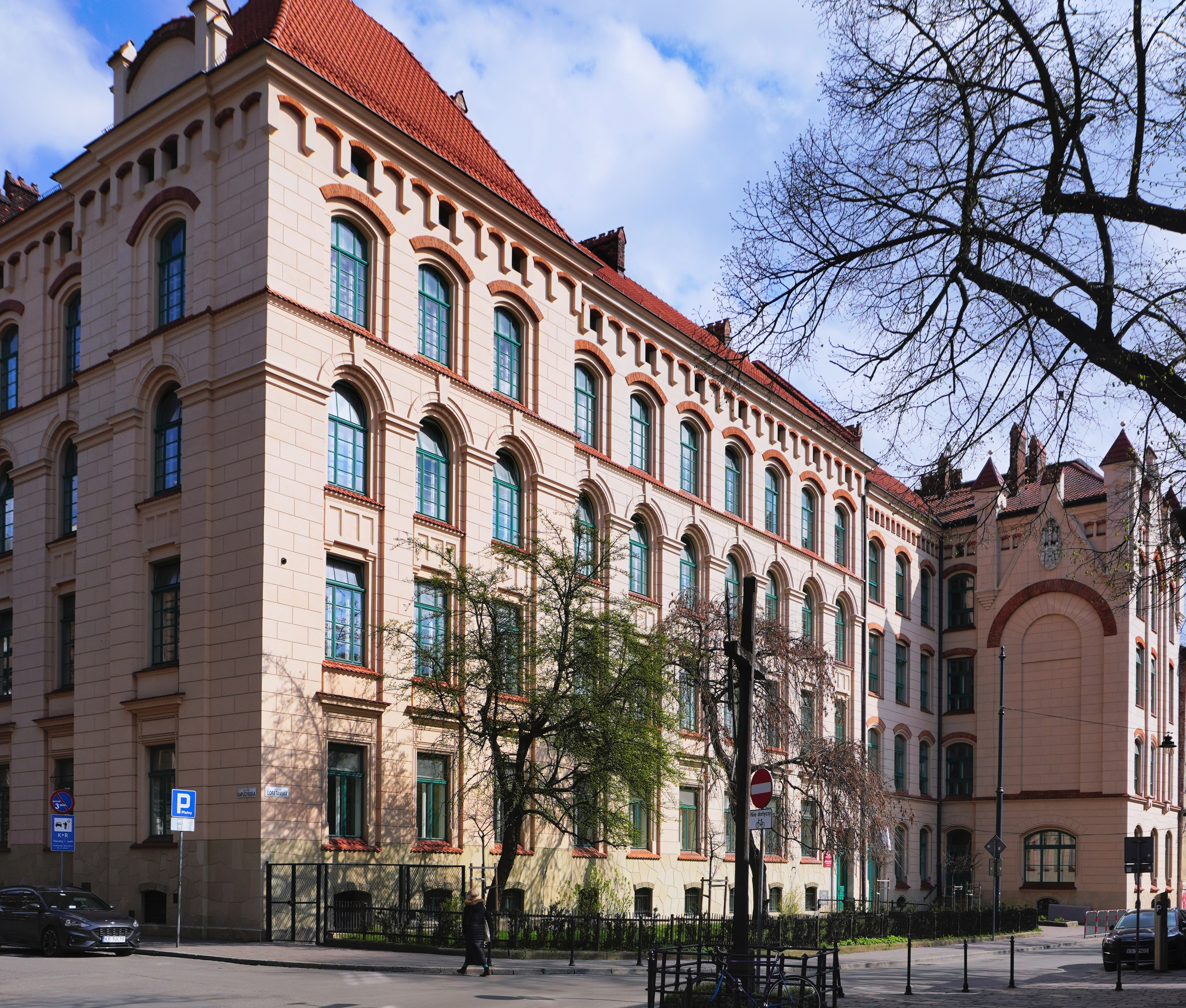
16–18 Loretańska Street (6 Kapucyńska Street)
Szkoła Powszechna, obecnie Zespół Szkół Energetycznych (design. Jan Zawiejski, 1904–1907)
