= Kapucyńska Street =

Street in Kraków, Poland

Kapucyńska street
Kraków
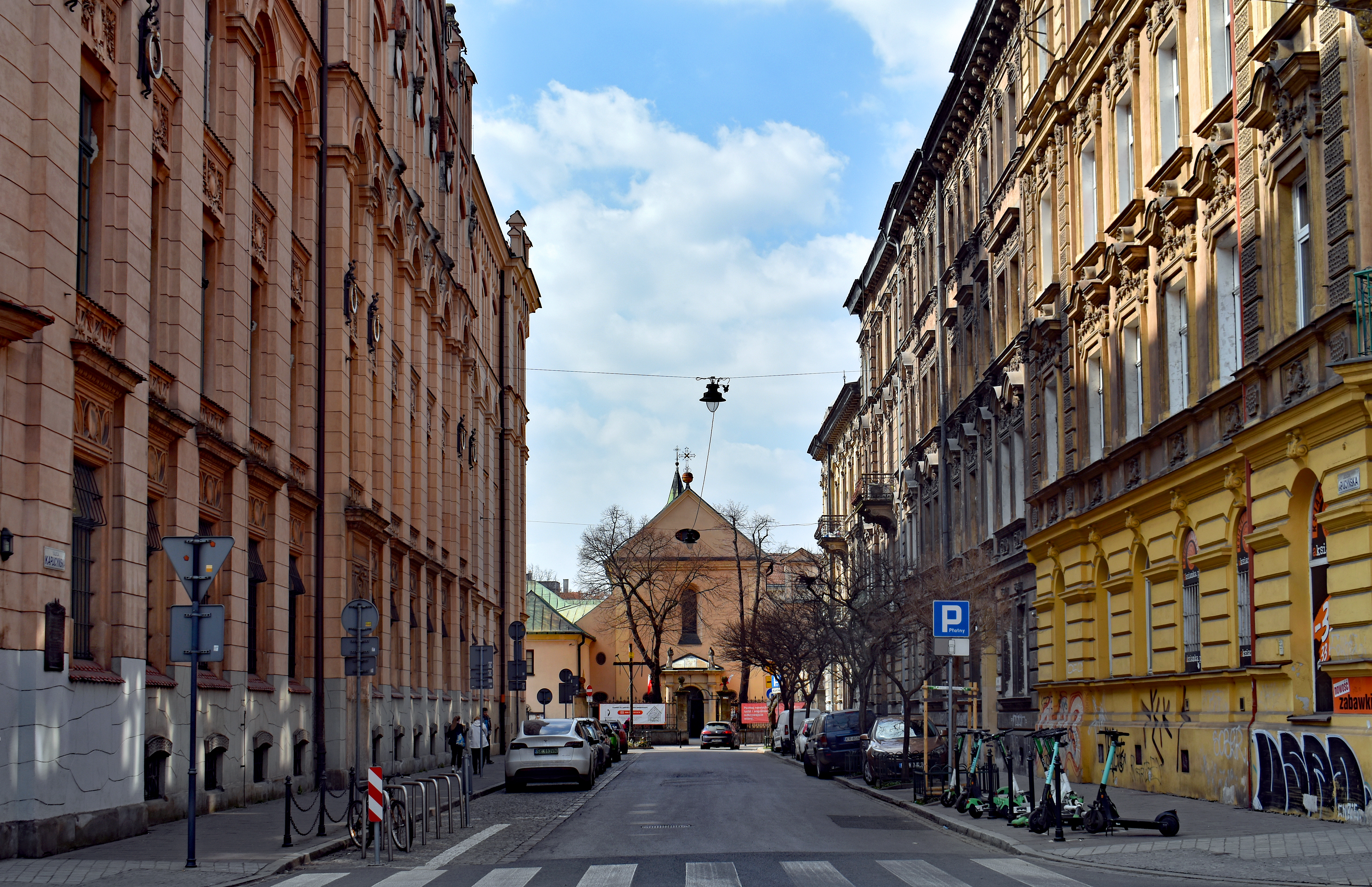
- View to the west from the intersection with Straszewskiego Street. On the left Nowy Świat, on the right and straight ahead Piasek. The street perspective is closed by the Capuchin Church.
- Interactive map of Kapucyńska street
- Part of: Kraków Old Town district
- Owner: City of Kraków
- Location: Kraków, Poland

Historic Monument of Poland
- Designated: 1994-09-08
- Part of: Kraków historical city complex
- Reference no.: M.P. 1994 nr 50 poz. 418

Kapucyńska Street is a street in Kraków, located in district Old Town, separating Nowy Świat from Piasek.

It connects Loretańska Street with Podwale Street. It is a single-lane street.

== History ==
In the 16th century, a jurydyka (private town) called Ogrodniki was located in the area of today's street. The street existed in the 19th century as an unnamed road and received its current name in 1881. The name is associated with the Capuchin monastery and church, which has been present there since 1699.

Previously, a monastery of the Reformati order was also located in this area, but it was destroyed during the Swedish Deluge. A new monastery was later built on today's Reformacka Street. Until 1880, the name "Kapucyńska" also applied to part of the neighboring Podwale Street.

At the intersection with Podwale Street, there once stood a column with a statue of Our Lady of Grace, which previously adorned the gate of the St. Mary's Cemetery, closed in 1796. The statue was purchased by the Capuchins and placed at the end of the street. In 1941, it was moved to the Planty Park, where it now stands at the end of Jagiellońska Street.

The street separates two historic districts: Piasek and Nowy Świat. The former was listed in Registry of Cultural Property on October 15, 2015, under the number A-1446/M, while the latter was registered earlier, on June 9, 2015, under the number A-1438/M.

== Buildings ==
Odd-numbered side (Piasek):

Until the end of the 19th century, this area was occupied by the garden of the Wodzicki manor. The manor and garden were sold, divided into plots, and later developed with tenement houses.

- 1 Kapucyńska Street (1 Podwale Street) – Tenement house, 1893.
- 3 Kapucyńska Street – Tenement house. Designed by Leopold Tlachna, 1893.
- 5 Kapucyńska Street – Tenement house. Designed by Leopold Tlachna, 1895.
- 7 Kapucyńska Street (14 Loretańska Street) – Tenement house. Designed by Leopold Tlachna, 1894.

Even-numbered side (Nowy Świat):

Until the end of the 19th century, this side of the street was occupied by a military riding school (Reitschule), which burned down in 1897. Two schools were later built in its place.

- 2 Kapucyńska Street (29 Florian Straszewski Street) – Building of the former Commercial Academy. Designed by Jan Zawiejski, 1904–1906.
- 6 Kapucyńska Street (corner with 16 Loretańska Street) – Former St. Hedwig's School. Designed by Jan Zawiejski, 1905–1906.
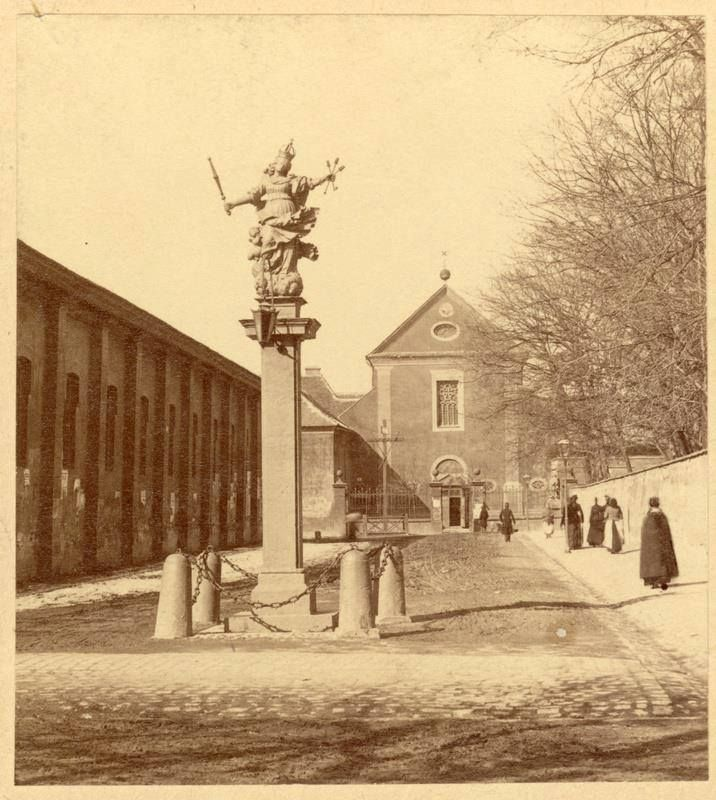
The street before 1897.
On the left the riding school, on the right the Wodzicki garden

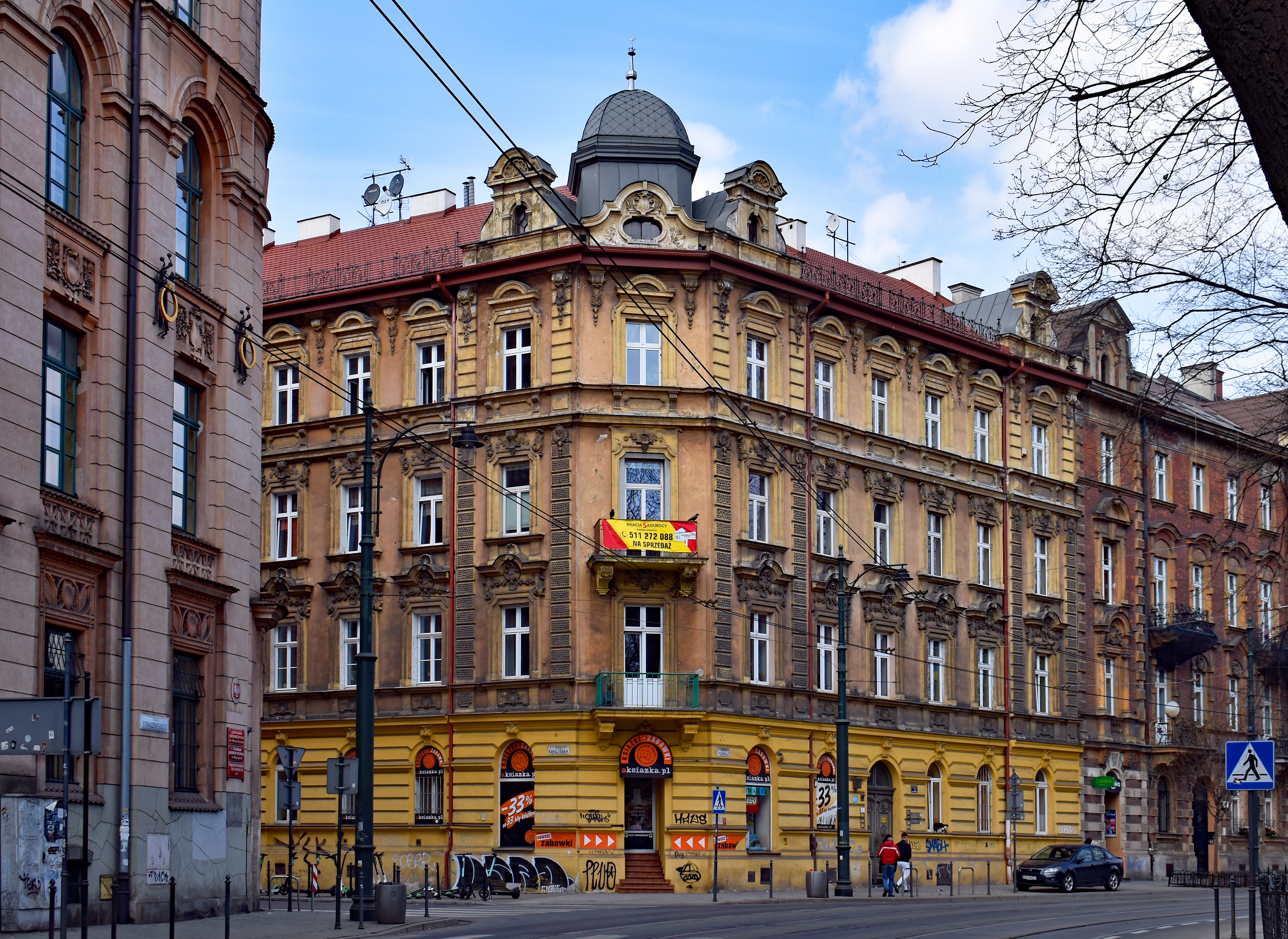
1 Kapucyńska Street (1 Podwale Street)
Tenement house (1893)

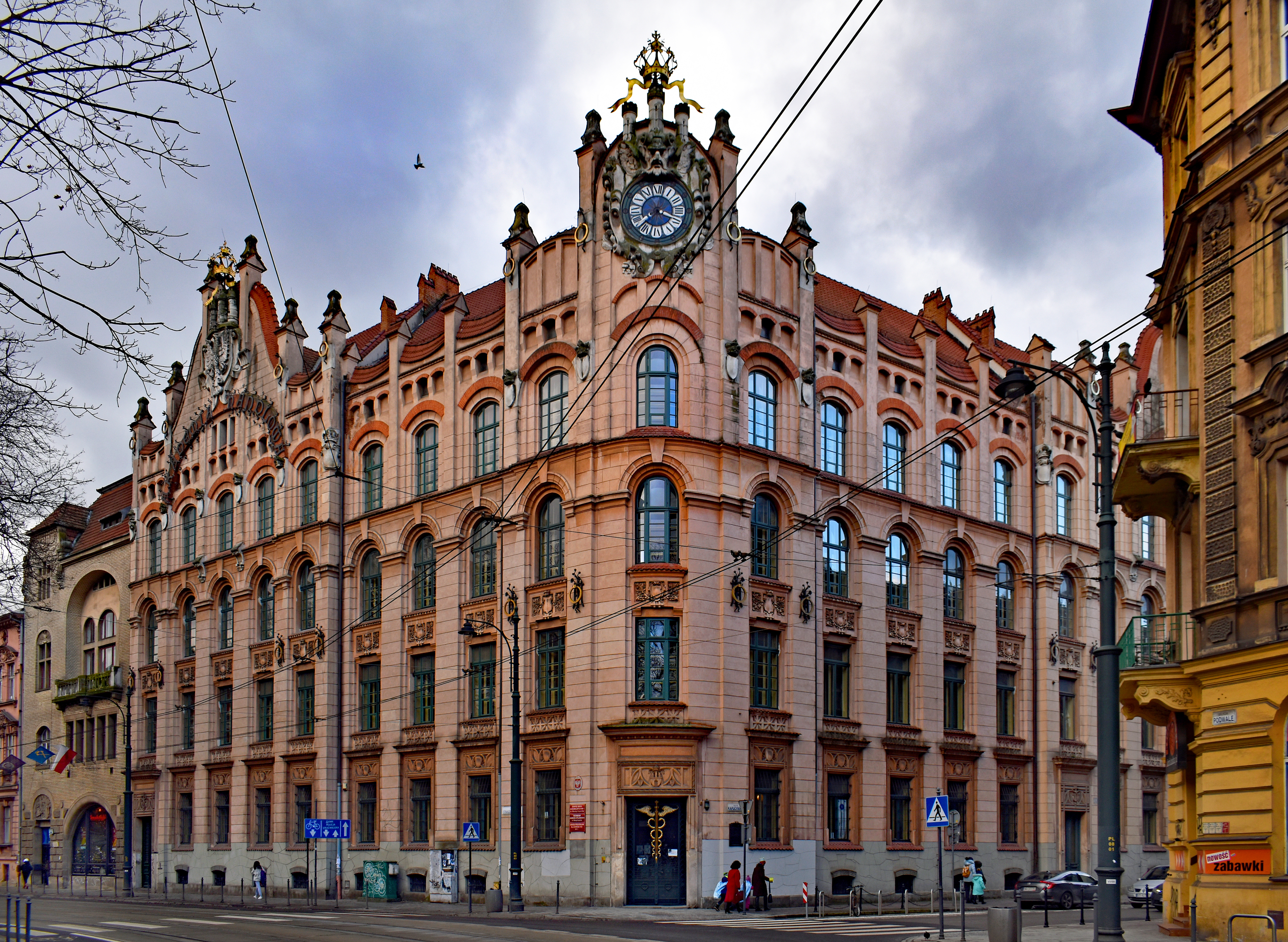
2 Kapucyńska Street (29 Florian Straszewski Street)
The building of the former Academy of Commerce

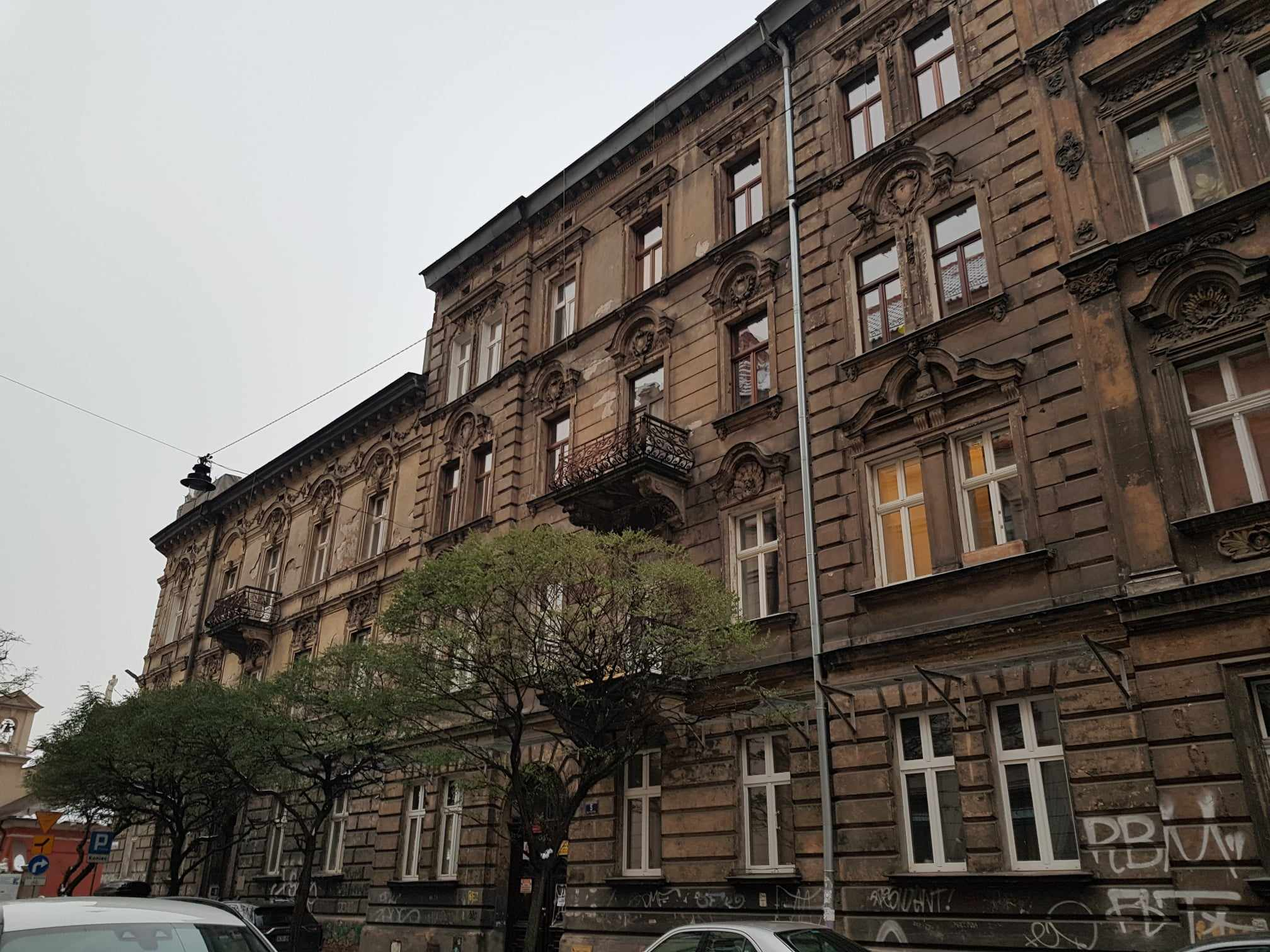
5 Kapucyńska Street
Tenement house (design. Leopold Tlachna, 1895)

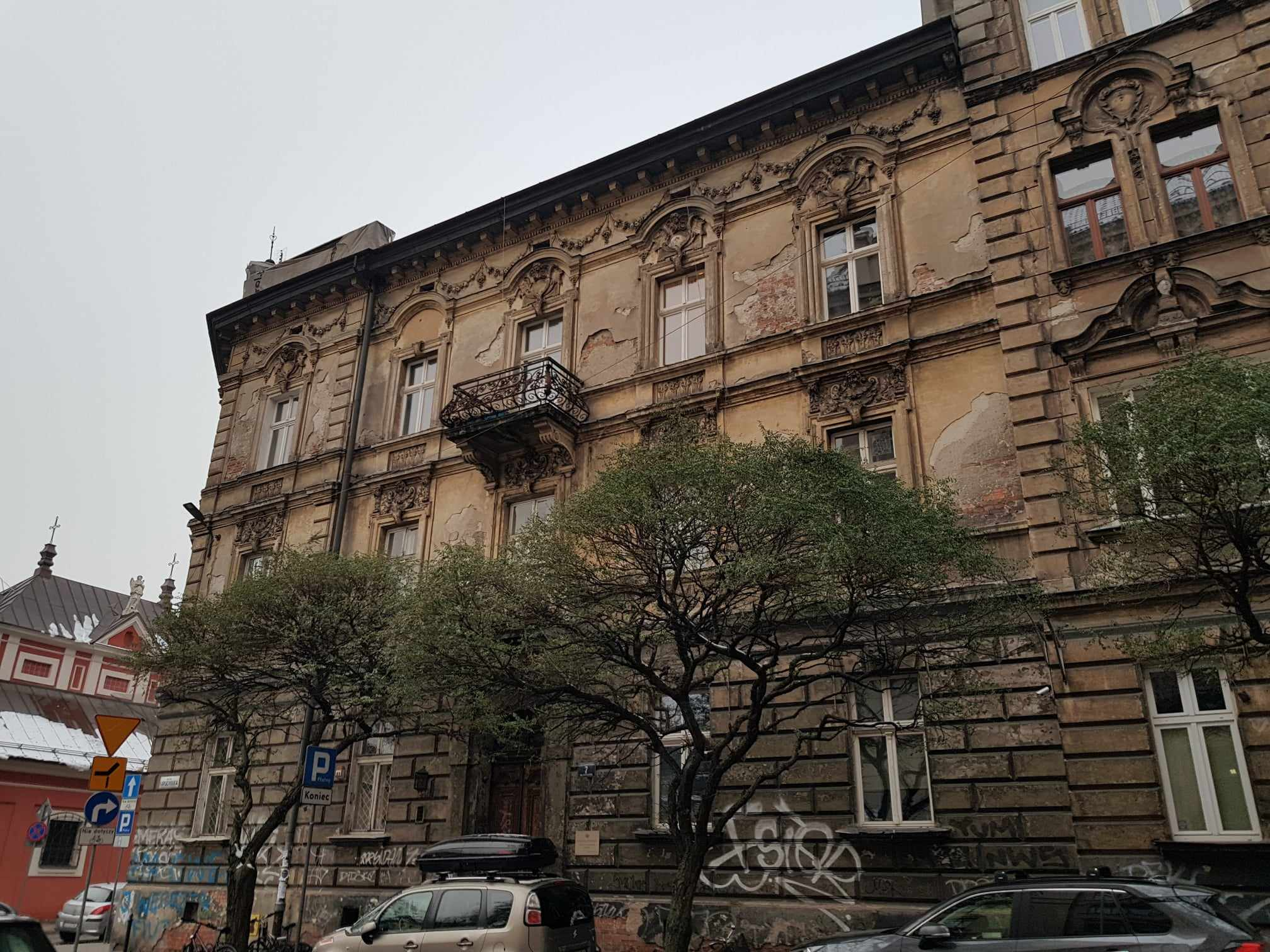
7 Kapucyńska Street
Tenement house (design. Leopold Tlachna, 1894)
