= Jabłonowskich Street =

Street in Kraków, Poland

Jabłonowskich street
Kraków
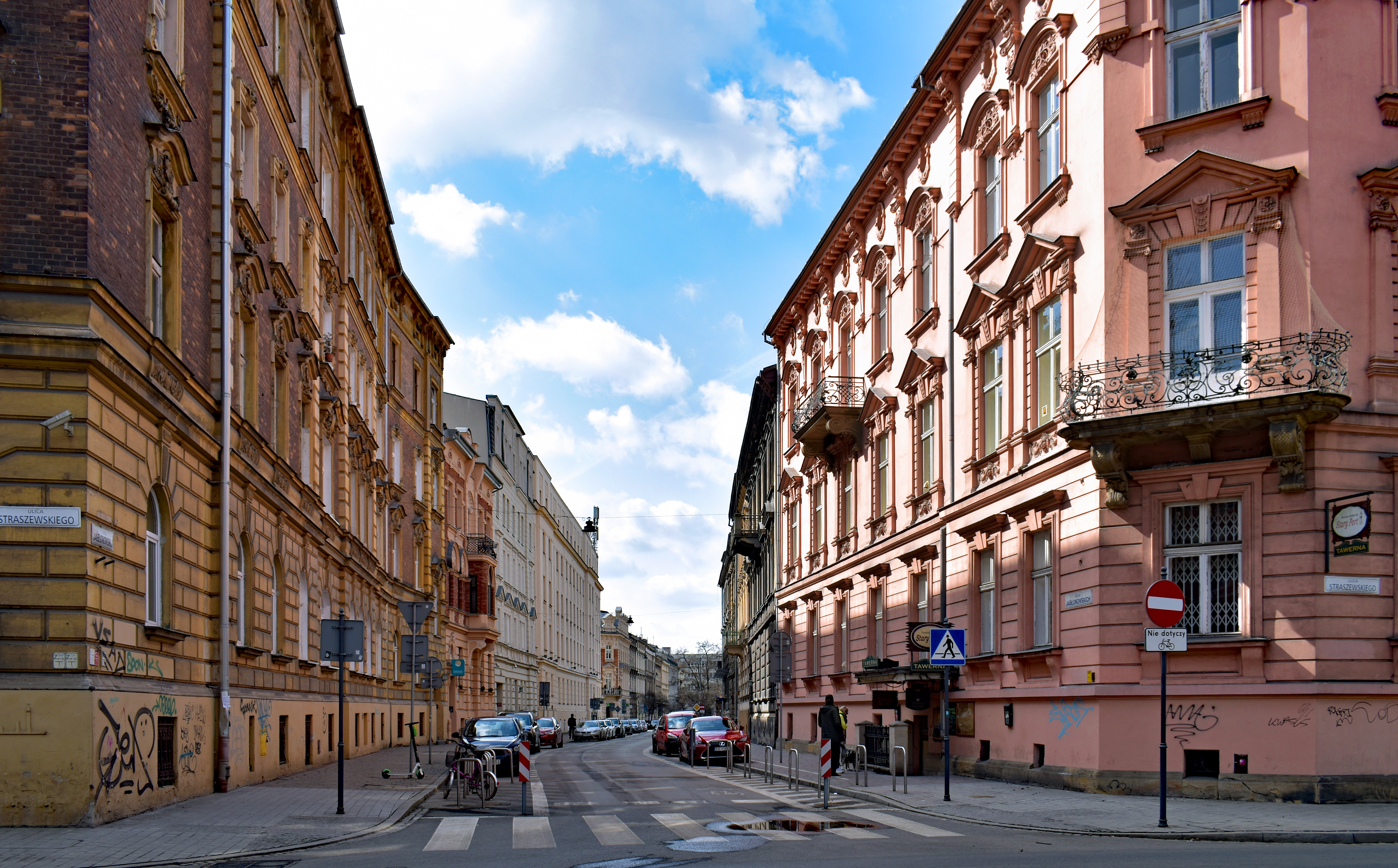
- Jabłonowskich Street view from Florian Straszewski Street (from Planty)
- Interactive map of Jabłonowskich street
- Part of: Kraków Old Town district
- Owner: City of Kraków
- Location: Kraków, Poland

Jabłonowskich Street is a street in Kraków, located in district Old Town in Nowy Świat. In the years 1952–1990, the street was named Stanisław Ziaja.

== History ==
A large area of land located to the west of the city walls belonged to the Jabłonowski family. When Kraków expanded significantly in this direction during the 1870s and 1880s, these lands were divided and designated for the construction of residential houses. The city quickly established a network of streets in this area. The current Jabłonowskich Street was laid out in the late 1880s. It was given its name in 1890. In 1952, the street's name was changed to Stanisława Ziai Street, in honor of a labor movement activist and member of the KPP and PPR who lived from 1903 to 1944. Stanisław Ziaja lived in the First Academic Dormitory located on Jabłonowskich Street in 1937. The original name was restored by the Kraków City Council in 1990.

== Buildings ==
- 3 Jabłonowskich Street – tenement house, designed by Józef Pokutyński, 1899.
- 5 Jabłonowskich Street – tenement house, designed by Beniamin Torbe, 1902–1903.
- 6 Jabłonowskich Street – tenement house, designed by Beniamin Torbe, 1900.
- 7 Jabłonowskich Street – tenement house, designed by Leopold Tlachna, 1902–1903.
- 8 Jabłonowskich Street – tenement house, designed by Aleksander Biborski, 1899–1900.
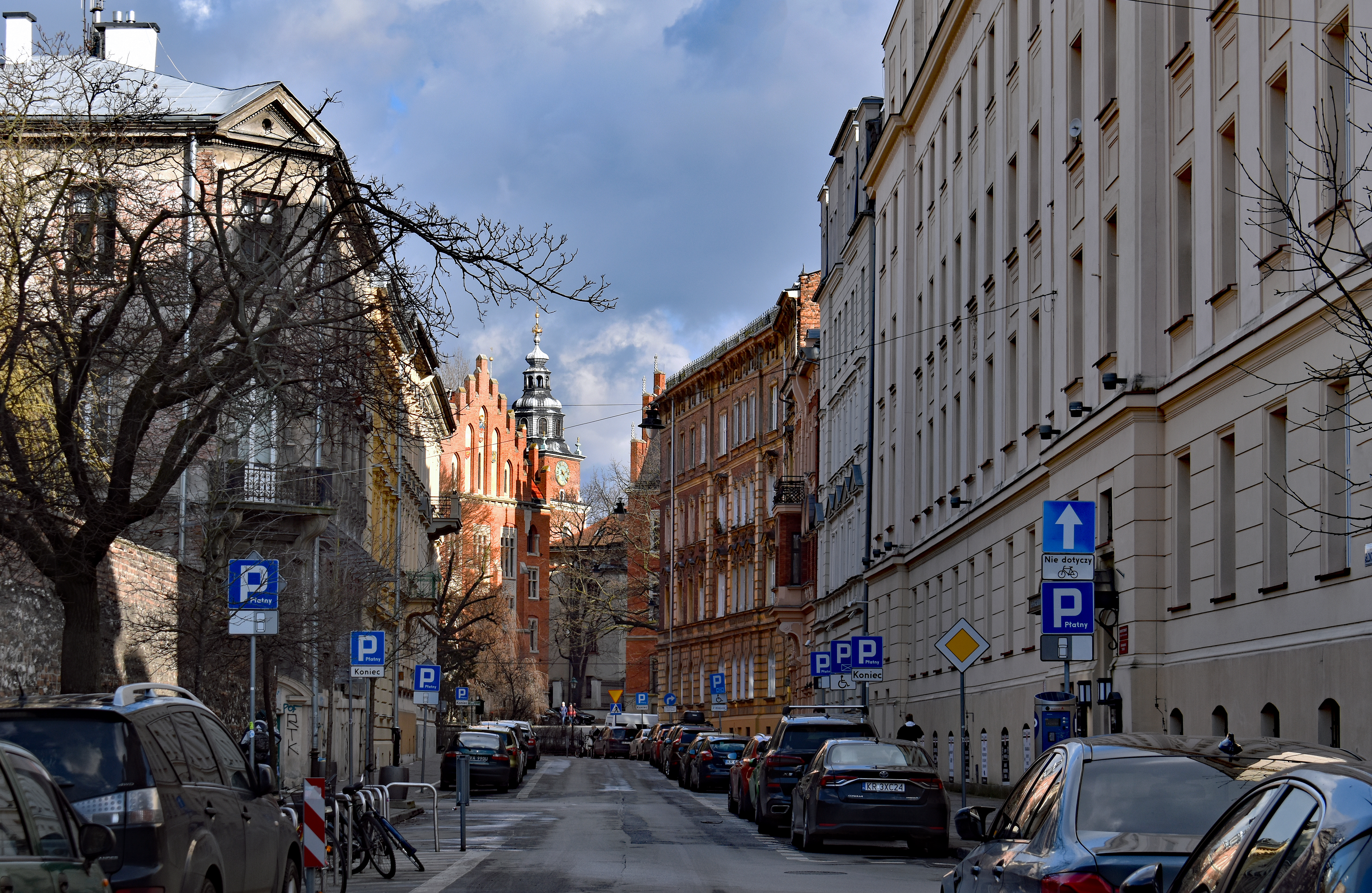
View to the east

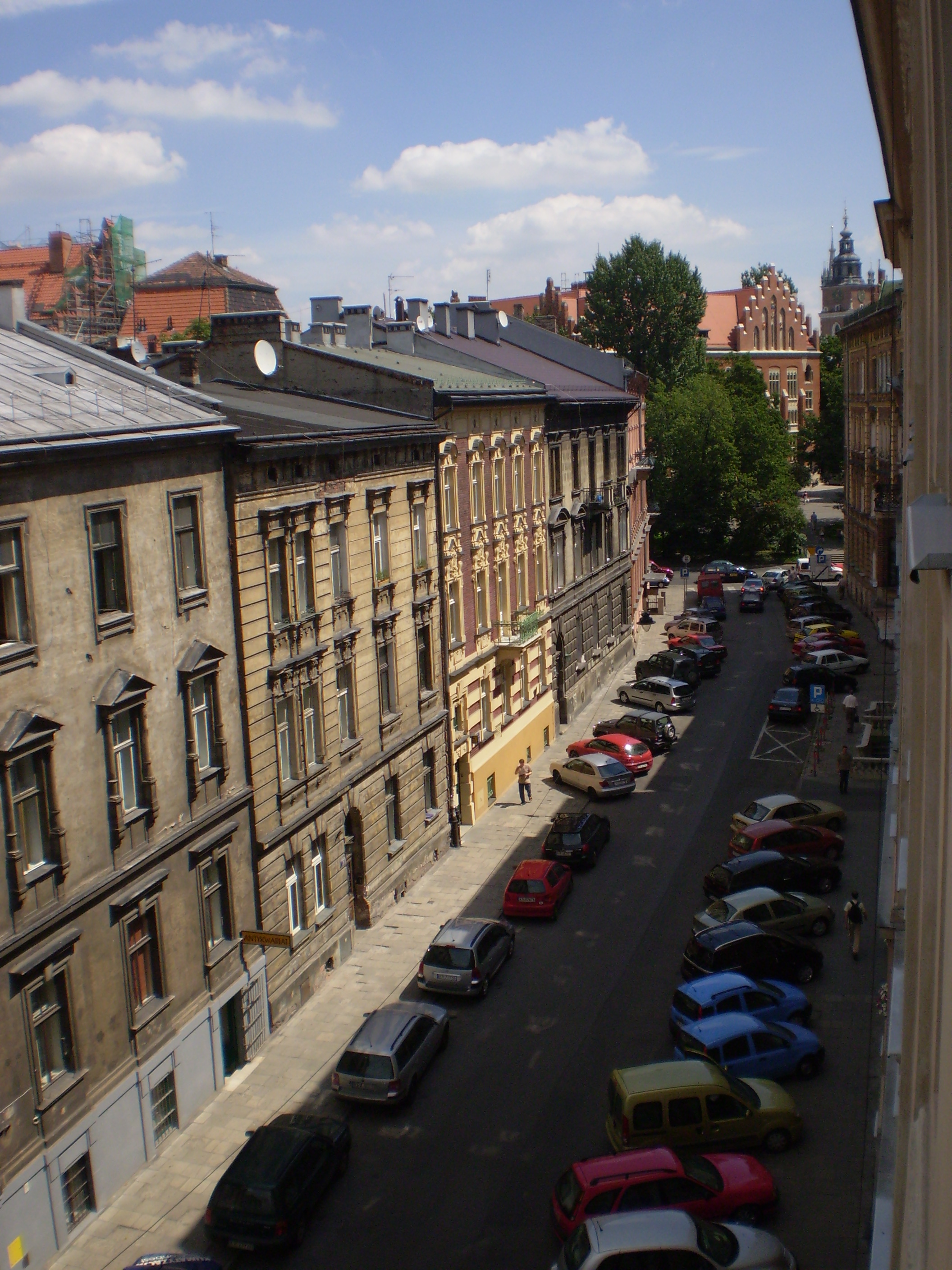
View from the windows of the "Bratniak" Academic House (2007)

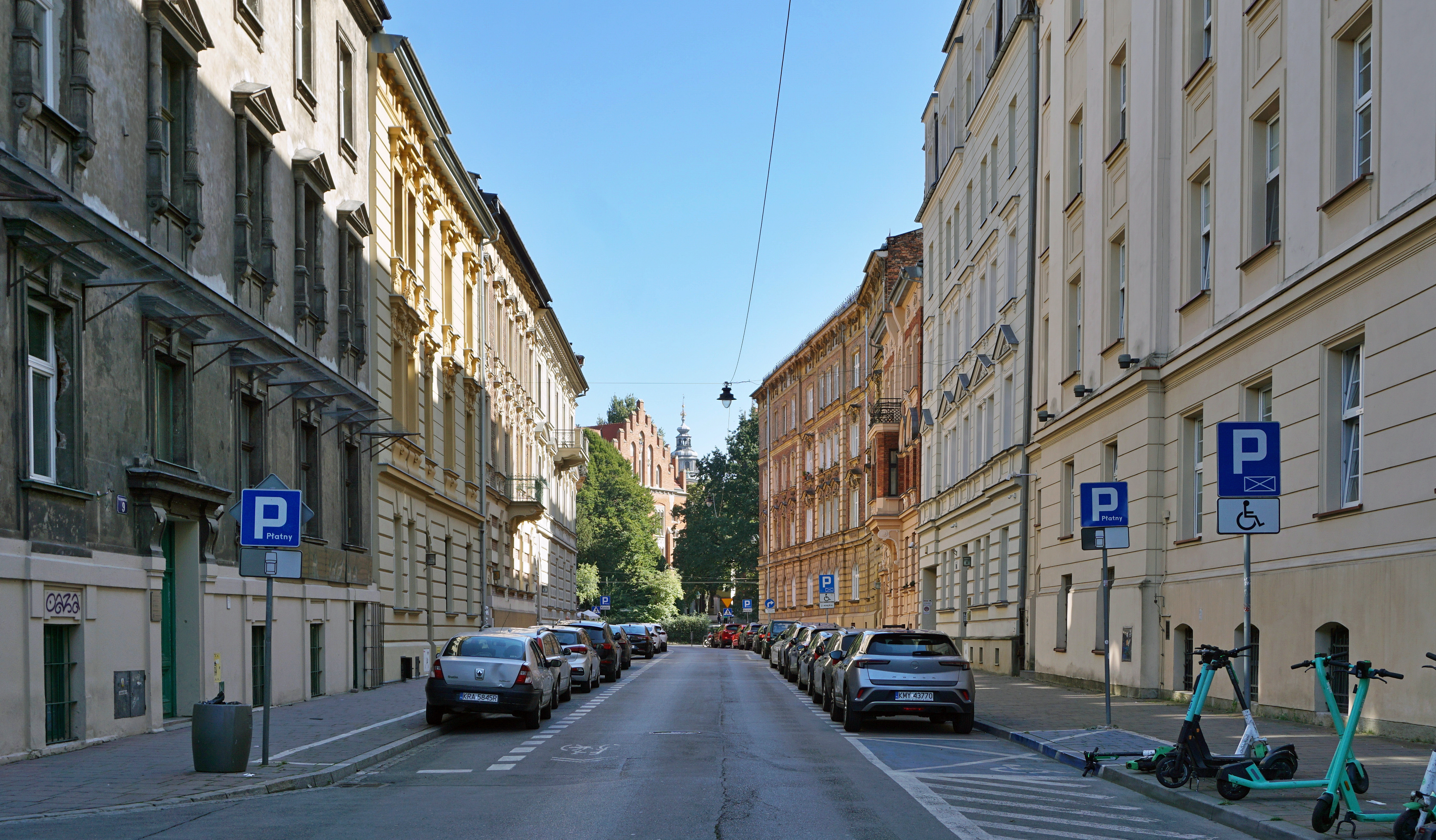
View to the east, at the intersection with Loretańska Street

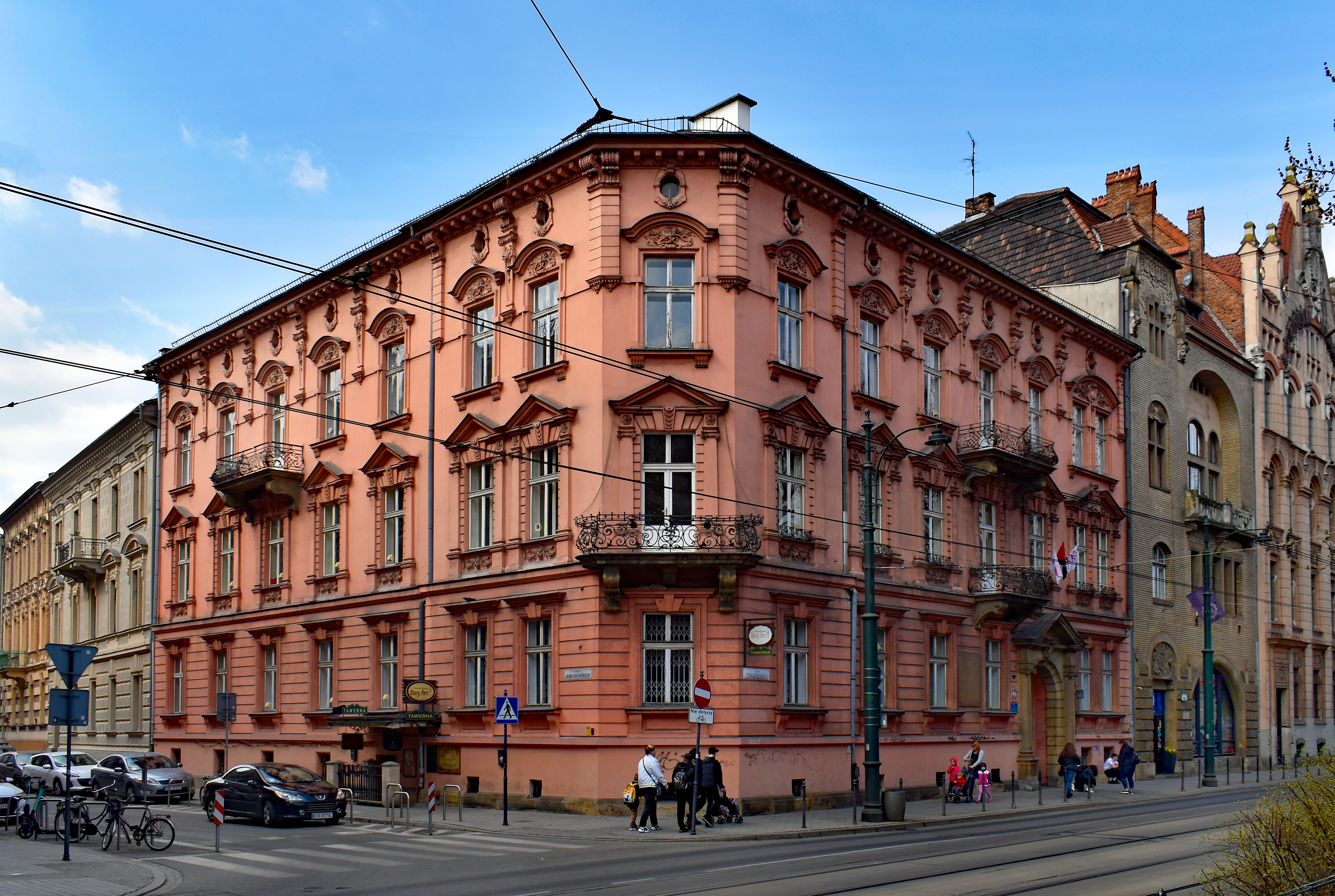
1 Jabłonowskich Street
The Hussarzewski House (design. Józef Pakies, 1897)

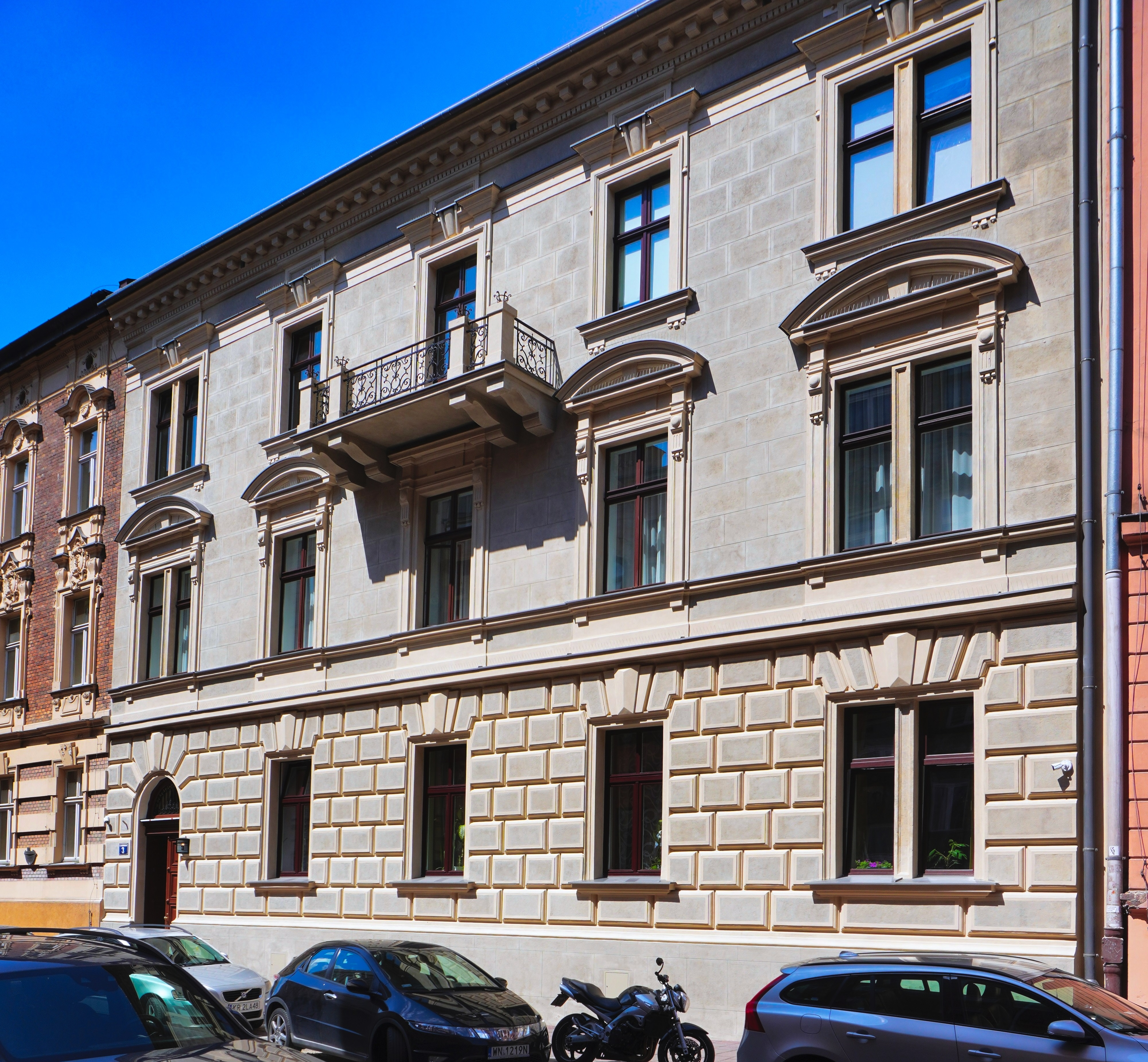
3 Jabłonowskich Street
Tenement house (design. Józef Pokutyński, 1899)

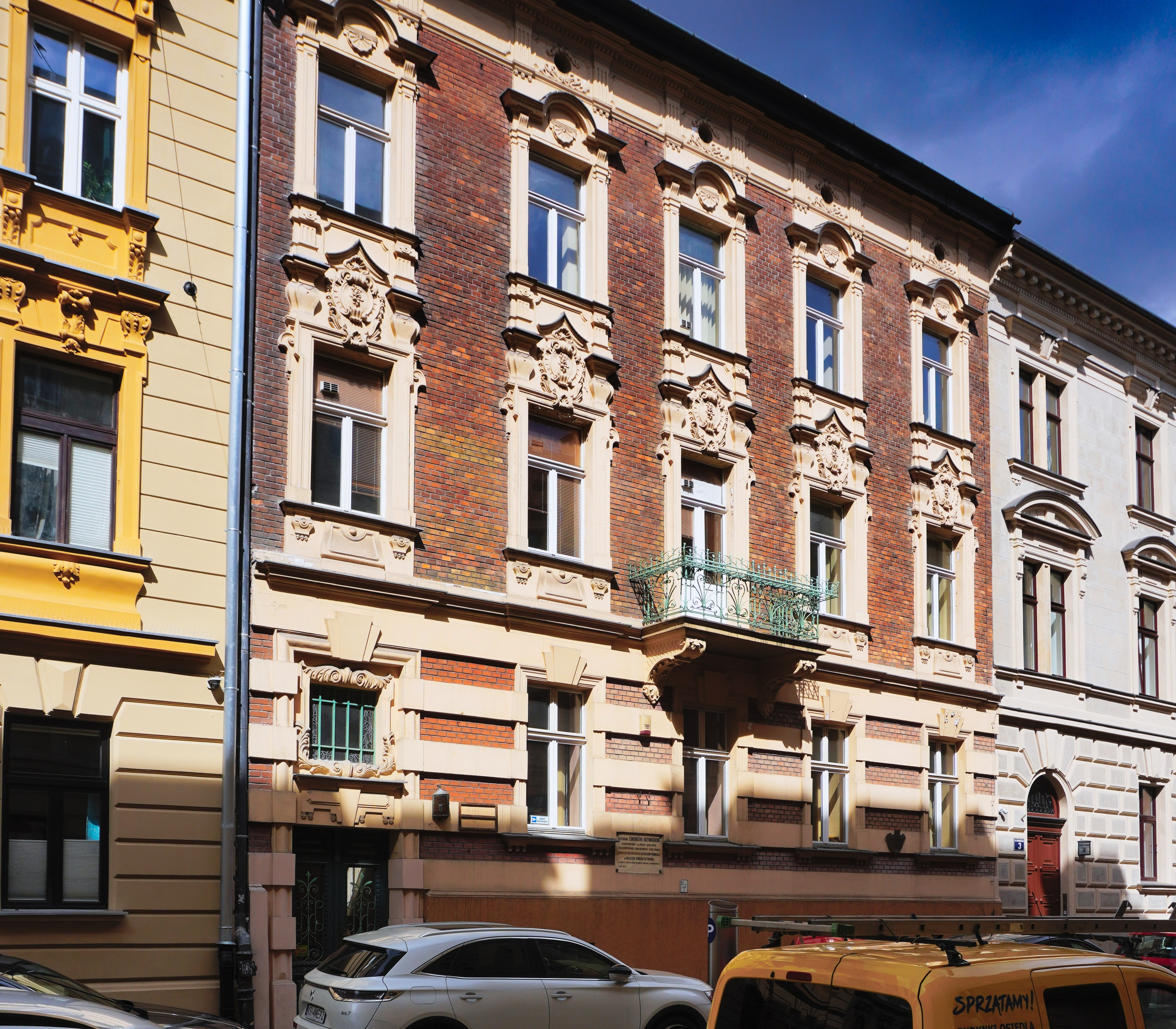
5 Jabłonowskich Street
Tenement house (design. Beniamin Torbe, 1902)

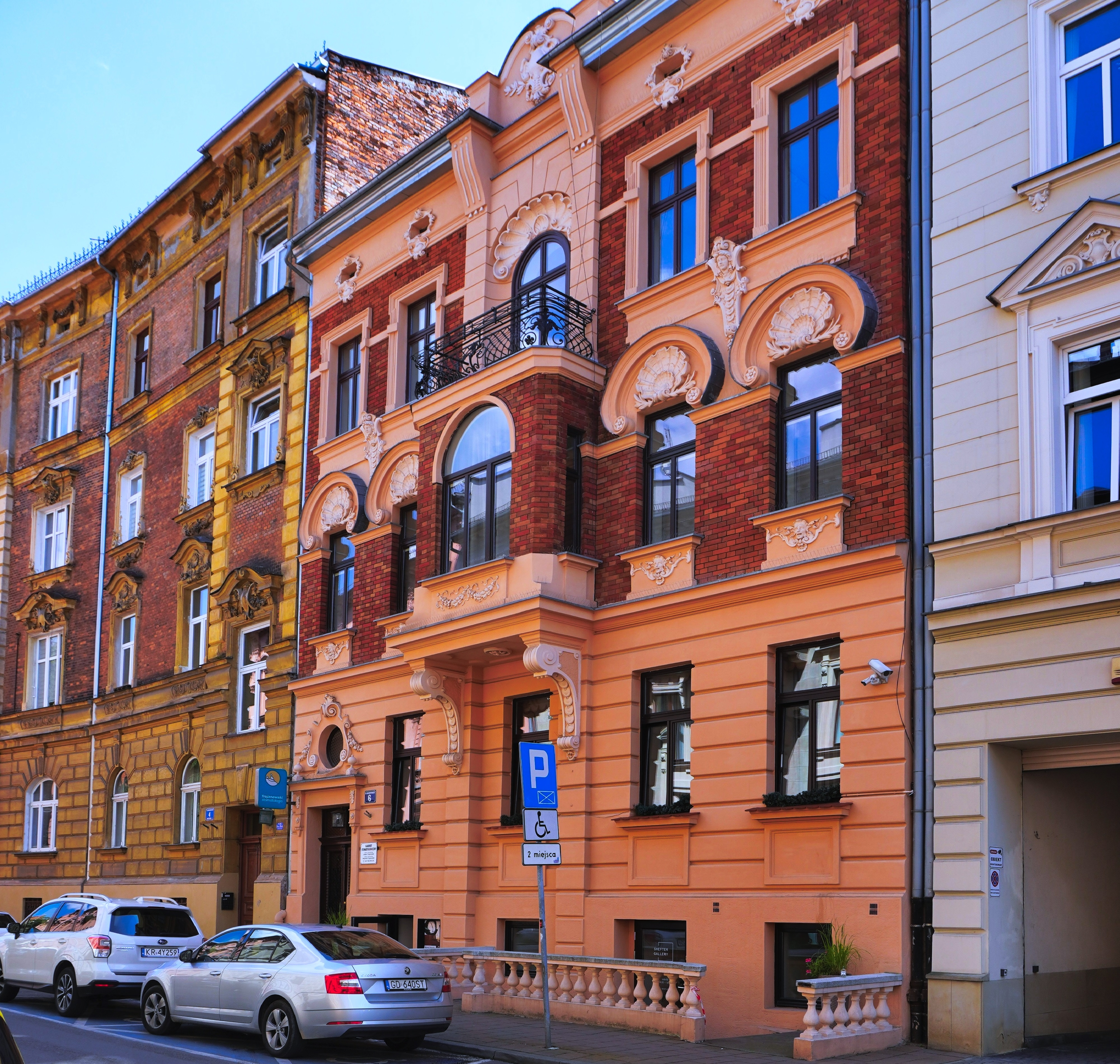
6 Jabłonowskich Street
Tenement house (design. Beniamin Torbe, 1900)

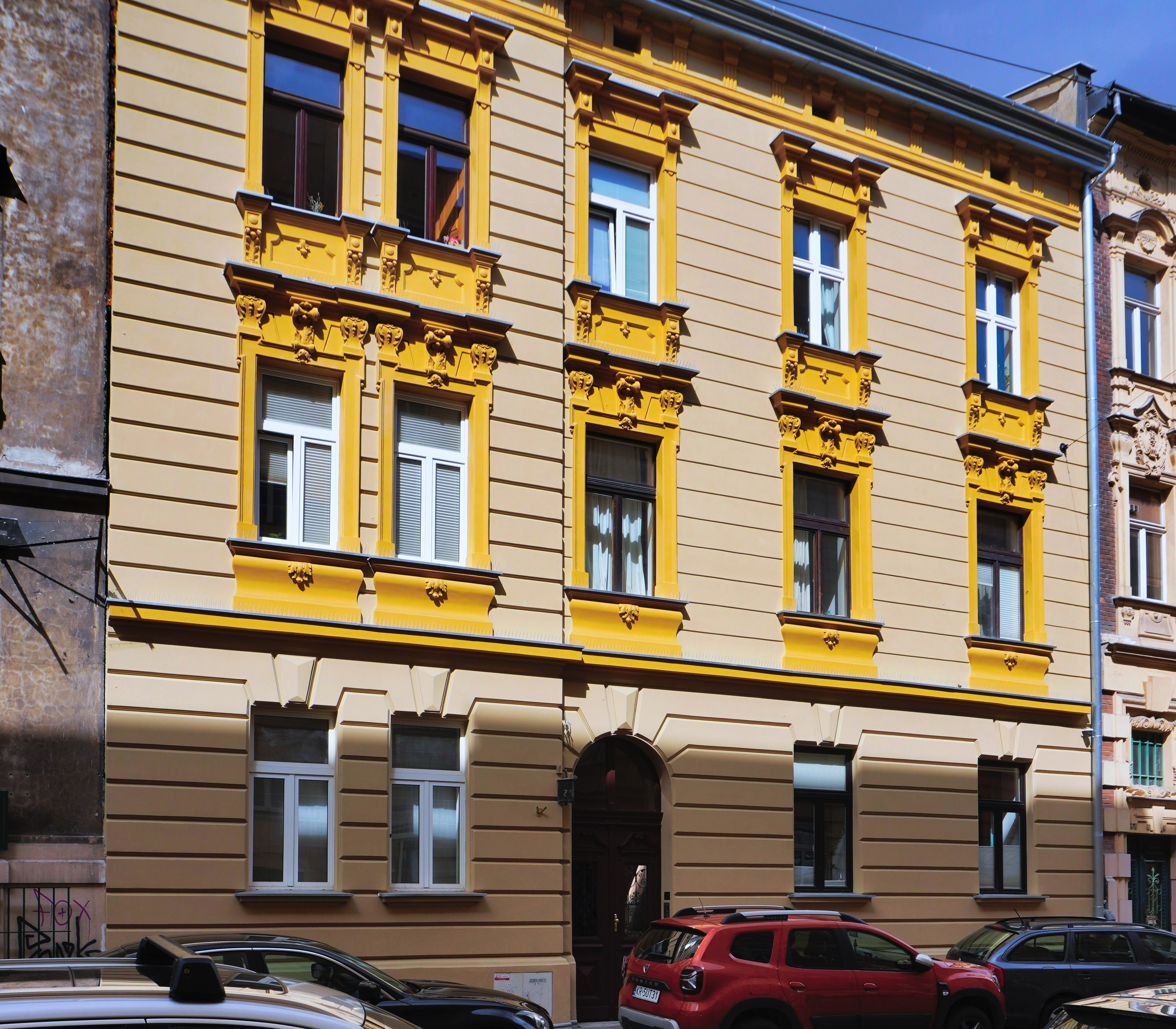
7 Jabłonowskich Street
Tenement house (design. Leopold Tlachna, 1902–1903)

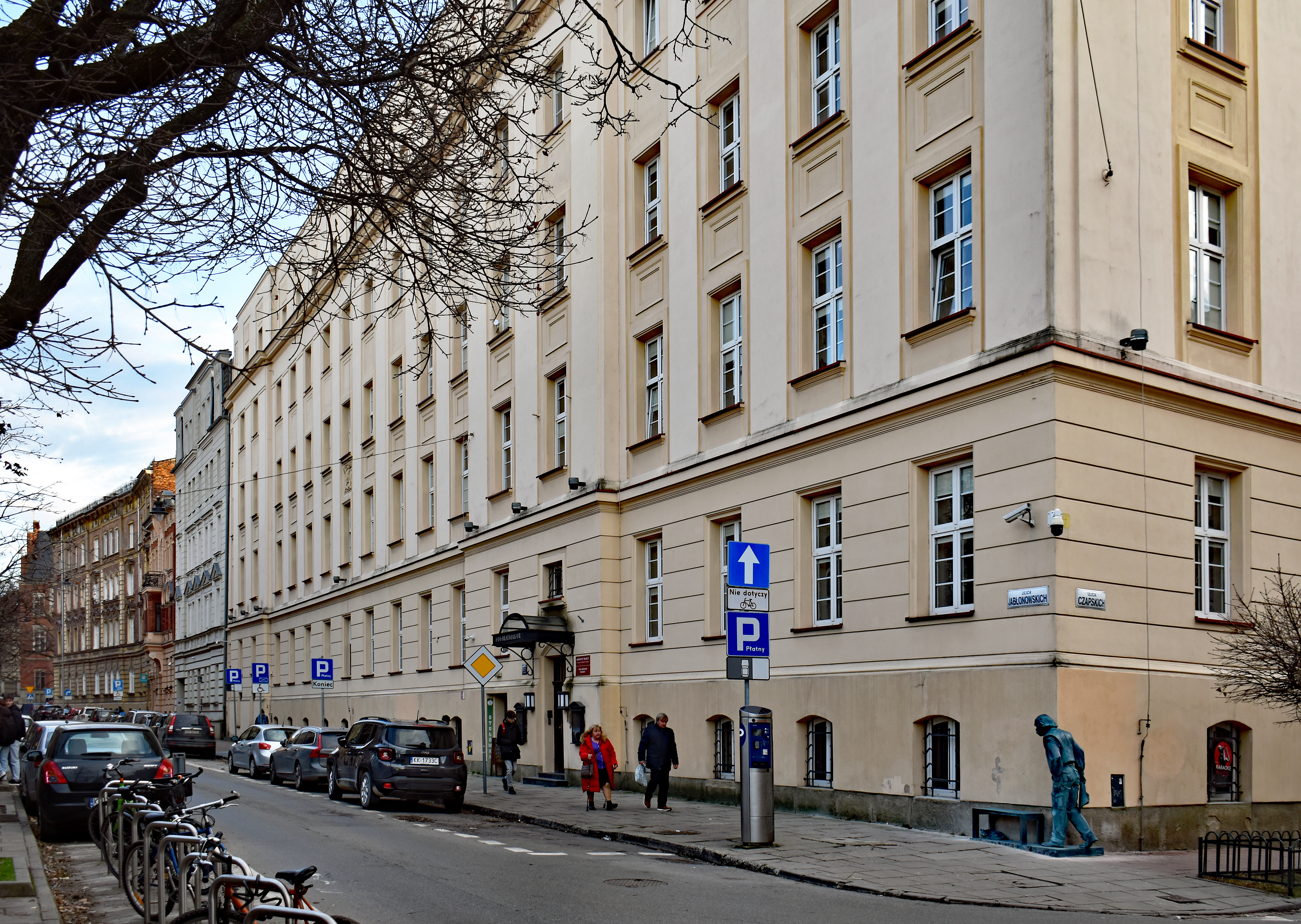
10-12 Jabłonowskich Street (2 Czapskich Street)
Academic House "Bratniak"

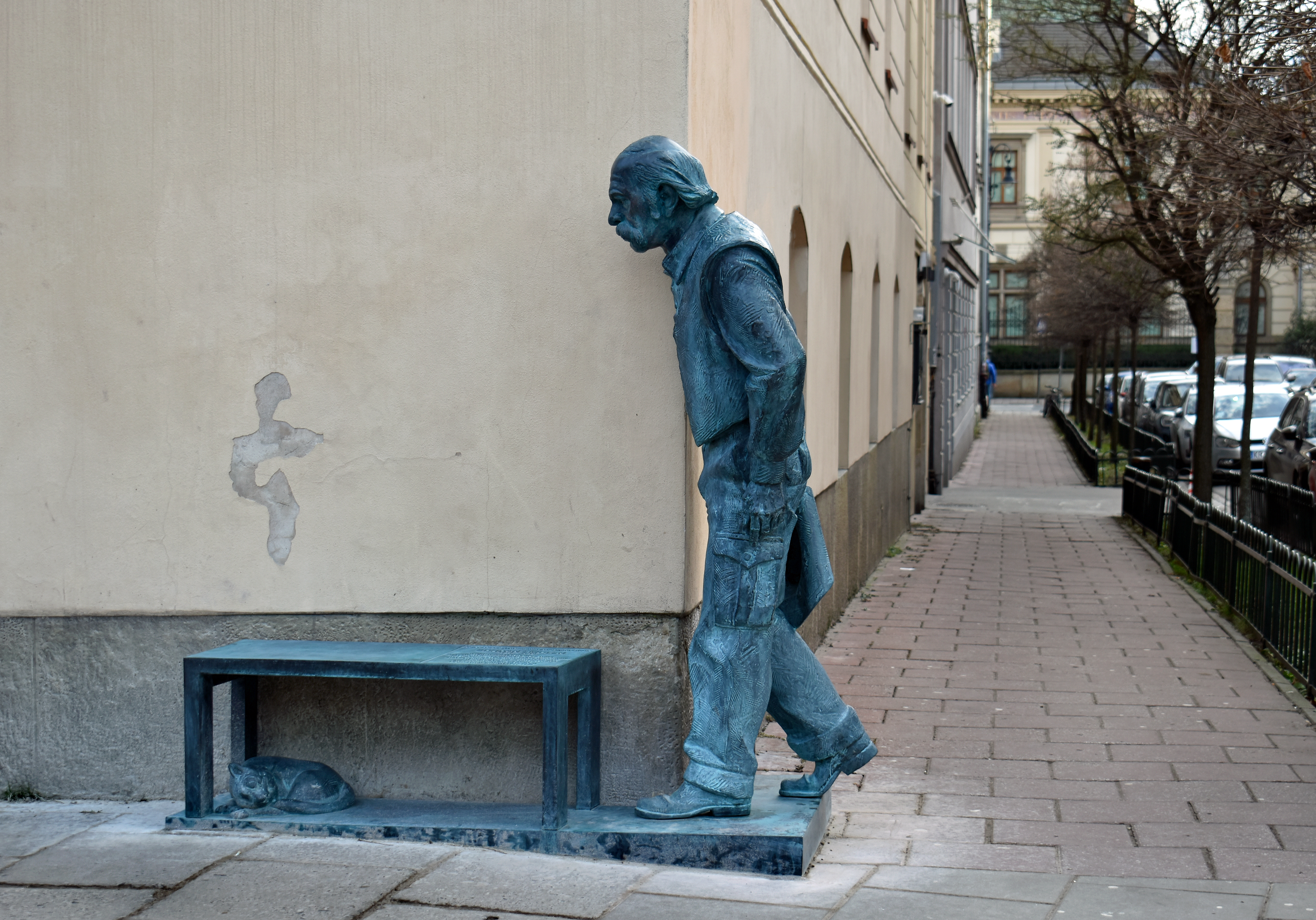
Monument to Bohdan Smoleń on the corner of Jabłonowskich and Czapskich streets
