= This Is Tomorrow =

Art exhibition in August 1956

This Is Tomorrow was an art exhibition in August 1956 at the Whitechapel Art Gallery on Whitechapel High Street in London's East End, UK, facilitated by curator Bryan Robertson. The core of the exhibition was the ICA Independent Group.

== History and philosophy ==
This is Tomorrow was a collaborative art exhibition that opened at the Whitechapel Art Gallery on 9 August 1956 and featured 12 exhibits within the show that featured collaborations between a variety of architects, painters, sculptors, and other artists. While each using their own style, they built pieces that represented their version of contemporary art. The result of the twelve groups was the attempt to evoke a variety of external environment through theories that were inspired by communications guru Marshall McLuhan, as well as symbols of pop culture. This is Tomorrow was nearly two years in the making, after architect and art critic Theo Crosby came up with the idea of mounting a large scale collaborative show at Whitechapel Gallery. By 1955 the participants were roughly divided into two camps; Constructivist, and the Independent Group, known for their meetings at the Institute of Contemporary Arts (ICA) in London with some overlap between the two groups. The 12 exhibits were each produced separately and were independent of each other. After This is Tomorrow opened nearly a thousand people a day saw the exhibit. The catalogue for the exhibit, designed by Independent member and graphic designer Edward Wright cost five shillings, a high price for 1956, sold out and had to be reprinted. This is Tomorrow is considered to be the forerunner of the British Pop Art movement.

Crosby writes on 8 June 1955 that the discussions... are really the point of the collaboration... the exhibition will not be a collection of miscellaneous art works. The This Is Tomorrow exhibition included artists, architects, musicians and graphic designers working together in 12 teams—referred to as "groups"—an example of multi-disciplinary collaboration that was still unusual. Each group took as their starting point the human senses and the theme of habitation. Each group worked independently but saw the final display as one environment. In highlights from a 1979 documentary by the architectural critic Reyner Banham, artists and architects who were involved recall the sense of excitement they felt over the collaborations; the constraints of cost—only £50 was assigned to each group for materials; and their sense of the importance of the show within the context of the establishment they opposed. This is Tomorrow is viewed as a groundbreaking exhibition because of the issues it addressed early that later became crucial in contemporary art, not simply the process of collaborative action, but the whole notion of creating an environment inside the art gallery. The ripples of influence it created 50 years ago are still being felt today.

As Banham stated in his documentary: This is modern art to entertain people, modern art as a game people will want to play. The sense of involvement and fun carries through in the press clippings; journalists were most taken by the fact that the show was opened by Robby the Robot, star of the sci-fi movie Forbidden Planet and easier to book than Marilyn Monroe.

== Group 2 ==
The exhibition's most remembered exhibit was the room created by Group 2, comprising Richard Hamilton, John Voelcker and John McHale, though with help from Magda Cordell and Frank Cordell. It included the Op Art dazzle panels, collage Space modules, and pop art readymade of a Marilyn Monroe poster, the Van Gogh Sunflowers poster, a film advertising billboard of the Forbidden Planet, Robby the Robot, a Jukebox, the strawberry perfumed carpet, an endless reel of film depicting the Royal Navy Fleet at sea, large Guinness beer bottles, a Marlon Brando poster image and a 'CinemaScope' collage mural design, and the design of the Pop art collage poster that were all provided by John McHale.

Frank Cordell assisted McHale with accessing the film posters such as Julius Caesar (1953) for the collage murals, the Forbidden Planet items, the juke box, and installing the film projector, and installing the Duchamp rotor discs given to McHale by Marcel Duchamp in New York. Frank Cordell also installed the electronic amplifier and microphone enabling the ambient sounds from audience cybernetic feedback. The Senses panel with arrows featuring Tito was a joint collaboration between Hamilton and McHale, and the version reproduced in the catalogue was slightly different in wording to alter the optical perception of viewers. Hamilton later produced a third version depicting the Senses panel in an interior collage depicting the TIT, but he changed the face to Pierre Mendès France, and changed the Guinness beer bottles and altered other visual details in the mural. McHale and Hamilton collaborated on the Spectrum diagram reproduced in the exhibition catalogue, and McHale later produced a modified version of this in his Man Plus section in his book on the Future of the Future.

The Pop art poster Just What Is It that Makes Today's Homes So Different, So Appealing?, was designed by Hamilton for Group 2. A second poster, comprising intersecting arrows and swirls was designed by McHale and taken to the silk screen stage by Hamilton. McHale also supplied a third separate designed poster to Hamilton with an arrow, containing the formula E=MC2 which was a Pop art '"mass" consumer' reference to the Albert Einstein famous mass-energy equivalence relativity formula. But Hamilton chose not to collaborate on the third poster, and expend the 'creative "energy"' to bring the E=MC2 to final completion at the TIT.

== Group 6 ==
Group Six was composed of architects Alison and Peter Smithson and artists Eduardo Paolozzi and Nigel Henderson. The resulting work, "Patio and Pavilion", was a three walled structure with a corrugated plastic roof and surrounded by a sand patio. Found objects such as bike parts, a battered bugle and a clock without hands were strewn throughout the installation. In a country still recovering from war, the spare architecture offered an exploration of the fractured, but enduring presence of quotidian life during conflict.

== Catalogue and guides ==
The exhibition catalogue featured essays by Reyner Banham and Lawrence Alloway. McHale wrote the text for the page Are they Cultured? and it was intended to be featured with the McHale-designed collage that got mispaginated in the catalogue.

Colin St John Wilson designed the exhibition guide. The graphic designer Edward Wright (1912–88), who taught typography at the Central School of Art from 1950 to 1955 and then the Royal College of Art, designed the catalogue for This Is Tomorrow. Theo Crosby found the money for it, and it was printed by Lund Humphries. The director of Lund Humphries, Peter Gregory along with Peter Watson were among the original founding patrons of the ICA.

== Legacy ==
This is Tomorrow is now considered a watershed in post-war British Art and in some respects kick started the development of the British arm of Pop Art. The 1977 song "This is Tomorrow" from In Your Mind by Bryan Ferry, a student of Richard Hamilton's, took its title from the name of the show.

Parts of This Is Tomorrow were recreated in 1990 for an exhibition at the Institute of Contemporary Arts.

== Artist teams in exhibition ==
- Group One: Theo Crosby, Germano Facetti, William Turnbull, Edward Wright
- Group Two: Richard Hamilton, John McHale, John Voelcker
- Group Three: J. D. H. Catleugh, James Hull, Leslie Thornton
- Group Four: Anthony Jackson, Sarah Jackson, Emilio Scanavino
- Group Five: John Ernest, Anthony Hill, Denis Williams, Colin Glennie
- Group Six: Eduardo Paolozzi, Alison and Peter Smithson, Nigel Henderson
- Group Seven: Victor Pasmore, Ernő Goldfinger, Helen Phillips
- Group Eight: James Stirling, Michael Pine (CMHC Ottawa architect), Richard Matthews
- Group Nine: Kenneth Martin, Mary Martin and John Weeks
- Group Ten: Robert Adams, Frank Newby, Peter Carter, Colin St. John Wilson
- Group Eleven: Adrian Heath, John Weeks
- Group Twelve: Lawrence Alloway, Geoffrey Holroyd, Toni del Renzio

== Bibliography ==
- Banham, Reyner. "This Is Tomorrow." October no. 136 (Spring 2011): 32-34.
- Godfrey, Tony. "Days Like These; This Was Tomorrow." Burlington Magazine 145, (May 2003): 381-383.
- Grieve, Alastair. "This Is Tomorrow, A Remarkable Exhibition Born From Contention." Burlington Magazine 136, (April 1994): 225-232.
- Highmore, Ben. "Rough Poetry: ‘Patio and Pavilion’ Revisited." Oxford Art Journal 29, no. 2 (June 2006): 269-290.
- Jobse, Jonneke. "De Stijl Continued: The Journal Structure (1958-1964) an Artists' Debate", 010 Uitgeverij; 01 edition (Sept. 2005): 323-324.
