= Lawrence Alloway =

English art critic and curator

- Born: 17 September 1926; Wimbledon, London, United Kingdom
- Died: 2 January 1990 (aged 63); New York City, New York, United States
- Occupations: Art critic Curator
- Spouse: Sylvia Sleigh (m. 1954)

Lawrence Reginald Alloway (17 September 1926 – 2 January 1990) was an English art critic and curator who worked in the United States from 1961. In the 1950s, he was a leading member of the Independent Group in the UK and in the 1960s was an influential writer and curator in the US. He first used the term "mass popular art" in the mid-1950s and used the term "Pop Art" in the 1960s to indicate that art has a basis in the popular culture of its day and takes from it a faith in the power of images. From 1954 until his death in 1990, he was married to the painter Sylvia Sleigh.

== Early life and education ==
Between 1943 and 1947, Alloway studied art history at the University of London, where he met the future critic and curator David Sylvester. Alloway wrote short book reviews for the London Times in 1944 and 1945, at which time he was between 17 and 19 years old.

== Work ==
=== Early career and the Independent Group ===
Alloway started writing reviews for the British periodical Art News and Review (later renamed ArtReview) in 1949 and for the American periodical Art News in 1953. In Nine Abstract Artists (1954) he promoted the Constructivist artists that emerged in Britain after the Second World War: Robert Adams, Terry Frost, Adrian Heath, Anthony Hill, Roger Hilton, Kenneth Martin, Mary Martin, Victor Pasmore, and William Scott.

Alloway's theory of art reflecting the concrete materials of modern life gave way to an interest in mass-media and consumerism. Alloway joined the Independent Group in 1952 and lectured on his theory of a circular link between popular cultural "low art" and "high art". From 1955 to 1960 he was assistant director of the Institute of Contemporary Arts in London. He organised the exhibition Collages and Objects (1954). In 1956 Alloway contributed to organising the exhibition This Is Tomorrow. When reviewing that show and other works he had seen on a trip to the US in a 1958 article, he first used the term "mass popular art".

=== Career in the US ===
In 1961, through his contacts with the American painter Barnett Newman, Alloway was offered a lecturer position at Bennington College in Vermont. He and his wife, the realist painter Sylvia Sleigh, lived in Bennington for only one year before Alloway was appointed curator at the Solomon R. Guggenheim Museum in New York City, a position he held until 1966. In 1963 he organised the pop art show, Six Painters and the Object. He chaired the jury of the 1964 Guggenheim Awards, one of which was refused by the painter Asger Jorn.

In 1966, Alloway curated the influential Systemic Painting exhibition that showcased geometric abstraction in American art via Minimal art, Shaped canvas, and Hard-edge painting. He coined the term Systemic Art to "describe a type of abstract art characterized by the use of very simple standardized forms, usually geometric in character, either in a single concentrated image or repeated in a system arranged according to a clearly visible principle of organization". Alloway was also an ardent supporter of Abstract expressionism and American Pop artists, such as Roy Lichtenstein, Claes Oldenburg, and Andy Warhol. He resigned from the Guggenheim after Thomas M. Messer, the museum's director, overruled Alloway's selections—consisting mostly of sculptures—for the upcoming Venice Biennale.

In 1966–67, Alloway was appointed visiting professor at the School of Fine Arts at Southern Illinois University Carbondale, where John McHale and Buckminster Fuller were also on staff.

In the 1970s, Alloway wrote for The Nation and Artforum, and lectured at the State University of New York, Stony Brook where he was appointed professor of art history. There he co-founded the magazine Art Criticism with the critic Donald Kuspit. With the rise of the feminist art movement, Alloway championed the work of women; he noted, for example, "a 3-to-1 advantage" of men over women in the Whitney Annual in 1977.

=== Origins of the term Pop Art ===
Concerning the origins of the term Pop Art, Alloway said, "The term, originated in England by me, as a description of mass communications, especially, but not exclusively, visual ones." In a footnote to his essay Pop Art the words, he also states, "The first published appearance of the terms that I know is: Lawrence Alloway, 'The Arts and the Mass Media,' Architectural Design, February 1958, London. Ideas on Pop Art were discussed by Reyner Banham, Theo Crosby, Frank Cordell, Toni del Renzio, Richard Hamilton, Nigel Henderson, John McHale, Eduardo Paolozzi, Alison and Peter Smithson, sculptor William Turnbull, and myself."

However, there are contradictory recollections as to the origin of the term: according to John McHale's son his father first coined the term in 1954 in conversation with Frank Cordell, and the term was then used in Independent Group discussions by mid 1955. Alloway used the term 'mass popular art' in his oft quoted 1958 article but he did not use the specific term "Pop Art" in the piece.

== Death ==
Alloway suffered from a neurological disorder and died of cardiac arrest on 2 January 1990, aged 63.
