= John F. C. Turner =

British architect (1927–2023)

- Born: John Francis Charlewood Turner; 9 July 1927; Kensington, London, England
- Died: 3 September 2023 (aged 96); Hastings, England
- Occupations: Architect; Academic
- Spouses: Catherine Wilson (m. 1950, divorced) Bertha Berry (m. 1971)
- Relatives: Arthur Gaskin (grandfather); Georgie Gaskin (grandmother); Mary Anne Kunkel (sister)
- Awards: Right Livelihoods Award (1988); UN-Habitat Scroll of Honour Award (1992)

Academic background
- Education: St Edmund's School, Hindhead, Surrey; Wellington College, Berkshire; Architectural Association School of Architecture

Academic work
- Institutions: Development Planning Unit, University College London; Harvard–MIT Joint Center for Urban Studies; Architectural Association School of Architecture
- Notable works: Housing By People: Towards Autonomy in Building Environments (1976)

John Francis Charlewood Turner (9 July 1927 – 3 September 2023) was a British architect and theorist known for his work on informal self-help housing and neighbourhood building in Peru, the United States, and the United Kingdom. His work on housing in the 1960s and 1970s has seen him described as the most influential post-war writer on housing in the developing world and as a "principal architect" in United Nations and World Bank policies on self-help urban assistance to developing countries. He was awarded the Right Livelihood Award in 1988 for "championing the rights of people to build, manage and sustain their own shelter and communities".

== Early influences ==
Turner was born in Kensington, London, to Joscelyne Gaskin and Austin Charlewood Turner, and was raised in Kent. His maternal grandparents were the artists Georgie and Arthur Gaskin. Turner attended St Edmund's School in Surrey and Wellington College in Berkshire. He enrolled at the Architectural Association School of Architecture (the AA) in London in 1944, but his studies were interrupted with two years of national service and a year working for BBPR in Milan, Italy. During national service he found a copy of the anarchist newspaper Freedom in his barracks and began reading anarchist literature including Peter Kropotkin and Herbert Read. Following his return to studies he was influenced by the ideas of Patrick Geddes and Lewis Mumford through his lecturer Jaqueline Tyrwhitt, which he explored and published with fellow students Paffard Keatinge-Clay and Bruce Martin. At this time he also contributed to Freedom on the encouragement of editor Colin Ward, drawing connections between Geddes and anarchism. In later life Turner described himself as a "moderate anarchist", while he has cited the influence of Geddes on him throughout his career, including the use and adaptation of various Geddesian diagrams. He has also cited William Morris as an early influence. At this time he also collaborated with fellow students John Voelcker and Andrew Derbyshire. Turner graduated from the AA in 1954.

== Peru ==
From 1957 to 1965 Turner worked in Peru as an architect in international and state housing agencies in Arequipa and then Lima. He was invited to work in Peru by the likeminded Peruvian architect and planner Eduardo Neira, Turner took up the offer in part because he saw little opportunity to put his ideas into practice within the UK.

At the time there was significant migration within Peru from rural areas into the rapidly growing cities, contributing to significant housing shortages, overcrowding, and substandard housing. On the outskirts of cities informal squatter settlements, or barriadas, were forming as people claimed land and began constructing basic homes. Neira, as the head of the urban planning department of the Ministry of Development and Public Works, had been working on a change in policy for Arequipa to shift the role of the state to facilitating a number of barriadas by granting rights to settlers, providing basic services (water and sewerage), and providing some technical assistance in construction.

While progress had been made in enacting Neira's recommendations, they faced significant local political disputes. In 1957 Turner was brought in to lead the Arequipa branch (the IUP, later OATA) of the Ministry responsible for the project. He worked to survey the settlements, negotiate with settlers, improve existing settlements, and develop a system of standardised construction components and methods for settlers to use. He based the surveys on Geddes' own "civic surveys", while improvements made to existing settlements followed Geddes' "conservative surgery" model. However, Turner grew pessimistic about progress.

In January 1958 an earthquake hit Arequipa destroying 1,647 dwellings and killing 28 people. As part of the aid relief Turner was joined by his AA friend and fellow anarchist Patrick Crooke.

In 1963 the Chilean-born architect and journal editor Monica Pidgeon invited Turner to edit an issue of Architectural Design on his and others work in Peru.

== United States ==
In 1965 Turner moved to Cambridge, Massachusetts, USA where he began working as a research assistant at the Harvard–MIT Joint Center for Urban Studies, and then as a lecturer at MIT's Department of Urban Studies and Planning until 1973. Much of his key academic writings date from this period.

In 1970–1971 Turner led an evaluation of self-help housing in the USA carried out by OSTI (Organization for Technical and Social Innovation) under Donald Schön, for the U.S. Department of Housing and Urban Development. This work formed the basis of the 1972 book Freedom to Build: Dweller Control of the Housing Process which he co-edited with Robert Fichter. In the preface Fichter describes the book as "part of a breaking wave of reaction against authoritarian solutions to technocratically posed problems".

== Britain ==
In 1973 he returned to London and began lecturing at the Architectural Association and then at the Development Planning Unit, University College London until 1983. In 1976 his book Housing By People: Towards Autonomy in Building Environments was published exploring alternate models of housing.

In 1988 he was awarded the Right Livelihood Award for "championing the rights of people to build, manage and sustain their own shelter and communities". In 1992 he was awarded the UN-Habitat Scroll of Honour Award. Turner was awarded honorary doctorates from the National University of Engineering in Lima and the National University of the Center of Peru in Huancayo.

John F. C. Turner died in Hastings, England on 3 September 2023, at the age of 96. His archives are held by the Centre Obert d'Arquitectura in Barcelona.

== Bibliography ==
- Turner, John Charlewood, ed. (August 1963). "8. Dwelling Resources in South America". Architectural Design. 33 (8). London: Standard Catalogue Company: 359–393. ISSN 0003-8504.
- A Roof of my Own (Television). United Nations. 1964.
- Turner, John C. (November 1968). "Housing Priorities, Settlement Patterns, and Urban Development in Modernizing Countries". Journal of the American Institute of Planners. 34 (6): 354–363. doi:10.1080/01944366808977562.
- Caminos, Horacio; Turner, John F. C.; Steffian, John A. (1969). Urban Dwelling Environments: An Elementary Survey of Settlements for the Study of Design Determinants. Cambridge, MA: MIT Press. ISBN 978-0-26-203028-1. OCLC 815265389.
- Fichter, Robert; Turner, John F. C., eds. (1972). Freedom to Build: Dweller Control of the Housing Process. Macmillan. ISBN 978-0-02-089690-6. OCLC 760537275.
- Turner, John F. C. (1976). Housing By People: Towards Autonomy in Building Environments. London: Marion Boyars. ISBN 0-7145-2568-5. OCLC 2394859.
- Turner, John F. C. (2018). Autoconstrucción: Por una autonomía del habitar: Escritos sobre urbanismo, vivienda, autogestión y holismo (in Spanish). Translated by Golda-Pongratz, Kathrin; Bañales, José Luis Oyón; Zimmermann, Volker. Logroño: Pepitas de Calabaza. ISBN 978-84-15862-79-6. OCLC 1117402960.
