= Catleugh =

Catleugh is a surname. Notable people with the surname include:

- George Catleugh (1932–1996), British footballer
- J. D. H. Catleugh (1920–2009), British abstract artist
