= Theo Crosby =

South African architect (1925–1994)

- Crosby in 1965
- Born: April 3, 1925; South Africa
- Died: September 12, 1994 (aged 69)
- Occupation: Architect

Theo Crosby RA (3 April 1925 – 12 September 1994) was an architect, editor, writer and sculptor, engaged with major developments in design across four decades. He was also an early vocal critic of modern urbanism. He is best remembered as a founding partner of the international design partnership Pentagram, and as architect for the reconstruction of Shakespeare's Globe in London. However, his role as éminence grise in British architecture and design from 1950 to 1990 helped effect much broader changes. Crosby's archive is located at the University of Brighton Design Archives.

== 1940s and 1950s: architecture and sculpture ==
Crosby studied architecture under Rex Martienssen, an acolyte of Le Corbusier, at Witwatersrand University Johannesburg. From 1944 he participated in the Allied invasion of Italy. His post-VE day travels around that country introduced him to a world—of urbanity and cultural generosity—which he had never experienced in South Africa, and which opened his eyes to the power of the public realm. He settled in England in 1948, following the South African government's official sanctioning of apartheid. In 1949 he began work at the modernist architectural practice of Fry, Drew and Partners on Gloucester Place in London, combining this with studying sculpture in the evenings at the Central School of Arts and Crafts. Here he came into contact with teachers Richard Hamilton, Eduardo Paolozzi and Edward Wright, with whom he would later work on the exhibition This is Tomorrow, and fellow students Alan Fletcher and Colin Forbes, with whom he would later form a design partnership. The Central, with its emphasis on cross-disciplinary work, would have a lasting effect on Crosby's view of the architect's role. He also formed links at this time with the modernist MARS Group, and the Architectural Association.

== 1950s and 1960s: editing and exhibitions ==
Between 1953 and 1962, while establishing his own architectural practice, Crosby acted as Technical Editor (under Monica Pidgeon's editorship) of Architectural Design magazine, which was seeking to bring a more youthful, vital and progressive approach to the subject than the previously dominant Architectural Review. At first his main job was laying out the pages, for which he sought guidance from the Central School, but was "rebuffed". It was left to the painter Edward Wright to provide him with some instruction a couple of years later. He also "designed beautiful abstract covers, sometimes including the odd word to describe the theme du jour – "houses", "roofs", "Sheffield" – but rarely featuring photography or even buildings". During his tenure the early works of James Stirling, Norman Foster and Richard Rogers were published in AD, and it began to champion what came to be known as the "zoom wave".

Attaching himself to the Institute of Contemporary Arts (ICA) in London, Crosby attended meetings of the Independent Group there, and was particularly impressed by the group's discussions of the impact of mass communication and information theory on architecture and design. It was Crosby who suggested, and steered to completion, what would be the Independent Group's swansong—the watershed exhibition This Is Tomorrow at London's Whitechapel Gallery in 1956. Characteristically the exhibition was organised around twelve multidisciplinary teams. Crosby collaborated on his installation with graphic designers Germano Facetti and Edward Wright, and the sculptor William Turnbull. The installations which garnered most attention, however, were those of Richard Hamilton, John McHale and John Voelcker (with its Pop-Art imagery including Robby the Robot), and Eduardo Paolozzi, Alison and Peter Smithson and Nigel Henderson (which featured a "primitive" pavilion studded with evocative ephemera). In AD Crosby wrote that the exhibition was "evidence of attempts towards a new sort of order, a way towards that integration of the arts that must come if our culture is not merely to survive, but come truly to life". It was, he said later, "my first experience at a loose, horizontal organisation of equals", and claimed it was the inspiration behind the distinctive organisation of Pentagram. In characteristic fashion, Crosby—alert to practicalities—sold the ads that made the memorable exhibition catalogue possible. In 1960 he showed his own sculpture at the ICA, alongside paintings by Peter Blake and interventions by John Latham.

Between 1958 and 1960 five issues of the "little" arts magazine Uppercase were published, with Crosby as editor.

Crosby also edited the ICA's Living Arts magazine, and persuaded the institute to mount an exhibition—Living Cities—in 1963, to foreground the urban theories of the young Archigram group. He also found the money for the show (from the Gulbenkian Foundation), and featured it in a special edition of Living Arts Crosby has been described as a "hidden hand" during this period, uniting the separate spheres of Archigram, the Architectural Association, and Architectural Design, and thereby "creating a new circuit for progressive and 'international' notions".

UIA Congress and Exhibition buildings on London's South Bank, 1961.

The late 1950s and early 1960s saw Crosby add to his reputation as an architect through a number of temporary exhibitions. With Edward Wright he produced the Architectural Design magazine's stands at the 1955 and 1958 Building Exhibitions, and the congress and exhibition buildings for the 6th International Union of Architects Congress, held in London in 1961, both of which combined architecture and graphics in a striking fashion. Such projects also reinforced his belief in the desirability of cross-disciplinary work in the arts. Later he remembered how, after completing the UIA project "we all felt very pleased with each other and have I suppose often wondered why such occasions, generous and spontaneous are so rare". Three years later he designed a pavilion at the Milan Triennale, for which he was awarded Gran Premio. Fletcher Forbes Gill, the design company that Crosby would subsequently join, produced the graphics for the pavilion.

== 1960s: Urban studies ==
For a short time Crosby headed up the experimental Design Group attached to the building contractors Taylor Woodrow, and he brought members of Archigram in to work under him. The Design Group focussed on three main urban projects (none of which were carried out as proposed): for Euston Station; for a section of Fulham in West London, and for the centre of Hereford in south west England. The Euston project envisaged a city of towers to replace the Victorian station and Arch, demolished in 1961–2. The Fulham Study was requested by the Minister of Housing and Local Government, and envisaged "an improbably massive redevelopment" of the area, which drew on the Smithsons' earlier projects for Sheffield and Berlin. At the same time a new form of prefabricated dwelling was experimented with, "the only constraint" upon which "was that it should stack up into a tower structure". For Fulham, the pod-like units were arranged in terraces (compared by Crosby to Georgian terraces) and towers. This housing system had "originated in discussions for the CIAM Congress 1955", and illustrated ideas shared with the Brutalists and Team X. Indeed, for all his subsequent questioning of modernist urban theory Crosby never lost faith in the Smithsons' call for an architecture "Without Rhetoric."

== 1960s and 1970s: Design ==
In 1965, on the departure of Bob Gill from the design partnership Fletcher Forbes Gill, Crosby joined to form Crosby Fletcher Forbes, reportedly after Fletcher and Forbes had considered extending their proposals for the corporate identity of Shell Petroleum to encompass the architecture of Shell gas stations. The decision to have an architect on the team was soon vindicated when Reuters, having asked Crosby to redesign its boardroom, was then persuaded to work with Fletcher on a new corporate identity and logo. The team "had an ability to combine the formal restraint of Swiss modernism with the wit of the Madison Avenue advertising industry", which "set them apart from other British design firms"

In 1972 the three were joined by Kenneth Grange and Mervyn Kurlansky, to form Pentagram, which was organised as a horizontal cooperative of equals, in which profits were shared, and staff and overheads pooled. Pentagram went on to build up a formidable worldwide reputation. Throughout the Pentagram years Crosby's passion for publication was expressed through a provocative series of "Pentagram Papers" (the title most likely a punning reference to the Pentagon Papers, leaked in 1971).

== 1970s and 1980s: Revisionism ==
During the 1970s a number of factors led Crosby to review the fundamental tenets of modernist architecture and urbanism, causing him to look critically at his own efforts of the 1960s, and setting him at odds with many of his architectural colleagues. A profound sense that architecture and urbanism had become a "game" played between experts, which left the public on the sidelines, led him to champion public participation in planning. His 1973 Hayward Gallery exhibition "How to play the environment game" was an extensive, accessible primer on the manifold factors that determine the shape and appearance of the city. In this exhibition Crosby rehearsed many of the arguments he would deploy until his death against the strident modernism adopted during the 1960s: the need to value history and, in particular, the monument; the necessity of bringing back craftsmanship to the environment; the requirement to understand what grants a place identity; the importance of sensible regulation; and the need to retrieve the city from mere money interests. He admits to having been influenced in his critique of the modernist city by the writings of Jane Jacobs—a "prophet of sanity" to whom he devoted a section of the exhibition. After concluding at the Hayward, the exhibition travelled through England, Scotland and Wales, ending up in Stockholm.

It was in the Hayward exhibition too that Crosby introduced his notion of a "Pessimist Utopia": a Utopia appropriate for a time when it seemed affluence and cheap natural resources could not be relied upon to continue; and which would have to be forged, not from grand ideologies, but from small things readily to hand. This was an argument expanded two years later in a pair of "Lethaby Lectures" jointly entitled "The Pessimist Utopia", which Crosby delivered to the Royal College of Art, and subsequently published as a Pentagram Paper. Now fully under the influence of Jane Jacobs, and also of E. F. Schumacher (whose Small Is Beautiful had been published two years before), Crosby argued that his own sphere, design—centred as it was on small enterprises—provided an attractive alternative to the bureaucratic model of decision-making then prevalent. In this, and in other respects, these lectures anticipated the enterprise culture of the 1980s and 1990s.

== 1980s and 1990s: traditional values ==
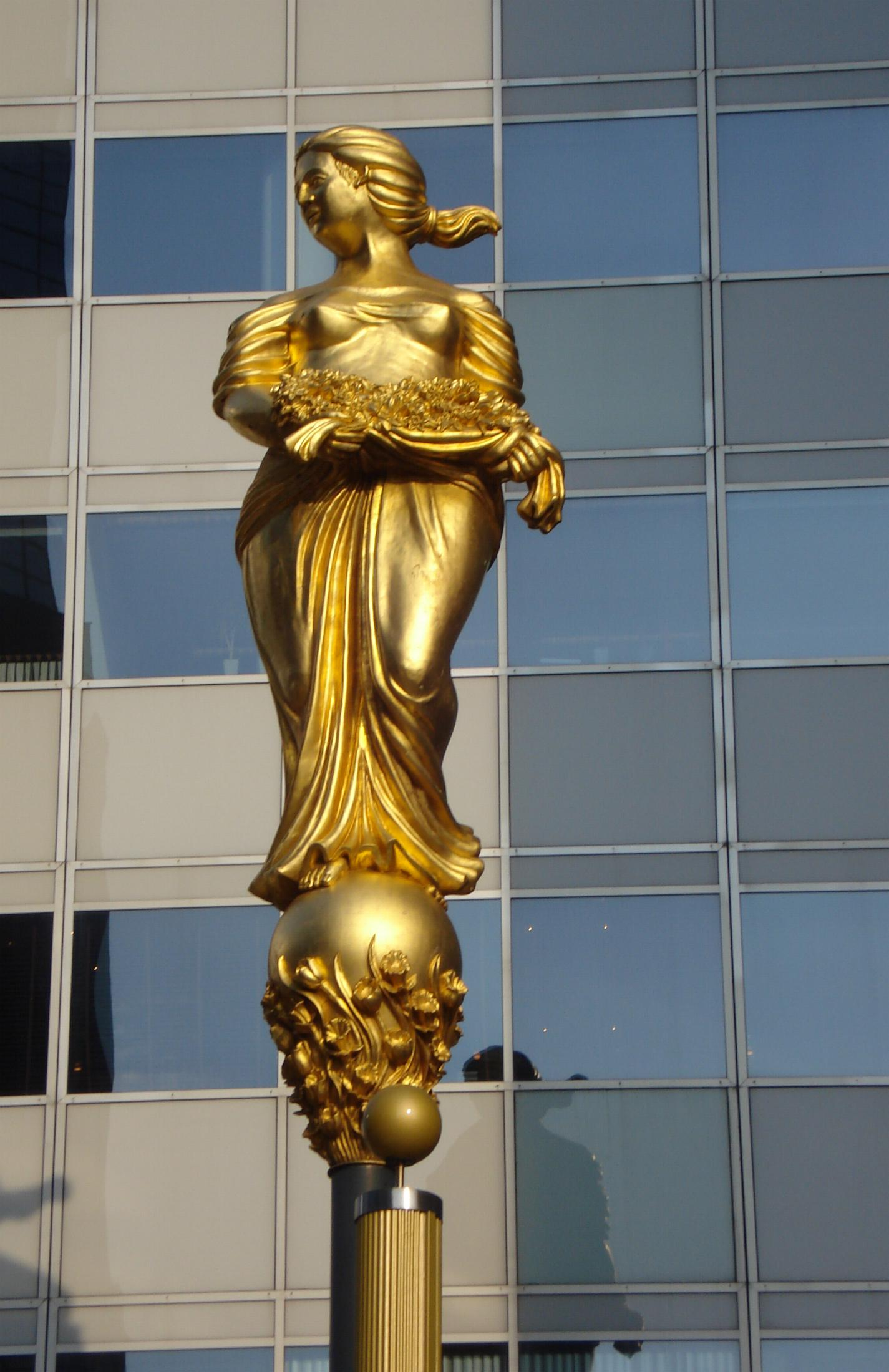
Crosby's 6m high sculpture "Flora", the Plaza Centre, Rotterdam, 1992.

In 1982 Crosby was elected an Associate of the Royal Academy of Arts (ARA: he was elevated to full RA status in 1990), and set up the Art and Architecture Society to encourage greater co-operation across disciplines, and greater use of artists and craftspeople by developers. A&A championed a "Percent for Art" scheme in the UK, which was subsequently adopted after being taken up by larger arts organisations. He produced a Register of Artists and Craftsmen in Architecture.

In 1987 he was invited to become a member of a select group advising The Prince of Wales on ways of promoting his agenda for architecture and urbanism. The group helped to draft the Prince's influential speech to the 1987 Corporation of London Planning and Communication Committee's Annual Dinner which kick-started his campaign for Paternoster Square. The campaign also helped to shape the Prince's BBC television programme A Vision of Britain—later a book and V&A exhibition). This led to his Summer Schools in Civil Architecture (1990–93), which evolved first into The Prince of Wales's Institute of Architecture (1992–2001), and subsequently The Prince's Foundation for the Built Environment.

Many aspects of the Prince's agenda had been earlier anticipated by Crosby: for example the critique of large-scale 1960s planning; the call for wider participation; the desire to re-incorporate art and craft in the built environment; and the acceptance of formal and stylistic "games" designed to minimise the effects of large-scale development. A number of the "10 Principles We Can Build Upon", which formed the core of the argument of A Vision of Britain (The Place, Hierarchy, Scale, Harmony, Enclosure, Materials, Decoration, Art, Signs & Lights, and Community) were indebted to Crosby.

Crosby's largely unhappy tenure as Professor of Architecture and Design at the Royal College of Art from 1990 to 1993 was initially seen as a way of influencing architectural education in line with such principles. However, soon after he took up the post, the Prince decided, along with his advisers, that a better course might be to establish an independent Institute of Architecture. The RCA had been founded on the principle that architects and diverse craftspeople could be educated together, but Crosby's approach to the teaching curriculum was considered by many RCA students to be too traditional and limiting of creative freedom. He met with much resistance, which took its toll on his health. He set out his "hopes and intentions" as Professor in his Inaugural Address as follows:

"The new education for architects and designers and artists must aim for a public, rather than a private expression. We must design to include pleasurable work for others, and ... learn to transcend the industrial system ... [W]e have to invest in convivial work ... This means among many other things, to encourage art and craft of every kind, to make them part of the public realm; to make out of a necessity a kind of utopia where everything is beautiful ... That means more intelligence at every level"

During this period, Crosby tried (with Peter Lloyd-Jones) to generate interest in what he termed a "New Domesday Book": a collaborative effort—beginning as an Inventory of Crosby's own neighbourhood of Spitalfields—to record the existing state of British streets, to serve as data for architects working remotely from their sites; and to provide planning officers with a better sense of the importance of the ensembles present in British towns and cities. The enterprise didn't survive him, but since his death new technologies (such as Google Street View) have realised its ambitions to a greater extent than he could have hoped.

== The Globe and other architectural works ==
Crosby didn't live to see the completion of the rebuilding of Shakespeare's Globe on the south bank of the Thames. Here he was able to put into effect many of his long-held convictions about building, including something he had recommended in his "Pessimist Utopia" lectures: breaking down a large-scale development into smaller, more visually comprehensible, parts. In addition to the "wooden O" itself, he provided a smaller theatre based on a design by Inigo Jones, and a highly decorated structure housing a restaurant, all set within a piazza placed above an open-plan booking hall. For the Globe itself (to which he devoted 17 years of historical research), Crosby insisted upon natural materials (oak and thatch) and high quality craftsmanship, "Man-made materials [being] banned from the site"

Equally important to the project was Crosby's never-say-die attitude, and his belief in the power of demonstration. By 1990 activity on site had virtually stalled, after 20 years of effort by the project's main protagonist, Sam Wanamaker. An approach was first made, at Crosby's behest, to The Prince of Wales, to see whether he could take over the patronage of the project from his father, the Duke of Edinburgh, but protocol forbade it. The breakthrough occurred shortly after this, when Wanamaker was persuaded to construct some trial bays of the building, to hint at what a finished building would look like: a characteristic Crosby initiative, which helped to unlock sufficient public and private funds to realise the vision.

Some years before the conversion of Bankside Power Station to become Tate Modern, and the opening of the Millennium Bridge link to St. Paul's Cathedral—when the immediate neighbourhood of the Globe was visibly neglected—Crosby had the imagination to visualise his new complex standing at the centre of a new, vibrant, cultural quarter, which he referred to as "Shakespeare Village".

Other notable works include:

- Alterations to Chalcot House, Wiltshire;
- Ulster Terrace conversion, Regent's Park, London (an early example of a new building behind a preserved facade);
- Unilever House interiors, Blackfriars, London, 1979 (a "test bed for the reintroduction of artists into the building process"; disposed of in the 2006–07 refurbishment of the building);
- NMB Bank interiors, Amsterdam, 1983–7;
- Battle of Britain Monument (project, with Pedro Guedes and Michael Sandle), 1987;
- Barbican Centre interior improvements, City of London (overtaken by 2005–06 improvements).

Other books include:

- An Anthology of Houses (with Monica Pidgeon, 1960);
- Architecture: city sense (1965);
- A Sign Systems Manual (with Alan Fletcher and Colin Forbes, 1970);
- The Necessary Monument (1970);
- Let's Build a Monument (1987);
- Stonehenge Tomorrow (with Peter Lloyd-Jones, 1992).

== Personal life ==
Crosby's first wife was Anne Buchanan; they had two children. His second wife was Polly Hope.

Crosby and his first wife, Anne, were involved in the development of MacIntyre School for children with Down's Syndrome.
