= Facetti =

Facetti is an Italian surname. Notable people with the surname include:

- Carlo Facetti (born 1935), Italian racing driver
- Germano Facetti (1926–2006), Italian graphic designer
