= British Constructivists =

Organisation of fine artists (1951 to 1969)

The British Constructivists, also called the Constructionist Group, or Constructionists, were an informally constituted group of British artists, working in a constructivist mode, with no formal membership or manifesto. The groups most active period was between 1951 and 1955, when its members exhibited in ten London exhibitions, produced two broadsheets and were involved in the publication of two books on abstract art.

Alastair Grieve's book Constructed Abstract Art in England: a neglected avant-garde is the first to examine the work of this group in detail, followed by Alan Fowler's PhD thesis Constructivist Art in Britain 1913 – 2005.

== Membership ==
The core members of the Constructionist Group were:

- Victor Pasmore (1908–1998)
- Mary Martin (1907–1969)
- Kenneth Martin (1905–1984)
- Anthony Hill (1930–2020)
- Adrian Heath (1920–1992)
- Robert Adams (1917–1984)

== Milieu ==
At first, Constructivism "promoted the synthesis of painting, sculpture and architecture in the construction of a better environment for a new society. In later years, although the work still conformed to formal constructivist characteristic, this idealism was eroded and the primary focus became the internal logic of the art object, rather than any overt social or utilitarian function."

Constructive art developed much later in Britain than on the European continent, where the International Faction of Constructivists was formed in Düsseldorf in 1922, with no British members. At that time the British art world was influenced by critics like Roger Fry and Clive Bell, who promoted a form of art looking back to post-impressionism rather than anything connected with the new developments in Europe.

In Britain, the only significant event in the field of constructive art occurred in 1937, when a book entitled CIRCLE together with an exhibition called the International Survey of Constructive Art, was staged in London, incorporating painting, sculpture and architecture.

As the Second World War threatened, many artists left Europe to move to London, including Gabo, Mondrian, Gropius, Schwitters, Moholy-Nagy, Marcel Breuer, Oskar Kokoschka and patron Peggy Guggenheim. For "subtle reasons of history and temperament", none of their ideas took root in London, despite Mondrian's link with Ben Nicholson.

In 1951 the opposition to abstract art in Britain, especially constructed art, was still strong. After the Second World War, many art administrators, dealers and critics felt that the initial interest in abstract art developed on the continent would soon diminish. Many leading members of the British art establishment, such as Edward Marsh, Douglas Cooper, Kenneth Clark and John Rothenstein, disliked abstract art. They believed a neo-Romantic form of figurative art would soon become popular.

In Britain, the opportunity to see abstract art from the continent was rare, and so London art schools after the war became important testing grounds for new abstract art. Victor Pasmore taught at the Camberwell School of Arts and Crafts, together with Elliott Seabrooke and Kenneth Martin. Seabrooke knew J.W. Power whose book, Éléments de la construction picturale, was to have an influence on the Constructionists. The group communicated with Charles Biederman, whose books Art as the Evolution of Visual Knowledge, and Letters on the New Art had an important influence. Kenneth Martin later taught at Goldsmiths' College and the Central School.

The influence of Pasmore, Kenneth and Mary Martin and Hill – as art teachers and writers – on a younger generation of British abstract artists is reflected in the formation of the later Systems Group.

== Constructionist Art ==
The work of the Constructionist Group is variously described as: constructionist, constructed abstract art, constructed art, structurist art, concrete art, and syntactic art.

Constructionist art is defined by art historian Alastair Grieve as "non-figurative art that was not abstracted from the appearance of nature but constructed from within and built up of balanced relations of clear, geometric forms."

Kenneth Martin explains that Constructionist art "... is not the reduction to a simple form of the complex scene before us. It is the building by simple elements of an expressive whole."

Mary Martin clarifies that "Constructed abstract art is not the same as Constructivism ... The process is nuclear and it is in this that it differs from Constructivism. That is to say that one commences with a single cell, or unit, a logical process of growth is applied and ... the whole, or the effect, is unforeseen until the work is complete".

== Group exhibitions ==
=== While the group was active (1951–1956) ===
Although Pasmore had converted from figurative to abstract art as early as 1948, it was not until 1951 that other abstract artists started to exhibit with Pasmore, who was a member of The London Group – a society of London artists seeking to exhibit their works outside the Royal Academy of Arts.

Their initial exhibition was in February 1951 at The London Group and included Victor Pasmore, Robert Adams, Adrian Heath, Anthony Hill, Mary Martin, Kenneth Martin, as well as West Country abstractionists Barbara Hepworth, Ben Nicholson, Roger Hilton, and Terry Frost. Others included an abstract painting by Bernard Carter (1920-2014), mobiles by Vivian Proctor and Raymond Elston, and sculptures by Eduardo Paolozzi, and William Turnbull.

This was followed by a more ambitious exhibition from 22 May to 11 June 1951, entitled Abstract Paintings, Sculptures, Mobiles, at the AIA gallery, organised by Heath with the help of Kenneth Martin and Pasmore. Martin, who himself had broken away from figurative art in the winter of 1949–50, exhibited his first abstract paintings in the summer of 1950.

The group exhibited together once again in their First Weekend Exhibition in March 1952 at Adrian Heath's studio in 22 Fitzroy Street, London. It was advertised as a weekend exhibition of sculptures, mobiles, paintings and constructions by Robert Adams, Adrian Heath, Anthony Hill, Mary Martin, Kenneth Martin, Victor Pasmore and Trevor Dannatt, who arranged the exhibition. Though not advertised, Terry Frost also showed.

A Second Weekend Exhibition of abstract paintings, constructions, sculptures and mobiles was held in July 1952 at 22 Fitzroy Street, this time including words by Barbara Hepworth, Denis Mitchell, Ben Nicholson and Raymond Elston.

In December 1952 the AIA gallery organised an exhibition in New Burlington Galleries called The Mirror and the Square. The aim was to display artwork ranging from the realistic to the abstract, this time including Eduardo Paolozzi and Trevor Dannatt.

A Third Weekend Exhibition was held in May 1953 at 22 Fitzroy Street, showing also furniture and photomurals. As well as the six core Constructionists, there included Ben Nicholson, Roger Hilton, Terry Frost, Raymond Elston (a mobile), Eduardo Paolozzi, William Scott, Vera Spencer, Terence Conran (a chair), and Denis Williams.

Pasmore accepted a job in Newcastle in 1954, which started to affect group cohesion. In January 1955, Adrian Heath organised the Nine Abstract Artists exhibition at the Redfern Gallery, together with a book of the same title. The nine featured artists were: Robert Adams, Terry Frost, Adrian Heath, Anthony Hill, Roger Hilton, Kenneth Martin, Mary Martin, Victor Pasmore and William Scott.

One of the most significant exhibitions was This Is Tomorrow, held at the Whitechapel Gallery in August 1956. It was organised around a constructivist theme and included architects, painters and sculptors. Contributing members of the group included: Richard Hamilton, John Ernest, Anthony Hill, Denis Williams, Eduardo Paolozzi, Victor Pasmore, Kenneth Martin, Mary Martin and Adrian Heath.

=== After the group declined (1957–1969) ===
Statements: A Review of British Abstract Art in 1956 was held in January 1957 at the ICA. This was followed by Dimensions: British Abstract Art 1948–57, held in December 1957 at the O'Hana Gallery, with the cooperation of the ICA. Although the Constructionist Group produced Broadsheet No.3, it was now in decline and members exhibited only as individuals.

Max Bill organised Konkrete Kunst in June 1960 at the Helmhaus Museum, Zurich, in which Victor Pasmore, Mary Martin, Kenneth Martin and Anthony Hill took part.

An exhibition entitled British Constructivist Art toured the US between October 1961 and October 1962.

On 10 May 1962, Mary Martin, Kenneth Martin, Victor Pasmore, Colin Jones, Peter Lowe and Jeffrey Steele took part in The Geometric Environment at the A.I.A. Gallery in London. On 18 May, at the Stedelijk Museum in Amsterdam, an overlapping exhibition, Experiment in Constructie, was held in which Mary Martin, Anthony Hill and John Ernest participated.

The Arts Council arranged the exhibition Construction England to tour England and Wales in April 1963. Of the Constructionists, Hill, Kenneth and Mary Martin and Wise showed. The exhibition also included works by a younger generation of pupils and associates: Derek Carruthers, Matt Rugg Colin Jones, Peter Lowe and Gillian Wise.

Many other exhibitions were held in the mid to late sixties to which former members of the group contributed. Notable is Relief/Construction/Relief which opened in Chicago in October 1968 and in which Victor Pasmore, Gillian Wise, Mary Martin and John Ernest contributed; however it did little to promote the work of the English artists in North America.

In 1969 Pasmore left to live in Malta, ceasing to make constructed reliefs. Early that year Kenneth Martin, Mary Martin and Anthony Hill were invited by Jeffrey Steele to participate in the Systeemi•System exhibition at the Amos Anderson Art Museum in Helsinki but declined; Mary Martin died in October that year.

At the turn of the decade, as the Constructionist Group era drew to a close, a new group of British constructivists emerged in 1969 called the Systems Group.

== See also ==
- Systems Group – successor to the Constructionist Group
- Constructivism
- Marlow Moss – an early British constructivist
