= Raymond Elston =

British designer and artist

Raymond Elston was a British textile designer, furniture designer and abstract artist. He was influenced by abstract expressionism and modernist principles and is remembered for his early work with the fashion and furniture designer Terence Conran, and for the mobiles he exhibited in the early 1950s with the Constructionist Group.

== Early life and education ==
Little is known of Elston's early life. He attended the Central School of Arts and Crafts between 1948 and 1951. Victor Pasmore taught there during this period, during which Elston got to know Anthony Hill and Terence Conran.

== Career and artistic style ==
In 1951 Elston, "a trained fashion designer", worked with Terence Conran, making denim clothes for the Lancashire-based textiles company David Whitehead Ltd, as well as making wood and metal furniture with Conran and Gill Pickles. He shared lodgings in Sloane Court West with syntactic artist Anthony Hill, after Conran had moved out.

In 1964, Elston was designing interiors and furniture for Contract Interiors Ltd at 203 Kings Road, London SW3. Some of his work is illustrated in Conran's books.

Elston had been a member of the Chelsea Arts Club in London since at least 1993. In 1994 he was interviewed by author Nicholas Ind whose book, entitled Terence Conran: The Authorised Biography, recounts Elston's early experiences with Conran and Anthony Hill.

Elston's artistic style, based on his work with mobiles, stabiles and furniture design, was abstract and modernist.

== Artistic output ==
Elston is largely remembered for his mobiles, reflecting the influence of Alexander Calder, however the main body of his work throughout his life involved designing and manufacturing textiles together with furniture design and decoration, initially in collaboration with his friend Terence Conran.

Examples of Elston's work can be found in exhibition photographs taken between 1951 and 1953, books published by Conran and other authors, articles in journals and websites. (Note: Five abstract paintings, signed "Raymond Elston", were auctioned in England in 2017, however their provenance has not yet been established.)

== Exhibitions and legacy ==
Elston exhibited his work with Adrian Hill and other members of the Constructionist Group, between 1951 and 1953; Conran joining him in the Third Weekend Exhibition. Neither Elston nor Conran contributed to subsequent fine-art shows; Conran expressing disappointment at the lack of interest in his own work.

- Abstract Paintings, Sculptures, Mobiles, 22 May - 11 June 1951, A.I.A. Gallery
- Second Weekend Exhibition, 11–14 July 1952, 22 Fitzroy Street
- Third Weekend Exhibition, 1–4 May 1953, 22 Fitzroy Street

== Sources ==
- Fowler, Alan (2006), Constructivist Art in Britain 1913-2005, Winchester School of Art
- Grieve, Alastair (1990). "Towards an art of environment: exhibitions and publications by a group of avant-garde abstract artists in London 1951-55". The Burlington Magazine. 132, No. 1052 (November): 773–781.
- Grieve, Alastair (2005), Constructed Abstract Art in England After the Second World War: A Neglected Avant-Garde, Yale University Press, ISBN 978-0-300-10703-6
- Ind, Nicholas (1995). Terence Conran: The Authorised Biography. Sidgwick & Jackson. ISBN 0 283 06201 0.
- Jobse, Jonneke (2005). De Stijl Continued: The Journal Structure (1958-1964) An Artists' Debate. Rotterdam: OIO Publishers. ISBN 90 6450 577 2.
- Montfort, Anne (20 October 2012). Reconstitution D'une Abstraction: Geneèse et Définition D'use Forme D'art Constructif à Londres de 1927 à 1961 (PDF). Université François - Rebelais de Tours.
- Conran, Terence (2016). My Life in Design. London Conran Octopus.
- "The Life of Terence Conran". Christian Watson.
- "Koya co-founder Shuko Oda on the mid-century pieces that fill her 1960s townhouse in Forest Hill, south-east London". The Modern House.
- Young, Dennis; Young, Barbara (1964). Furniture in Britain Today. New York: George Wittenborn.
- Chelsea Arts Club 1993 Yearbook. Chelsea Arts Club Ltd. 1993.
- Morris, Lynda; Radford, Robert (1983). The Story of the AIA, Artists International Association, 1933 - 1953. Oxford: The Museum of Modern Art.
- Inchbald, Jaqueline (1965). Interior Design and Decoration '66. Design Yearbook Ltd.
- Conran, Terence (1974). The House Book. Crown Publishers. ISBN 0-517-52627-1.
- Conran, Terence (1976). Le grand livre de la décoration contemporaine. Elsevier Séquoia. ISBN 2-8003-0159-7.

== See also ==
- British Constructivists
