= Patrick Crooke =

- Born: Patrick William Crooke; 12 July 1927
- Died: 9 September 2018 (aged 91)
- Education: Berkhamsted School; Architectural Association School of Architecture
- Occupations: Architect; Researcher
- Employers: Universidad of the Andes; University of Khartoum; University College London
- Relatives: William Crooke (grandfather)

Patrick William Crooke (12 July 1927 – 9 September 2018) was a British architect and researcher whose work focused on urban development and housing in developing cities in the global south.

== Biography ==
Crooke studied at the Architectural Association School of Architecture from 1944 to 1952 where he met fellow student John F. C. Turner. His thesis project, Zone – A Sustainable City Region, was co-authored with Andrew Derbyshire and John Voelcker. His first commission after graduating was with Andrew Derbyshire to design a house for composer Edward Williams. From 1954 to 1955 Crooke undertook a one-year scholarship in Milan with the architectural practice BBPR. In Milan he met Herman Samper, the dean of architecture at the University of the Andes in Bogota who recruited Crooke to the university.

In 1958 Crooke joined Turner in Arequipa, Peru, to assist in the reconstruction following an earthquake. Crooke and Turner persuaded the mayor to finance a scheme to support homeless residents to build their own homes. As supervising architect Crooke oversaw a team of agricultural students, foremen and masons assisting residents in the construction. From 1958 he worked on a programme of school building for the Peruvian education ministry under Jorge Basadre.

In the 1960s Crooke taught in Sudan at the University of Khartoum before moving to Ibadan, Nigeria and working as a consultant for the International Labour Organisation. In 1967 the United Nations commissioned him to lead a research project on informal settlements in 16 countries. Crooke later taught at the Development Planning Unit at University College London and the Institute for Housing Studies in Rotterdam.

== Publications ==
- Brausch, Georges; Crooke, Patrick; Shaw, John (1964). Bashaqra Area Settlements 1963: A Case Study in Village Development in the Gezira Scheme. University of Khartoum.
- Butler, John; Crooke, Patrick (1973). Urbanization. Sydney: Angus & Robertson. ISBN 978-0-20-795570-9.
