= Forde Everard de Wend Cayley =

British physician

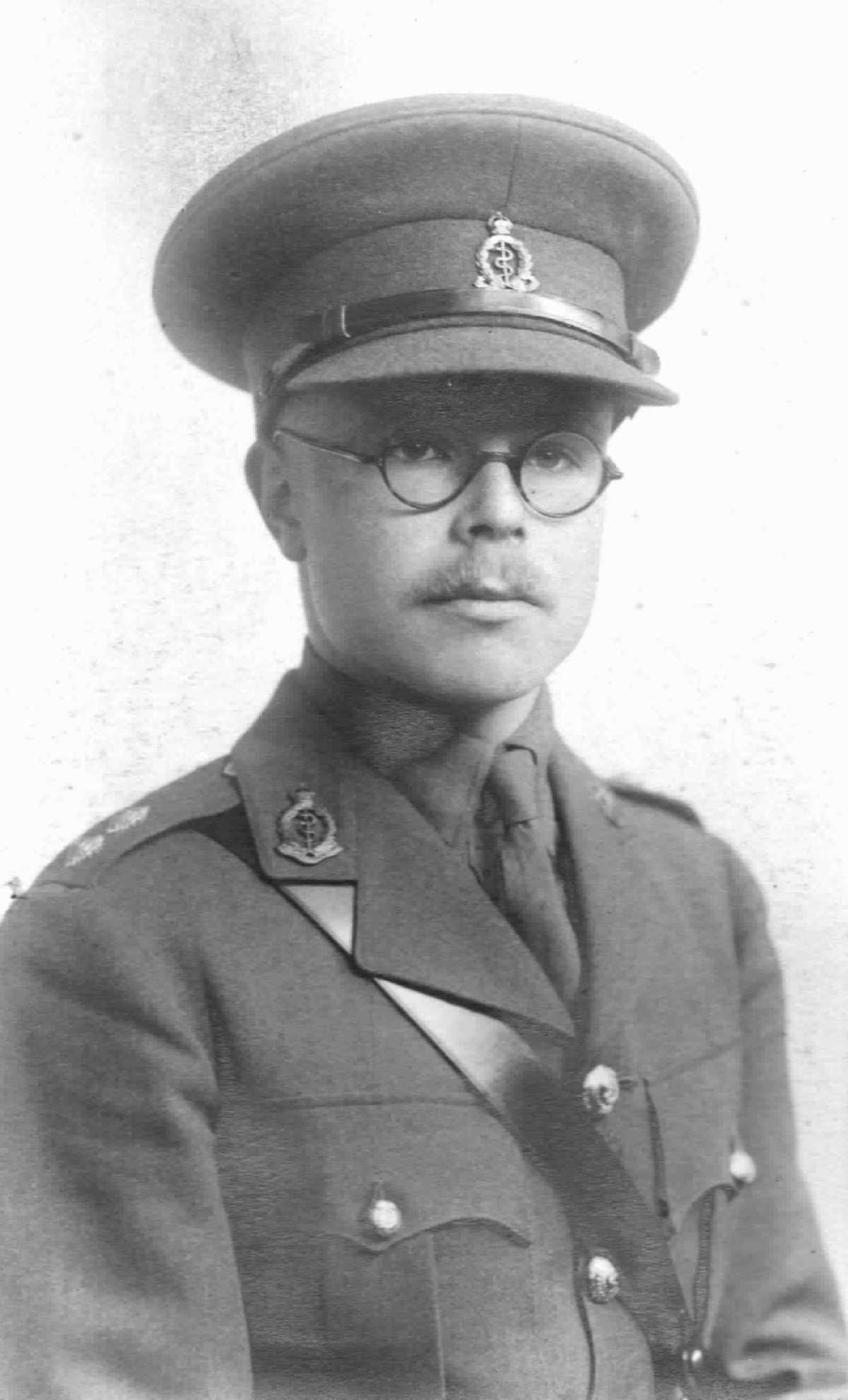
Forde Everard de Wend Cayley (1915–2004) in uniform in 1941

Forde Everard de Wend Cayley (1 November 1915 – 17 August 2004) was a British physician who was physician superintendent at Bevendean Hospital for Chest Diseases. He survived great deprivations whilst spending time in a Japanese prisoner of war camp during the Second World War.

== Life ==
Forde Cayley was born in Ealing, London on 1 November 1915. His parents were Osbert Arthur Cayley (a solicitor) and Dorothy, maiden name Lewis. He was educated at St Edmund's School, Hindhead, Cheltenham College and Middlesex Hospital Medical School, qualifying as a doctor in 1939, when he became a house physician at Middlesex Hospital.

On the outbreak of the Second World War he joined the Royal Army Medical Corps, being attached to the Suffolk Regiment, and served with British forces in France. After their evacuation an administrative error sent him for some weeks on a catering course. In September 1941 he married Eileen Lilian Dalton, daughter of a Principal Clerk at the Law Courts in central London. Shortly afterwards he was posted to the Far East. He was captured by the Japanese when Singapore fell in 1942, and was held for a time in Changi Prison before being sent to a succession of camps on the River Kwai. Medicines were in short supply, and Forde Cayley tapped local knowledge to use extracts from indigenous plants to treat other prisoners of war and Japanese soldiers. At one point the Japanese officers at his camp attempted to seize his medical kit for use solely to treat Japanese: he refused to let them take it and received a severe beating.

During the Japanese retreat he was taken to Nong Pladuk prisoner-of-war camp in Ban Pong District, Thailand. When allied planes made a bombing raid, there were many injuries and deaths among the prisoners. Forde Cayley escaped injury because he had taken shelter in a monsoon trench, but bomb splinters were embedded in his copy of Gone with the Wind which he had been using as a pillow. With food in very short supply, he came close to death from malabsorption. While he was recovering, he was again nearly killed in another allied bombing raid: all those who had taken shelter in the trench next to his died.

Forde Cayley was repatriated following the Japanese surrender. Although in poor health, with recurrent bouts of malaria, parasites and the effects of several years of poor nutrition, he sought work immediately on his return to England. He worked at St Stephen's Hospital in Chelsea (now incorporated into Chelsea and Westminster Hospital) and then the Royal Brompton Hospital before, in early 1951, taking up the consultant-level post of medical superintendent of Bevendean Hospital on the outskirts of Brighton, where he remained until his retirement, after which he undertook work as a locum. For his first years at Bevendean Hospital most of his patients had tuberculosis, and he helped to test new drug therapies.

Forde Cayley died in a nursing home in Thames Ditton, Surrey on 17 August 2004.

== Selected publications ==
- A Doctor in Peace and War: Memoirs of Dr. Forde Cayley. 2001. ISBN 9780954095604
