= Emilio Scanavino =

Italian artist (1922–1986)

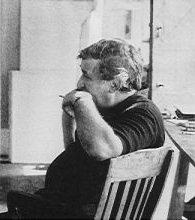
- Born: Emilio Scanavino; 28 February 1922; Genoa, Italy
- Died: 28 November 1986 (aged 64); Milan, Italy
- Known for: Painter, sculptor
- Movement: Tachism, Lyrical Abstraction

Emilio Scanavino (28 February 1922 – 28 November 1986) was an Italian painter and sculptor.

== Early life ==
Scanavino was born in Genoa. In 1938 he enrolled to the Art School Nicolò Barabino where he met Mario Calonghi, who was teaching at the school and was due to be a great influence on Scanavino's artistic formation. In 1942 he had his first exhibition at the Salone Romano of Genoa. In the same year he enrolled at the Faculty of Architecture at the Milan University.In 1946 he married Giorgina Graglia.

In 1947 Scanavino moved to Paris where he met poets and artists such as Edouard Jaguer, Wols and Camille Bryen. This experience proved to be inspirational. He was especially interested in Cubism, which he rendered into a personal interpretation when he exhibited at the Gallery Isola in Genoa in 1948. In 1950 Scanavino and Rocco Borrella joined "I sette del Numero", an artistic group revolving around the Numero Gallery in Florence. In the same year he was invited to the 27th edition of the Venice Biennale and in 1951 he had a two-person exhibition with the sculptor Sarah Jackson at the Apollinaire Gallery in London.

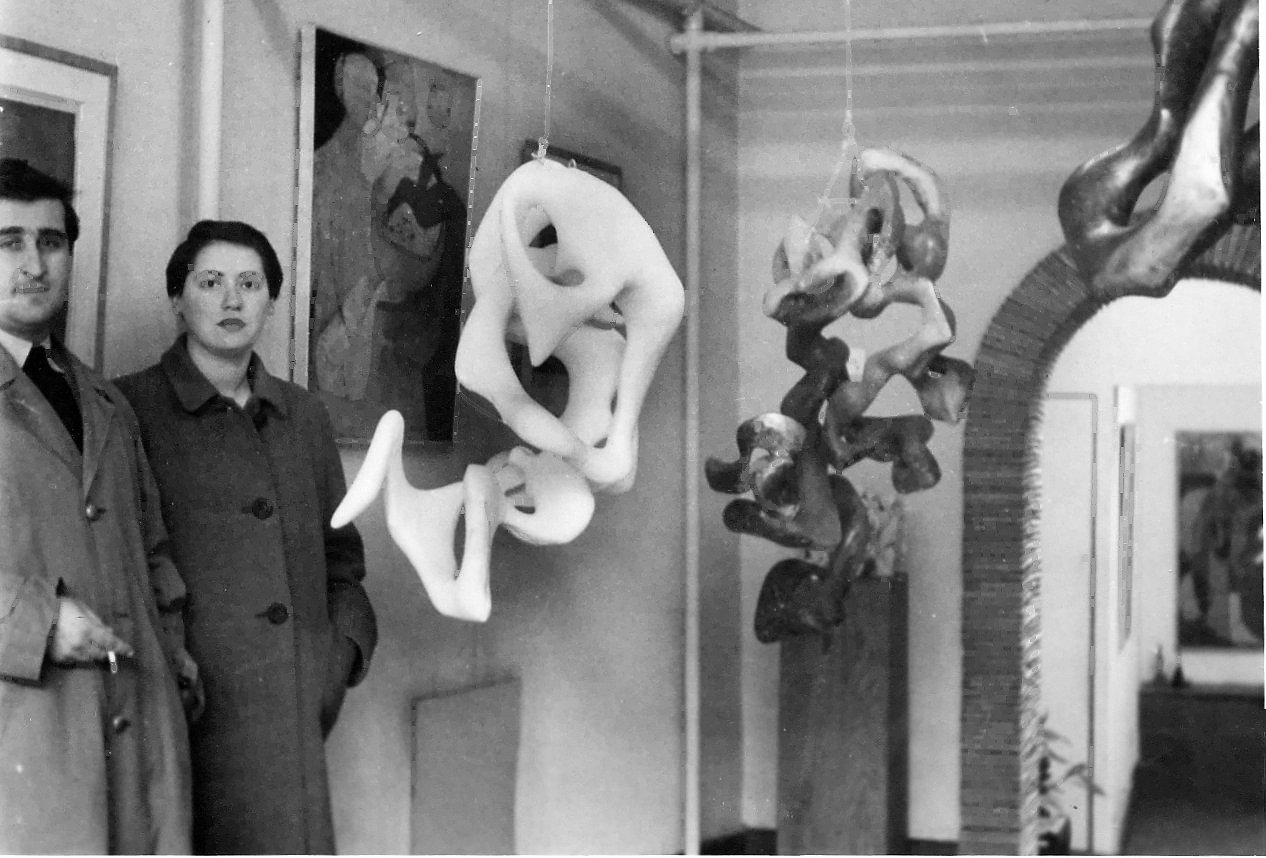
Emilio Scanavino and Sarah Jackson in London, 1951

During his time in London Scanavino met Phillip Martin, Eduardo Paolozzi, Graham Sutherland and Francis Bacon. In the same year he opened his first studio in Milan in an attic in Foro Bonaparte. Critic Guido Ballo and dealers Guido Le Noci and Arturo Schwartz were early supporters of his works.

In 1952, Scanavino worked at the Marzotti's Ceramic Factory in Albissola Marina, where he met and befriended many artists, including Lucio Fontana, Asger Jorn, Corneille, Roberto Matta, Wifredo Lam, Giuseppe Capogrossi, Enrico Baj, Sergio Dangelo, Roberto Crippa, Gianni Dova, Agenore Fabbri and Aligi Sassu.

In 1954 he exhibited again at the Venice Biennale and in 1955 he received the Graziano Prize. In 1958 he won the Lissone Prize and the Prampolini Prize for a solo presentation at the Venice Biennale. In the same year he moved to Milan where he joined the Naviglio Gallery directed by Carlo Cardazzo with whom he established a long-standing friendship and proficuous working relation. In Milan he also met the art collector Gianni Malabarba with whom he established a strong friendship.

== Later life ==
In 1962 Scanavino bought an old house in Calice Ligure, which he later converted into a studio space. In 1963, after winning the La Spezia Prize, Scanavino learned of the sudden death of Carlo Cardazzo. Cardazzo's brother, Renato, continued to run the Naviglio Gallery but the loss of Carlo had a huge impact in scanavino's life. After participating for the fourth time to the Venice Biennale, when he won the Pininfarina Prize, Scanavino permanently moved to Calice Ligure in 1968. In 1970 he won the Gran Prix at the 10th Mentone Biennale and met Franco Castelli, then editor of L'uomo e l'Arte, who became one of his closest friends and supporters.

In 1971 Scanavino had to undergo a major surgery operation. The recovery period signaled the start of a new creative phase in his painting. He travelled to Belgium, France and Germany, and in 1974 the Darmstadt Kunsthalle organized a comprehensive antological exhibition that later travelled to Venice's Palazzo Grassi and Milan's Royal Palace.

In 1982, Scanavino's health started to decline. His last exhibition was the 1986 edition of the Rome Quadriennale.

Scanavino died in Milan on 28 November 1986.

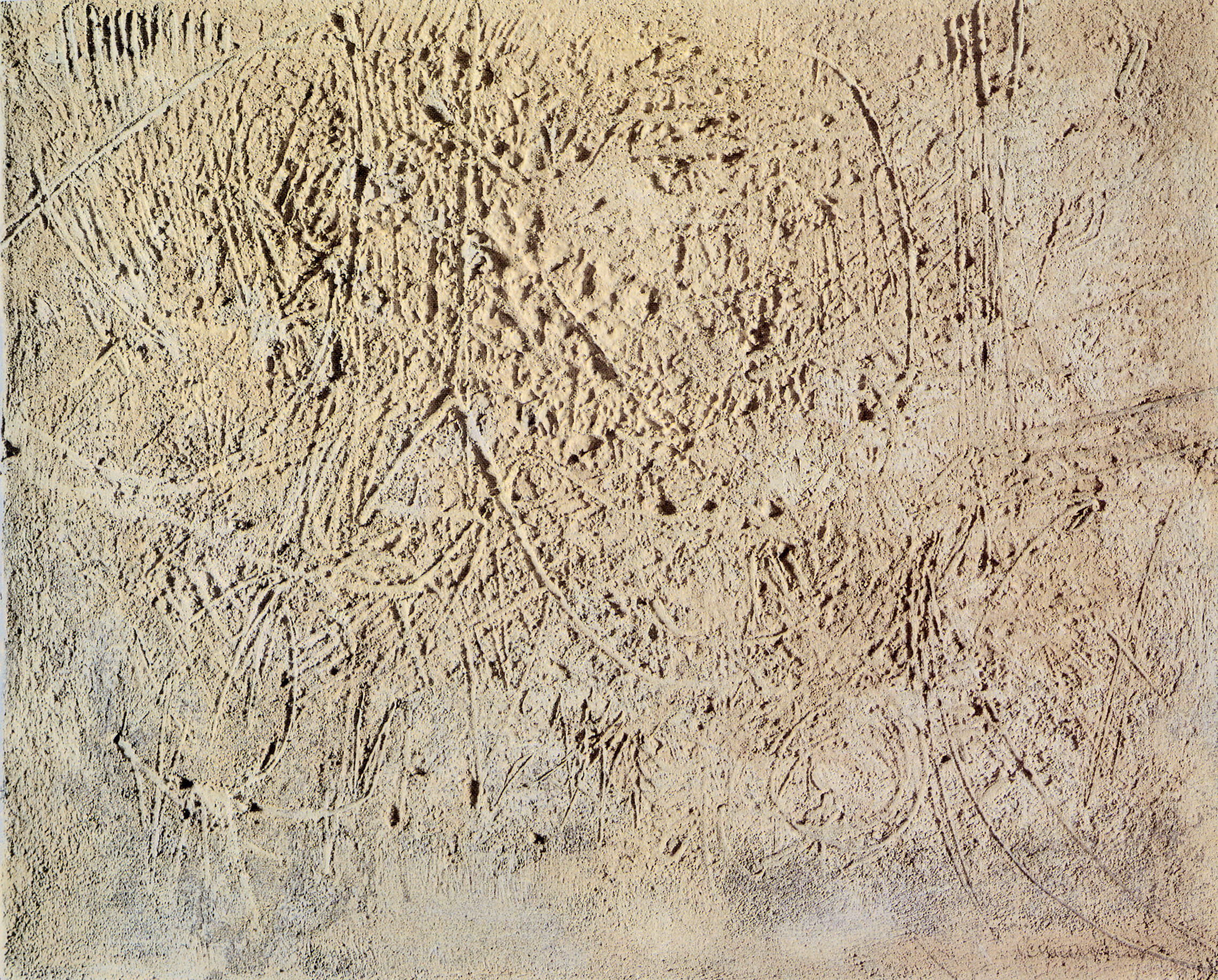
Il Muro, 1954. Oil on canvas, 105 x 120 cm

== Art ==
After an initial interest in figurative art, Scanavino's paintings took Post-Cubist nuances. His forms became increasingly stylized, until being completely obliterated in the works from the early 1950s. In 1954 his characteristic sign, “stylized knot”, started to appear. That is the, eventually marking his whole production. In the late 1970s years paintings, the “knot” became perfectly defined and recognizable, although his work became darker, sometimes even threatening due to the conspicuous presence of red stains resembling blood. Although Scanavino is difficult to place inside a specific artistic movement, he is considered an informal abstractist, close to the Abstract Expressionism and Hans Hartung and Georges Mathieu's art.

== See also ==
- Abstract art
- Abstract expressionism
- Arte Informale

== Biography ==
- Alain Jouffroy, La questione S, Edizioni AE, Genoa, 1963.
- Enrico Crispolti, Alain Jouffroy, Scanavino: io mani, Edizioni l’Uomo e l’Arte, Milan, 1971
- Francesco De Bartolomeis, Il progetto dell’irrazionale di Scanavino, Edizioni del Naviglio, Milan, 1972
- Alain Jouffroy, Scanavino. Bibli Opus, (Georges Fall) Editeur, Paris, 1973
- Roberto Sanesi, Scanavino, La Nuova Foglio Editrice, Macerata, 1979
- Giovanni Maria. Accame, Scanavino. Disegni e scritti inediti. Pierluigi Lubrina Editore, Bergamo, 1990
- G. Graglia, Giovanni Maria Accame, Scanavino. La scultura, Documenti dell’Archivio Scanavino, Edizioni Aspasia, Bologna, 2004
- Stephano Delphino, Gianni Viola, Emilio Scanavino & C - La leggenda degli Artusti di Calice Ligure, De Ferrari, Genoa.
- Rachele Ferrario, Scanavino e Crispolti. Carteggio e altri scritti. Silvana Editoriale, Cinisello Balsamo, 2006.
- Alberto Zanchetta, Emilio Scanavino - opere 1954-1983, Edizioni Dep Art, Milan, 2008.
