= St Edmund's School, Hindhead =

Coordinates: 51°6′31″N 0°44′47″W

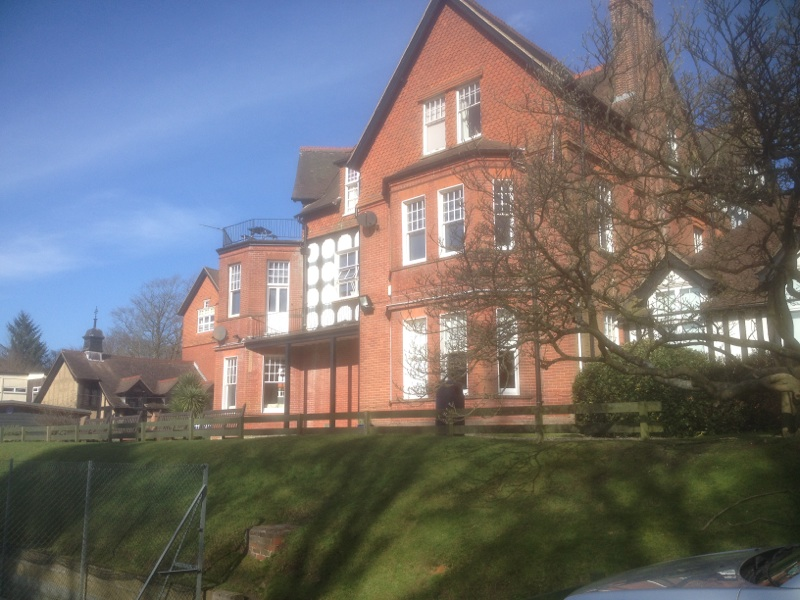
- The terrace, with chapel in the background at St Edmund's School
- Hindhead, Surrey, GU26 6BH; England

Information
- Type: Private school prep and senior school (boarding and day)
- Motto: Latin: Per manendo vincimus
- Established: 1874
- Department for Education URN: 125347 Tables
- Chairman of Governors: J. Alliss
- Headmaster: A. J. Walliker MA (Cantab.)
- Staff: 40 (approx.)
- Gender: Mixed
- Age: 2 to 16
- Enrolment: 420 pupils
- Website: saintedmunds.co.uk

St Edmund's School is a coeducational nursery, pre-prep, preparatory and senior school in Hindhead, Surrey, around 10.5 miles south-west from the town of Guildford.

== History ==
The school was founded in Hunstanton, Norfolk, in 1874. The school's original buildings in Hunstanton were purchased in 1901 by Howard Cambridge Barber and became the home of Glebe House School.

The school moved to Hindhead, Surrey, in 1900, into a large country house named Blen Cathra in grounds of some 35 acres (14 ha). George Bernard Shaw had lived there for a short time.

In 1968 the school had 130 boarders, and 25 day boys "taken for the first two years". In 1979 The St Edmund's School Charitable Trust was formed to help take the school forward, with Richard Saunders, an old boy, becoming its first Chairman of Governors.

For most of its existence St Edmund's was for boys only, however, with the first girls being admitted in 2008, the school is now co-educational. In 2014 the ISI report listed it as having 249 pupils. 173 boys and 76 girls.

In November 2024, the school's governance merged with St Hilary's School, Godalming, with both schools to retain their identities.

== Notable former pupils ==
And see Category:People educated at St Edmund's School, Hindhead

- King Abdullah II - King of Jordan
- Prince Faisal bin Hussein - younger brother of King Abdullah II of Jordan
- Timothy Garton Ash - British historian, author, commentator and Oxford professor
- John Bicknell Auden - Geologist, explorer and WHO official
- W. H. Auden - Poet
- Marcus Brigstocke - Comedian, television and radio personality
- Forde Everard de Wend Cayley (1915-2004) - World War II POW camp survivor
- Jonathan Dimbleby - Television and radio presenter, writer and political commentator
- Guy Farley - Musician and film composer
- Christopher Isherwood - Novelist
- Anthony Loyd - Journalist and war correspondent
- Iain Mackay-Dick - Major General of the Household Division and GOC of the London District
- Harold Edward Musson - Buddhist monk and author
- Wilfrid Noyce - English mountaineer and author. He was a member of the 1953 British Expedition that made the first ascent of Mount Everest
- John Schlesinger - Academy award winning film director
- John Shearman - Art historian
- Guy Siner - Stage, television and film actor
- Anthony Trafford, Baron Trafford - aristocrat, politician and physician
- John F. C. Turner - Architect and theorist

== Headmasters ==
- 1874 to 1899 Rev. J. Morgan-Brown MA (Oxf)
- 1901 to 1903 Wilfrid John Richmond, son-in-law of Rev. J. Morgan-Brown
- 1899 to 1929 Cyril Morgan Brown,
- 1929 to 1933 Ivor Sant
- 1933 to 1952 Ivo Bulley
- 1952 to 1978 Peter Weeks MA (Cantab)
- 1978 to 1991 Tony Pull (Oxf)
- 1991 to 1995 Andrew Sangster
- 1995 to 2000 Andrew Fowler-Watt
- 2000 to present A. J. Walliker, MA (Cantab)
