= Robert Adams (sculptor) =

English sculptor and designer (1917–1984)

- Born: 5 October 1917; Far Cotton, Northampton
- Died: 5 April 1984 (aged 67); Great Maplestead, Essex
- Education: Northampton School of Art
- Known for: Sculpture
- Movement: Modernism, abstract art
- Spouse: Patricia (née Devine)
- Children: Mary Adams (1963)

Robert Adams (5 October 1917 – 5 April 1984) was an English sculptor and designer. Whilst not widely known outside of artistic circles, he was nonetheless regarded as one of the foremost sculptors of his generation. In a critical review of a retrospective mounted by the Gimpel Fils gallery in London in 1993, Brian Glasser of Time Out magazine described Adams as "the neglected genius of post-war British sculpture", a sentiment echoed by Tim Hilton in the Sunday Independent, who ranked Adams' work above that of his contemporaries, Ken Armitage, Reg Butler, Lynn Chadwick and Bernard Meadows.

== Education and early life ==
Adams attended the village school in Hardingstone, Northamptonshire, now a suburb of the town of Northampton. He lived there until 1951. He left school at age 14 and did various manual jobs, firstly as a van-boy for a printer and later with the agricultural engineering company, Cooch & Sons, where experience gained in crafting metals proved useful in his later artistic creations.

From 1937 to 1946 he attended evening classes part-time in life drawing and painting at the Northampton School of Art.

During the Second World War, Adams was a conscientious objector, but joined the Civil Defence as a fire warden.

== Career ==
Some of his first sculptures were exhibited in London between 1942 and 1944 as part of group shows by artists working for Civil Defence

In April 1946 he exhibited fourteen of his early oil portraits in the Northampton Public Library.

Between 23 November 1947 and 3 January 1948, he held his first one-man exhibition at Gimpel Fils Gallery, 84 Duke Street, London.

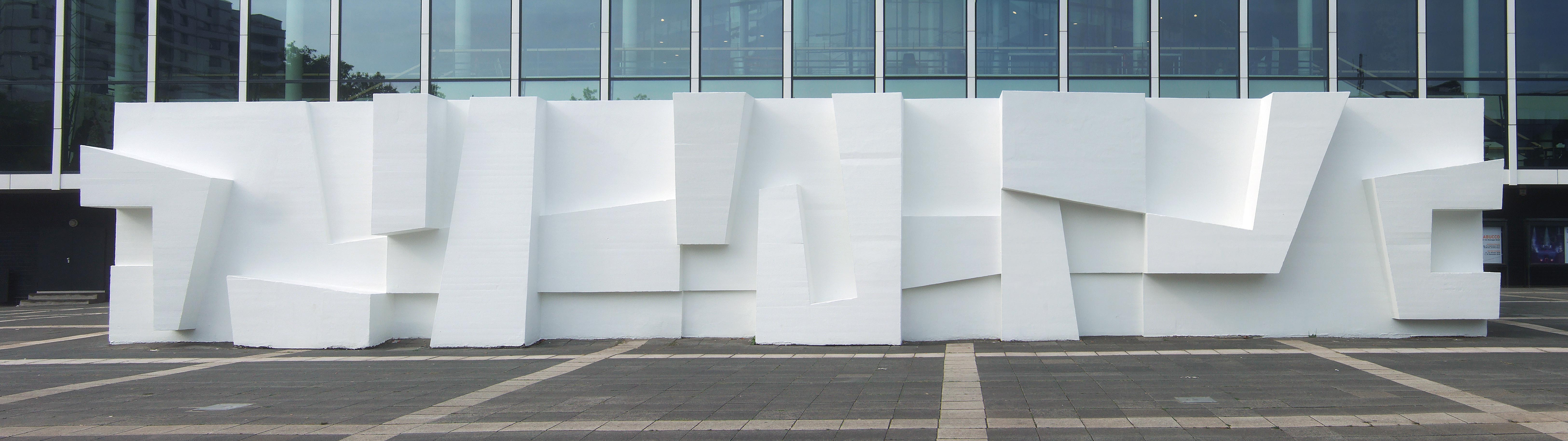
Concrete relief at the Musiktheater im Revier (1959)

From 1949 until 1959 he taught at the Central School of Art and Design in London. Whilst there he came into contact with Victor Pasmore and artists such as Kenneth Martin and Mary Martin who were pursuing the development of Constructivist ideas in Britain.

In the period 1950 to 1980 he was recognised as one of Britain's foremost abstract sculptors. His work was exhibited at the Venice Biennale in 1952 and again when he represented Britain with a retrospective occupying two galleries in 1962.

Some of his works are in the Tate Britain collection and the modern art in New York, Rome, and Turin, the São Paulo Museum of Modern Art and several other locations worldwide but he is virtually unknown in his home town. Apocalyptic Figure was commissioned by the Arts Council England for the Festival of Britain in 1951. Some of his large-scale sculptures can be seen at The Custom House, London, Heathrow Airport, Shell Mex House, London, and the Musiktheater im Revier, Gelsenkirchen, Germany. One of his works is in the Contemporary Art Museum of Macedonia.

He had a retrospective at the Northampton Art Gallery in 1971.
