= Romek Marber =

Polish-born British graphic designer (1925–2020)

- Born: 25 November 1925; Turek, Poland
- Died: 30 March 2020 (aged 94)
- Education: St. Martin’s School of Art; Royal College of Art
- Known for: Illustration, Design
- Notable work: Penguin Books Crime Series Covers; The Economist Covers

Romek Marber (25 November 1925 – 30 March 2020) was a Polish-born British graphic designer and academic known for his work illustrating the covers of Penguin Books. He retired in 1989, becoming a Professor Emeritus of Middlesex University.

== Biography ==
Marber was born in Turek, Poland on 25 November 1925. In 1939, he was deported to the Bochnia ghetto. In 1942, he was saved from being sent to the Belzec death camp by Sergeant Gerhard Kurzbach, the commander of the forced-labour workshop in Bochnia, credited with saving a large number of Jews during World War II and later recognized as a Righteous Among the Nations.

Marber arrived in Britain in 1946, where he was reunited with his father and brother. He applied for an education grant from The Committee for the Education of Poles in Great Britain, which had been established in the 1940s to support Polish servicemen and their families displaced by World War II), to study painting. However, he was advised by a member of the committee to apply for a course in Commercial art, which he enrolled upon at St. Martin’s School of Art in the early 1950s, and is where he met his wife, Sheila Perry (1928–1989), also a graphic designer; the couple married in 1958. About his time as a student, Marber said that he “spent time drawing and I regarded it as an exercise in observation, a visual note book.” He attended the Royal College of Art in 1953.

During the late 1950s, Marber designed covers for The Economist magazine. He stated that “the newsprint paper and the coarseness of the halftone printed by letterpress [of the Economist] suited the boldness of my work… Black with red is simple and dramatic.” When describing the process of designing the covers, Marber recalled the prolonged wait for editorial decisions to be made, and enjoying the speed of the illustration process.

In 1961, impressed by Marber’s covers for The Economist, Germano Facetti commissioned Marber to design covers for Simeon Potter's Our Language and Language in the Modern World. For the cover of Our Language, Marber recalls that he was “trying to convey that the language is English and evolving.”

== The 'Marber Grid' ==
Soon after these initial designs, Germano Facetti (art director at Penguin from 1960 to 1972) asked Marber to submit a proposal for a new cover approach for the Penguin Crime series. He was asked to do twenty titles in four months between June and October. Marber chose to retain the green colour for the series, though he used a 'fresher' shade, and kept the horizontal banding of the previous Edward Young designs. The image on Marber's covers occupies just over two-thirds of the space, while the title section at the top is divided into three bands carrying colophon/series name/price, the title and the author's name, with the type ranged left. The design was seen as so successful that Facetti adopted it, essentially unchanged, for both the blue Pelican and orange literature covers.

Penguin Books eventually decided that books in a series by the same author should have their own individual pictorial identification. Marber edited his original designs for Dorothy L. Sayers books by adding a small white figure, which he included in different postures on each cover. Marber became tired of designing crime fiction book covers. After taking a hiatus for a few years, he was asked to design the covers for six Angus Wilson novels. By then, Penguin Books had a new 'house style', where the 'Penguin' logo had to be placed in the top right hand corner of the cover.

== Retrospective Exhibition: Graphics ==
In 2013, The Minories, Colchester exhibited a retrospective of some of the graphic work designed by Marber for Penguin Books, The Economist, New Society, Town and Queen magazines, Nicholson’s London Guides, BBC Television, Columbia Pictures, the London Planetarium and others. It included enlarged versions of many of his book cover designs along with drawings and sketches documenting the Marber Grid, original spreads from magazines and original books. The exhibition was later shown at the University of Brighton and the Galicia Jewish Museum in Krakow.

== Personal life ==
Marber lived in Stisted, outside of Braintree, Essex and died there on March 30, 2020. He is survived by his long term partner, graphic designer Orna Frommer Dawson. He lost his belief in God as a teenager.

== Publications ==
In 2010, Marber published an autobiography of his experiences during World War Two: No Return: Journeys in the Holocaust (Richard Hollis; 1st edition, 2010).
