= Edward Wright (artist) =

English artist (1912–1988)

Edward Wright (16 July 1912 – 16 October 1988) was an English painter, typographer and graphic designer.

== Life and creative work ==
He was born on 16 July 1912, in Liverpool, in the family of Ecuadorian vice-consul (his mother was Chilean). He trained and worked a short period of time as an architect before being engaged in painting, drawing, print-making, and so called "commercial art". Beginning from 1942 he lived in London and worked in book publishing and advertising, and teaching graphic design at the Central School and at Chelsea School of Art. He refused to separate art from design. "Among his exceptional work is the lettering that he made for modern buildings, often managing both a specific design and an alphabet that could be applied more generally".

In the early 1950s, he was a member of the Independent Group, and taught at the Central School of Art with Anthony Froshaug, Nigel Henderson and Eduardo Paolozzi. He designed the catalogue for the exhibition This Is Tomorrow at the Whitechapel Gallery in 1956. In the late 1950s, he worked at Rathbone Books, essentially a book packaging firm, which had grown out of the wartime venture of Adprint.

Wright later taught at the London College of Printing, Cambridge University School of Architecture and the Royal College of Art. His architectural lettering work included the foundation stone for Churchill College, Cambridge (1961), and the Flaxman lettering and numbering system for New Scotland Yard's rotating sign (1968), Wright's original concept for which was that its "revolving triangular shape and reflective steel lettering was symbolic of the Met's constant vigilance in guarding our safety".

In 1963, Wright was a signatory of Ken Garland's First Things First manifesto. Edwin Taylor – friend and "companion of the road" told about Wright:

Edward was not the sort of typographer who regarded individual letter forms as a precious jewels to be polished and placed in a tiara. To Edward, each letter was a living form to be explored and shaped to suit a particular need or belief, in the same way an African carver would search out the core spirit and life-force in a piece of wood.
