= Anthony Hill (artist) =

English artist, mathematician (1930–2020)

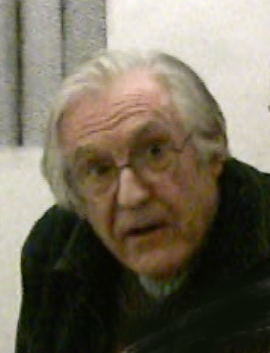
- Hill in 2019
- Born: 23 April 1930; Hampstead, London, U.K.
- Died: 13 October 2020 (aged 90); London, U.K.
- Other names: Achill Redo, Redo Doxford, Redo
- Education: Bryanston School, Saint Martin's School of Art, Central School of Arts and Crafts
- Occupations: Artist, writer, mathematician, teacher
- Movement: Constructionist, syntactic art
- Spouse: Yuriko Hill (née Kaetsu) (m. 1978)

Anthony Cedric Graham Hill (23 April 1930 – 13 October 2020), also known as Achill Redo, was an English painter, relief-maker, and mathematician.

He was originally a member of the post-World War II British art movement termed the Constructionist Group whose work was essentially in the international constructivist tradition.

== Biography ==
His fellow members in this group were Victor Pasmore, Adrian Heath, John Ernest, Kenneth Martin, Mary Martin, Gillian Wise and Stephen Gilbert.

Hill was born on 23 April 1930 in London, and studied at the Saint Martin's School of Art and the Central School of Art and Crafts between 1948 and 1951. He began painting in the style of Dada and Surrealism in 1948, but quickly moved on to geometric abstract idioms. He made his first relief in 1954 and abandoned painting for relief-making in 1956. One feature of these reliefs was the use of non-traditional materials such as industrial aluminium and Perspex.

His first one-man show of reliefs was held at the Institute of Contemporary Arts in 1958. He participated in exhibitions of abstract and constructivist art in the UK, Paris, Germany, Holland, Poland, Switzerland and the United States.

In 1978, he exhibited in the Arts Council's exhibition, Constructive Context, alongside a number of artists such as Jeffrey Steele and Peter Lowe who had begun working in a systematised constructive mode in the mid to late 1960s and came together in the Systems Group in December 1969. Hill, however, along with the Martins, declined membership of this group.

In 1983, the Hayward Gallery held a major retrospective exhibition of Hill's constructivist work.

Hill had a lifelong fascination with mathematics, and there were many mathematicians among his circle of acquaintances. Together with his colleague John Ernest, he made contributions to graph theory (crossing number) and in 1979, in recognition of a number of his mathematical papers, he was elected a member of the London Mathematical Society and made a visiting research associate in the Department of Mathematics at University College, London.

Although almost all his reliefs have an underlying mathematical structure or logic, he was always insistent that in his art, in his own words, "the mathematical thematic or mathematical process can only be a component: one is calculating or organising something which is clearly not mathematical." From the late 1980s onward, working in parallel with his systems-based work but in a very different mode, Hill exhibited dadaist pictures and collages under the pseudonym Achill Redo. The Tate Gallery, London has collections under both of the names Anthony Hill and Achill Redo.

A summary of Hill's life and constructivist work, together with that of the other British Constructivists, is found in Alastair Grieve's 2005 book.

== Personal life ==
Hill married Yuriko Kaetsu (1953–2013) in 1978. He died on 13 October 2020 at the age of 90.

== See also ==
- Constructionists
- Syntactic Art

== Sources ==
- Fowler, Alan. Essay in online Philosophy of Mathematics Education Journal No. 24, December 2009, 'A Rational Aesthetic'.
- Fowler, Alan, Essay, 'The Systems Group and its Constructivist Context', in exhibition catalogue 'A Rational Aesthetic', Southampton City Art Gallery, 2009.
- Grieve, Alastair (1983), Anthony Hill: A retrospective exhibition, Hayward Gallery, London
- Grieve, Alastair (2005), Constructed Abstract Art in England After the Second World War: A Neglected Avant-Garde, Yale University Press, ISBN 978-0-300-10703-6
- Harary, Frank and Hill, Anthony. On the number of crossings in a complete graph. Proceedings of the Edinburgh Math. Society (2), 13:333-338, 1962/1963.
- Hill, Anthony, editor Data: Directions in Art, Theory and Aesthetics, Faber and Faber. 1968. ISBN 978-0-571-08762-4
- Hill, Anthony, editor Duchamp: Passim, Craftsman House. 1994. ISBN 978-976-8097-78-1
- Buckman, David (1998), Artists in Britain Since 1945, Volume 1, Art Dictionaries, ISBN 0-953260-95-X
