= John Ernest =

American constructivist artist (1922–1994)

John Ernest (May 6, 1922 – July 21, 1994) was an American-born Constructivist abstract artist. He was born in Philadelphia in 1922. After living and working in Sweden and Paris from 1946 to 1951, he moved to London, where he lived and worked from 1951. As a mature student at Saint Martin's School of Art he came under the influence of Victor Pasmore and other proponents of constructivism. During the 1950s, Ernest exhibited with the British Constructivist (a.k.a. Constructionist) art movement. Ernest later became a core member of the Systems Group.

Ernest created both reliefs and free standing constructions. Several of his works are held at Tate Britain, including the Moebius Strip sculpture. He designed both a tower and a large wall relief at the International Union of Architects congress, South Bank, London, in 1961. The exhibition structure also housed works by several of the other British Constructivists.

Ernest had a lifelong fascination with mathematics that is reflected in his work and, together with constructivist artist Anthony Hill, made contributions to graph theory, studying crossing numbers of complete graphs.

Ernest was an atheist.
