= John Voelcker =

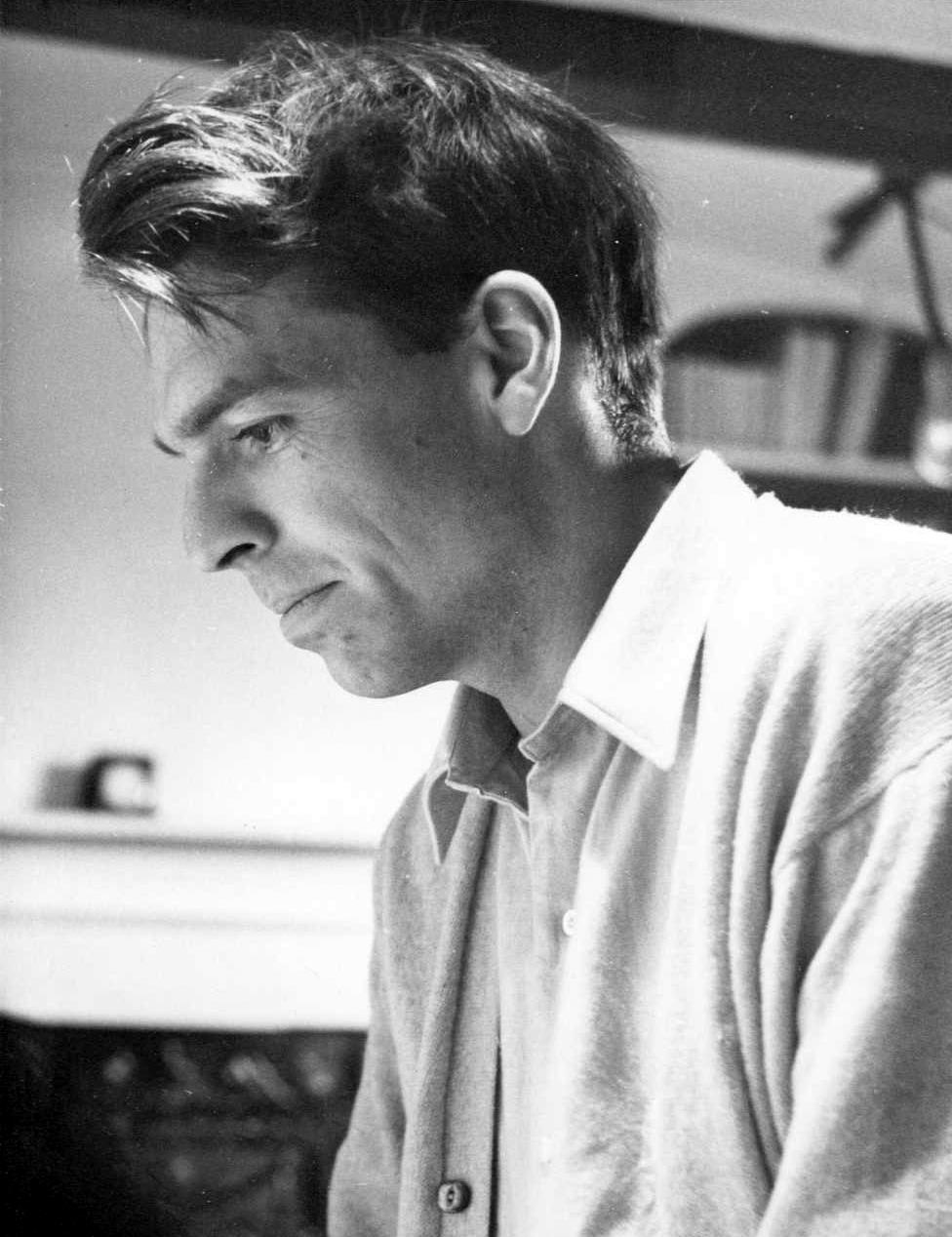
- John Voelcker in his studio in Kent
- Born: John Harold Westgarth Voelcker; 20 July 1927; Preston, Lancashire, England
- Died: 14 September 1972 (aged 45)
- Education: Abbotsholme School; Architectural Association School of Architecture
- Occupation: Architect
- Spouse: Ann Voelcker (née Lambert)
- Projects: The Zone; Lyttelton House; Swanscombe Urban District Council offices; Ashford Livestock Market

John Harold Westgarth Voelcker (20 July 1927 – 14 September 1972) was an English architect. A member of the Team 10 group of architects, he ran a small rural practice before his appointment first Professor of Architecture at the University of Glasgow.

== Family and education ==
Born in Preston, Lancashire, Voelcker was the son of an electrical engineer. He was educated at Abbotsholme School and the Architectural Association School of Architecture, London (AA). His time at the AA (1944–1952) was interrupted by three years of compulsory military service (1945–1948) followed by a brief period with the Architects' Co-Partnership. He met his wife, Ann (née Lambert), at the AA.

== The Zone ==
Voelcker's final AA design thesis, The Zone, undertaken in 1951–1952 with Pat Crooke and Andrew Derbyshire, was for a new settlement on a 72 square mile ‘micro region’ in Hertfordshire. Agriculture was a key component and the proposed mix of farming and light industry was much the same in the area of Kent where Voelcker was later to practice. The Zone's population was set at 72,000 – of whom 60,000 were accommodated in a series of multi-storey interlinked structures in the urban section at its centre. Reacting against the town/country separation created by Green Belt policies, the three students adopted an analytical framework in which qualitative differences between groups of people provide the differentiation in the Zone structure. Looking back, Voelcker was critical of many aspects of this huge project, describing the method of design and organisation as ‘very schematic’. Nevertheless, he claimed that the method showed that it was possible to find a method of work through which ‘any environment can be ordered, through which every part … has its own quality as a place'.

Following The Zone’s completion, the MARS (Modern Architectural Research) group asked its authors if they would present it as part of the UK’s contribution to CIAM (Congrès internationaux d’architecture moderne) IX at Aix the following year, 1953. Voelcker whittled down the 120 drawings to a ‘grid’ of 80 drawings (now held in the RIBA Drawings Collection) based on the format devised by the ASCORAL (Assemblée de constructeurs pour une rénovation architecturale) group. Nearly 25 years later, four years after Voelcker's early death, the architectural critic Reyner Banham cited The Zone as the earliest example of the relationship between academe and megastructure. He observed that, because it was largely concerned with agriculture, not all of the project could be seen as ‘proto-megastructure’ – although a substantial part of the urban portion was contained in a large and complex structure.

== Architectural practice ==
As students, Voelcker and his wife spent four months with BBPR in Milan, assisting on furniture design. After qualifying as an architect, he joined Derbyshire at Farmer and Dark to work on the design of electricity generating stations, mainly the Marchwood Power Station, near Southampton. Uncomfortable with the firm's approach, the pair resigned and Voelcker started to practice on his own account in London on a project for a house in Highgate, featured in Architectural Design, but unbuilt.

In 1954 the couple moved to Kent, where Ann came from, settling in one half of a modest eighteenth-century house in the village of Staplehurst. Work was limited, consisting mainly of the modernisation of agricultural dwellings (providing, with grant aid from seven local rural district councils, basic kitchen and bathroom facilities), conversions and the occasional dwelling. In 1957 the government's Farm Improvement Scheme provided direct grant aid toward the construction of farm buildings. Later, this aid was extended to fruit enterprises under the Horticultural Improvement Scheme. The introduction of these grants provided Voelcker with a considerable amount of agricultural work.

In 1962 the Voelckers moved to a much larger, former farmhouse at Sutton Valence, with a magnificent view over the Weald of Kent. Here, the practice expanded to include four assistant architects and some support staff. Between 1959 and 1968, there was an average of about 30 jobs a year and, at its height, around 1963, nearly double that. Commissions for other building types gradually came in – a primary school, two offices and a social housing scheme.

By 1965, the practice was in difficulties. A project for Maidstone Rural District Council offices was never built and the government's agricultural improvement programmes had, locally, run their course. The new government's Selective Employment Tax hit architects hard and the remaining architectural staff left the practice. Voelcker was unwell and the practice became unviable.

=== Buildings ===
Despite the large number of projects undertaken, few were of architectural significance. Among these were:

Lyttelton House, Arkley, 1958. A courtyard house designed for the jazz musical artist Humphrey Lyttelton including a "splendidly witty" pop art mural by John McHale, which was the subject of the first successful appeal against a Planning Authority's refusal – on aesthetic grounds – of permission to build. Featured in Reyner Banham's The New Brutalism: ethic or aesthetic?. Demolished in the 1990s for a much larger house.

Blackwall Farm, Hinxhill. Typical of the many farms upgraded by Voelcker. Old barns were invariably retained as feed stores and new long span sheds constructed for wintering cattle. Today derelict – no longer in use as a farm.

Junior School, Staplehurst. Among Team 10 architect colleagues, it was admired by Ralph Erskine but dismissed by the Smithsons. School expanded and hall roof altered.

Swanscombe Urban District Council offices. One of two offices employing a structural bay system based around the smallest office cell. Presented to Team 10 at Royaumont in 1962, it was not well received. The council was later abolished and the site of the second office was redeveloped – both buildings demolished.

Livestock Market, Ashford. A ten-sided building of concrete block and plywood construction with raked seating below an innovative roof. Demolished for the Eurostar railway system.

== This is Tomorrow ==
In 1956 Voelcker collaborated with the artists Richard Hamilton and John McHale as Group Two on the seminal This is Tomorrow exhibition at London's Whitechapel gallery. Reyner Banham later asserted that Group Two's installation was ‘the first Pop-Art manifestation to be seen in any art gallery anywhere in the world’. The art historian John-Paul Stonard has claimed that ‘Although Voelcker played an important role, the combined interests of McHale and Hamilton largely determined Group Two’s contribution.’ Construction drawings for the screens upon which the displays were mounted exist but nothing is known about the evolution of the intriguing grid which formed the basis for their disposition.

== Team 10 ==
Between 1946 and 1949, Voelcker was involved in CIAM and the emergence of Team 10. As a student, he assisted at both CIAM VII at Bergamo in 1949 and CIAM VIII at Hoddesdon in 1951. As a member of the English CIAM group, he presented The Zone at Aix in 1953 and contributed village housing proposals in 1955 and 1957. He presented the Lyttelton House at CIAM's final meeting, at Otterlo in 1959. Between Aix and Otterlo, he was very active in the discussions and declarations that brought about the foundation of Team 10. His only presentation to a Team 10 meeting was at Royaumont in 1962 where his Ashford Regional Study and office designs were discussed.

Voelcker's significance in Team 10 has been debated ever since Alison Smithson deleted his name from the revised edition of the Team 10 Primer. He is now regarded as a ‘participant’ – rather than as a ‘member of the ‘inner circle’ or ‘incidental participant or ‘guest’ – and is described as an important initiator and contributor to Team 10 in its early stages. He was particularly close to Giancarlo De Carlo and Aldo van Eyck, who described him as a ‘Founding member and quintessential Team X thinker’.

== Writing and research ==
Between 1953 and 1960 Voelcker contributed many articles and reviews to, among others, the Architects’ Journal, Architectural Design, Architectural Review and Architect’s Year Book. The subject matter ranged from domestic oil equipment to floor assemblies, farm buildings to playgrounds and from Team 10 meetings to the Philips pavilion at the Brussels World Fair in 1958. This wide-ranging subject matter reflected his concern never to be seen as a specialist – a position he expanded in a lecture, 'Technics of Architecture’, at the Architectural Association in 1966.

In September 1960 the Architectural Review published Voelcker's critical review of contemporary farm buildings. This was intended to be followed with the results of an investigation by a consortium formed by Voelcker to review the design, fabrication and construction of agricultural buildings. The results were never published.

== Teaching ==
Voelcker taught part-time at the Medway College of Art, Rochester (now part of the Kent Institute of Art and Design),1954-56. He was also a part-time studio master at the AA School in the early 60s, occasionally tutored at Cambridge and became Director of Fourth and Fifth Year Studies at the AA in 1965. With the decline of his practice, he also taught a semester at the University of California, Los Angeles in 1966. In 1969 he was appointed as first Professor of Architecture in the University of Glasgow, at what was to become the Mackintosh School. His health continued to decline and he died, aged 45, in 1972.

== Archival material ==
The archives of both the Architectural Association and the Whitechapel Gallery hold drawings by John Voelcker, donated by his son, Adam Voelcker.

== Assessment ==
John Voelcker was unusual among his contemporaries in not being part of a metropolitan scene. Instead, he worked in the countryside where, as he explained to Aldo van Eyck, his aim was ‘to build an efficient but not very exciting practice because I am more interested in architecture as a social necessity than as an art’. Of all his projects and buildings, it is the unbuilt megastructural Zone that he designed with Derbyshire and Crooke that he is best remembered for. Reyner Banham dedicated Megastructure: urban futures of the recent past to Voelcker, the ‘architect and teacher, who first introduced me to the idea of megastructure’. Van Eyck, who also dedicated a publication to him stated that ‘He was urbanistically the best of the Team 10 thinkers, by far. He knew a lot, he was interesting, inclined and open’.
