= J. D. H. Catleugh =

British artist

J D H Catleugh (April 16, 1920 – January 7, 2009) was a British abstract artist whose career began in the 1950s and continued until his death in 2009.

== Timeline of career ==
J. D. H. Catleugh was born on April 16, 1920. He was originally named King's Lynn and was the son of the late John Harwood Catleugh. In 1949, after serving in World War II, he became qualified as an architect and created a series of Perspex and wood reliefs in 1949 - 50. His series of "Space/Time" paintings was strongly influenced by a Jackson Pollock exhibition he attended in Venice. In 1951, he designed sets for Picasso’s play, Desire Caught by Tail, at the Watergate Theatre in London. He began designing furniture in 1952 and, a year later, was the winner of the 1953 Furniture Makers Guild, Coronation Design Competition. The accompanying textile designs were produced by David Whitehead Ltd. He created a series of collages in 1953-54. For the next five years (1954-59), he did a series of relief paintings on plaster, followed by a Scottish landscape series in 1959–62. Catleugh lived in London, England, from 1988 until his death in 2009.

== Exhibitions ==
One-man exhibitions in 1953 and 1954 at Gimpel Fils.

Group exhibitions:- 1951 British Abstract Art, Gimpel Fils, The Redfern Gallery, Summer Exhibition, The Mirror and the Square, A.I.A. - 1952:- Tomorrow’s Furniture, I.C.A., Gimpel Fils, Summer Exhibition. - 1953:- Bradford, 60th Spring Exhibition, Gimpel Fils, Collectors’ Choice, Collectors’ Items from Artist's Studios, I.C.A., Paintings into Textiles, I.C.A. - 1954 Of Light and Colour, Gimpel Fils.1956 - This is Tomorrow, Whitechapel, London. - 1988 Reflections of the Fifties, England & Co.

His work was included in British Abstract Art at Gimpel Fils in 1951 and was displayed alongside the works of British abstract artist John Milnes-Smith, in that same year they also exhibited at The Mirror and the Square organised by the A.I.A. J D H Catleugh was part of what Herbert Read described as the ‘Tachiste Tornado’ of the 1950s; ( Herbert Read-Art Since 1945, Thames & Hudson, Chapter 7) and he showed a highly refined sense of organisation in his work, perhaps a reflection of Catleugh's early architectural training.

In 1949 J D H Catleugh, influenced by Jackson Pollock, became fascinated by the possibilities of the ‘drip and pour’ technique. He eliminated his own colour mixtures and worked/poured directly from the paint manufacturer's tin. The result is a rhythmic and polychromatic ‘net-work of trails which loop, entwine and lose themselves in an indecipherable complexity’-(Review of Gimpel Fils exhibition, Manchester Guardian, 19-1-1953 ) These ‘Space/Time’ paintings may remind us of ‘electrons around a nucleus’ or ‘the trial of a jet plane‘,-(Colin St John Wilson, Notes on paintings by J D H Catleugh, January 1953 ) but they have no subjects as such. Titles like Space-Time Configuration and Bi-planar Structure remind us that these are products of a post atomic world and as contemporary in 2007 as they were then.

October 1953 Painting onto Textiles exhibition at the ICA organised by Hans Juda, editor of The Ambassador to promote textile designs by contemporary painters. Three designs from this exhibition were put into production by David Whitehead Ltd, these same textile designs were included in Artist's Textiles in Britain 1945–1970 exhibition at the Fine Art Society 2003.

By the mid-1950s J D H Catleugh, moving towards Victor Passmore and the British Constructionists, was working on a series of paper collages. Vertical black stripes were cut and pasted down, their orderly rows broken only by the addition of strips of coloured paper. Oswell Blakeston described them as having the effect of ‘looking through slats at a confetti world’’-(Oswell Blakeston, Popular Art, Art News & Review, 30-10-1954 )

In 1956 the Tate Gallery exhibition, Modern Art in the United States, devoted one gallery to abstract expressionism. It was followed in 1957 by the landmark Metavisual Tachiste Abstract exhibition at the Redfern Gallery, which registered the influence of the Americans. This American impact was strengthened by the 1959 exhibition of abstract expressionism, New American Painting, also at the Tate Gallery.

In 1959–62 his direction and style changed, using ‘oils and a knife’ his series of landscapes, moves closer to the lyrical abstractions of the painters of St Ives, such as Peter Lanyon. Catleugh quotes; ‘As Lawrence Alloway said of St Ives‘, ‘the landscape is so nice that nobody can quite bring themselves to leave it out of their art’-(Lawrence Alloway, Nine Abstract Artists, Alec Tiranti Ltd 1954 )

1984 - A series of Red/Black paintings started around the time of the 40th anniversary of the Normandy Landings, also many painful images were being shown on TV of the war in Bosnia and elsewhere, these led to the red/black figurative paintings which are often of just a single figure, sometimes reminiscent of a/the crucifixion which after all is the ultimate symbol of pain.

In 1988 - Reflections of the Fifties a two-man exhibition with John Milnes-Smith, whose career in the 1950s ran parallel with that of Catleugh's, although each had a different response to post-war directions in abstract art, this exhibition was focussing on two artists whose work reflects a post war world, and was like a time capsule opening to reveal directions in British abstract art of the nineteen fifties and early sixties.

Catleughs's overall career, was that predominately of an architect and who painted purely for the love, passion and the expression in which art can give and bring. He was a world-renowned expert in the works of William De Morgan and was the author of William Morris Tiles (1983) and many articles on nineteenth century and Islamic tiles. His interest in two-dimensional patterns extends to textiles particularly those from India and Indonesia, of which he had a small collection, in addition he was a devoted collector of William De Morgan's Tiles of which he had an extensive collection.

He became the third chairman of the De Morgan Foundation in 1996 and during his term 'The De Morgan Centre for the Study of 19th Century Art and Society' was set up in Wandsworth, London. From 2002, until its closure in June 2014, this exhibited a large collection of the ceramics of William De Morgan and the paintings of Evelyn De Morgan together with considerable archive material.
