= Adrian Heath (painter) =

British painter

Adrian Heath (1920–1992) was a British painter.

Heath was born in Burma and attended Bryanston School in Dorset, southern England. In 1938, he studied art under Stanhope Forbes at Newlyn. In 1939 and 1945–47, he attended the Slade School of Art. In the Second World War, he served in the RAF as a tail gunner in a Wellington bomber but spent almost the entire war as a prisoner of war at Stalag 383. During this period he became friends with and taught fellow POW Terry Frost to paint. Limited by their imprisonment they made paint by grounding up earth pigments in oil from tins of sardines provided by the Red Cross.

In 1949 and 1951, he visited St Ives, Cornwall, where he met Ben Nicholson. In the early 1950s, he was also associated with Victor Pasmore and Anthony Hill. As such he became the main link between the emerging St Ives School and British Constructivism. He was also influenced by D'Arcy Thompson. In 1953 Heath published Abstract Painting: its Origins and Meaning, a slim but perceptive volume appraising the development of abstraction by the early moderns.

He exhibited at the Musée Carcassonne in 1948, and at the Redfern Gallery, London, from 1953, together with other galleries in London. His work is in the collections of the Tate Gallery and the Hirshhorn Museum, Washington DC.

Heath taught at Bath Academy of Art (1955–76) and the University of Reading (1980–85). He was artist in residence at the University of Sussex in 1969 and a senior fellow at the Glamorgan Institute of Higher Education, Wales (1977–80).

Heath was a member of 56 Group Wales from 1978 to 1982.

Adrian Heath painted abstract and semi-abstract pictures in oils and acrylic paints. He was also a collagist and constructivist.

Adrian and his wife Corinne were also campaigners to preserve the character and heritage of Fitzrovia where they lived for many years. Adrian and Corinne were founder members of the campaign group The Charlotte Street Association who fight to increase social housing and preserve the character the area around Charlotte Street and in Fitzrovia.
