= Sarah Jackson (artist) =

American-Canadian artist (1924–2004)

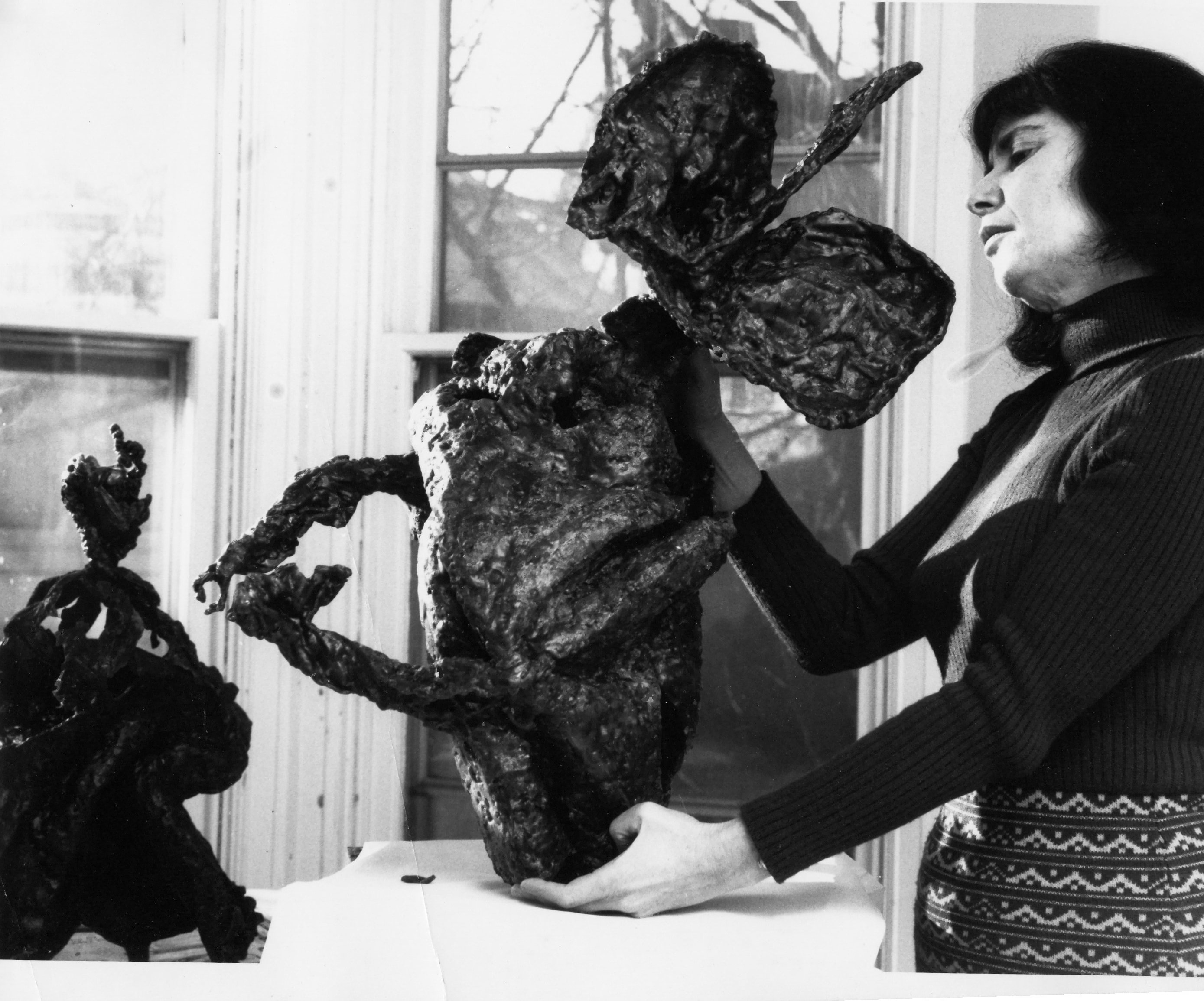
- Sarah Jackson in her studio with wax Mythological Figure II, 1972
- Born: Sarah Jeanette Sherman; 1924; Detroit, Michigan
- Died: 2004 (aged 79–80); Halifax, Canada
- Known for: digital art, mail art, sculptor, bookwork art
- Partner: Anthony Jackson

Sarah Jeanette Jackson, (née Sherman) (1924 – 2004) was an American-Canadian artist. Jackson first became known for her sculptures and drawings, and then for her photocopy and digital art. She was an early user of the photocopier to make art, and used this practice to embrace mail art.

== Biography ==
She was born in Detroit in 1924. She studied at the University of London and Wayne State University. She graduated in 1948 and left for Mexico City where she taught English at Mexico City College and began her life as an artist.

She arranged international copy art festivals and mail art exhibitions, believing that this could lead to an ideal democratic interchange between artists and the public, without regard to political, economic or cultural barriers.

Jackson documented these with published catalogues including the 1985 International Mail/Copier Art Exhibition catalogue which received an award of excellence from the Art Museum Association of America. The assembled works were displayed both in London in 1987 and at the Canadian Museum of Civilization in 1992 and became part of the collection of the Canadian Postal Museum.

Jackson also contributed to many art exhibitions abroad including two in Italy that were organized at Giuseppe Perotti School in Turin, 1987 and 1990, and subsequently collaborated with Lidia Chiarelli and British poet Aeronwy Thomas in developing Immagine & Poesia, a project that a few years later became the international artistic literary movement. During this period she also used copiers to create bookworks. From 1995 on, she worked exclusively with computers. Jackson's last retrospective exhibition titled Spirit Journey / Bodies of Work at the Art Gallery of Nova Scotia in 2001 included bronze sculptures, ink drawings, mixed media assemblages, photocopier art and digital paintings.

Jackson died in 2004 in Halifax.

== Collections ==
Her work is in the collection of the National Gallery of Canada, the National Art Library at the Victoria and Albert Museum, London the Musée national des beaux-arts du Québec the National Museum of Women in the Arts and the Smithsonian American Art Museum.

== Gallery ==
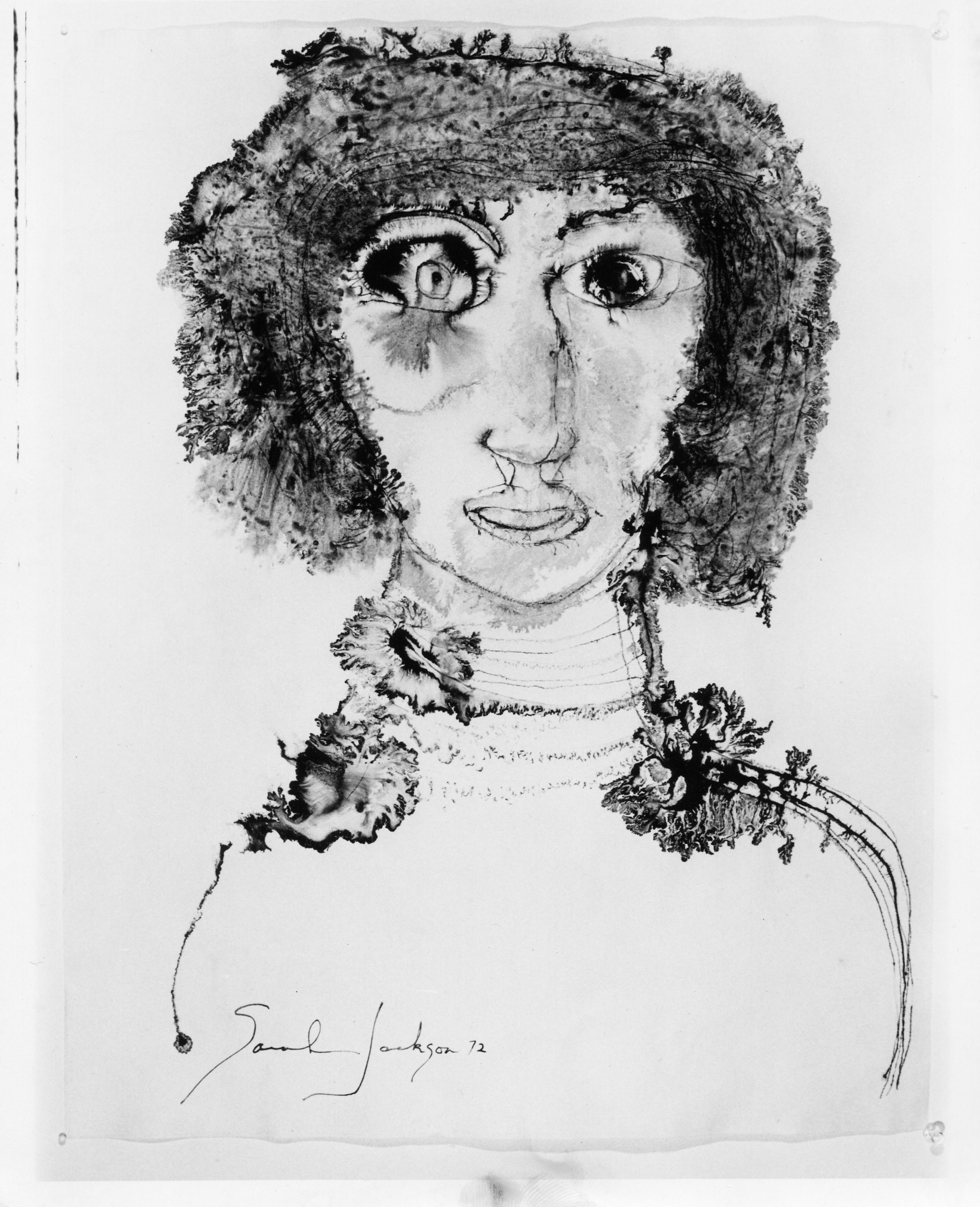
Woman, 1972

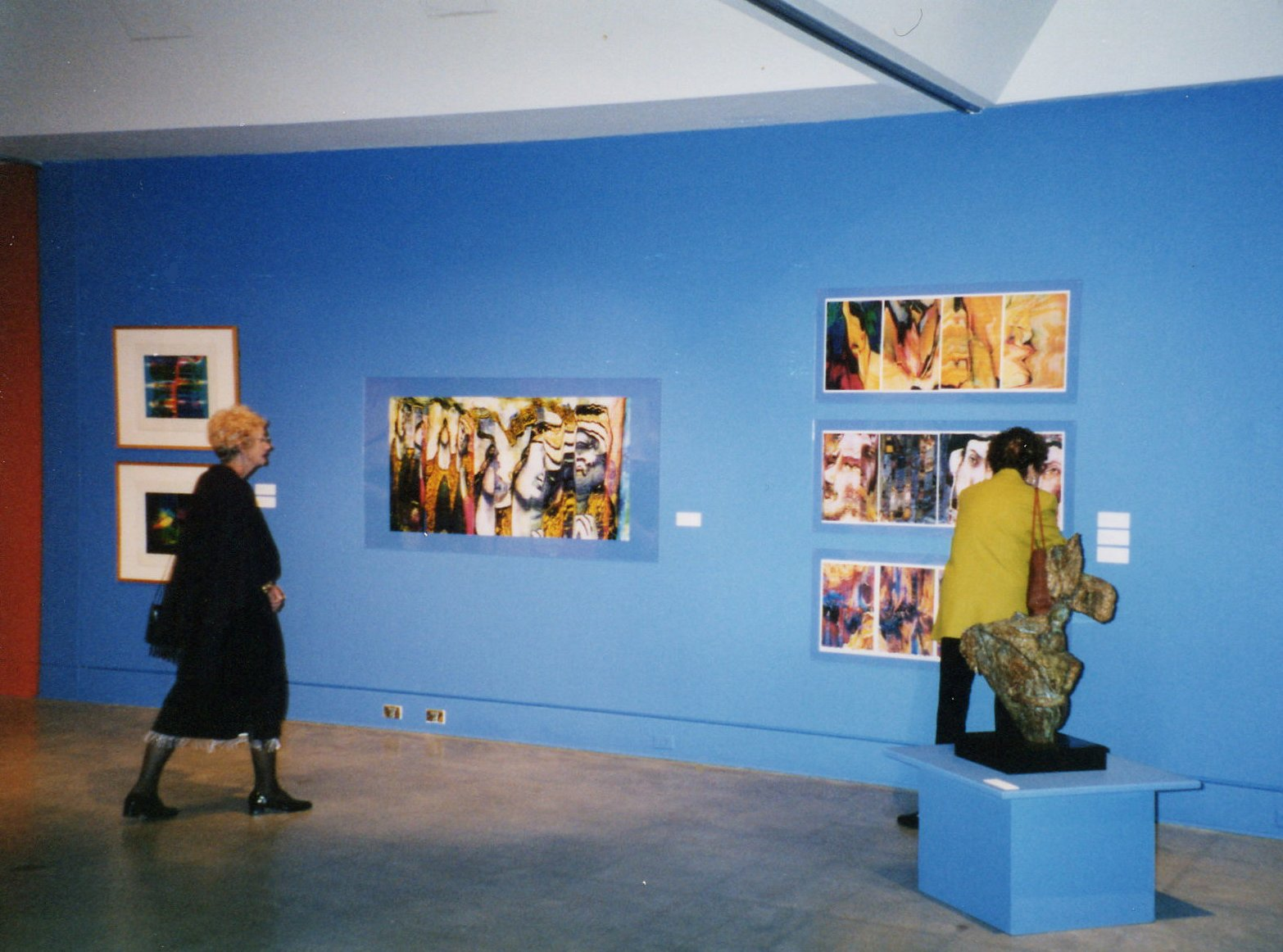
Copier art at 2001 retrospective exhibition

== Bibliography ==
- Robert Melville, "The New Sculptors", Harper's Bazaar, 46: 33-34. January, 1952.
- Pierre Rouve, "Sculpture de Sarah Jackson", Prisme des arts, 6: 42. November, 1956.
- Guy Robert, "Eros et humour chez Sarah Jackson", Vie des Arts, 20: 30-31. Spring, 1975.
- Tom Coleman, "Xerox Art is No Copycat", Globe and Mail, Toronto. July 3, 1976.
- Peter Bromley, "Sarah Jackson", Visual Arts News, 1: 6-7. Fall 1977.
- Sarah Jackson. Doomsday Studios with the assistance of the National Film Board of Canada. video, 10 minutes. 1980.
- Donna Smyth, "Sarah Jackson's Eyeconography", Atlantic Provinces Book Review, 12:16. May–June, 1985.
- Canadian Who's Who, Toronto: University of Toronto Press. 1996.
- David Liss, "Copy Art: What happened to the Pioneers?", Artfocus, 4: 20-23. Winter, 1996.
