= Germano Facetti =

Italian graphic designer

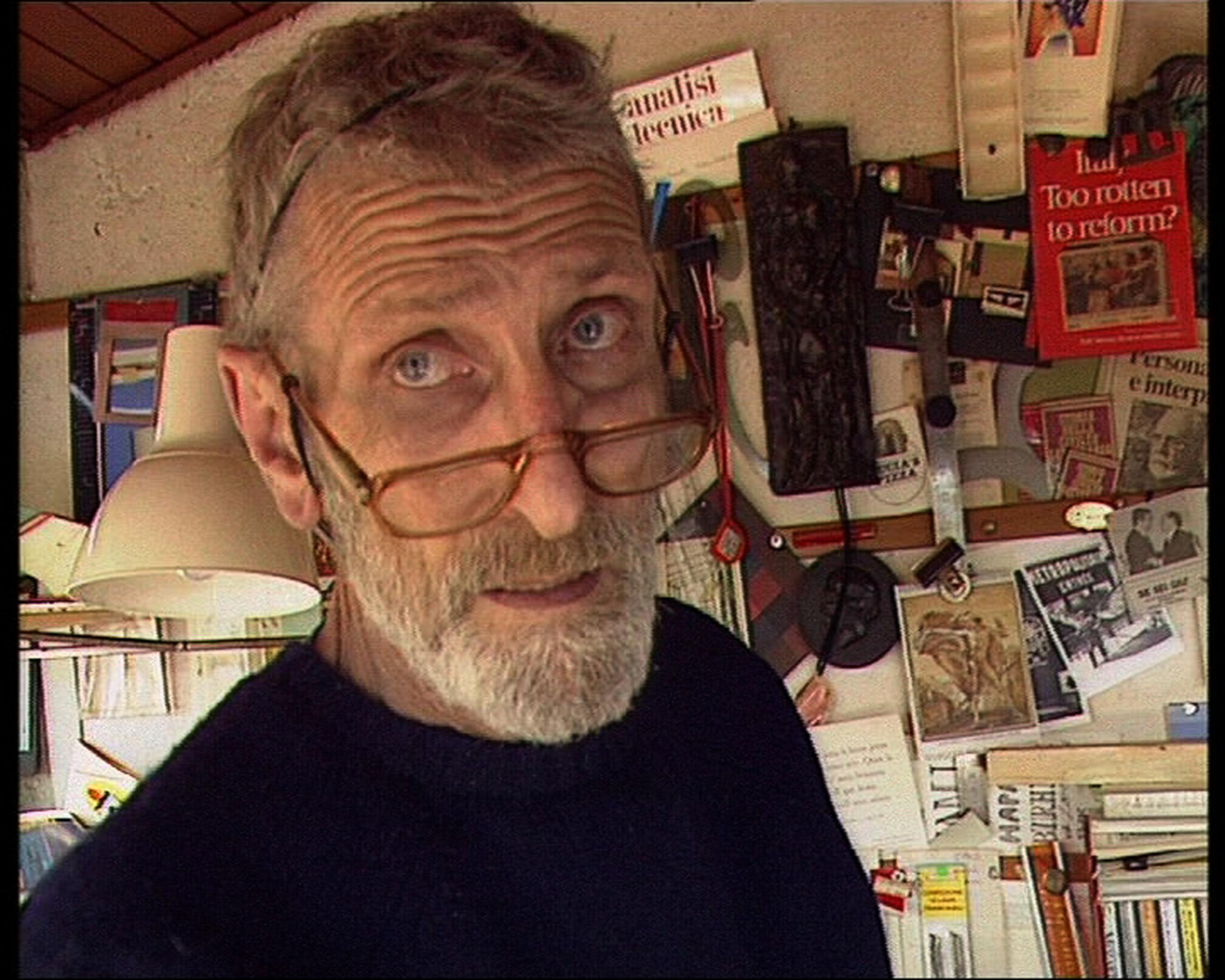
Germano Facetti

Germano Facetti (5 May 1928 – 8 April 2006) was an Italian graphic designer who headed design at Penguin Books from 1962 to 1971.

== Biography ==
Born in Milan, Facetti was arrested in 1943, age 17, for putting up anti-Fascist posters. He was deported to Mauthausen as a forced labourer, where he met the architect Ludovico Belgiojoso. At the end of the World War II, Belgiojoso invited Facetti to practice in his studio in Milan.

He moved to London in the early 1950s where he took evening classes in typography at the Central School of Art & Design, and participated in the seminal 1956 exhibition of pop art, This is Tomorrow, at the Whitechapel Gallery.

By the late 1950s he was art director at Aldus Books and working as an interior designer, working briefly in Paris. It was his interior for the Poetry Bookshop in Soho that inspired the director of Penguin, Allen Lane, to invite him to join as the art director in 1960. Facetti was instrumental in redesigning the Penguin line, introducing phototypesetting, the 'Marber grid', offset-litho printing and photography to their paperback covers. Known for his standard of consistency amongst Penguin's covers, Facetti implemented variations of typographic framework that would be used for each cover. Only using the typefaces Standard and Helvetica, he used these sans serif fonts in the same sizes and positions for the author, book title, and series name amongst all of his covers. This was a result of his influence from Swiss typography.

Facetti was also responsible for the black cover designs of the Penguin Classics series from 1963. He recruited a number of leading designers of the day, and one of his important achievements for Penguin was to impose a consistently high standard of cover design.

In November 1971, Facetti traveled to Chile to collaborate in the formation of the School of Graphic Design at the Pontifical Catholic University of Valparaíso.

After leaving Penguin in 1972 Facetti worked for the publishing company Fabbri in Milan. He was invited to join the team by his friend and editorial director Giorgio Giulio Savorelli, with whom he had worked in the past. He collaborated with Chris Marker on the 1962 groundbreaking experimental new wave film, La jetée.

== Publications ==
While at Penguin, Facetti wrote an account of his design philosophy, Identity kits: A Pictorial Survey of Visual Signals. It was published in 1967 and reprinted in 1971 and 2007.

== Death ==
Facetti died on 8 April 2006, aged 79.
