= Mary Martin (artist) =

British artist

Mary Adela Martin
- Born: Mary Balmford; 16 November 1907; Folkestone, United Kingdom
- Died: 9 October 1969 (aged 61); London, United Kingdom
- Known for: Painting, Sculpture
- Movement: Abstract Art
- Spouse: Kenneth Martin (m. 1930)

Mary Adela Martin (née Balmford) (1907–1969) was a British artist best known for constructed abstract art and for her collaborations with her husband Kenneth Martin.

== Biography ==
Martin née Balmford was born on 16 November 1907 in Folkestone, United Kingdom. She studied at Goldsmiths' College, London from 1925 to 1929 and at the Royal College of Art from 1929 to 1932 where she met and married Kenneth Martin in 1930. She exhibited at the A.I.A. from 1934, mainly as a still-life and landscape painter, using her maiden name. During the war Mary taught drawing, design and weaving at Chelmsford School of Art from 1941 to 1944 but gave this up when she became pregnant with her first child.

Martin moved towards pure abstraction in the late 1940s painting her first abstract picture in 1950, made her first reliefs in 1951 and her first free-standing construction in 1956. Martin and her husband collaborated on the Environment section of the seminal exhibition This Is Tomorrow. Martin participated in group exhibitions of constructed art in England and abroad, notably Konkrete Kunst, Zürich 1960, and Experiment in Constructie, Stedelijk Museum, Amsterdam, 1962. Martin designed a screen for the Musgrave Park Hospital in Belfast (1957), reliefs for the Orient Line's S.S. Oriana (1960) and a wall construction for the University of Stirling.

Martin was the joint winner of the 1969 John Moores Painting Prize along with Richard Hamilton. She was the first woman to receive that prize.

Martin died on 9 October 1969 in London.

In 1984 the Tate Gallery held a retrospective of her work. In 2007 the Camden Arts Centre held an exhibition of Mary and Kenneth Martin's work.
