= Kenneth Martin (English painter) =

Constructionist sculptor (1905–1984)

Kenneth Laurence Martin OBE (13 April 1905, Sheffield – 18 November, 1984, London), was an English painter and sculptor who, with his wife Mary Martin and Victor Pasmore, was a leading figure in the revival of Constructionism.

== Life ==
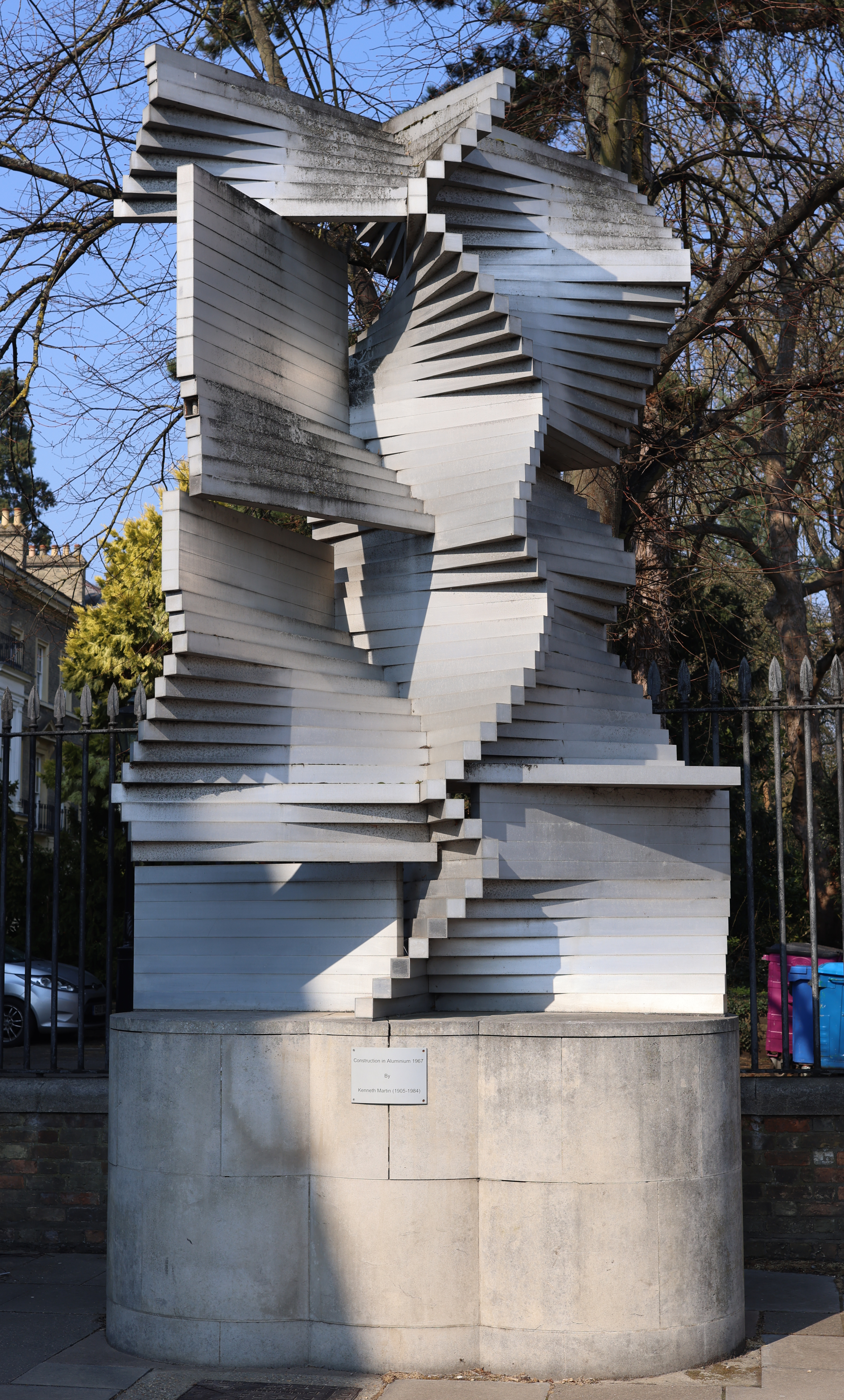
Construction In Aluminium 1967

Kenneth Martin’s father was a former soldier who worked in Sheffield as a coal clerk and supported his son at Sheffield School of Art during 1921-3. After his father's death, Martin worked in the city as a graphic designer, occasionally studying at the art school part-time. He won a scholarship to the Royal College of Art in 1929-32 and there met Mary Balmford, whom he married in 1930. During the 1930s he painted in a naturalistic style and was associated with the Euston Road School along with Victor Pasmore. During the 1940s Martin's work began to emphasise elements of structure and design until 1948–49 when, following Pasmore's lead, it became purely abstract.

From 1946-51 Martin was teaching at St John's Wood Art School and afterwards was a visiting teacher at Goldsmith's School of Art until 1968. In 1951 also, he and his wife produced Broadsheet 'devoted to abstract art', which contained reproductions of their work and essays defining their new direction. Other essays explaining his ideas followed over the years, notably in the journals Architectural Design and Studio International. His first sculptural commission was "Twin Screws" for the 6th congress of the International Union of Architects in London in 1961 and other public art commissions followed. As well as works among national exhibits at the 4th San Marino Biennale (1963) and the 8th Tokyo Biennale (1965), he was represented in such surveys of contemporary trends as "This is Tomorrow" (Whitechapel Gallery, 1956), and the international touring exhibitions of "British Constructivist Art" (1961), Konstructive Kunst (1969), "Aspects of Abstract Painting in Britain" (1974), "Recent British Art" (British Council, 1977), and "Pier + Ocean: construction in the art of the seventies" (Arts Council, 1980). Following his death in 1984, his work continued to be exhibited internationally and in solo retrospectives.

Among the honours he received was a gold medal at the 20th International Congress of Artists and Critics in 1965 and the OBE in 1971. In 1976 he was given an honorary doctorate at the Royal College of Art.

== Work ==
Though there was a tendency towards abstraction in British post-war art, it often had a representational base, as in the sculptures of Lynn Chadwick or, at first, Martin's own painting Chalk Farm of 1949. But Martin swiftly followed this with the purer abstraction of lines and geometrical shapes. Identifying this transition in his Broadsheet essay, Martin explained that "what is generally termed 'abstract' is not to be confused with the abstraction from nature and its reduction and distortion to a pictorial form...Abstract painting is the result of a creative process exactly the opposite of abstraction." Because such art was constructed according to scientific or mathematical models, the Martins turned to making reliefs and moving sculptures which they called "constructionist", although acknowledging their link with earlier European Constructivism.

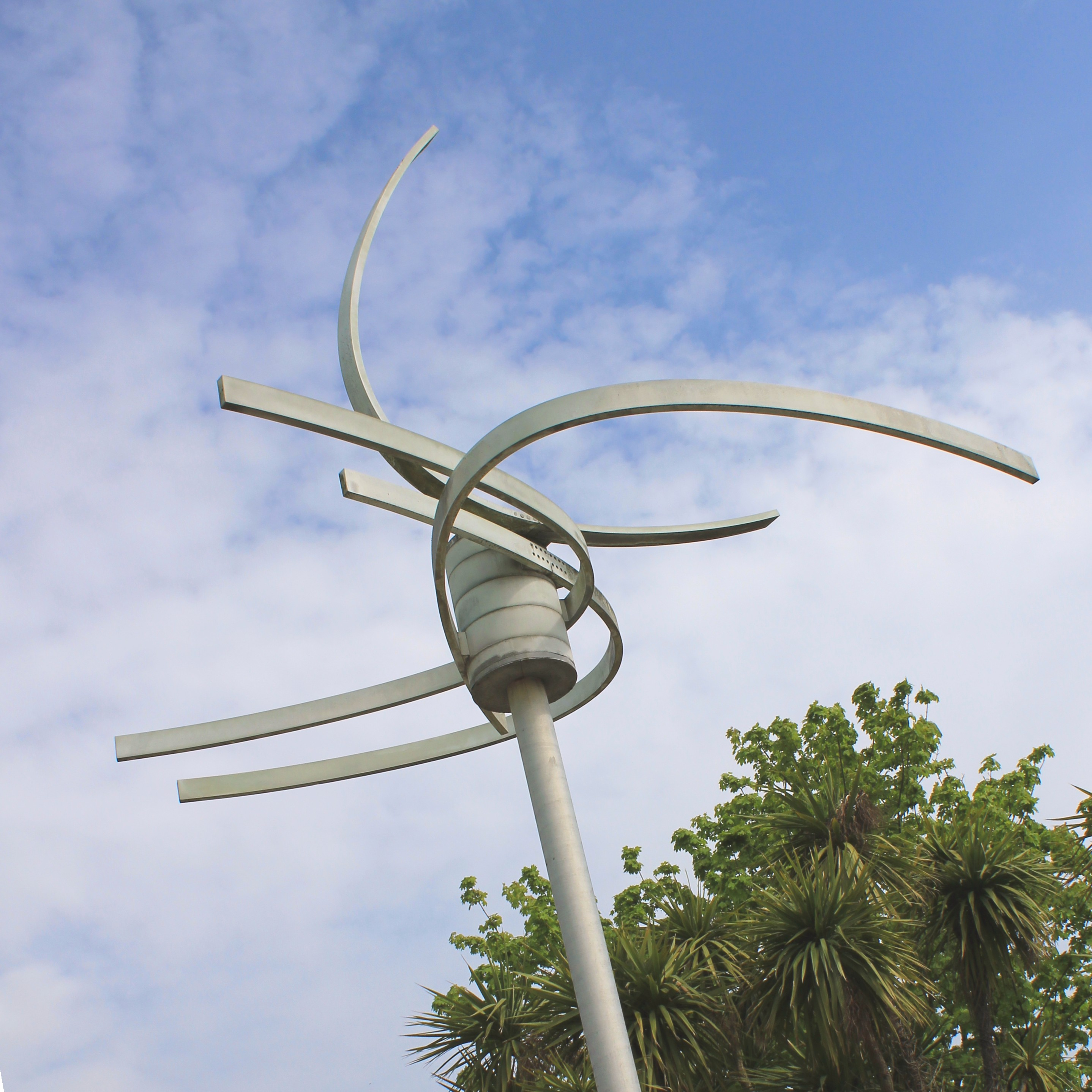
Kinetic Monument (1977), outside the LC Leisure Centre in Oystermouth Road, Swansea, Wales

Kenneth Martin's Screwmobile of 1953, with its brass strips mounted in helical form, is considered a particularly representative example of that approach. Later static constructions with implied kinetic rhythms included the small standing Oscillation at the Whitworth Art Gallery and the monumental Construction in Aluminium for the Cambridge University Department of Engineering, both dated 1967. As he was theorising at the time that he created these works, "An organized series of events, which the constructing process becomes, defines the whole character of a work. The mental and the physical are tied together in the succession of events. So that practical things, through the understanding of their nature, can result in an imaginative edifice." Diversifying from such works, he developed his adjustable Rotary Rings (1968) and the curved narrow blades of his motorised Kinetic Monument (1977).

After 1969, Martin began work on the seemingly endless process of his Chance and Order series of drawings and prints, exploiting their direction, linear thickness and colour, so that "not only does chance define position, it gives sequence also. The points of intersection on a grid of squares are numbered and the numbers are written on small cards and then picked at random. A line is made between each successive pair of numbers as they are picked out…Subsequently, varying the way a time sequence of drawing the lines was used, or changing the nature of the grid, could yield a succession of drawings of a variety of invention within the range of one set of pairings."

The joint exhibition of the work of Kenneth and Mary Martin mounted at the Tate St Ives in 2007 was their first joint public-gallery exhibition since 1971. Focusing on his mobiles as well as the Chance and Order series, it enabled restoration of his 1955 homage to Alexander Calder, the Mobile Reflector of 1955, which had become buckled and unbalanced between exhibitions over the years.

== Bibliography ==
- Alastair Grieve, "Constructivism after the Second World War", in British Sculpture in the Twentieth Century, Whitechapel Art Gallery 1981
- Mary Martin Kenneth Martin, An Arts Council touring exhibition 1970-71
- Kenneth Martin, Recent Works, Waddington and Tooth Galleries catalogue, June 1978
