= Andrew Derbyshire =

British architect

Sir Andrew George Derbyshire FRIBA (7 October 1923 – 3 March 2016) was a British architect. He was a senior partner, later chairman, and following retirement, President, of the architectural practice Robert Matthew Johnson-Marshall (RMJM) and Partners, under the original named-partner architects. He was knighted in 1986.

Derbyshire studied at Queens' College, Cambridge, and at the Architectural Association, London, before realising, as principal architect with RMJM, the master-planning and designing of the University of York campus in Heslington (from 1962), said to be his chef d'oeuvre.

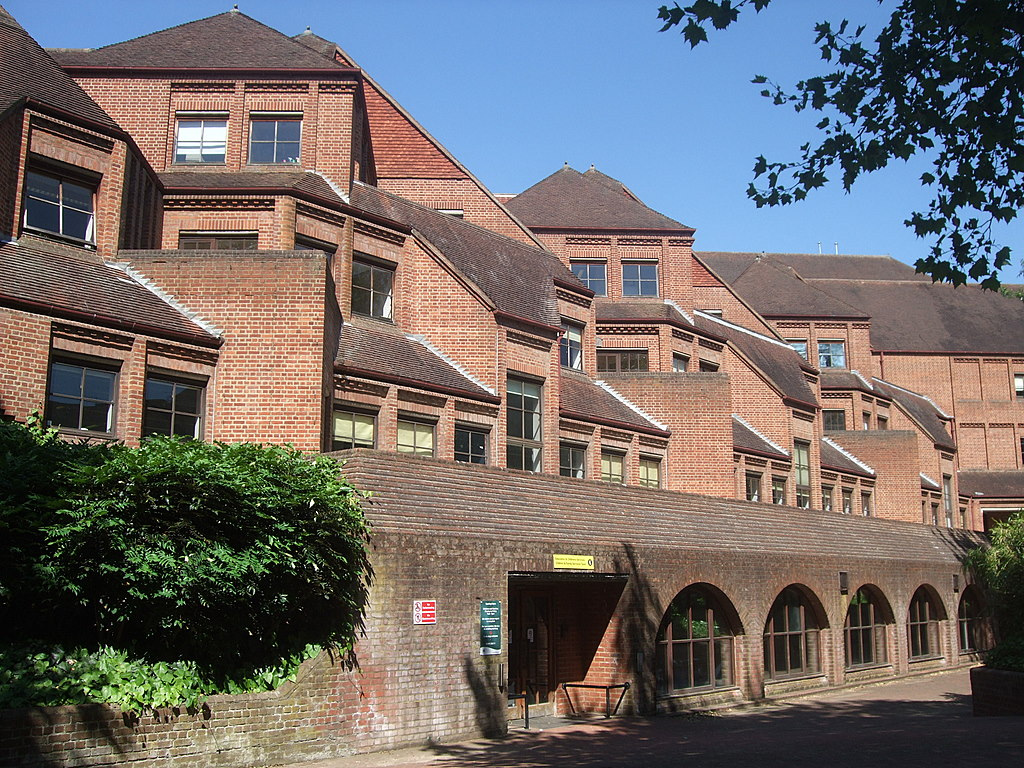
Hillingdon Civic Centre by Derbyshire

Other works included the Castle Market in Sheffield. His Hillingdon Civic Centre in a neo-vernacular style made extensive use of brick and tile, to pay homage to traditional homely brick architecture of nearby buildings and suburban developments that were "indigenous to the borough".

National Life Stories conducted an oral history interview (C467/77) with Andrew Derbyshire in 2003 for its Architects Lives' collection held by the British Library.
