= The Artist as Hephaestus =

Bronze statue in London, England

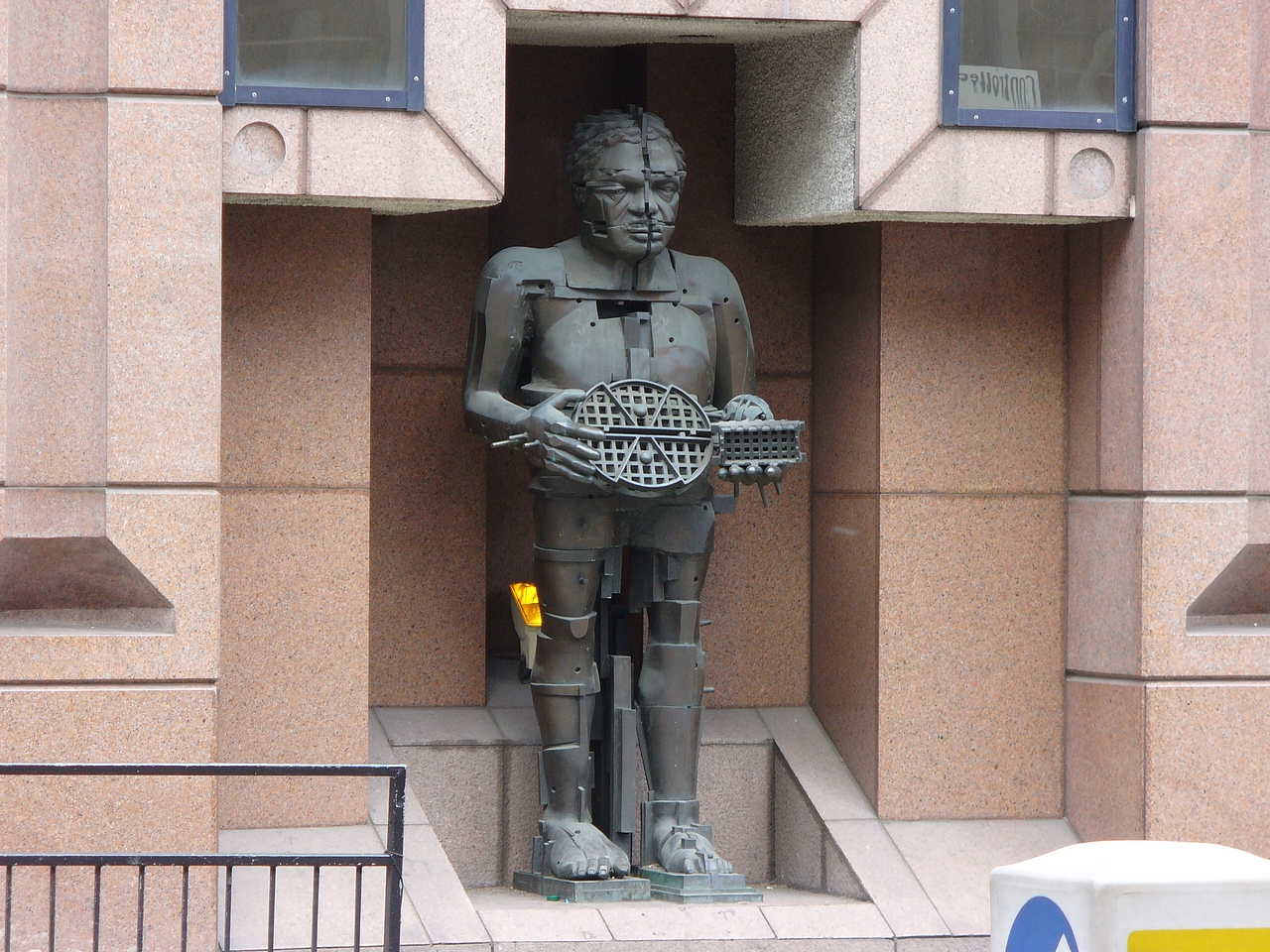
The Artist as Hephaestus in 2006, in situ at 34–36 High Holborn

The Artist as Hephaestus is a bronze statue by Sir Eduardo Paolozzi, created in 1987. It depicts a standing human figure, a self-portrait of Paolozzi 2.64 metres (8 ft 8 in) tall, with the left foot advanced as if walking, holding two pierced objects akin to sieves.

== History ==
The sculpture was commissioned by London and Paris Property Group to decorate the façade of its new office building at 34–36 High Holborn in London, and displayed in a purpose-built niche from 1987 to late 2012. It was removed by the building owner when the property was scheduled for refurbishment in 2012. The sculpture failed to sell at an auction at Bonhams in November 2012, but was sold to art dealer Wentworth Beaumont in 2014 for £110,500.

The sculpture is based on a bronze bust of Paolozzi made by Celia Scott for Charles Jencks in 1983. Scott gave Paolozzi a plaster cast of the work (which Paolozzi donated to the Scottish National Gallery of Modern Art in 1998).

Paolozzi made his own plaster self-portrait based on Scott's work in 1987 (bought by the National Portrait Gallery in 1988) and then made two preliminary bronze models that were displayed at the Royal Academy Summer Exhibition in 1987: an 85 centimetres (33 in) high bronze figure entitled Selfportrait with a Strange Machine (bought by the National Portrait Gallery in 1987, with a second version on display at the Scottish National Gallery of Modern Art from 1989 to 2010), and a 150 centimetres (59 in) bronze figure entitled Portrait of the Artist as Vulcan (sold at Christie's in London in 2006).

Paolozzi donated a full-sized plaster and polystyrene version of The Artist as Hephaestus to the National Portrait Gallery in 1990.
