= Modern Two =

Edinburgh modern art gallery

Coordinates: 55°57′06.52″N 3°13′26.75″W

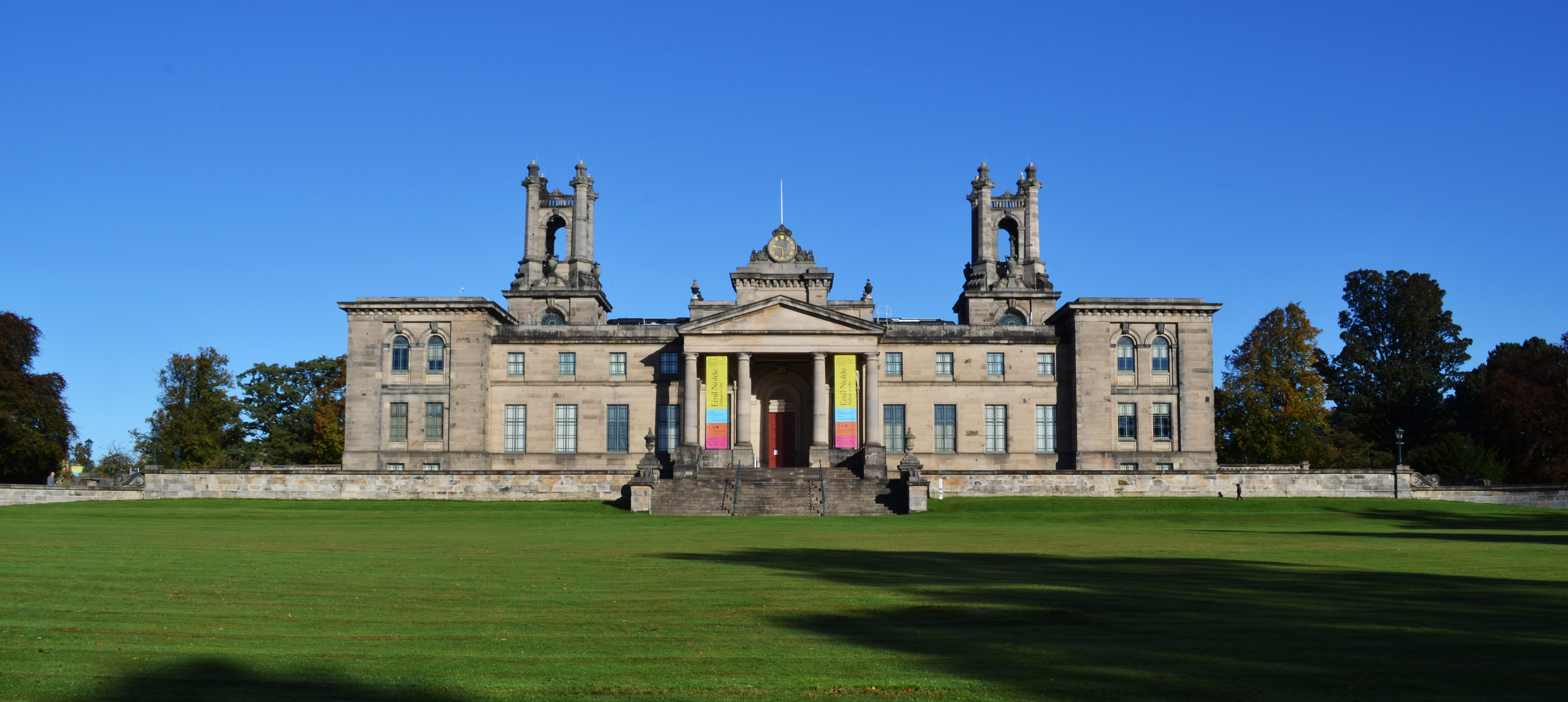
- Former names: Dean Orphanage; Dean Education Centre; Dean Gallery
- Location: 73 Belford Road, Edinburgh, EH4 3DR, Scotland, United Kingdom
- Type: Modern art museum
- Visitors: 328,527 (2024, Modern One and Two)
- Public transit access: Haymarket Station
- Website: www.nationalgalleries.org/visit/scottish-national-gallery-modern-art

Listed Building – Category A
- Official name: 73 Belford Road, Dean Gallery, (Former Dean Orphanage), Including Lodges, Terrace, Boundary Walls, Steps And Gates
- Designated: 15 June 1965
- Reference no.: LB27969

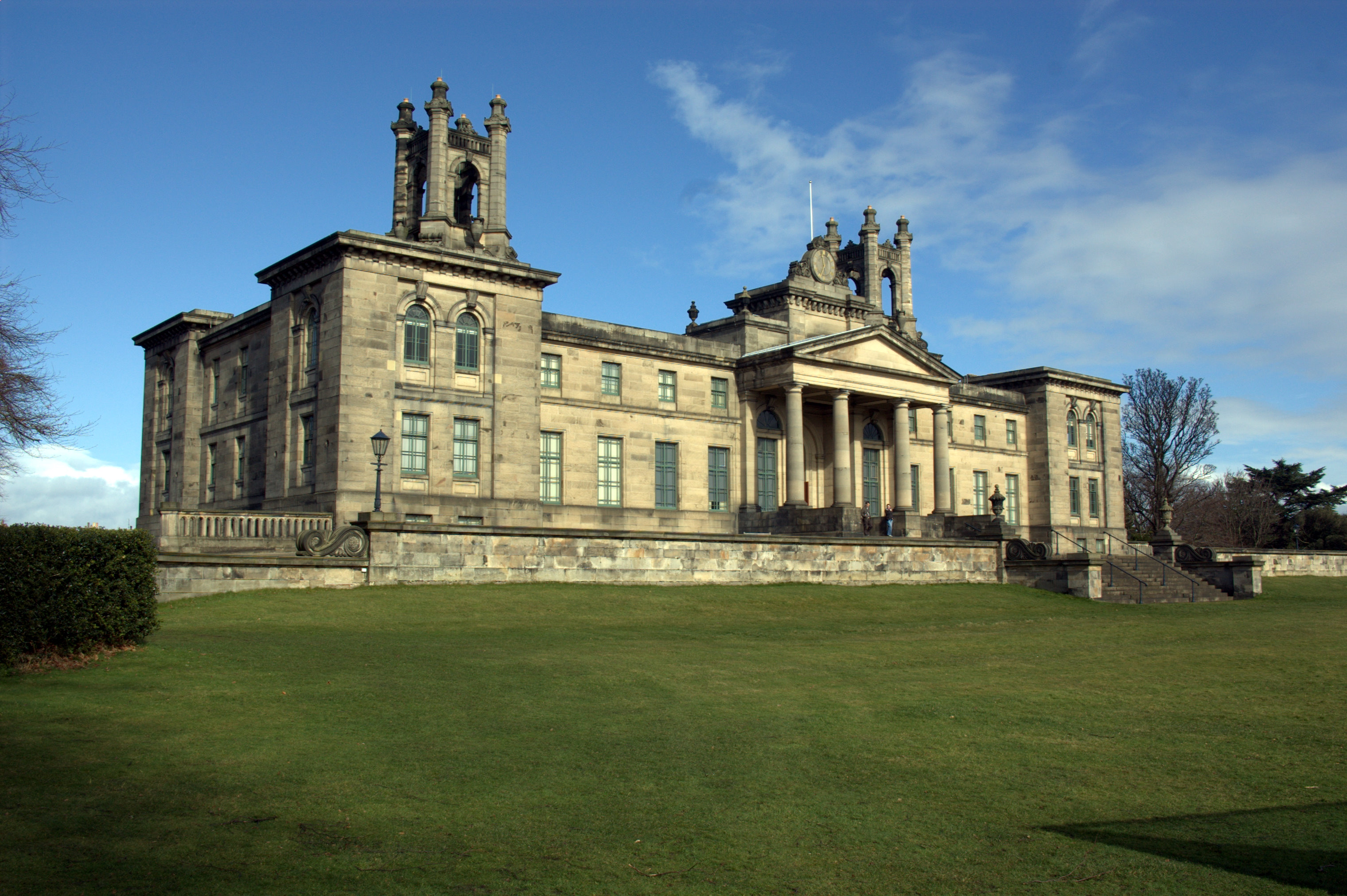
Modern Two, part of the Scottish National Gallery of Modern Art that houses the Paolozzi collection

Modern Two, formerly the Dean Gallery, in Edinburgh, is one of the two buildings housing the Scottish National Gallery of Modern Art, one of Scotland's national art galleries. It is operated by National Galleries Scotland. It is twinned with Modern One which lies on the opposite side of Belford Road.

== History ==
In 1727, Andrew Gairdner, an Edinburgh merchant, founded an Institution for the benefit of orphans. In 1734 a collection was made on behalf of the Institution which raised a sum of money which enabled the feuing of an area of ground at 'The Dingwall Park' adjoining the Trinity College Kirk, in the valley between the Netherbow and the Calton Hill in Edinburgh. In the same year, William Adam prepared a plan for an Orphan Hospital and the foundation stone was laid. Children were moved in the following year. At that time the location was largely undeveloped but over the years various developments such as a slaughterhouse and the North Bridge had encroached. Also, the physical condition of the Hospital had deteriorated. It was realised that this situation was affecting the health of the children and the decision was made in 1828 to purchase parts of the land conveniently located just to the west of the city, on higher ground above the Dean Village. Plans for the replacement Orphan Hospital were drawn up by Thomas Hamilton with an original contract cost of £11,849 and the new Hospital was erected between 1831 and 1833. The managers of the Hospital endeavoured to balance the need to secure a suitable building in keeping with its elevated location at a reasonable cost but which did not resemble a workhouse or prison.

The building, known as the Dean Orphanage, which is the subject of a watercolour painting c.1830 by Thomas Hamilton, took three years to build. Built in Craigleith stone from the nearby quarry, it is in English Baroque style with classical detail. The towers over the staircases contain chimneys and contribute to the Edinburgh skyline in the west of the city centre. The clock above the entrance comes from the original Orphan Hospital and in turn from the 1764 demolition of the Netherbow Port on the High Street, which formerly separated the High Street from the Canongate.

The building, which is owned by the City of Edinburgh Council, served as the Dean Education Centre for many decades before conversion to a gallery.

The plot of allotment gardens at the main entrance dates from 1940 when many school grounds were used for such purposes.

=== Conversion to gallery ===
The conversion of the building into a gallery was designed by the architect Terry Farrell and Partners.

The gallery opened in 1999 opposite the existing Scottish National Gallery of Modern Art. In 2011, the buildings were rebranded Modern Two and Modern One, respectively.

== Collection ==
Modern Two houses the Paolozzi Gift, a collection of works by Sir Eduardo Paolozzi, given by the artist to the Scottish National Gallery of Modern Art in 1994. The gallery also contains a large collection of Dada and Surrealist art and literature, much of which was given by Gabrielle Keiller. Modern Two also houses temporary exhibitions.

Modern Two is surrounded by a sculpture garden with a number of modern and avant-garde works on display, including Gate (1972) by William Turnbull, Two Lines up Excentric VI (1977) by George Rickey, La Vierge d'Alsace (1919–1921) by Emile-Antoine Bourdelle, There will be no Miracles Here (2007–2009) by Nathan Coley, Master of the Universe (1989) by Eduardo Paolozzi, Two Two-Way Mirrored Parallelograms Joined with One Side Balanced Spiral Welded Mesh (1996) by Dan Graham, Macduff Circle (2002) by Richard Long, and Escaped Animals (2002) by Julian Opie.

Selected works at Modern 2

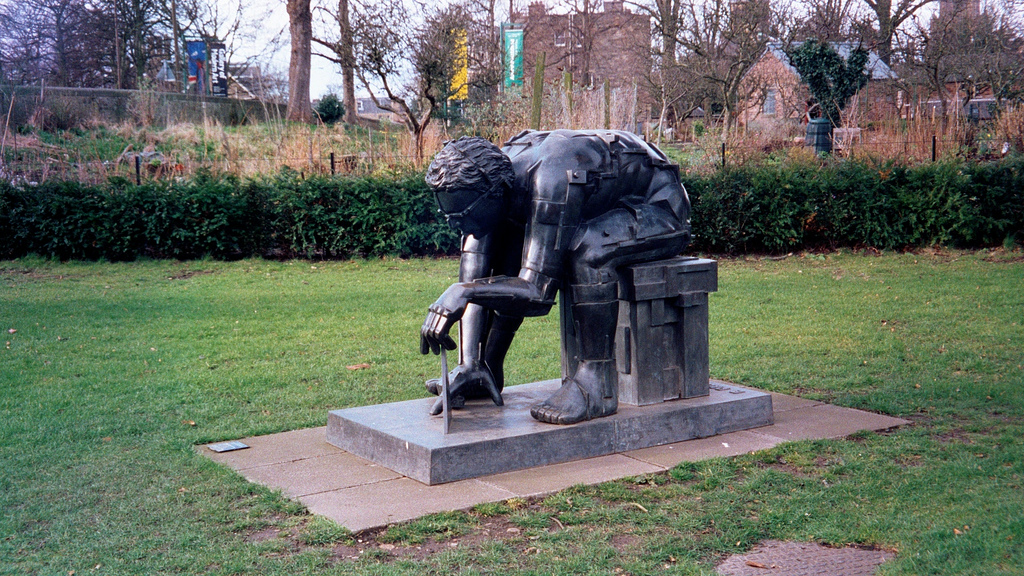
Master of the Universe (1989) by Eduardo Paolozzi

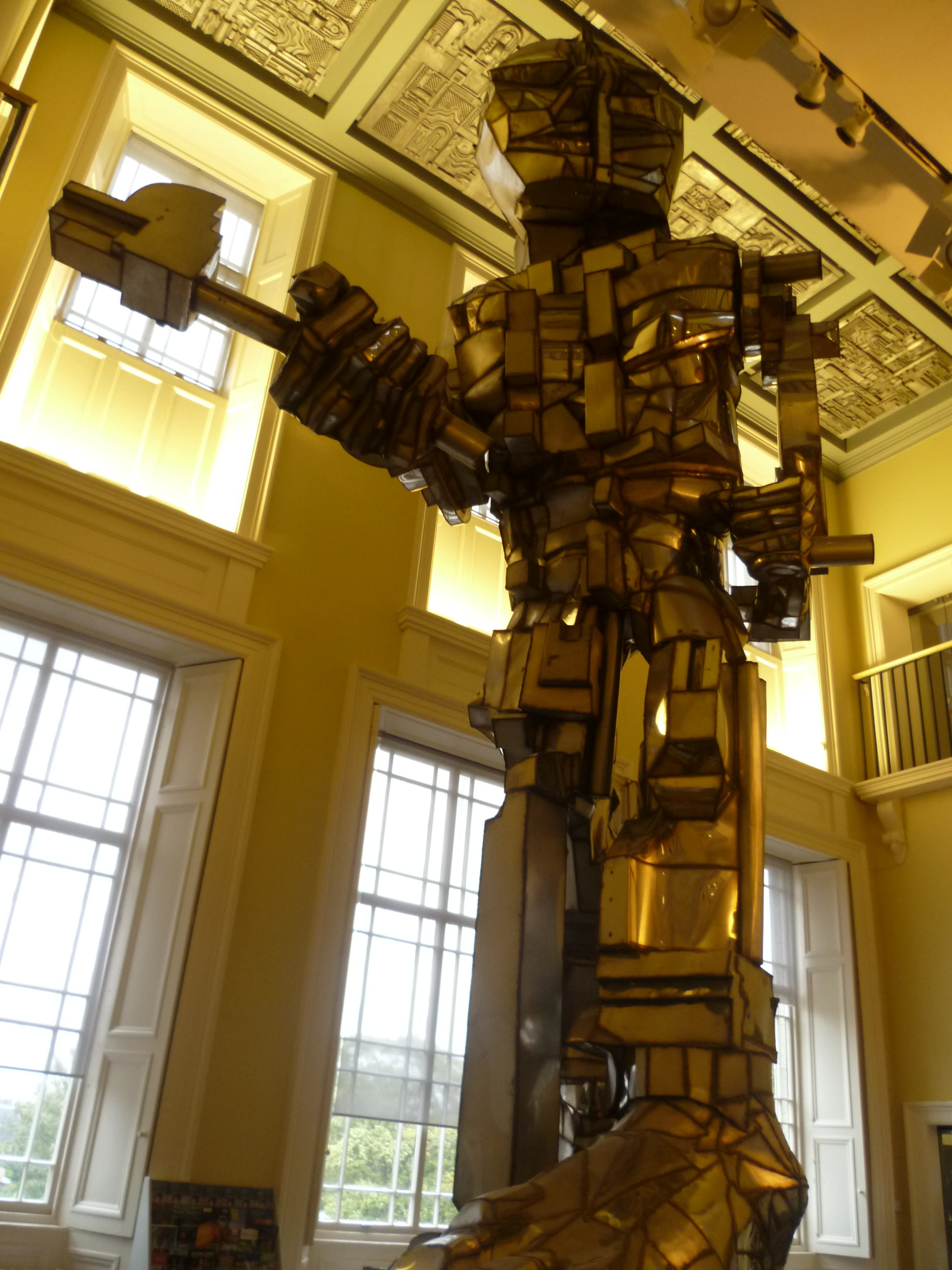
Vulcan (1989) by Eduardo Paolozzi in the Gallery's Great Hall

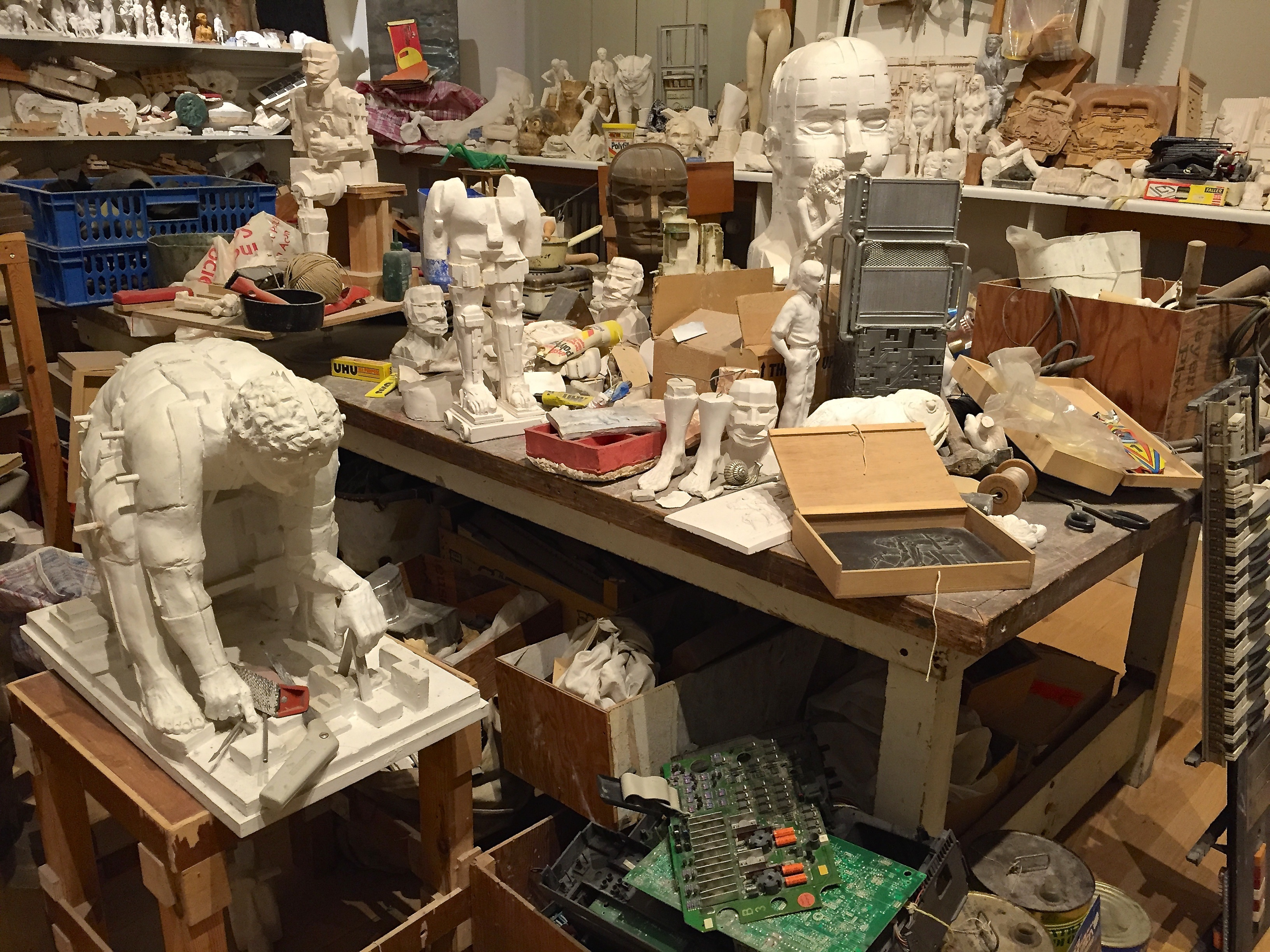
Recreation of Eduardo Paolozzi's studio

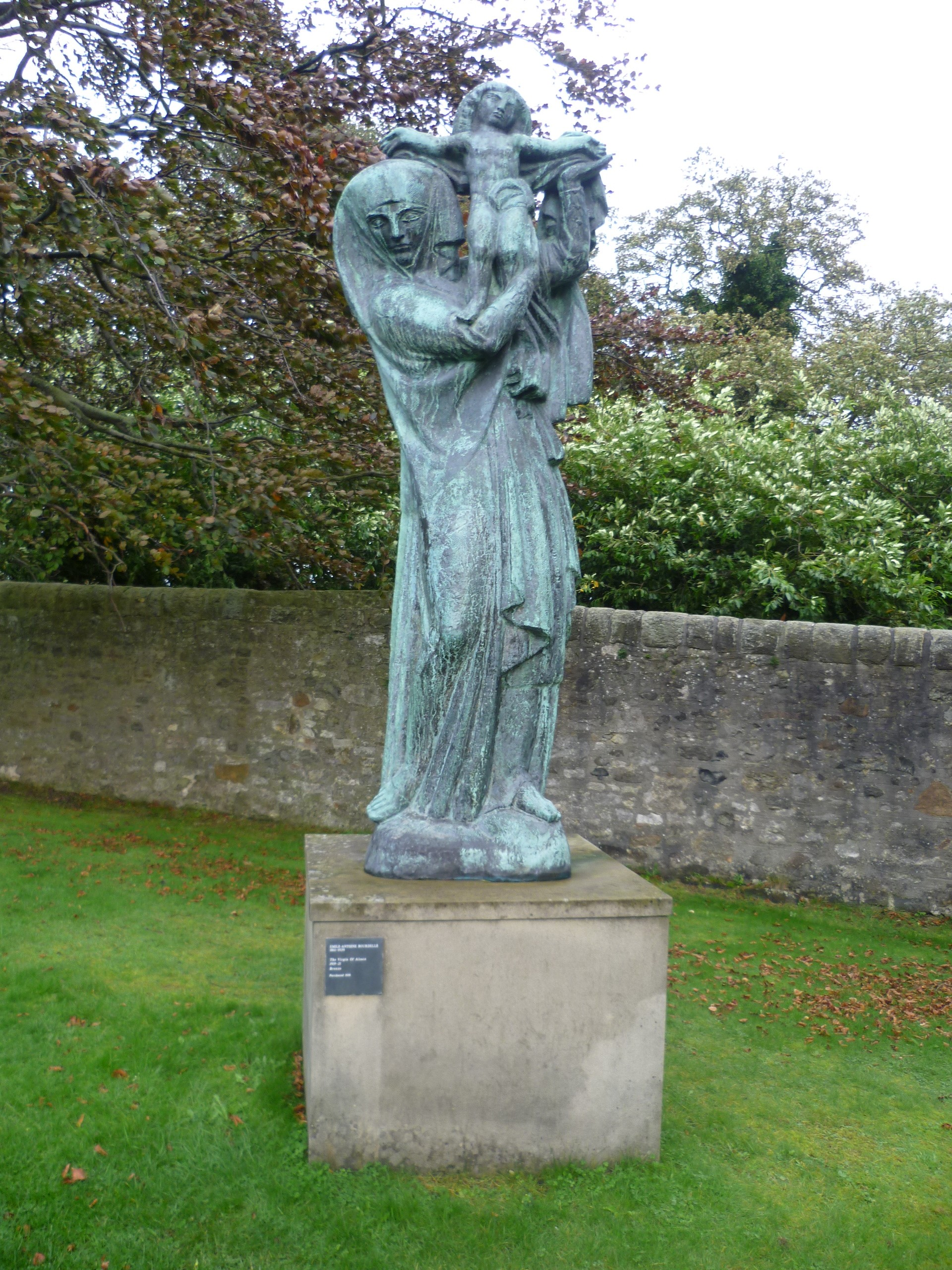
La Vierge d'Alsace (1919–1921) by Emile-Antoine Bourdelle

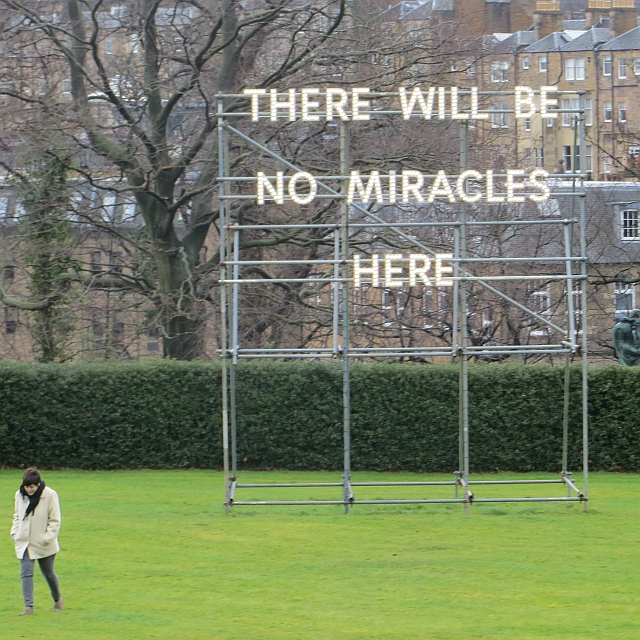
There will be no Miracles Here (2007–2009) by Nathan Coley
