= Eduardo Paolozzi =

Scottish sculptor and artist (1924–2005)

Sir Eduardo Paolozzi CBE RA
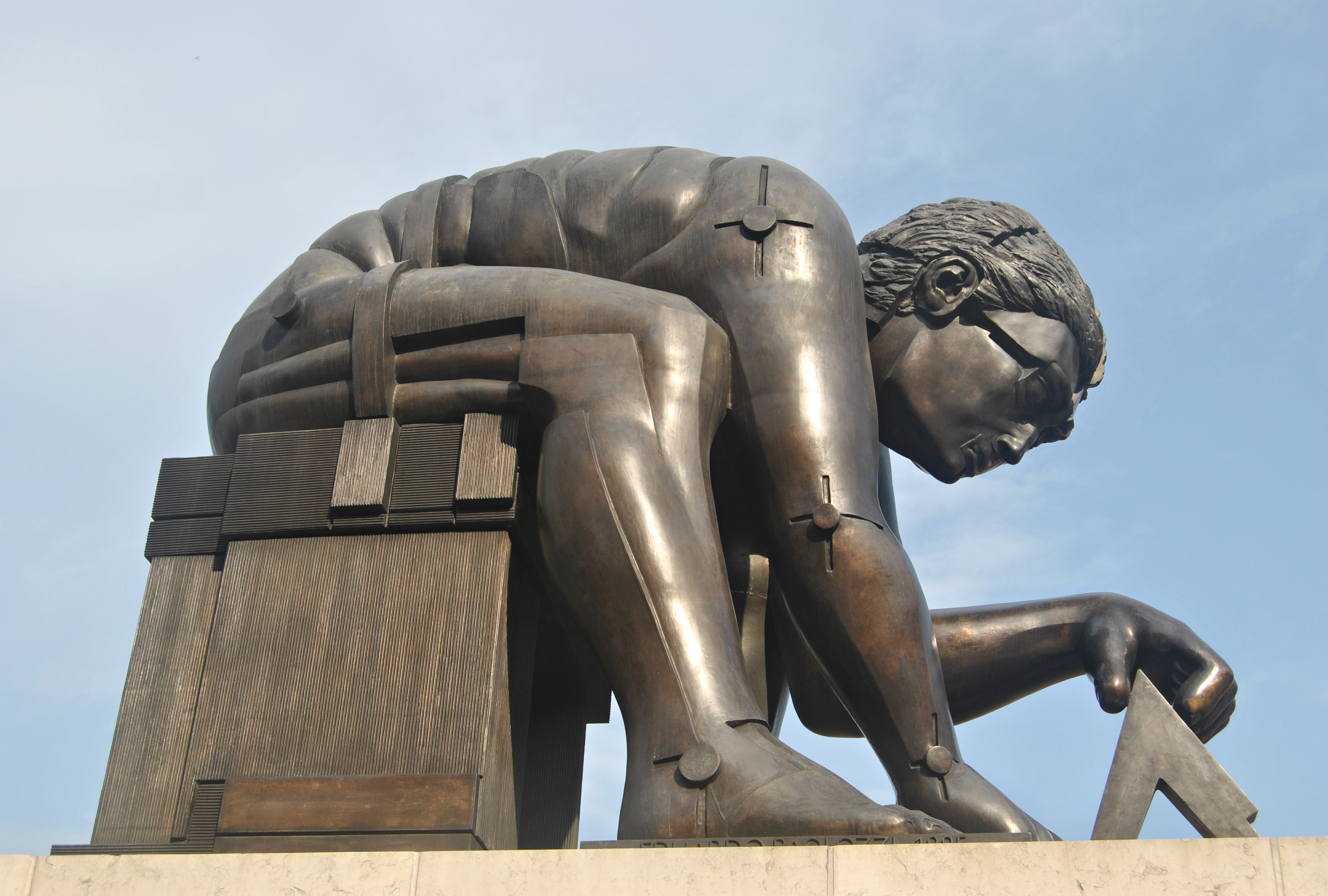
- Paolozzi's 1995 Newton follows William Blake's 1795 print Newton in illustrating a world thought to be determined by mathematical laws.
- Born: 7 March 1924; Leith, Edinburgh, Scotland
- Died: 22 April 2005 (aged 81); London, England
- Education: Edinburgh College of Art, University of Edinburgh; Slade School of Fine Art, UCL
- Known for: Sculpture, art
- Movement: Pop art

Sir Eduardo Luigi Paolozzi (/paʊˈlɒtsi/, Italian: [paoˈlɔttsi]; 7 March 1924 – 22 April 2005) was a Scottish artist, known for his sculpture and graphic works. He is widely considered to be one of the pioneers of pop art.

== Early years ==
Paolozzi's I was a Rich Man's Plaything (1947) is considered the first standard bearer of Pop Art and first to display the word "pop". Paolozzi showed the collage in 1952 as part of his groundbreaking Bunk! series presentation at the initial Independent Group meeting in London.

Eduardo Luigi Paolozzi was born on 7 March 1924 in Leith, Edinburgh, Scotland, and was the eldest son of Italian immigrants. His family was from Viticuso, in the Lazio region. Paolozzi's parents, Rodolfo and Carmela, ran an ice cream shop. Paolozzi used to spend all his summers with his grandparents in Monte Cassino and grew up bilingual. He attended Leith Walk Primary School on Brunswick Road in Edinburgh. In June 1940, after Italy declared war on Britain, Paolozzi was interned as an enemy alien along with most Italian men in the UK. During his three-month internment at HM Prison Edinburgh, his father, grandfather and uncle, who had also been interned, were among the 446 Italian internees who drowned when the ship carrying them to Canada, SS Arandora Star, was sunk by German U-boat U-47 on 2 July 1940.

After completing secondary school at Holy Cross Academy, Ferry Road, Leith, Paolozzi studied at the Edinburgh College of Art in 1943, briefly at Saint Martin's School of Art in 1944, and then at the Slade School of Fine Art at University College London from 1944 to 1947, after which he worked in Paris. While in Paris from 1947 to 1949, Paolozzi became acquainted with Alberto Giacometti, Jean Arp, Constantin Brâncuși, Georges Braque and Fernand Léger. This period became an important influence for his later work. For example, the influence of Giacometti and many of the original Surrealists he met in Paris can be felt in the group of lost-wax sculptures made by Paolozzi in the mid-1950s. Their surfaces, studded with found objects and machine parts, were to gain him recognition.

== Career ==
After Paris, he moved back to London eventually establishing his studio in Chelsea. The studio was a workshop filled with hundreds of found objects, models, sculptures, materials, tools, toys and stacks of books. Paolozzi was interested in everything and would use a variety of objects and materials in his work, particularly his collages. In 1955 he moved with his family to the village of Thorpe-le-Soken in Essex. Together with Nigel Henderson he established Hammer Prints Limited, a design company producing wallpapers, textiles and ceramics that were initially manufactured at Landermere Wharf, and when his evening course in printed textile design at the Central School of Art and Design attracted the Trinidadian graphics student Althea McNish, he was instrumental in pointing her towards her future career as a textile designer. Paolozzi came to public attention in the 1950s by producing a range of striking screenprints and Art brut sculpture. He was a founder of the Independent Group in 1952, which is regarded as the precursor to the mid-1950s British and late 1950s American Pop Art movements. His seminal 1947 collage I was a Rich Man's Plaything is considered the earliest standard bearer representing Pop Art. He always described his work as surrealist art and, while working in a wide range of media through his career, became more closely associated with sculpture. Paolozzi is recognized for producing largely lifelike statuary works, but with rectilinear (often cubic) elements added or removed, or the human form deconstructed in a cubist manner.

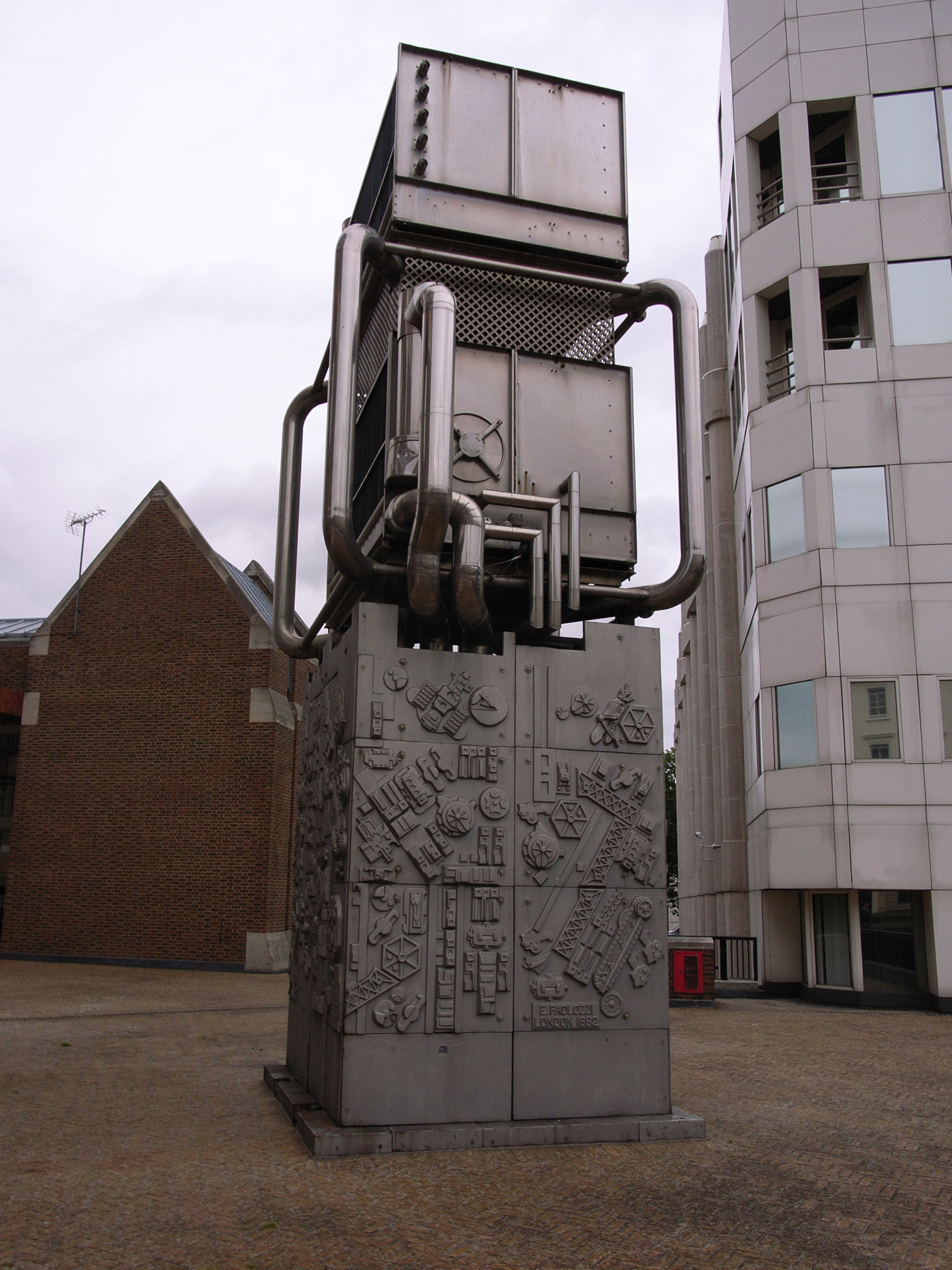
Paolozzi sculpture (1982) near Pimlico station of the London Underground system

He taught sculpture and ceramics at several institutions, including the Hochschule für bildende Künste Hamburg (1960–62), University of California, Berkeley (in 1968) and at the Royal College of Art. Paolozzi had a long association with Germany, having worked in Berlin from 1974 as part of the Berlin Artist Programme of the German Academic Exchange Programme. He was a professor at the Fachhochschule in Cologne from 1977 to 1981, and later taught sculpture at the Akademie der Bildenden Künste in Munich. Paolozzi was fond of Munich and many of his works and concept plans were developed in a studio he kept there, including the mosaics of the Tottenham Court Road Station in London. He took a stab at industrial design in the 1970s with a 500-piece run of the upscale Suomi tableware by Timo Sarpaneva that Paolozzi decorated for the German Rosenthal porcelain maker's Studio Linie.

Paolozzi's graphic work of the 1960s was highly innovative. In a series of works he explored and extended the possibilities and limits of the silkscreen medium. The resulting prints are characterised by Pop culture references and technological imagery. These series are: As Is When (12 prints on the theme of Paolozzi's interest in the philosopher Ludwig Wittgenstein; published as a limited edition of 65 by Editions Alecto, 1965); Moonstrips Empire News (100 prints, eight signed, in an acrylic box; published as a limited edition of 500 by Editions Alecto, 1967); Universal Electronic Vacuum (10 prints, poster and text; published by Paolozzi as a limited edition of 75, 1967); General Dynamic Fun. (part 2 of Moonstrips Empire News; 50 sheets plus title sheet; boxed in five versions; published as a limited edition of 350 by Editions Alecto, 1970).

In the 1960s and 1970s, Paolozzi artistically processed man-machine images from popular science books by German doctor and author Fritz Kahn (1888–1968), such as in his screenprint "Wittgenstein in New York" (1965), the print series Secrets of Life – The Human Machine and How it Works (1970), or the cover design for John Barth's novel Lost in the Funhouse (Penguin, 1972). As recently as 2009, the reference to Kahn was discovered by Uta and Thilo von Debschitz during their research of work and life of Fritz Kahn.

== Later career ==
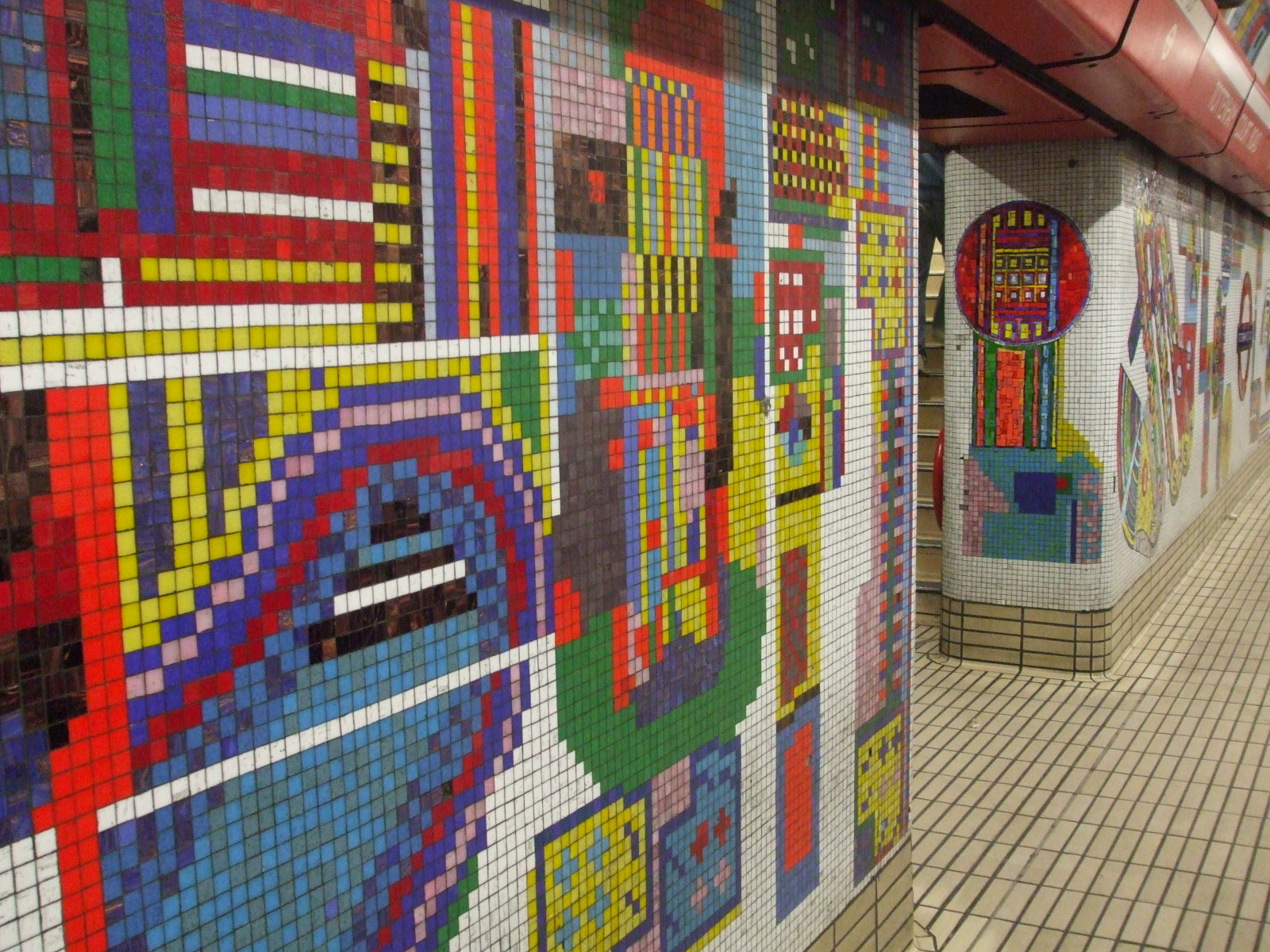
Paolozzi mosaic designs for Tottenham Court Road Station. Location shown is the Central Line westbound platform (1982).

Paolozzi was appointed Commander of the Order of the British Empire (CBE) in the 1968 New Year Honours, and in 1979 he was elected to the Royal Academy (RA). In 1967, he started contributing to literary magazine Ambit, which began a lifelong collaboration.

In 1980, the Institute of Chartered Accountants in England and Wales (ICAEW) commissioned a set of three tapestries from Paolozzi to represent 'present day and future societies in relation to the role played by ICAEW', as part of the institute's centenary celebrations. The three highly distinctive pieces – which Paolozzi wanted to "depict our world of today in a manner using the same bold pictorial style as the Bayeux tapestries in France" – currently hang in Chartered Accountants' Hall.

Inside the Kingfisher Shopping Centre in Redditch, Paolozzi designed a monumental series of twelve mosaic panels, each roughly 21 feet by 10 feet, collectively celebrating the town's industrial heritage, particularly its long history as a centre of needle manufacture. Commissioned by the Redditch Development Corporation with support from the Arts Council of Great Britain and local industry, the works were unveiled in April 1983 by then Arts Council chairman Sir William Rees-Mogg ahead of a visit from Queen Elizabeth II. Reflecting Paolozzi's characteristic blend of vibrant colour, abstracted forms and symbolic imagery, the mosaics weave together local historical motifs with more universal references such as spacecraft and cameras, creating what he described as a “multi-evocative metaphor” that bridges Redditch's past and its aspirations for the future. The installation remains one of his most significant large-scale public art commissions in the United Kingdom.

He was promoted to the office of Her Majesty's Sculptor in Ordinary for Scotland in 1986, which he held until his death. He also received an Honorary Doctorate from Heriot-Watt University in 1987.

Paolozzi was knighted by Queen Elizabeth II in the 1989 New Year Honours as Knight Bachelor (Kt).

In 1994, Paolozzi gave the Scottish National Gallery of Modern Art a large body of his works, and much of the content of his studio. In 1999 the National Galleries of Scotland opened the Dean Gallery to display this collection. The gallery displays a recreation of Paolozzi's studio, with its contents evoking the original London and Munich locations and also houses a Scottish-Italian restaurant, Paolozzi's Kitchen, which was created by Heritage Portfolio in homage to the local artist.

In 2013, Pallant House Gallery in Chichester held a major retrospective Eduardo Paolozzi: Collaging Culture (6 July −13 October 2013), featuring more than 100 of the artist's works, including sculpture, drawings, textile, film, ceramics and paper collage. Pallant House Gallery has an extensive collection of Paolozzi's work given and loaned by the architect Colin St John Wilson, who commissioned Paolozzi's sculpture Newton After Blake for the British Library.

== Personal life ==
Paolozzi was married in 1951 to Freda Elliot, a textile designer. They had three daughters, Louise, Anna and Emma, before divorcing in 1988.

In 2001, Paolozzi suffered a near-fatal stroke, causing an incorrect magazine report that he had died. The illness made him a wheelchair user, and he died in a hospital in London in April 2005.

== Notable public works ==
- Mosaic murals for the platforms, passages and escalator entrances of Tottenham Court Road tube station, London, and Paolozzi's most extensive work. Escalator entrance murals were removed as part of redevelopment, and were donated to the University of Edinburgh though most mosaics remain in situ and were restored in 2017.
- Cover artwork for Paul McCartney's 1973 album Red Rose Speedway
- Ceiling panels and window tapestry at Cleish Castle, Scotland
- Piscator sculpture, Euston Station concourse, London, until 2019, present location unknown
- Cast aluminium doors for the University of Glasgow's Hunterian Gallery, commissioned by William Whitfield
- Bronze sculpture Newton after Blake, 1995, in the forecourt of the British Library
- Concept of Newton, Kowloon Park, Hong Kong
- The Manuscript of Monte Cassino, an open palm, a section of limb and a human foot, located at Picardy Place at the south end of Leith Walk, Edinburgh, looking towards Paolozzi's birthplace Leith
- Head of Invention sculpture in front of the Design Museum in Kensington
- Sculpture A Maximis Ad Minima in Kew Gardens at the west end of the Princess of Wales Conservatory
- Mosaics in Milward Square, an atrium of the Kingfisher Shopping Centre in Redditch
- Athena sculpture in the foyer of the John McIntosh Arts Centre at The London Oratory School
- Faraday sculpture at the University of Birmingham
- ‘Jahrenstellar '78m’, 1978 at Manchester Art Gallery
- The Artist as Hephaestus, on High Holborn from 1987, removed 2012 present location unknown
- Head of Oscar Wilde produced posthumously in 2024 using Paolozzi's original maquette, on King's Road
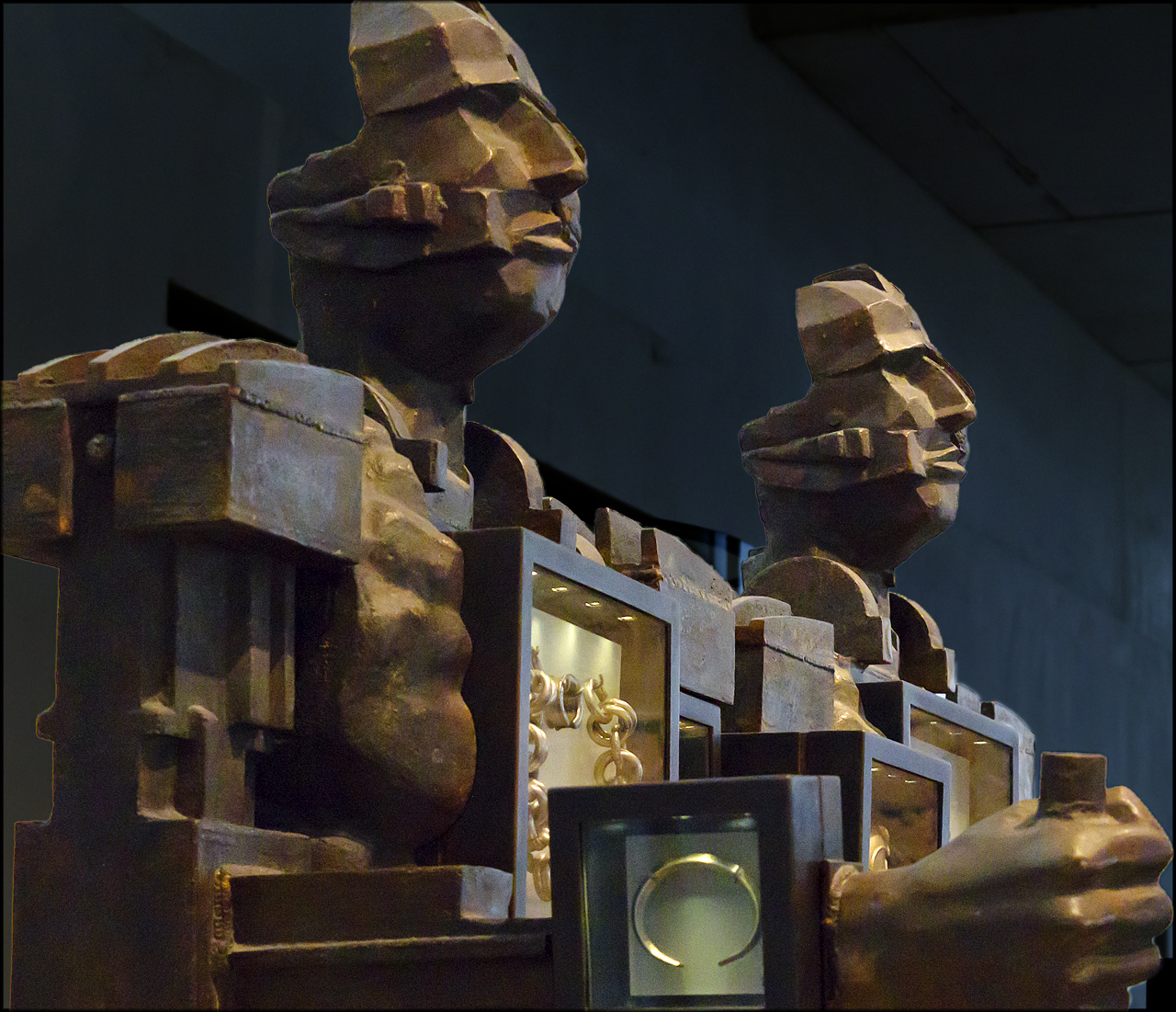
Scotland's Early People, National Museum of Scotland. The sculptures incorporate display cases for ancient artefacts

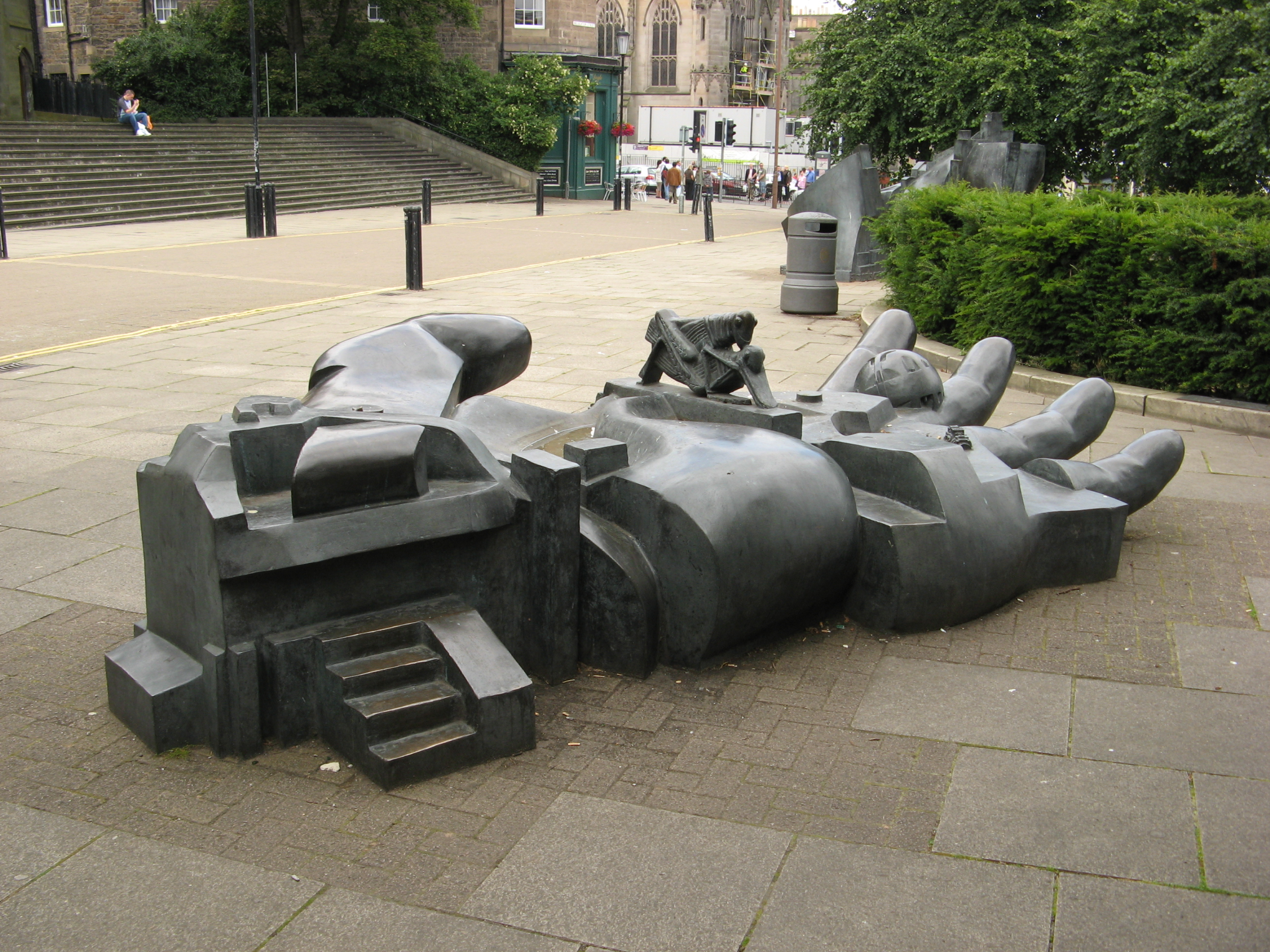
The Manuscript of Monte Cassino

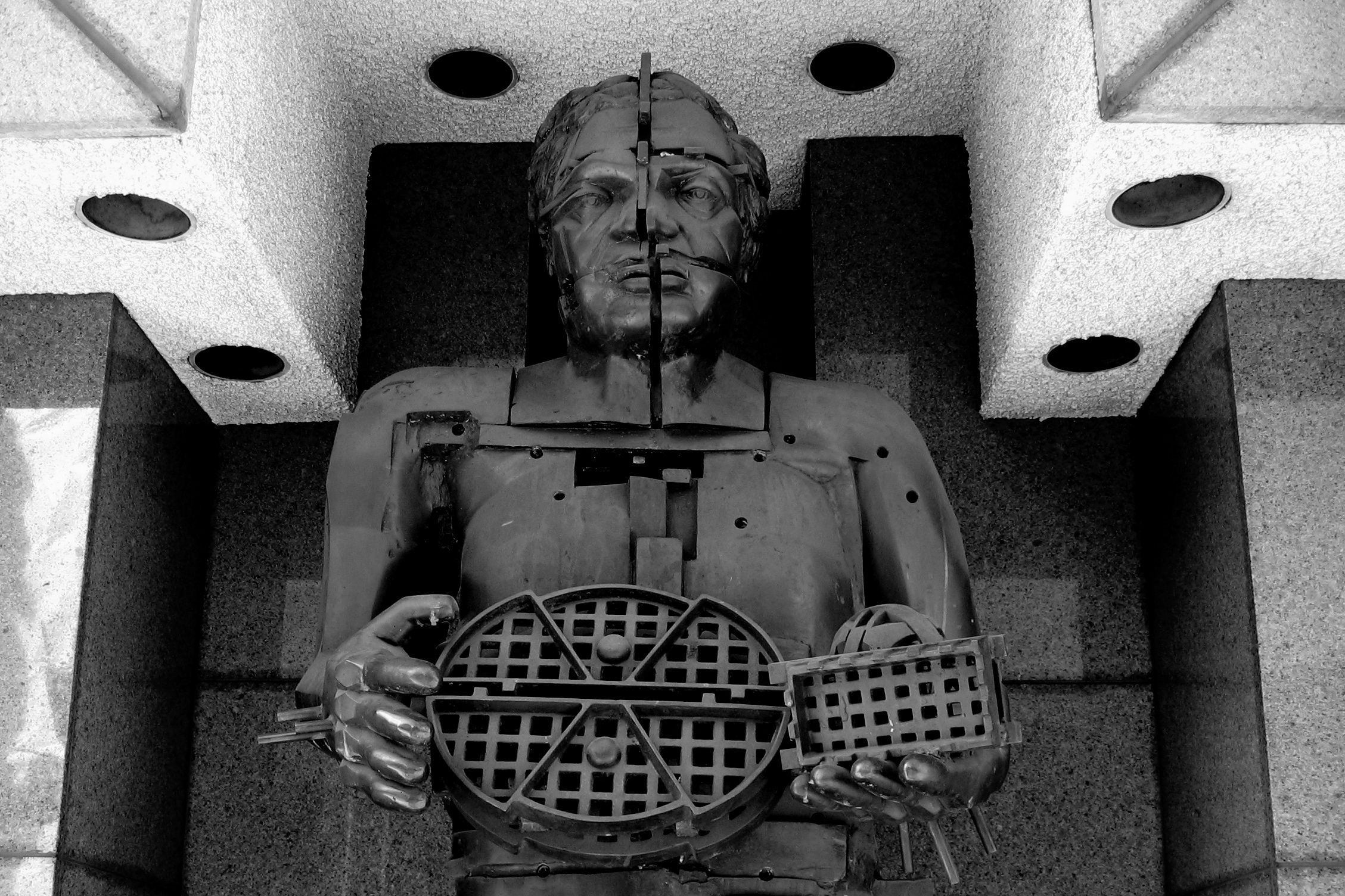
The Artist as Hephaestus

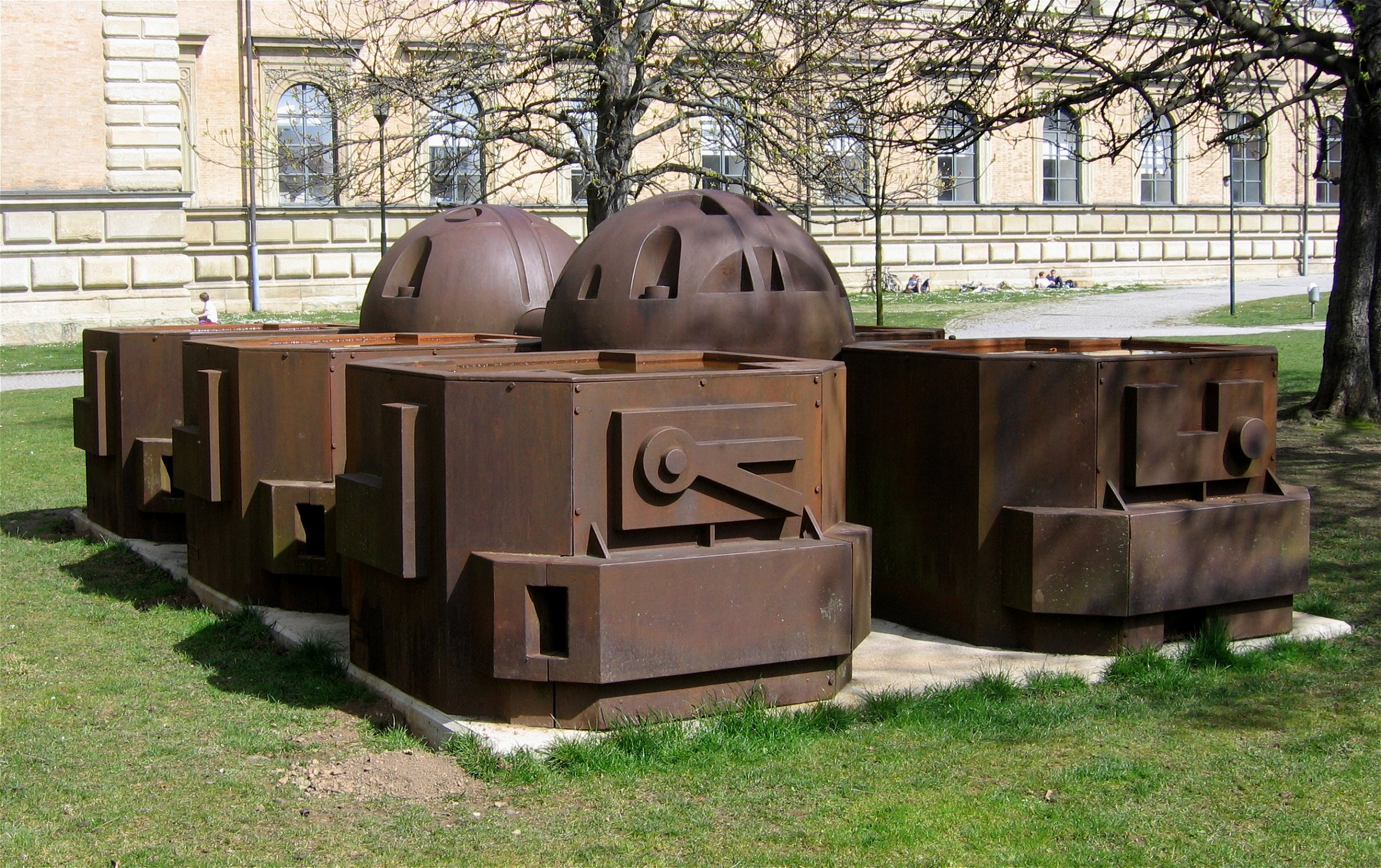
For Leonardo, 1986

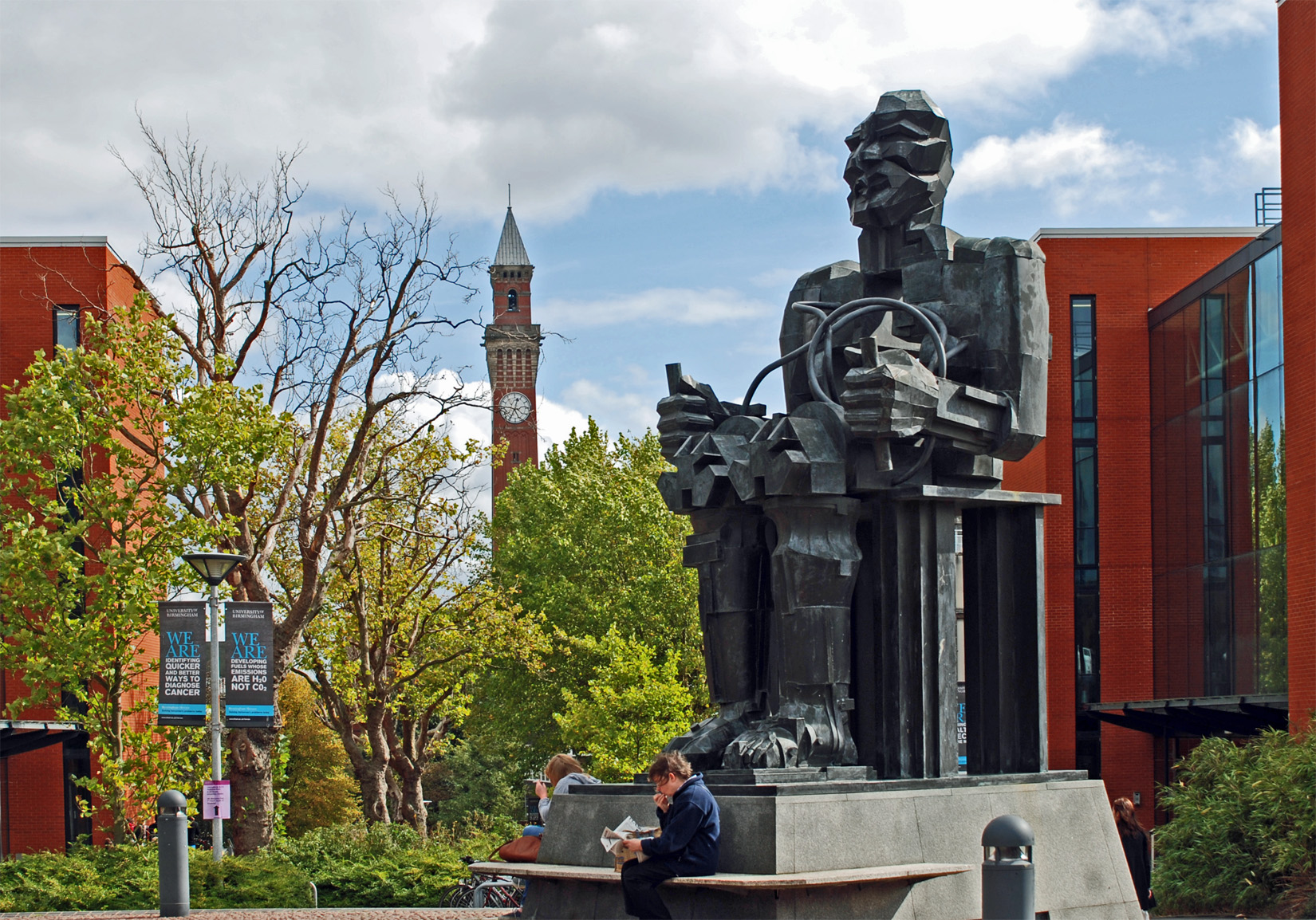
Faraday, at the University of Birmingham

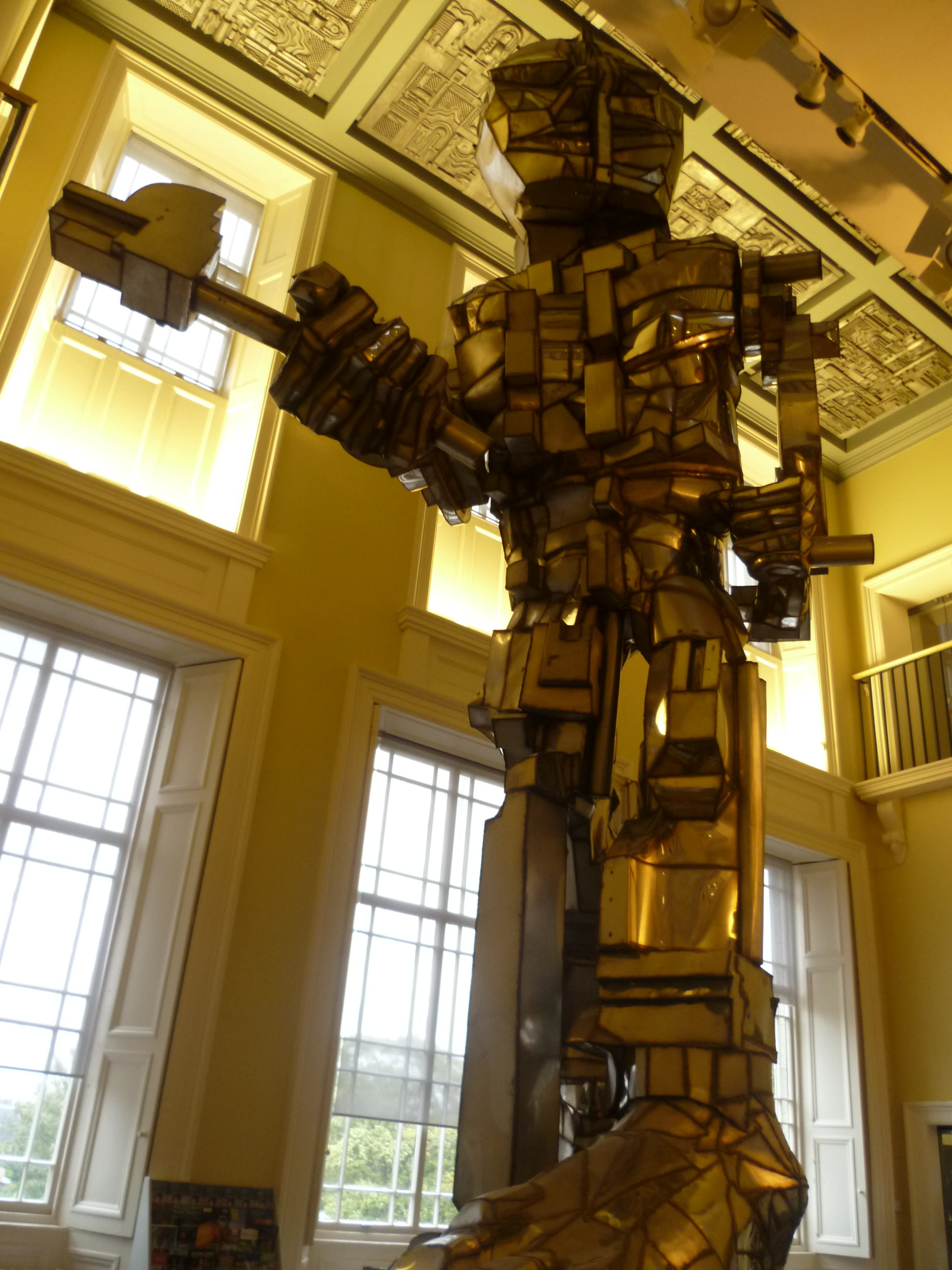
Vulcan, 1998–9, Scottish National Gallery of Modern Art

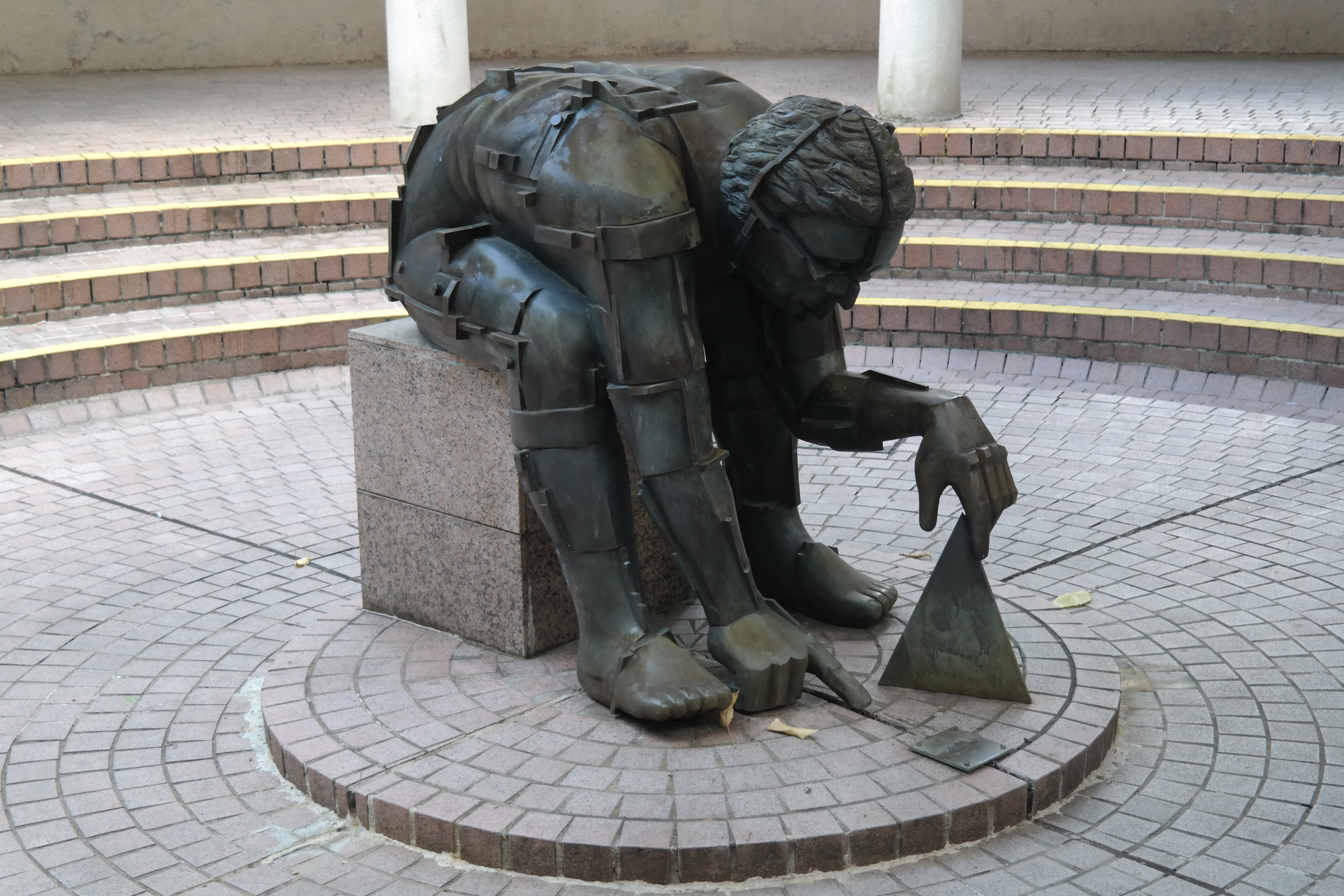
Concept of Newton, Hong Kong

== Other work ==
- Eduardo Paolozzi played a deaf-mute in Lorenza Mazzetti's 1956 Free Cinema film Together, alongside the painter Michael Andrews.
- A photograph of Paolozzi's large, well-worn right hand was selected by Lord Snowdon as the cover image for his book Photographs by Snowdon: A Retrospective (August 2000).

== Writings ==
- Metafisikal Translations by Eduardo Paolozzi, Lelpra, London, 1962
- Eduardo Paolozzi by Eduardo Paolozzi, Tate, London, 1971
- Junk and the New Arts and Crafts Movement by Eduardo Paolozzi, Talbot Rice Centre, Edinburgh, August 1979
- Recurring themes by Eduardo Paolozzi, Rizzoli (1984), ISBN 978-0-8478-0573-0

== See also ==
- Art of the United Kingdom
- Modern sculpture
- Stuart Sutcliffe
