= Head of Oscar Wilde =

Sculpture by Eduardo Paolozzi

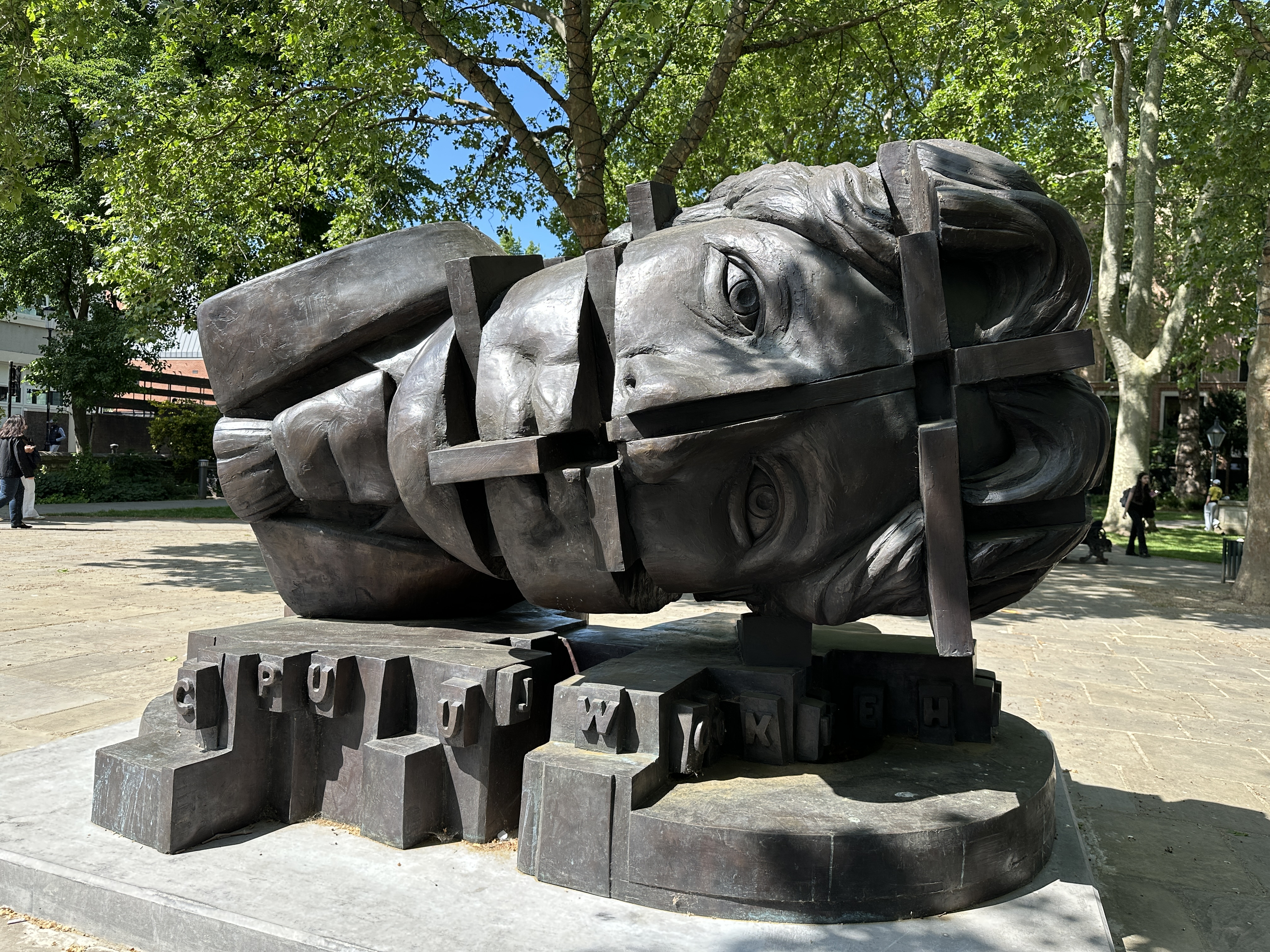
- Artist: Eduardo Paolozzi
- Year: 1998
- Completion date: 2024
- Medium: Sculpture
- Subject: Oscar Wilde
- Location: Dovehouse Green, King's Road, Chelsea, London, United Kingdom

The Head of Oscar Wilde is a sculpture of the writer Oscar Wilde by Eduardo Paolozzi. It was completed by Paolozzi in 1998 but not unveiled until 2024.
