= Scottish National Gallery of Modern Art =

Part of National Galleries of Scotland in Edinburgh

National Galleries Scotland: Modern

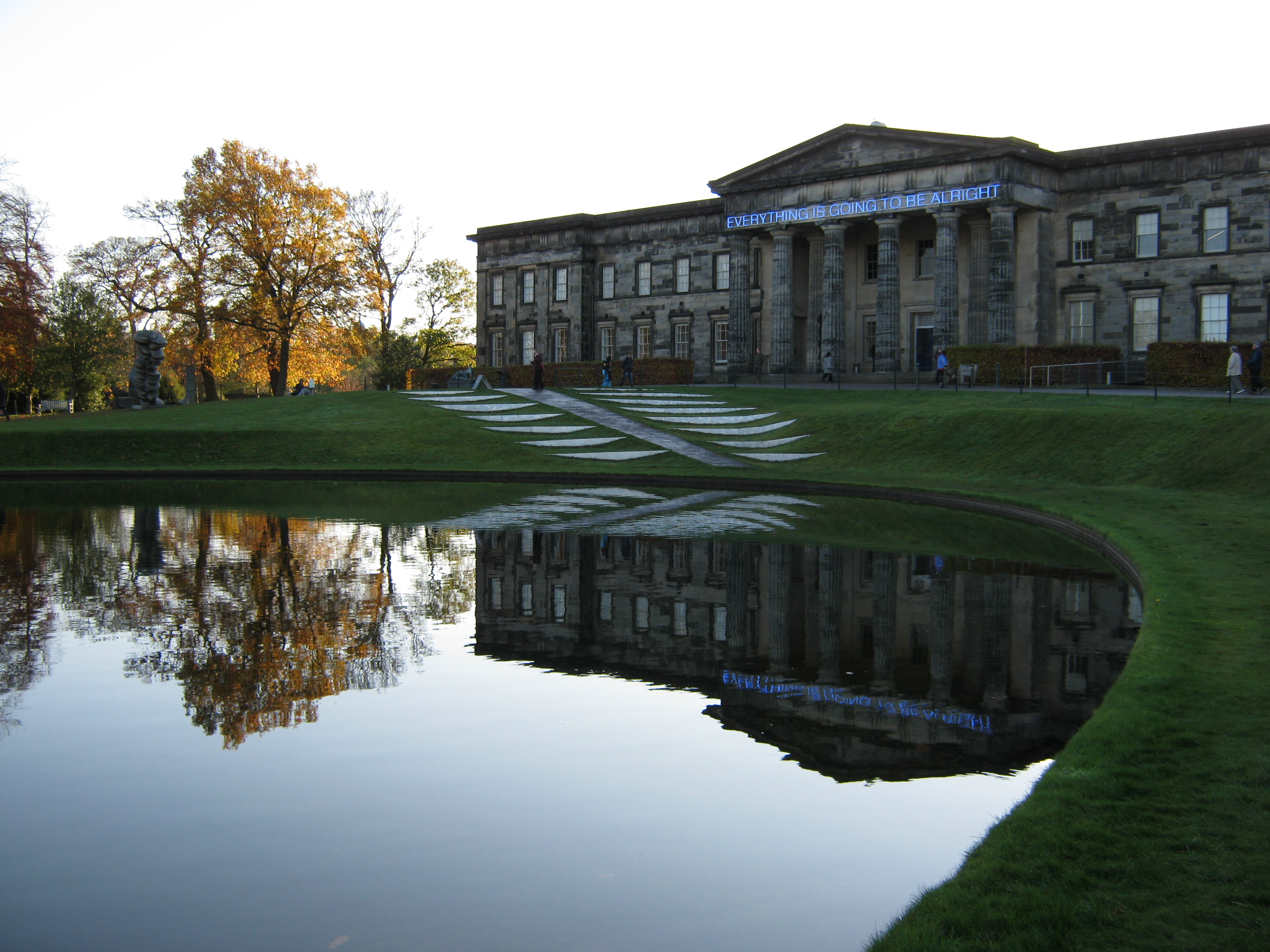
- — National Galleries Scotland: Modern One
- Interactive fullscreen map
- Established: 1960
- Location: Edinburgh, Scotland, UK
- Coordinates: 55°57′03.09″N 3°13′39.23″W
- Visitors: 356,895 – Modern One; 213,042 – Modern Two (2018)
- Directors: Simon Groom (Director); Anne Lyden (Director General)
- Website: nationalgalleries.org

National Galleries Scotland: Modern (the Scottish National Gallery of Modern Art) is part of National Galleries Scotland, which is based in Edinburgh, Scotland. The Modern houses the collection of modern and contemporary art dating from about 1900 to the present in two buildings, Modern One and Modern Two, that face each other on Belford Road to the west of the city centre.

The Modern has a collection of more than 6000 paintings, sculptures, installations, video work, prints and drawings and also stages major exhibitions.

== History ==
The first Scottish National Gallery of Modern Art (SNGMA) opened in August 1960 in Inverleith House, a Georgian building set in the middle of Edinburgh's Royal Botanic Garden.

In 1984 the SNGMA moved to the former premises of the John Watson's Institution on Belford Road in the west of the city, a large neo-classical building which was originally designed by William Burn in 1825 as a refuge for fatherless children.

Inverleith House became a contemporary art gallery, curated by the Royal Botanic Garden, also featuring exhibitions of works and specimens from its historic collections.

In 1999, the SNGMA's collection had outgrown the Watson's premises, and it expanded into the Dean Orphan Hospital, a neoclassical orphanage situated on the other side of Belford Road which had been erected by Thomas Hamilton in 1833. The Dean Gallery was converted to a gallery by Terry Farrell and Partners.

In 2012, National Galleries of Scotland underwent a rebranding exercise, and the two Belford Road galleries were renamed Modern One and Modern Two.

A further rebranding was undertaken in 2023, when the organisation's name was changed to National Galleries Scotland. The names of the individual gallery buildings were also renamed, and the Scottish National Gallery of Modern Art is now billed as National Galleries Scotland: Modern.

== Collections ==
=== Modern One ===
Modern One, the former Watson's Institution building, presents works from the collection as well as a programme of changing exhibitions. The early part of the collection features European art from the beginning of the twentieth century, including work by André Derain and Pierre Bonnard, cubist paintings and holdings of expressionist and modern British art. Special highlights include paintings by Henri Matisse and Pablo Picasso and the Scottish Colourists Samuel John Peploe, John Duncan Fergusson, Francis Cadell and Leslie Hunter.

The Modern has a renowned collection of international post-war work and an outstanding collection of modern Scottish art. The post-war collection features art by Francis Bacon, David Hockney, Andy Warhol, Joan Eardley and Alan Davie, with more recent works by artists including Douglas Gordon, Antony Gormley, Robert Priseman and Tracey Emin. The collection also includes ARTIST ROOMS, a collection of modern and contemporary art acquired for the nation by National Galleries Scotland and Tate with support from the National Heritage Memorial Fund, the Art Fund and the Scottish and British Governments. The growing collection includes works by major international artists including Andy Warhol, Louise Bourgeois, Robert Mapplethorpe and Damien Hirst. The collection includes the larger of Roy Lichtenstein's In the Car pieces.

The displays change on a regular basis.

Selected works from the collection

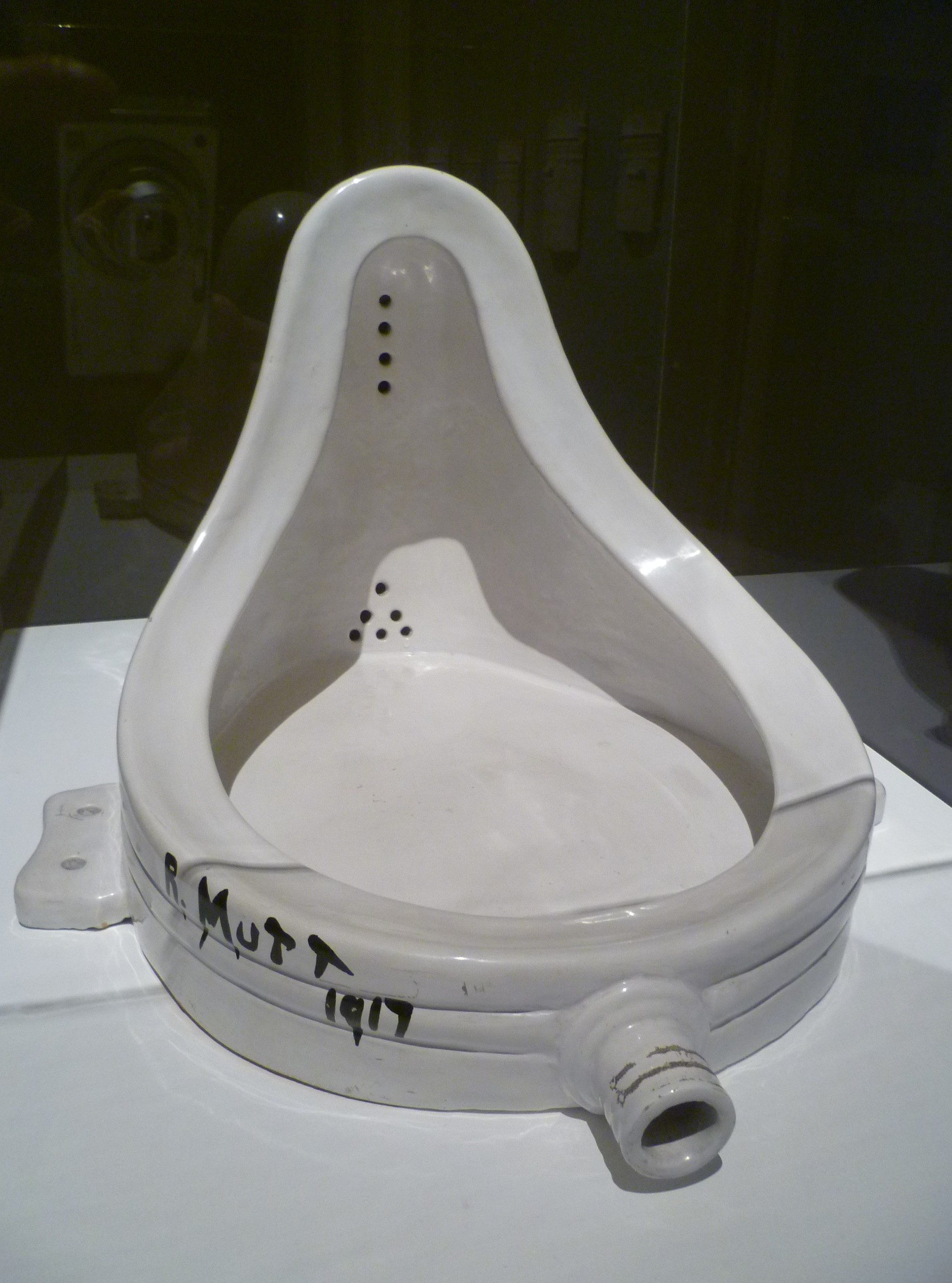
Fountain (Marcel Duchamp, replica)

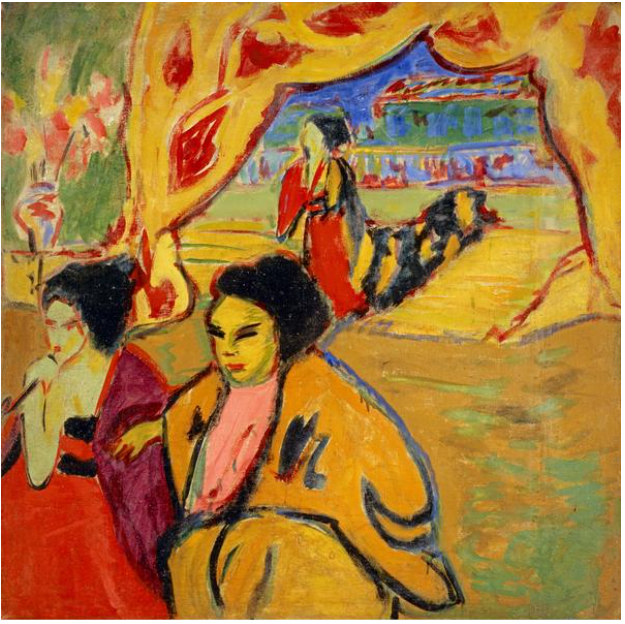
Japanisches Theater (Ernst Ludwig Kirchner, 1909)

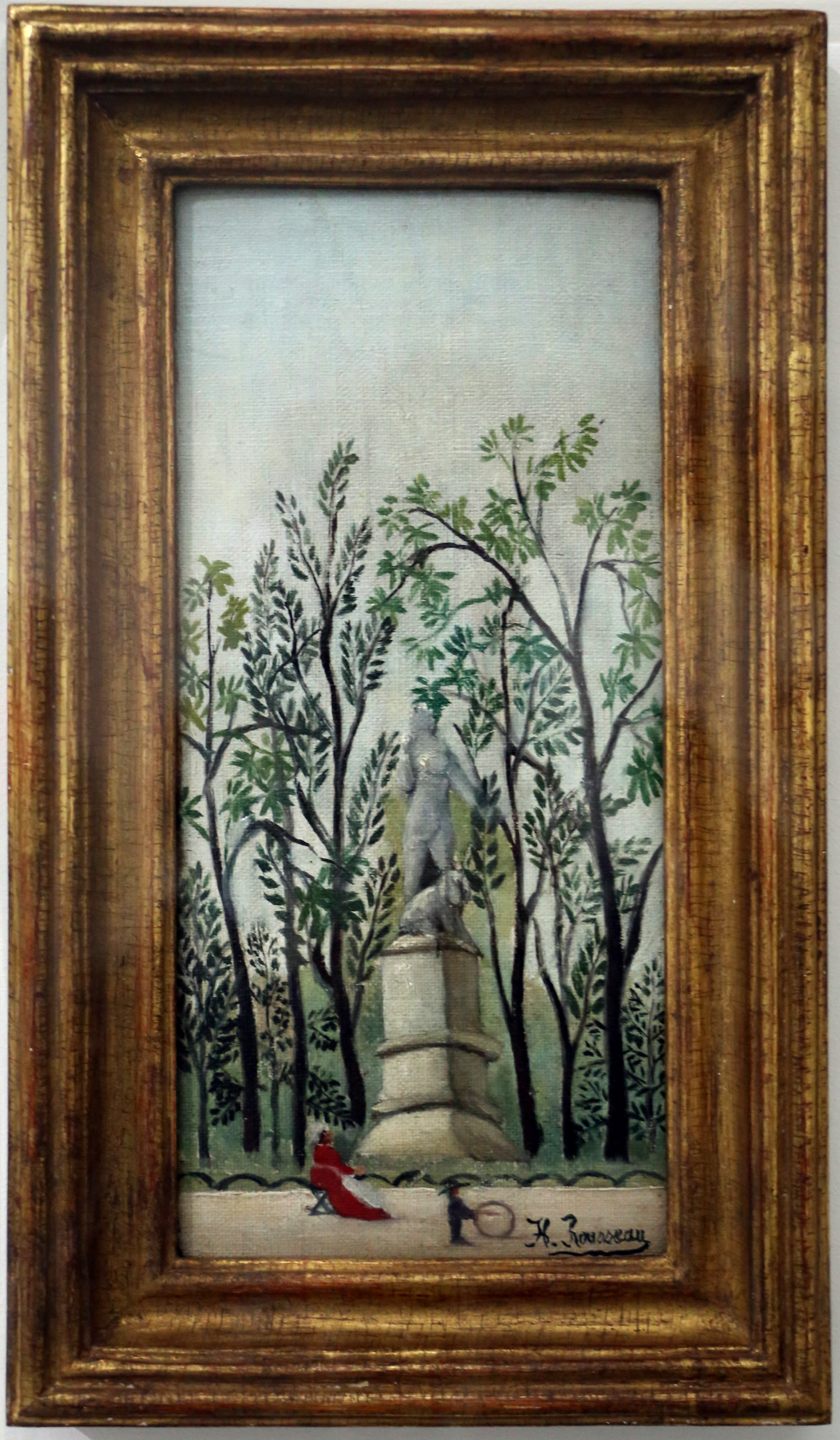
Statue of Diana in the Park (Henri Rousseau, 1909)

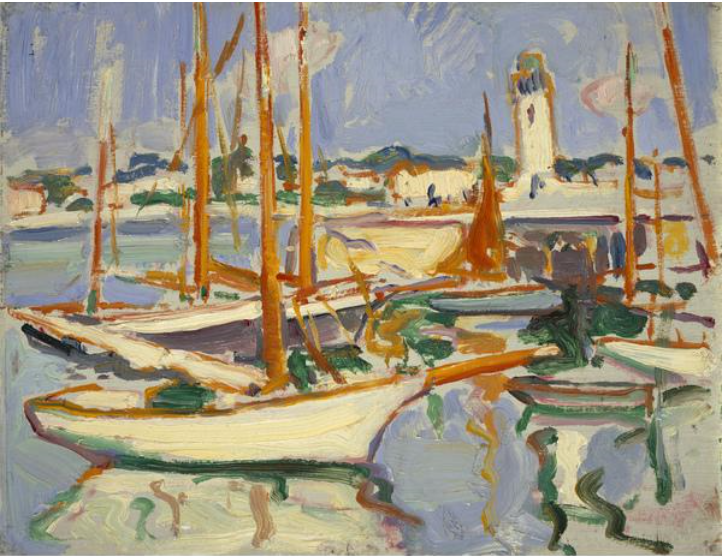
Boats at Royan (Samuel Peploe, 1910)

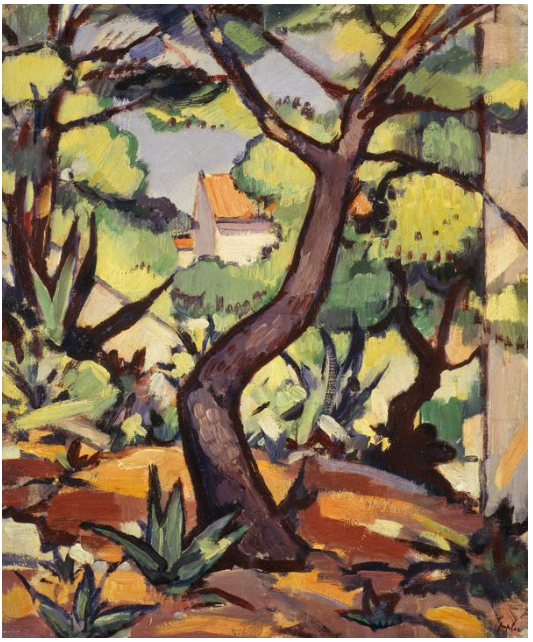
Landscape at Cassis (Samuel Peploe, 1910)

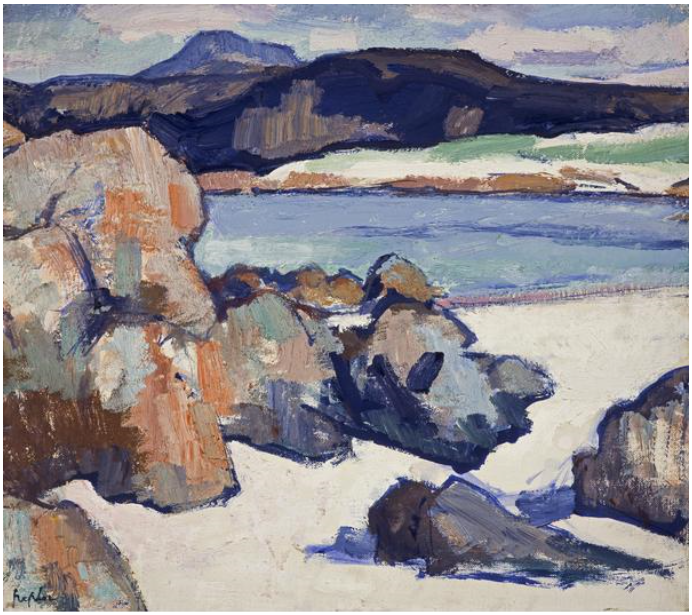
Iona Landscape - Rocks (Samuel Peploe, c.1925)

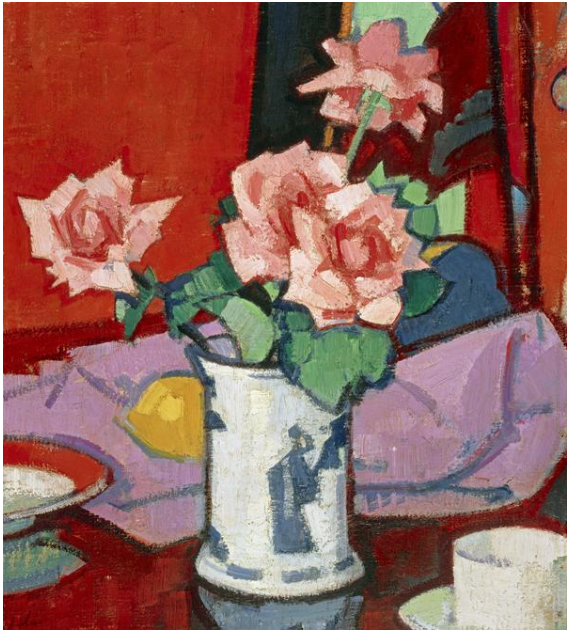
Pink Roses, Chinese Vase (Samuel Peploe, c.1916)

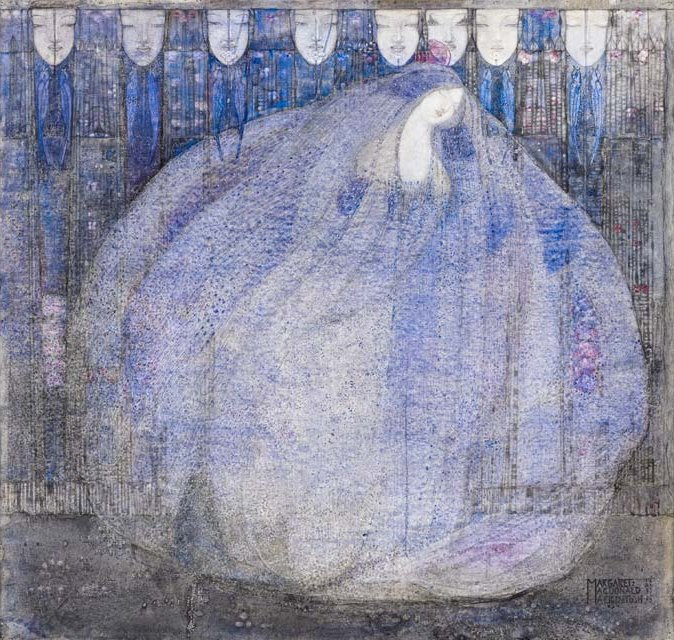
The Mysterious Garden (Margaret Macdonald Mackintosh, 1911)

=== Modern Two ===
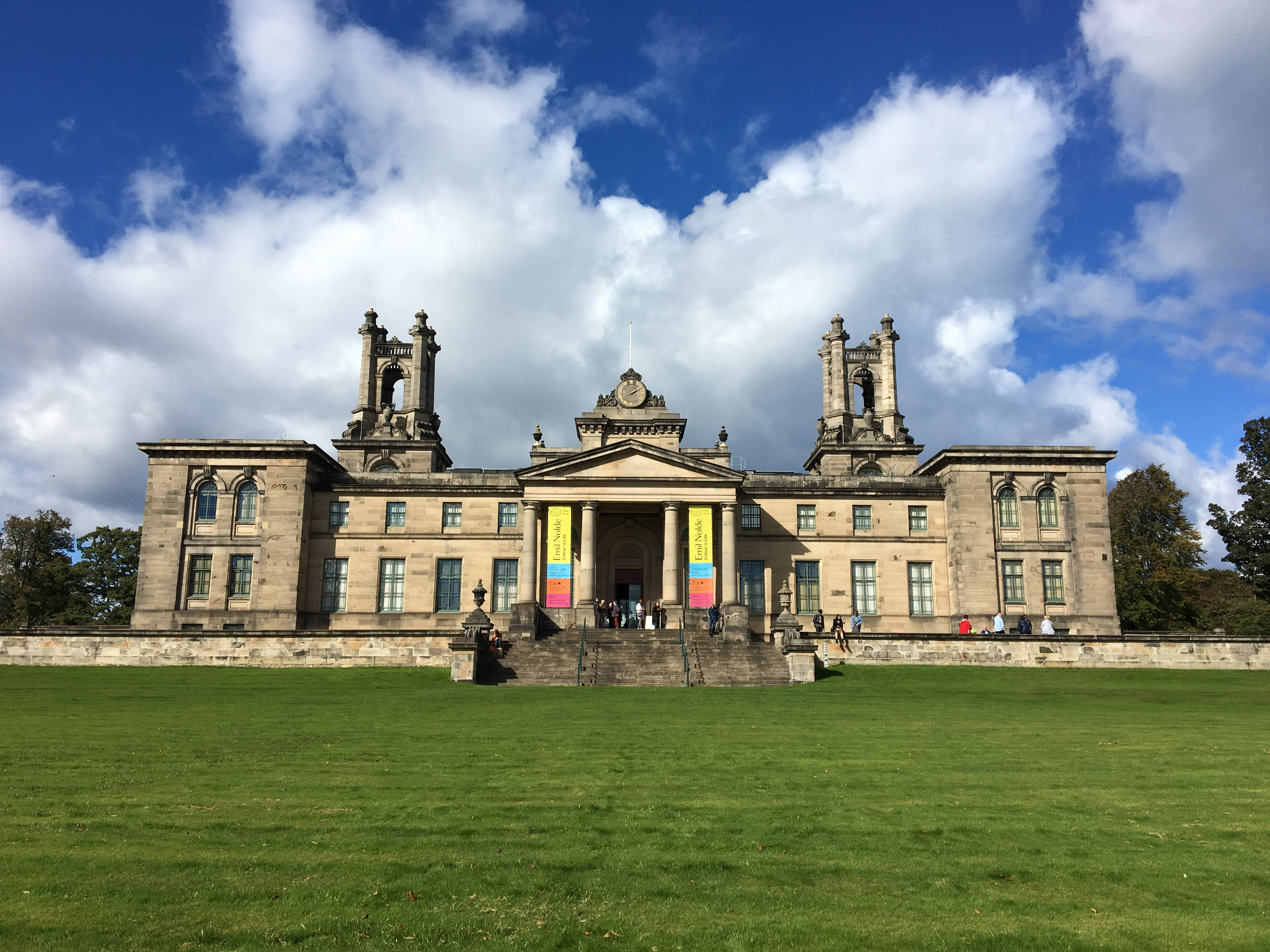
Modern Two, the former Dean Gallery

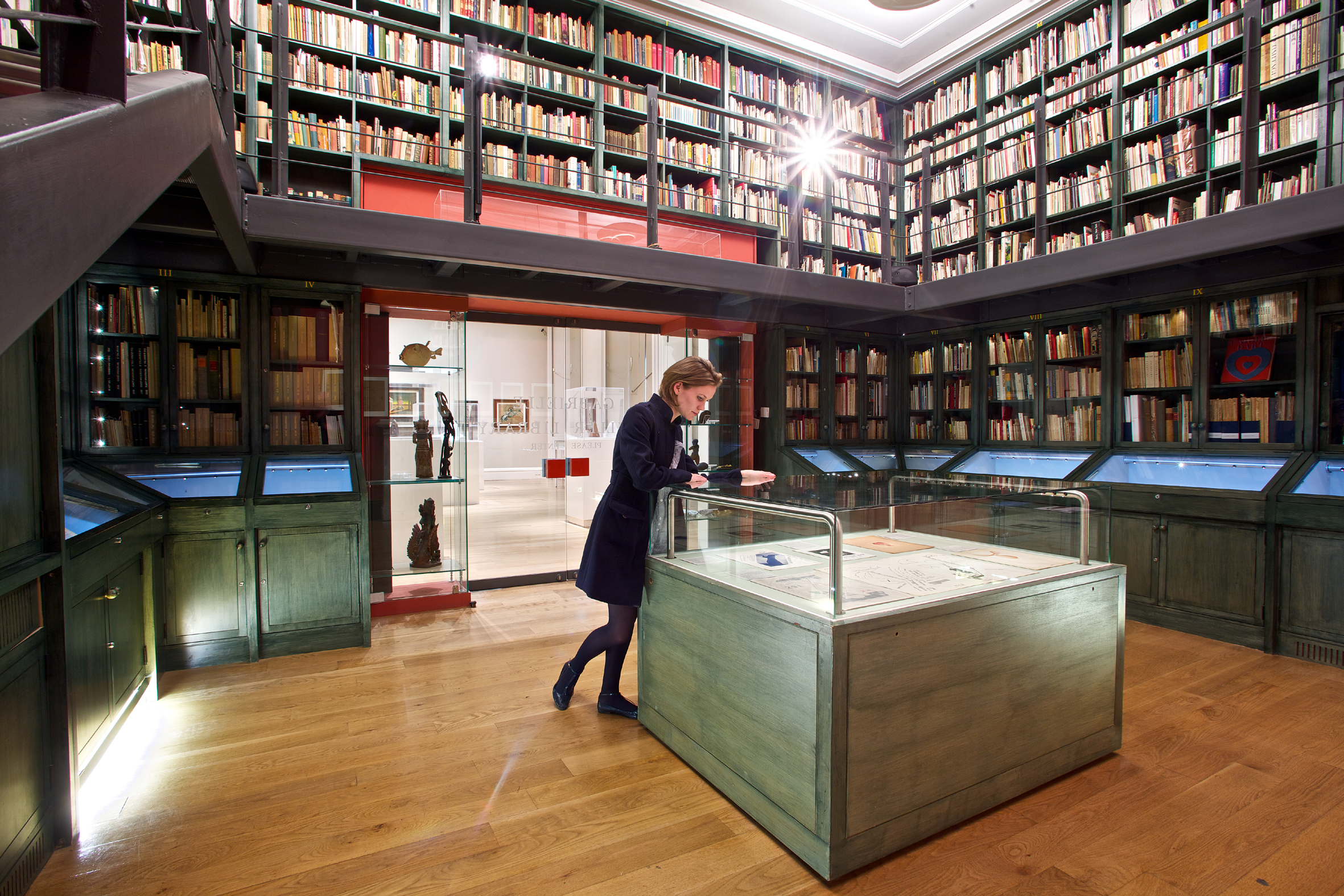
Modern Two, Keiller Library

Modern Two (formerly the Dean Gallery) is home to a changing programme of world-class exhibitions and displays drawn from the permanent collection. On permanent display is a recreation of the sculptor Eduardo Paolozzi's studio, as well as his 7.3-metre-tall (24 ft) sculpture, Vulcan, that dominates the café. Modern Two is also home to the gallery's world-famous collection of Surrealism, including works by Salvador Dalí, René Magritte and Alberto Giacometti. The building houses a library, archive and special books collection. The library's great strengths are Dada and Surrealism, early twentieth century artists and contemporary Scottish art. The archive contains over 120 holdings relating to twentieth and twenty-first century artists, collectors and art organisations, including the gallery's own papers. The archive holds one of the world's best collections of Dada and Surrealist material, largely made up by the collections of Roland Penrose and Gabrielle Keiller. The special books collection contains over 2,500 artist books and limited edition livres d’artiste, again with a main focus on Dada and Surrealism, but also books by other major artists from the twentieth century including Oskar Kokoschka's Die Träumenden Knaben (1917) and Henri Matisse's Jazz (1947). This material is available to the public in the reading room, open to the public by appointment. There are regular changing displays in the Gabrielle Keiller library to showcase items from these collections.

=== Outdoor sculpture ===
Modern One and Two are set in extensive parkland, where visitors can discover sculpture by such artists as Ian Hamilton Finlay, Barbara Hepworth, Henry Moore, George Rickey, Rachel Whiteread, Richard Long and Nathan Coley. The lawn to the front of Modern One was re-landscaped in 2002 to a design by Charles Jencks. This dramatic work, or Landform, comprises a stepped, serpentine mound reflected in three crescent-shaped pools of water. The façade of Modern One is home to Martin Creed's Work No. 975, EVERYTHING IS GOING TO BE ALRIGHT. Modern One backs on to the Water of Leith river and walkway, which can be accessed by a long flight of steep steps behind the Gallery.

Selected works in the sculpture gardens

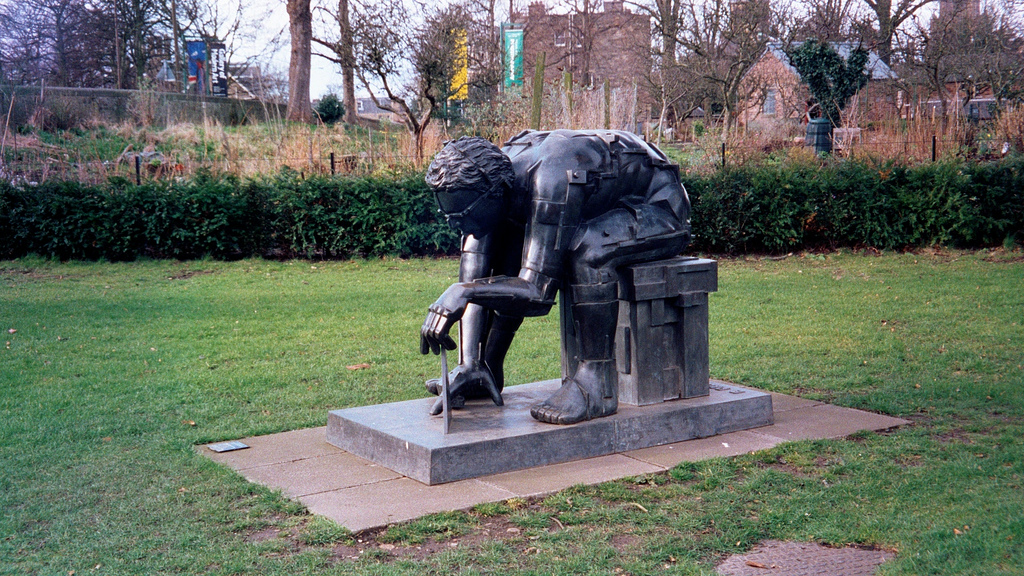
Master of the Universe (Eduardo Paolozzi)

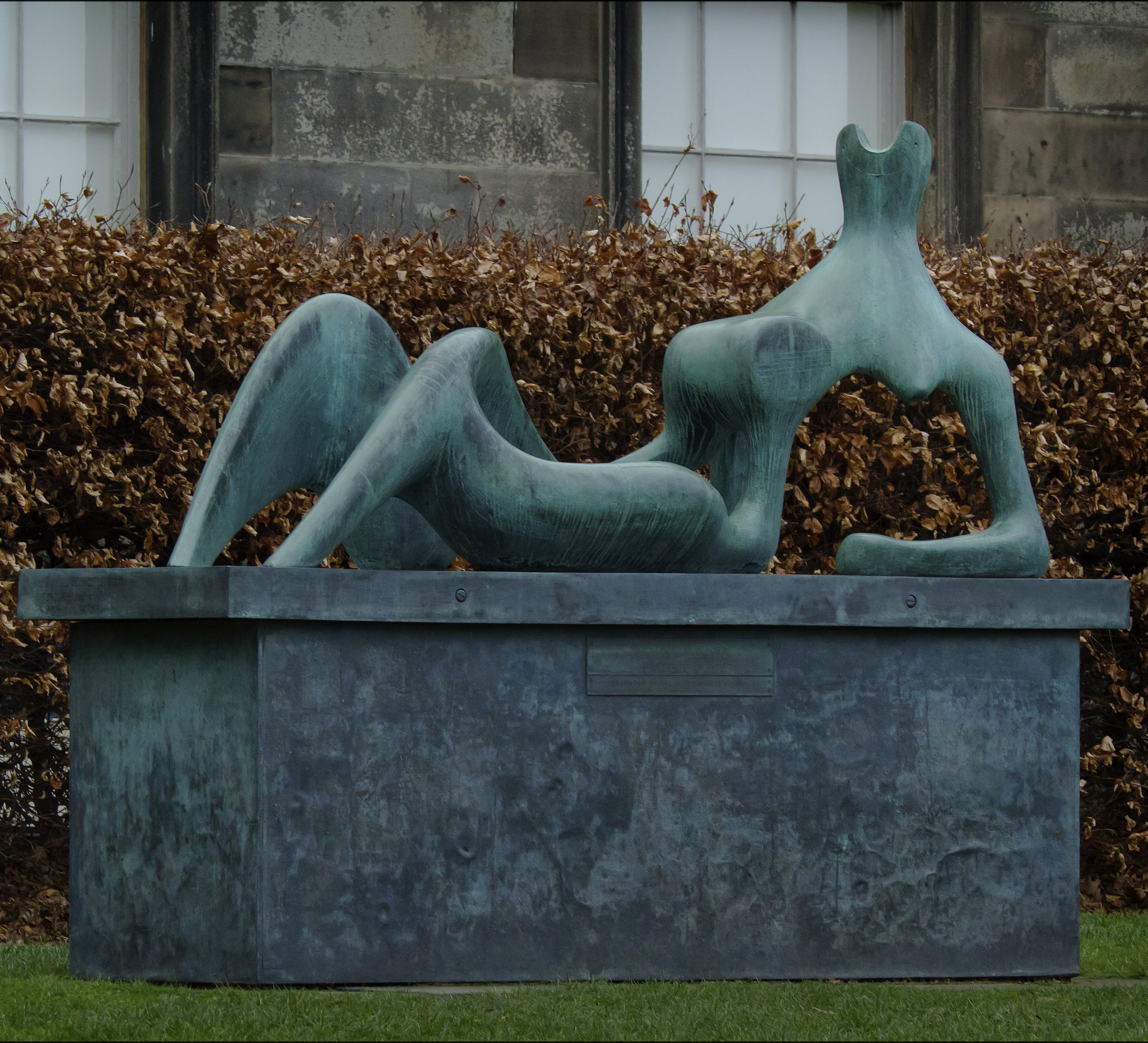
Reclining Figure: Festival (Henry Moore, 1951)

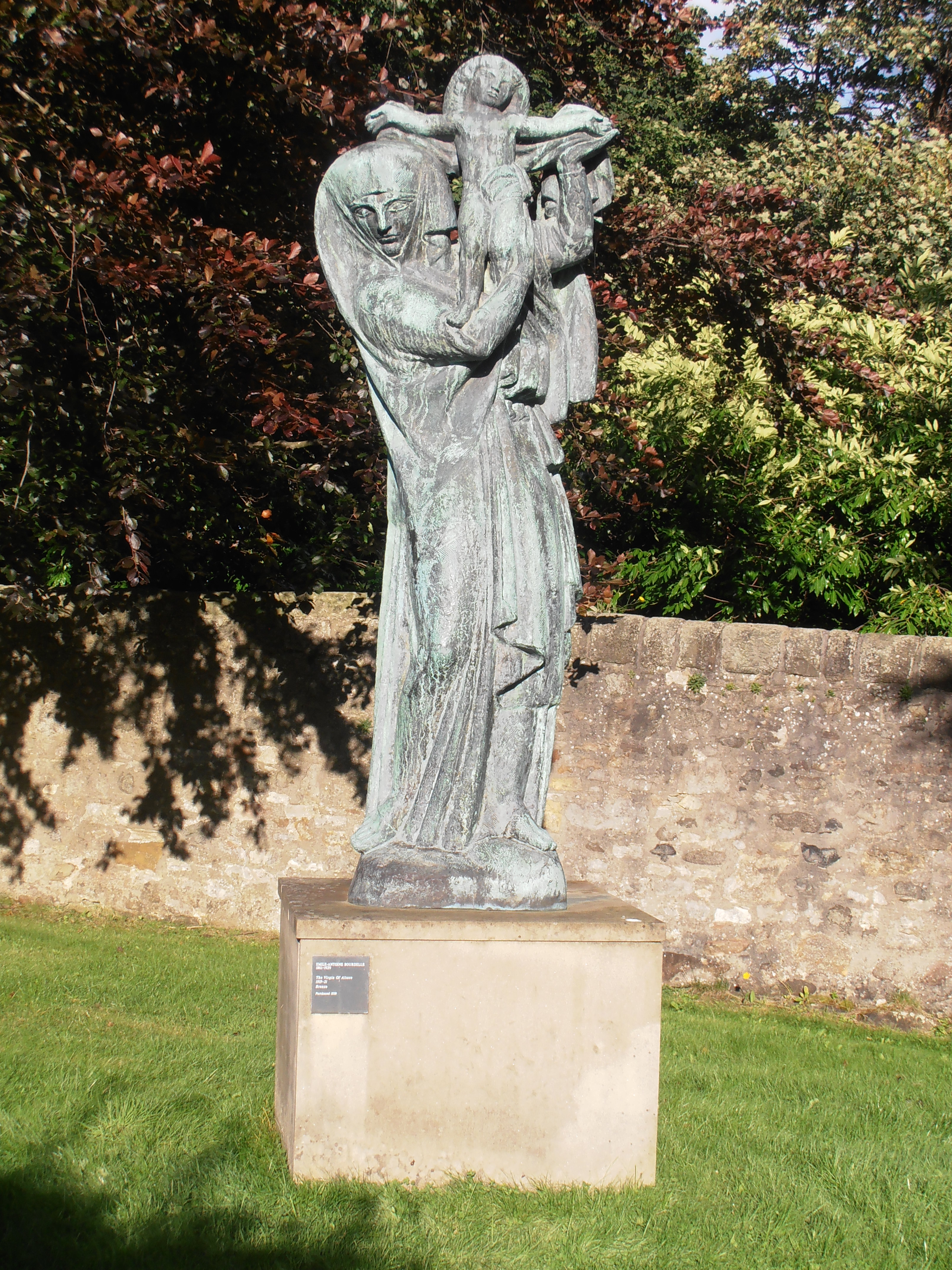
La Vierge d'Alsace (Antoine Bourdelle, 1922)

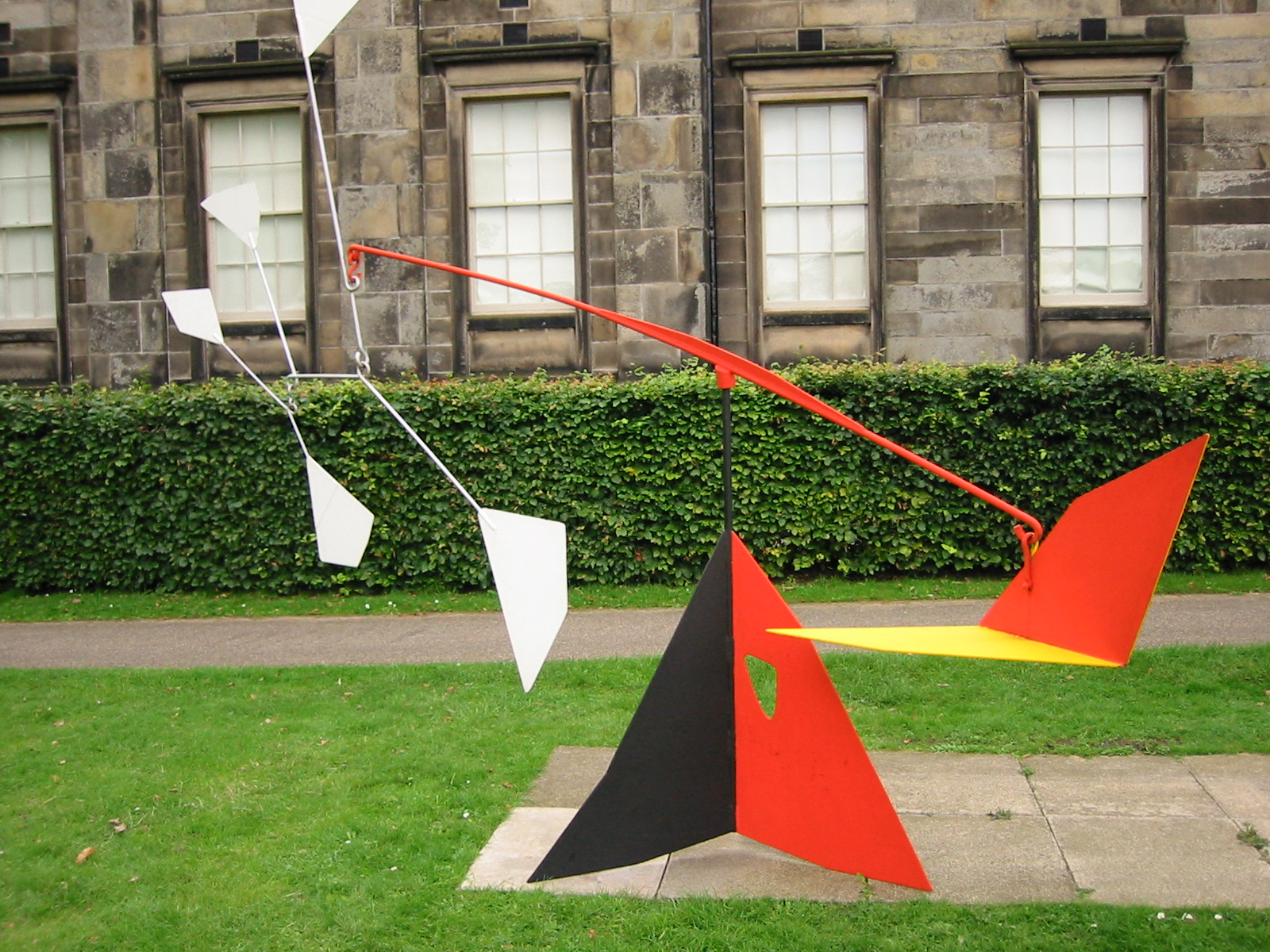
L'Empennage (Alexander Calder, 1953)

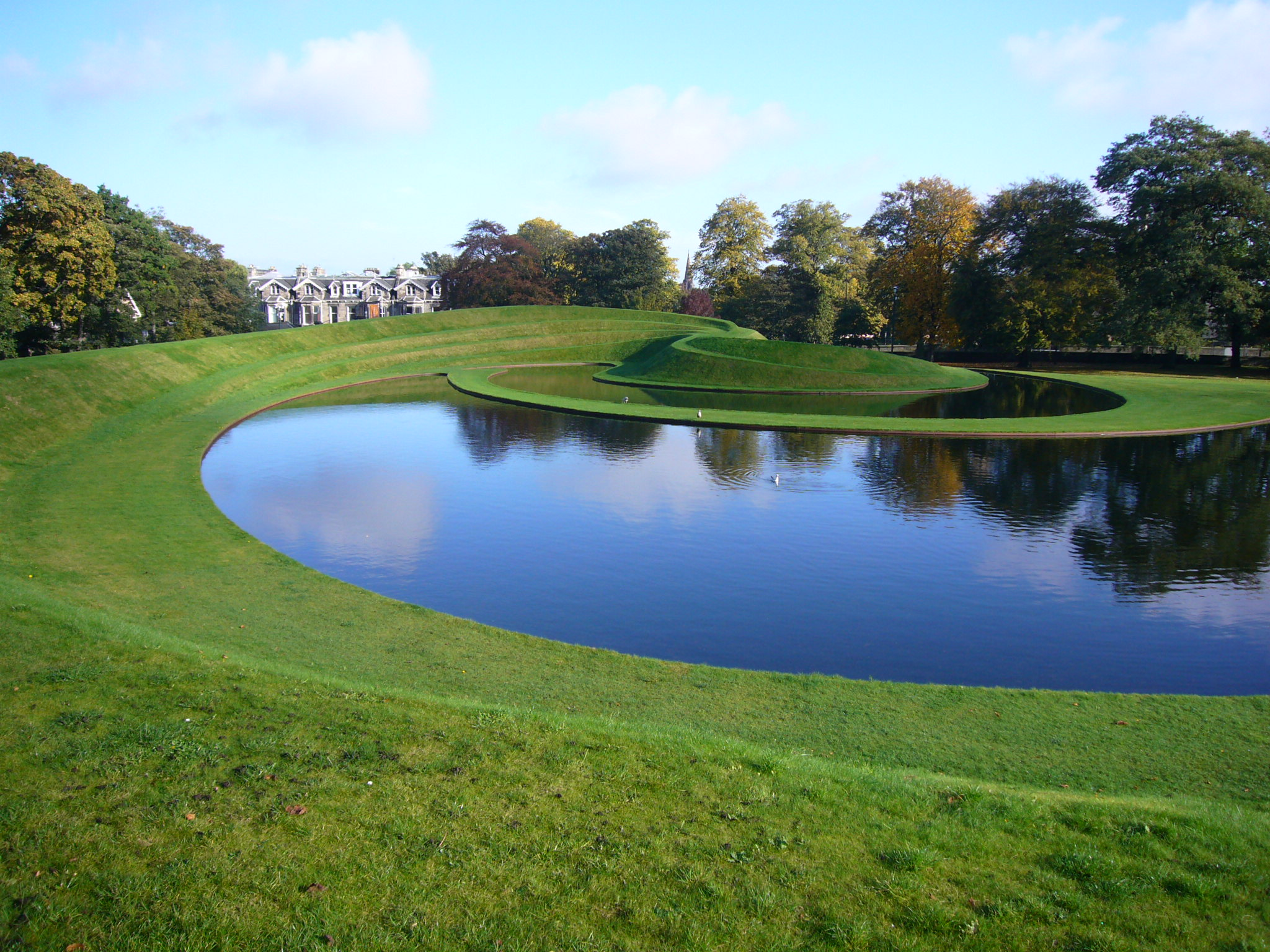
Landform Ueda (Charles Jencks, 2002)

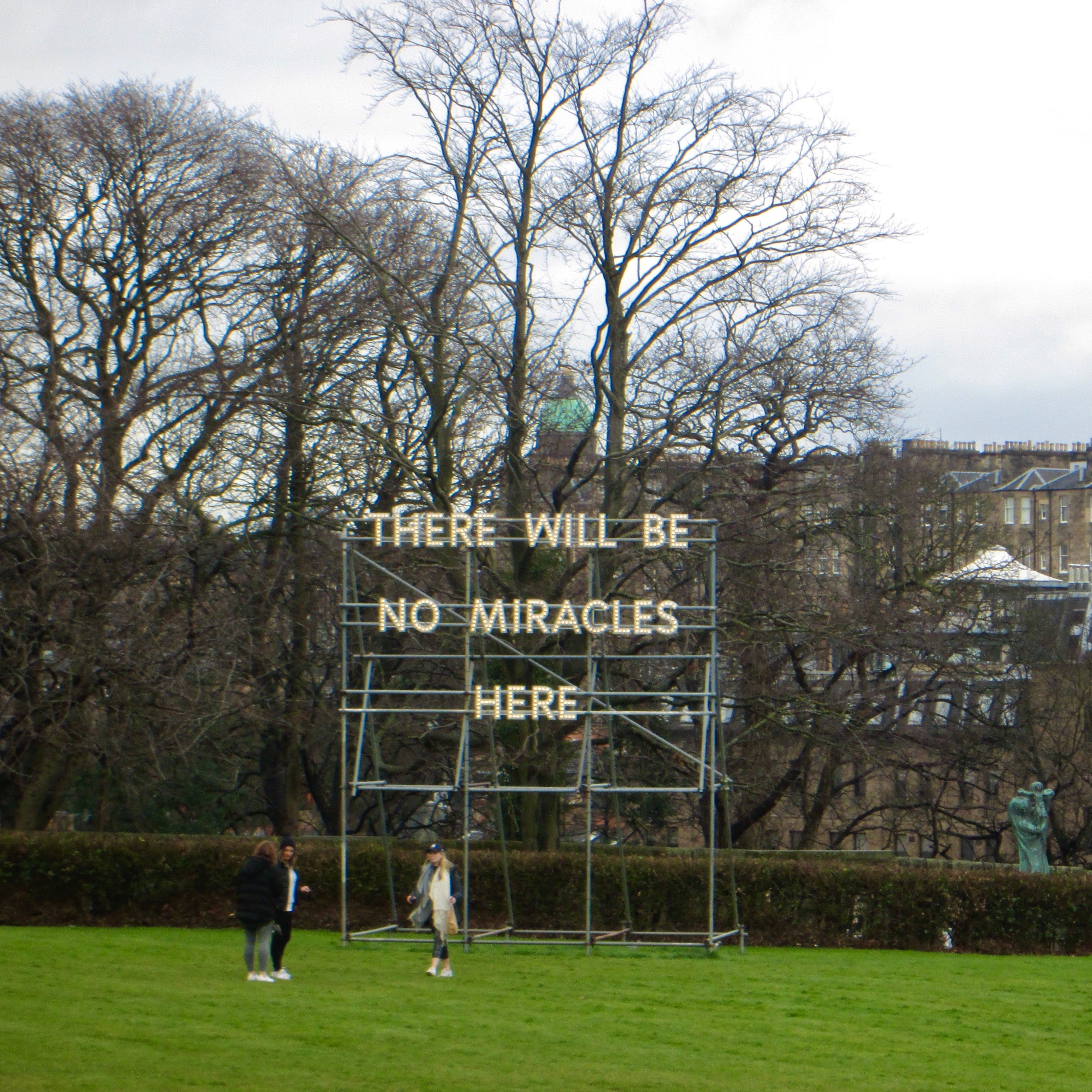
There Will Be No Miracles Here (Nathan Coley)

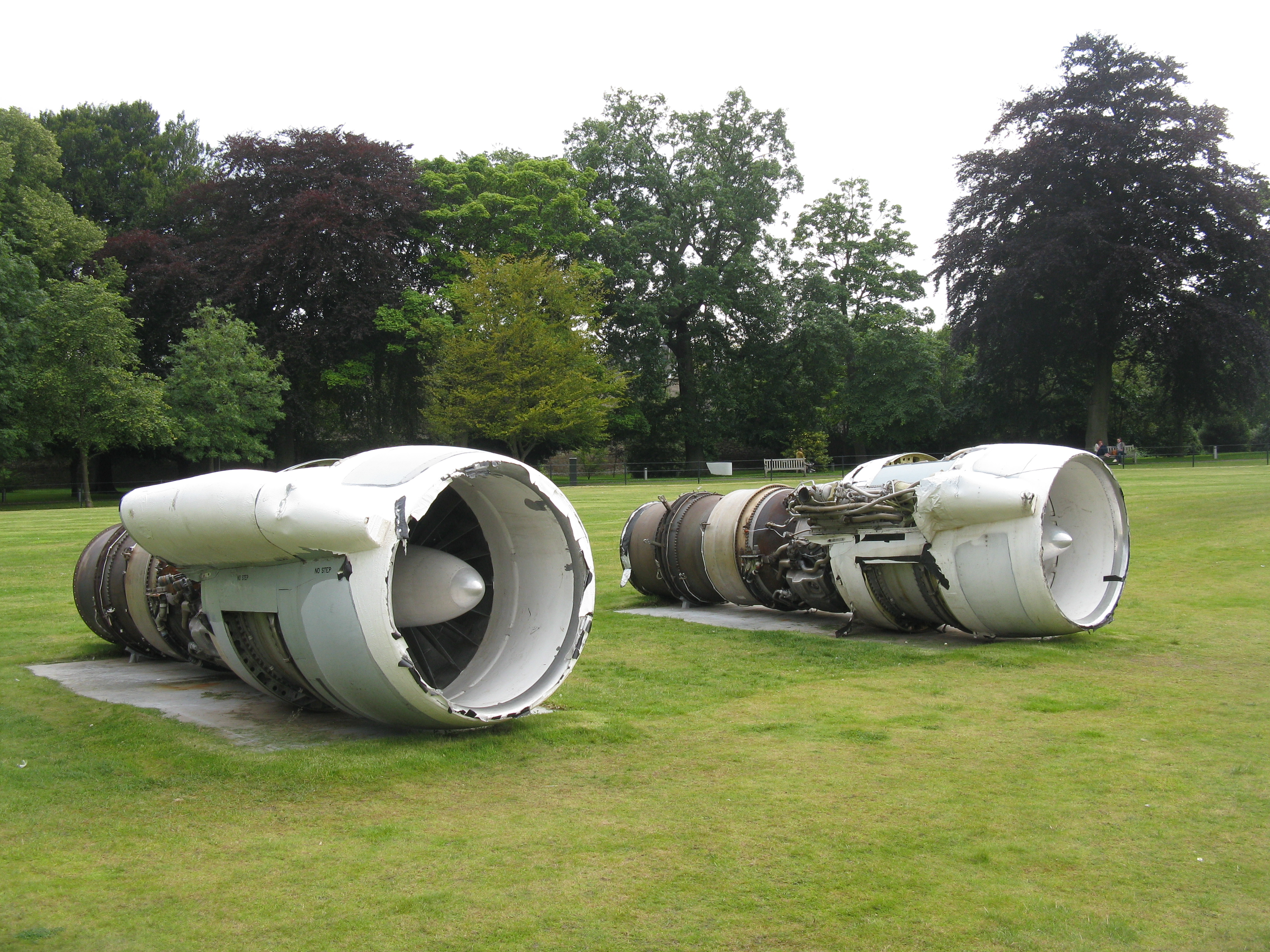
Untitled (Roger Hiorns, 2010)

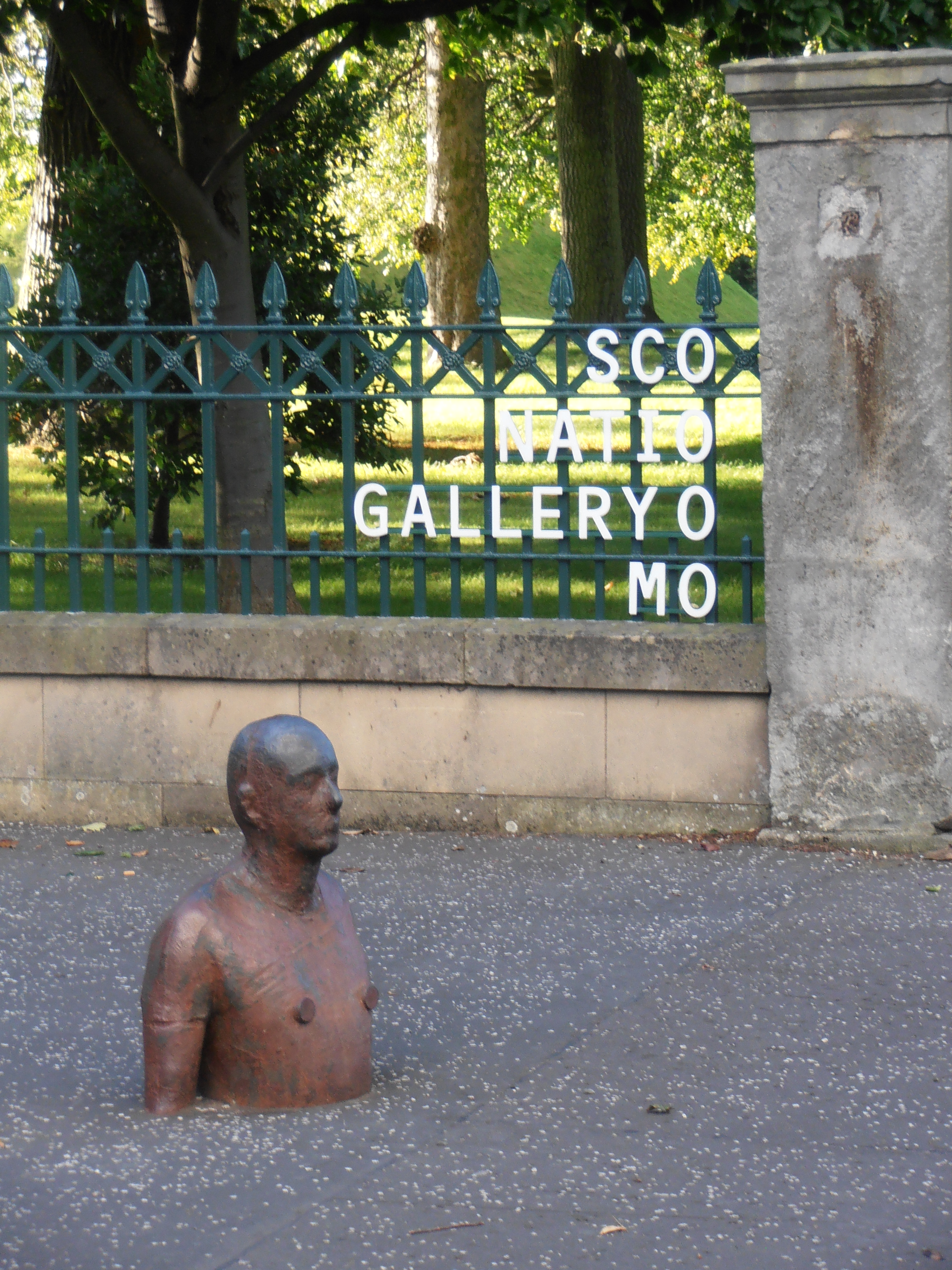
6 Times (Antony Gormley, 2010)

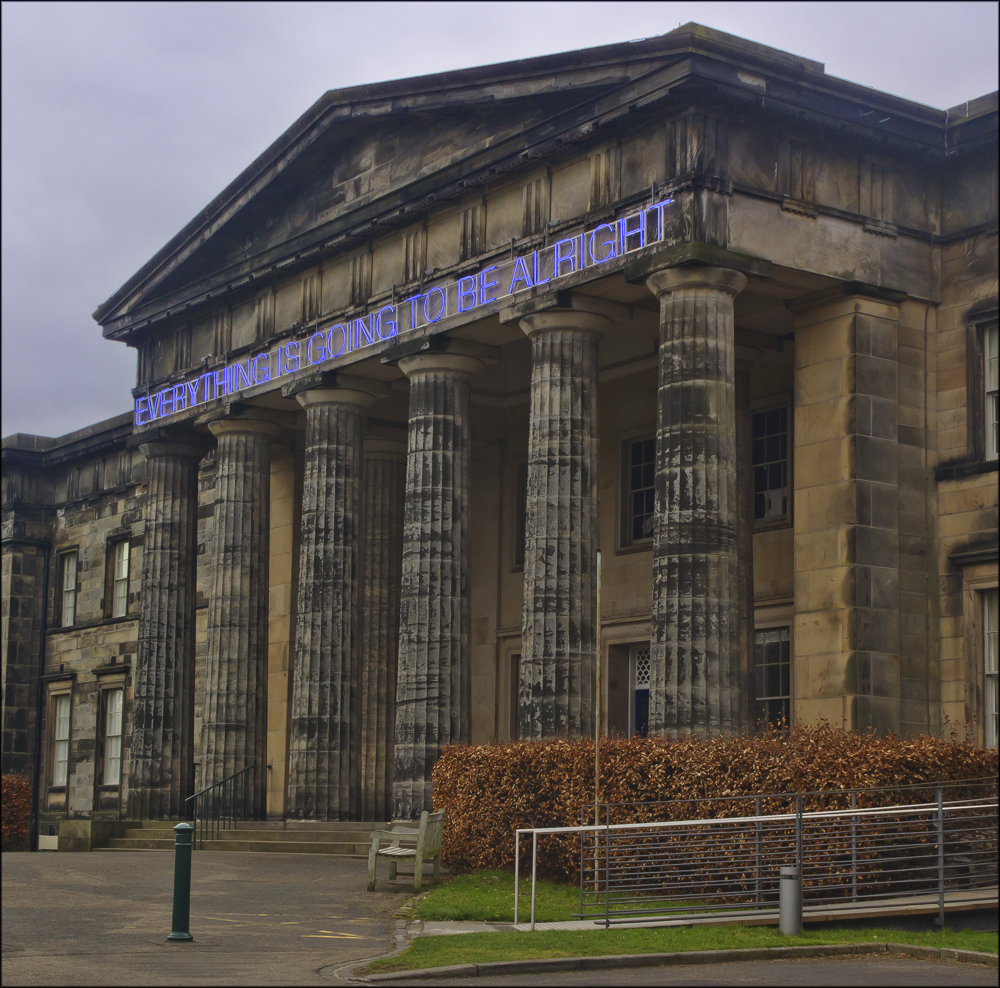
Work No. 975, Everything is going to be alright (Martin Creed, 2009)

== Governance ==
The Modern's director is Simon Groom, who was appointed in 2007.
