= Visionary architecture =

Building design only on paper

Visionary architecture is a design that only exists on paper or displays idealistic or impractical qualities. The term originated from an exhibit at the Museum of Modern Art in 1960. Visionary architects are also known as paper architects because their improbable works exist only as drawings, collages, or models. Their designs show unique, creative concepts that are unrealistic or impossible except in the design environment.

Traditionally, the term visionary refers to a person who has visions or sees things that do not exist in the real world, such as a saint or someone who is mentally unbalanced. Thus, visionary architecture as a label is somewhat pejorative and has been used to marginalize paper architects from the mainstream. However, an article in Forbes noted, "Whereas ordinary architecture literally shapes the way in which we live, unrealized plans and models provide infrastructure for our collective imagination. They are meeting places for conversation."

Visionary architecture was discussed and celebrated at the Architecture of Disbelief symposium at Cornell University in 2008. Prominent modern and pre-modern visionary architects include Etienne-Louis Boullée, Peter Eisenman, Zaha Hadid, Rem Koolhaas, Daniel Libeskind, Antonio Sant'Elia, and Lebbeus Woods.

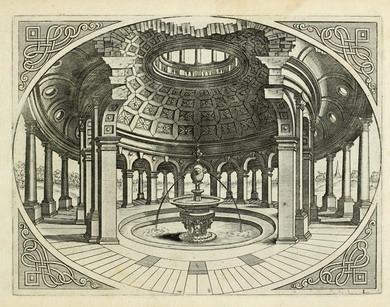
Rotunda Project by Hans Vredeman de Vries

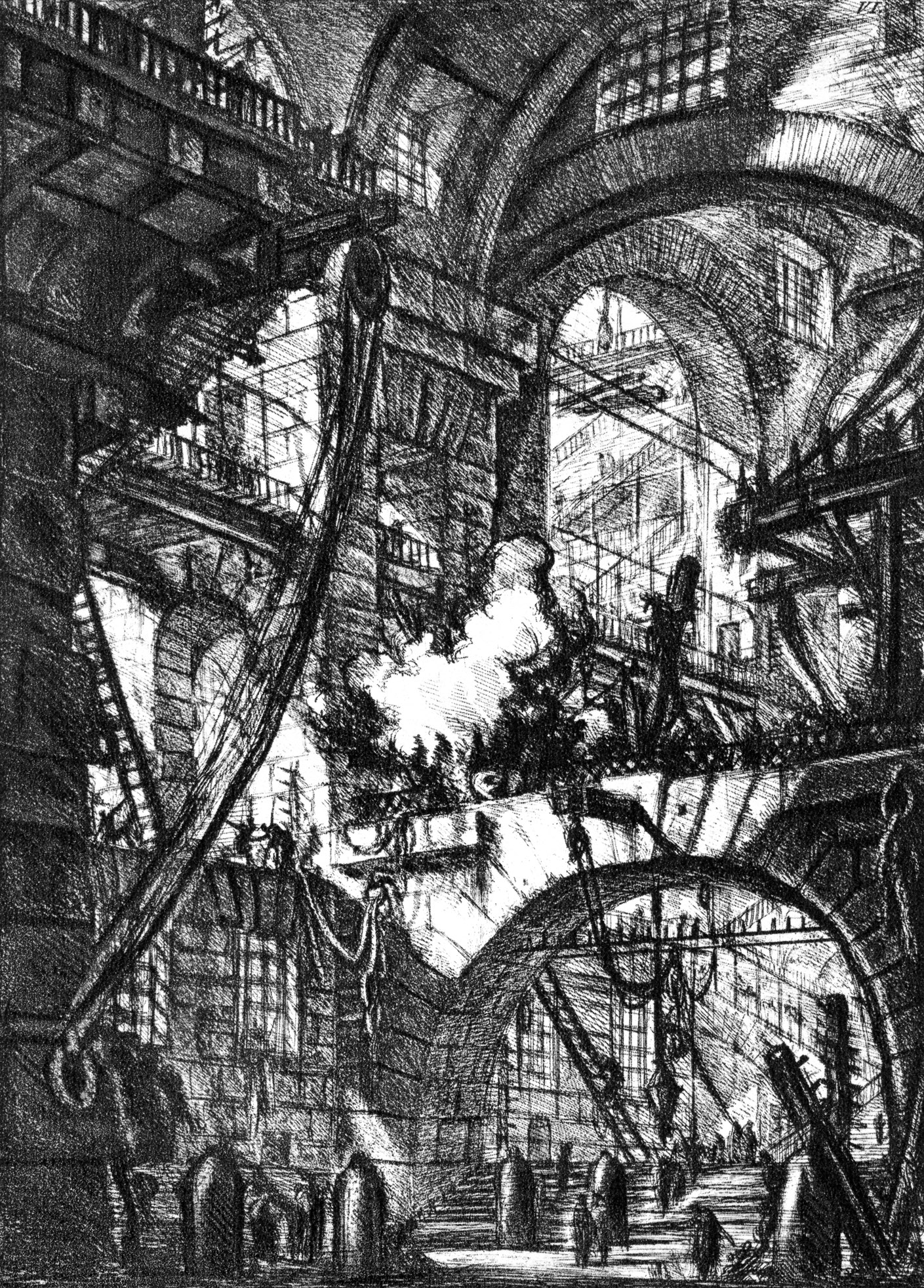
The Smoking Fire from The Imaginary Prisons by Giovanni Battista Piranesi, 1761 edition

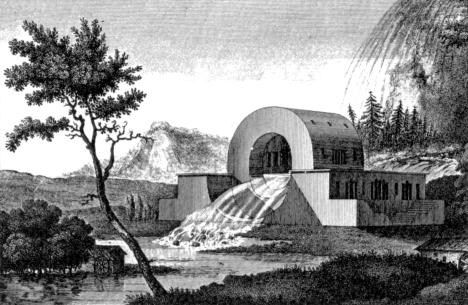
House for the Waterworks Director by Claude Nicolas Ledoux, c. 1773 to 1779

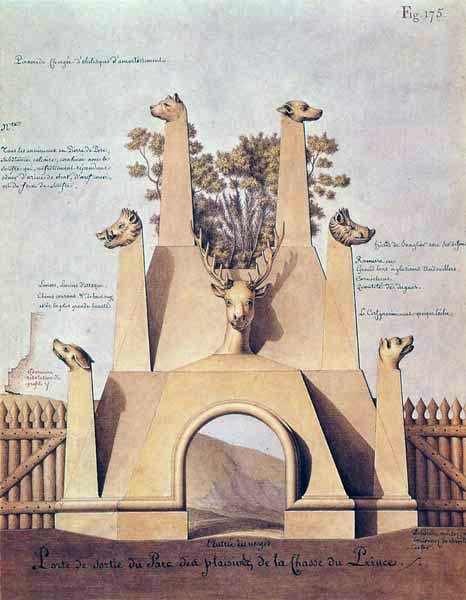
Jean-Jacques Lequeu's design for the gate of a hunting ground, c. 1800

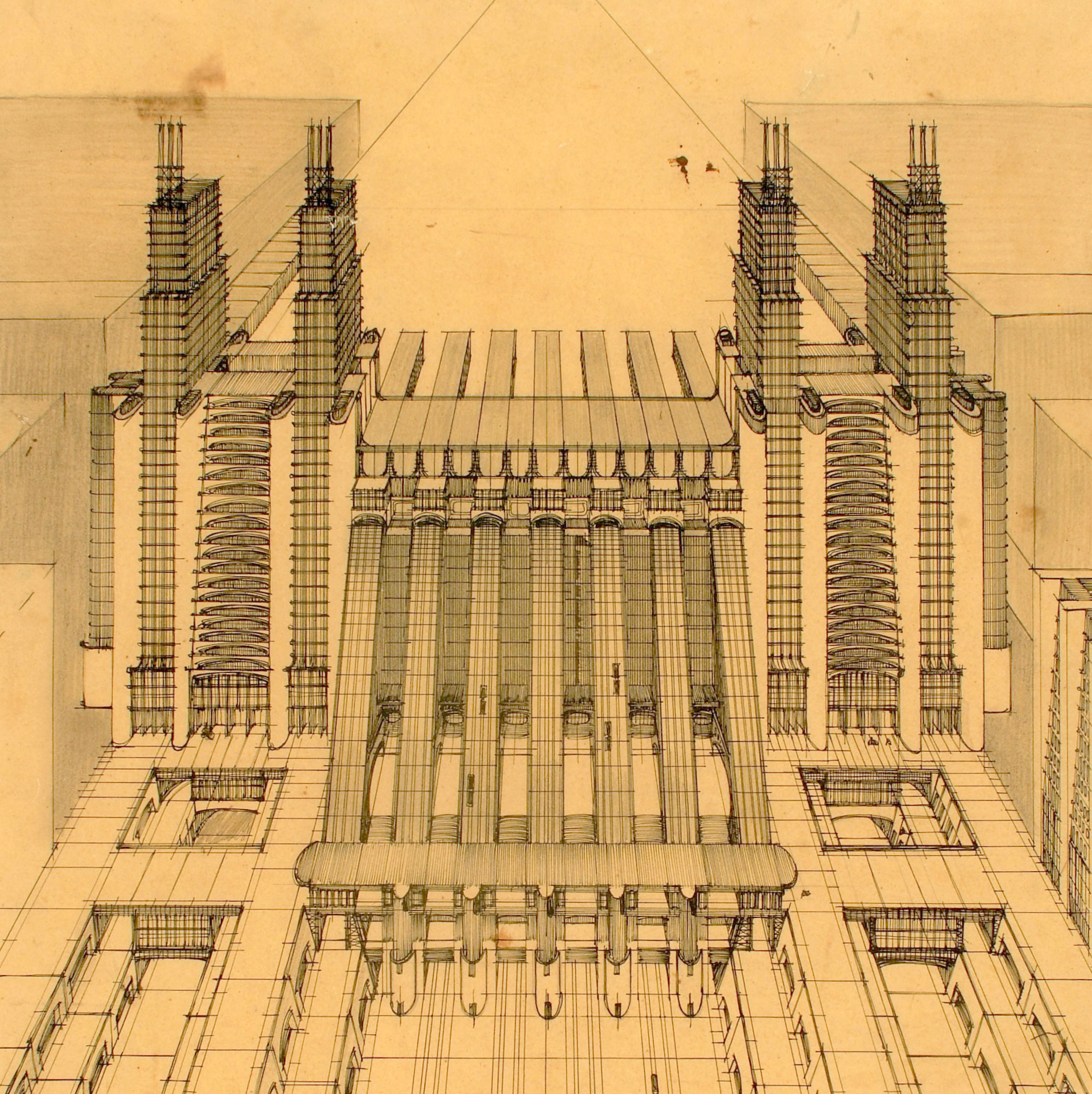
Stazione by Antonio Sant'Elia

== History and early works ==
During the Renaissance, building styles evolved rapidly because of the introduction of perspective. This discovery allowed architects to experiment with imaginary architectural scenes. While many architects wrote on the subject, others articulated their concepts and ideas in their drawings. In the 16th century, a Dutch painter and architect, Jan Vredeman de Vries, produced numerous engravings that portrayed new forms of architecture. His architectural designs were pure fantasy and imagination—and avant-garde architectural spaces.

Most architects imagine, see, and define buildings by fabricating models that can be scaled up and down, turning abstract architectural sketches into solid three-dimensional buildings. When turned into scaled models, visionary designs were considered utopian and fantastic. Rather than bringing the building into existence, visionary architects use scale models to make the building speak through a sense of fantasy and symbolic meanings.

Some visionary architects skipped the model process entirely, believing that drawing is "the highest form and clearest expression of architecture." Giovanni Battista Piranesi was one of the greatest printmakers of the 18th century. Piranesi made prints of his architectural drawings that show his mastery of imagined spaces. Piranesi's drawings are visionary architecture because they included unique and intricate details that were only achievable in drawings and would be lost in translation to physical structures. For example, his Carceri d'invenzione or Imaginary Prisons from 1745 depicts labyrinthine monumental spaces and mysterious machines.

Visionary architecture of the 18th century centered around projects of immense size that "defied both man's comprehension and his building techniques." Claude Nicolas Ledoux is known for his utopian designs, including the City of Chaux around the Royal Saltworks at Arc-et-Senans. Ledoux developed an entire master plan for Chaux, along with architectural drawings, elevations, and sections of various individual buildings. Ledoux also designed a tube-shaped house for the director of the waterworks by the Loire river, c. 1773 to 1779.

Jean-Jacques Lequeu is one of the more eccentric and shocking of the early visionary architects. After the French Revolution ended his chance to become a palace architect, he worked as a civil servant, cartographer, surveyor, and draftsman. However, he spent most of his time preparing an unpublished treatise, Architecture Civile, which features ornaments, fragments of architectural drawings, and a series of fanciful architectural designs. These designs typically show an elevation or section of a building but rarely an entire design. One of his visionary designs was a stable shaped like a cow.

Étienne-Louis Boullée was an 18th-century visionary neo-classical architect. He was also an influential architectural theorist because he taught at the École Nationale des Ponts et Chaussées and elsewhere for fifty years. Later in his career, Boullée's designs showed an abstraction of geometric forms, removing all unnecessary ornamentation and inflating geometric shapes to a huge scale. In his La Théorie Des Corps, he discussed the properties of geometric forms such as the cube, cylinder, pyramid, and sphere and their effect on the senses. He believed the sphere was the "ideal form".

The early motion picture industry impacted architecture, especially the films Metropolis and Just Imagine, with their elaborate, imaginative, and futuristic architectural sets. Hugh Ferriss is one visionary architect who was influenced by Hollywood. He included sixty of his drawings in his 1929 book The Metropolis of Tomorrow. Ferriss divided his book into three sections: Cities of Today, Projected Trends, and An Imaginary Metropolis. In the third section, he predicts a city with tall, looming skyscrapers and bridge dwellings that were impossible to build at the time.

In the 20th century, visionary architects surfaced in repressed societies where young architects had little hope of realizing their designs. Early 20th-century Visionary architecture is divided into three main movements: German expressionism, Italian futurism, and Russian constructivism. The Germans turned to visionary paper architecture after World War I. One example is the Bruno Taut design for the Cosmic Carousel in 1920, a spherical structure with radar-like propellers. Antonio Sant'Elia was an influencer of the futurism movement in Italy; although most of his work was on paper and was never built. He designed mountainous buildings with bridges and towers connecting spaces.

Russian constructivism also emerged after World War I, and leaned toward "openwork, pavilion-like structures with strident placards and public-address systems." Russian constructivist designs relate to 18th-century visionary architectural designs in "the overt symbolism of their various elements" and a tendency toward immense buildings. One outstanding example of this style is the Vesnin brothers' design for the Palace of the Soviets, with its immense size and mechanization through projections at each level. Another example, also by the Vesnin brothers, was the proposed building for Pravda covered in signboards and news communication instruments. In addition, Vladimir Tatlin designed a monument for the Third International or Communist International, a 1,300 feet (400 m) tall rotating spiral that wraps around Vera Mukhina’s Monument to Worker and Farmer. Tatlin's design recalled the metaphor for the Russian Revolution as a spiral.

In 1960, Arthur Drexler curated an exhibit at the Museum of Modern Art in New York City that showcased the designs of visionary architects. Drexler not only gave a name to visionary architecture, but he also called attention to the importance of this work. He organized the exhibit based on three themes: geometry, mountains and caves, and roads or bridges. The exhibition included architectural drawings of Le Corbusier, Louis Kahn, William Katavolos, Frederick John Kiesler, Hans Poelzig, Paolo Soleri, and Michael Webb.

The Metropolitan Museum of Art hosted the "Visionary Architects" exhibit in 1968. Jean Adhemar and J. C. Lemagny of the Bibliothèque Nationale de France in Paris, curated this exhibit. It included 147 architectural drawings of late 18th-century French architects who "rebelled against the traditional ideas of their contemporaries."

== Post-World War II ==
Visionary architecture expanded after World War II. During this time, visionary architects tended to create designs that either anticipated the future or exaggerated and distorted existing structures.

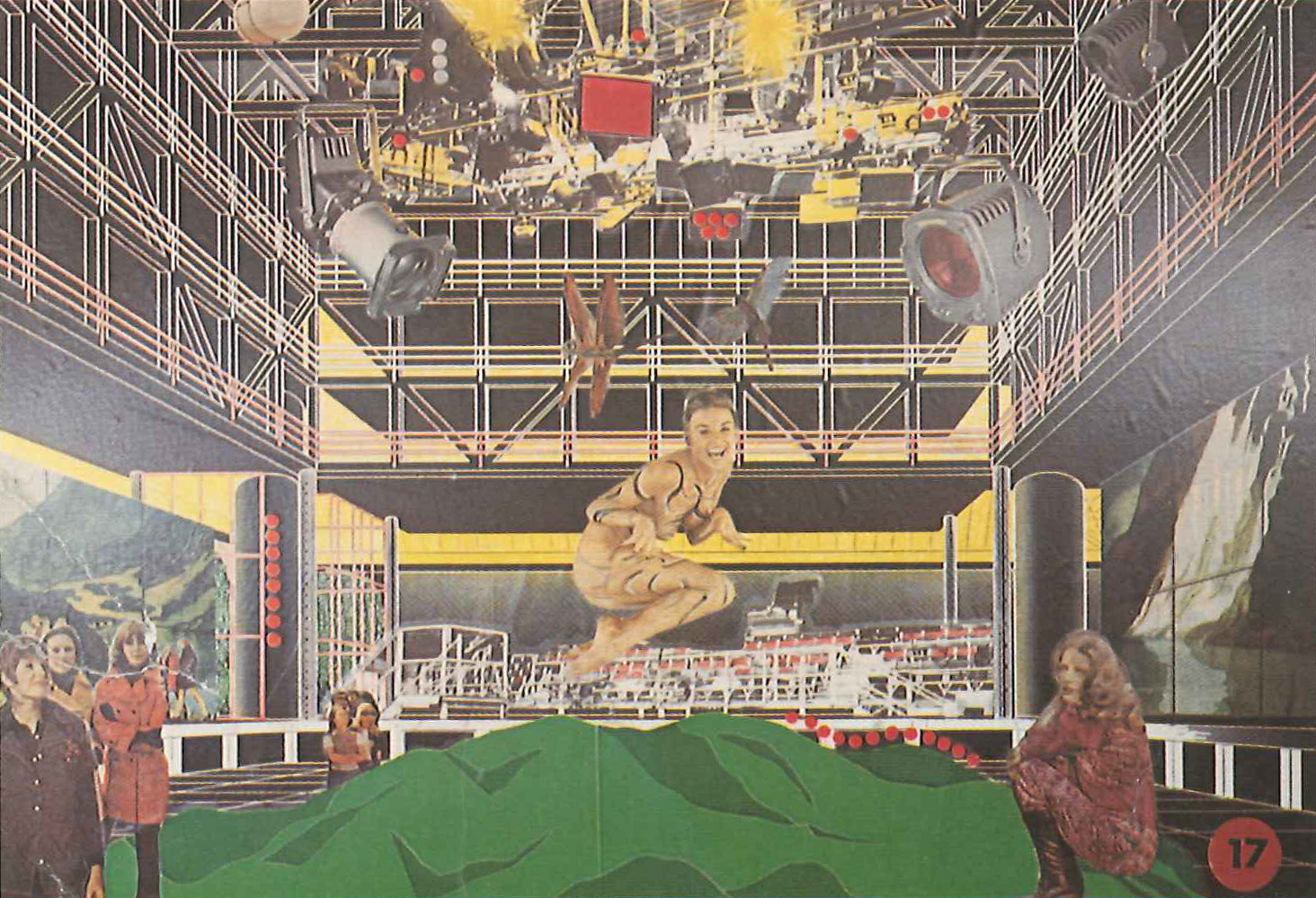
Trøndelag Theatre design contest entry by Ron Herron, Lars Fasting, and Per Kartvedt

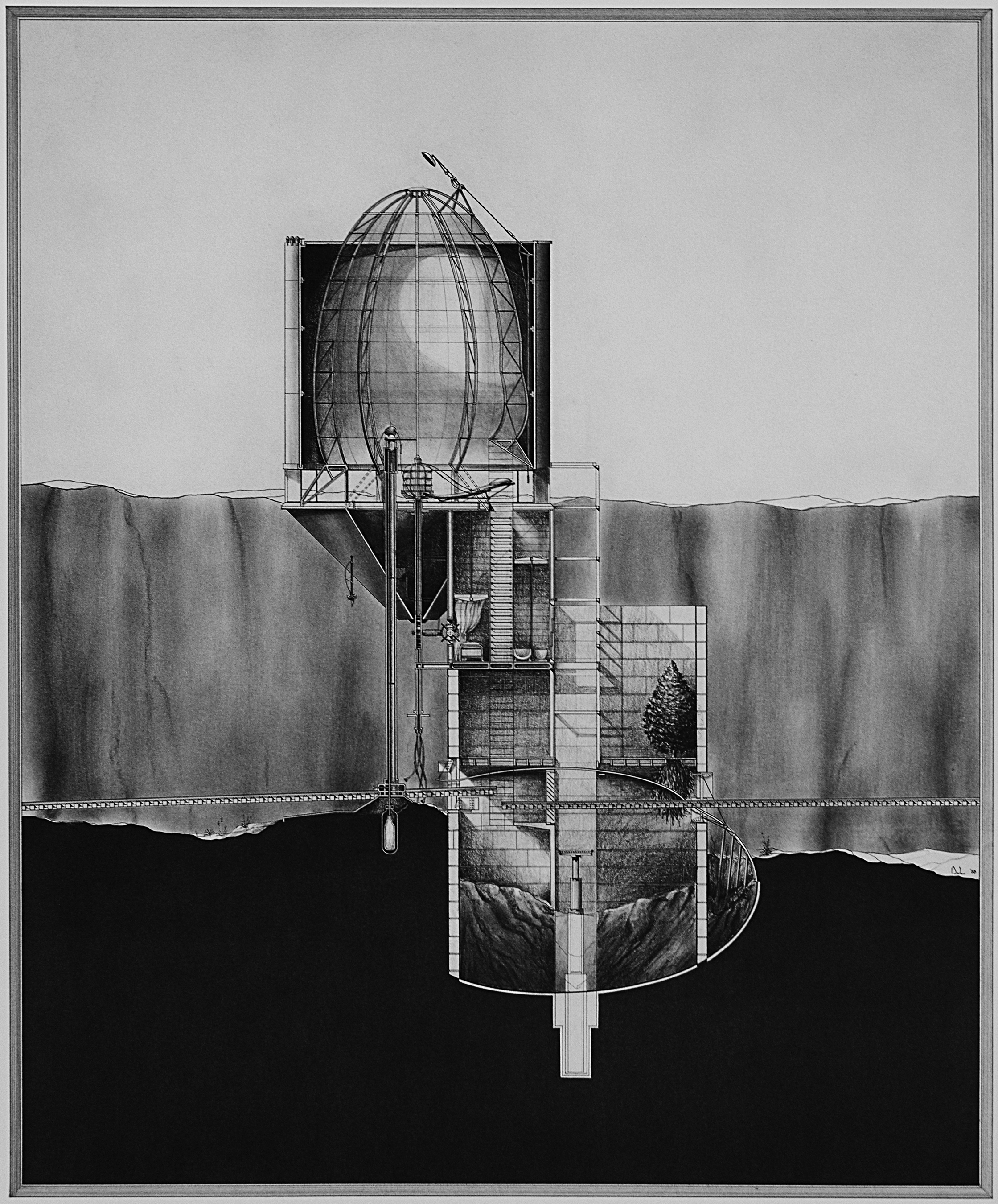
Oxygen House by Douglas Darden, 1988

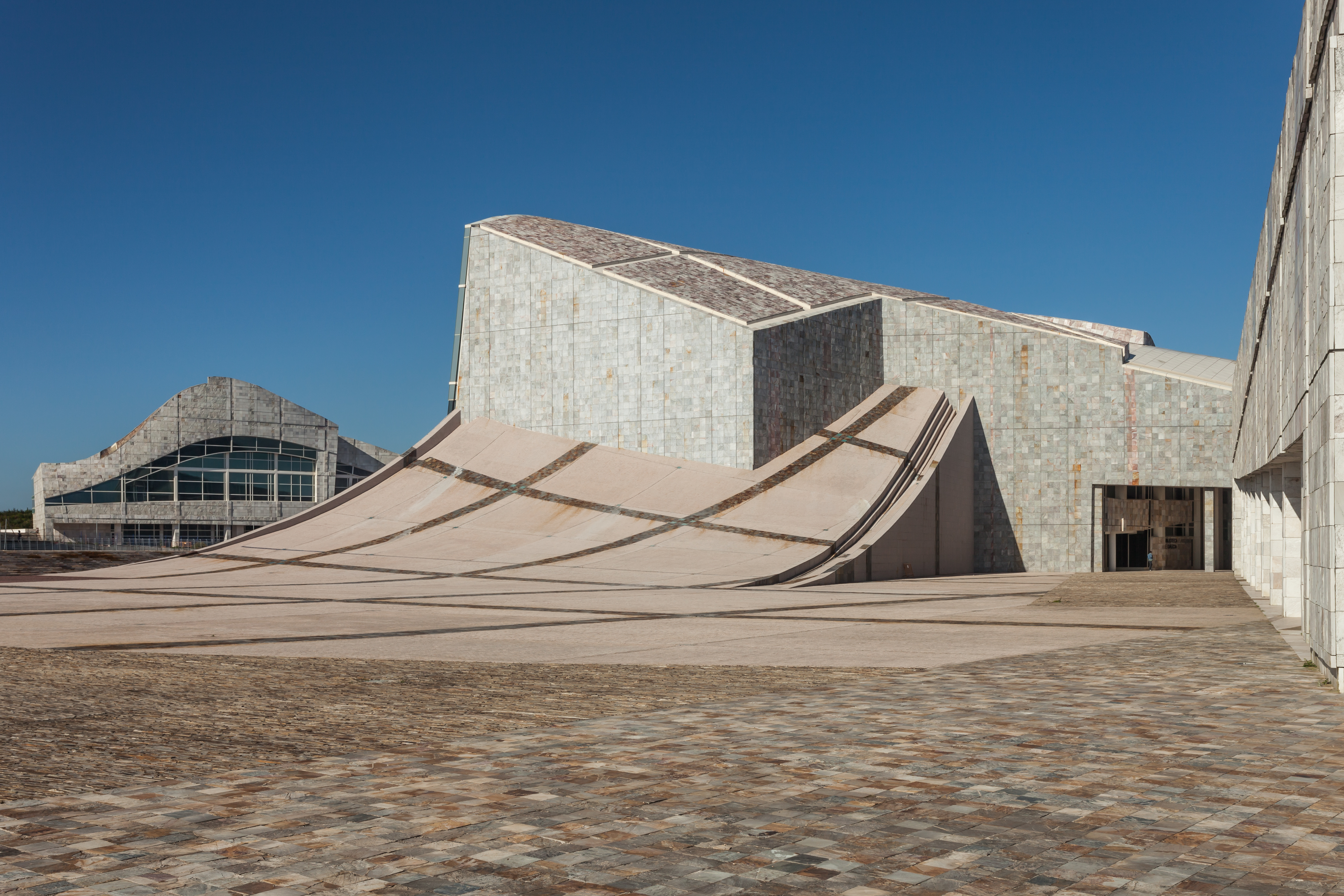
Library of Galicia in the City of the Culture, Santiago de Compostela by Peter Eisenman

=== The Archigram Group ===
The Archigram Group was a British art collective that explored avant-garde and visionary architecture from 1961 to 1974. It included Warren Chalk, Peter Cook, Dennis Crompton, David Greene, Ron Herron, and Michael Webb. Their work focused on the future of urban development without the restraint of a client. A visit to Cape Kennedy inspired many of their designs.

One of Archigram's most outlandish designs was Cook's Plug-In City from 1964. Cook envisioned moveable living units or pods easily relocated via communal cranes. The owner could move their pod around the city and plug it into the infrastructure at will. Herron came up with the Walking City, a city that did not have a fixed location because it could easily relocate by moving on its legs. Archigram's work was almost exclusively visionary; its only constructed designs were a swimming pool for Rod Stewart and a playground in Buckinghamshire.

=== Douglas Darden ===
After receiving a master's degree from the Harvard School of Design and attending the Parsons School of Design, Douglas Darden began his career by teaching and publishing works of paper architecture. His visionary designs showed what he referred to as narrative architecture—designs inspired by works of literature. One example is his design for Melvilla, inspired by his love of Moby-Dick by Herman Melville. Because his designs were often executed by working from anti-theses of architectural principles, Darden described his work as exploring the margin or the "underbelly." One of his best-known projects was the 1993 book, Condemned Building: An Architect's Pre-Text.

=== Peter Eisenman ===
Peter Eisenman is a deconstructivist theorist who believes that architecture should be disharmonious or even nonfunctional because this would "make people think rather than feel". He called his work "cardboard architecture" and once said, "I would never live in anything I design." He designed a series of experimental houses—several that were built—that showed the reality behind his statement. For example, House IV had a column that abutted the dining table and it was impossible to fit a double bed in the main bedroom because a glass strip ran through the center of the room.

His most ambitious design was the City of Culture in Santiago de Compostela, a huge cultural complex that echoes the forms of the nearby mountains, appearing to roll up from the landscape. Another project incorporating his visionary, deconstructivist style is the Memorial to the Murdered Jews of Europe in Berlin, Germany.

=== Hermann Finsterlin ===
Hermann Finsterlin is one of the most radical German expressionist architects, known for producing unbuildable and obscure buildings. His visionary drawings focused on perspectives, playing with unusual organic shapes. Finsterlin's architectural drawings are among the purest paper buildings ever developed and would require ingenious engineering to construct because his designs go against their form.

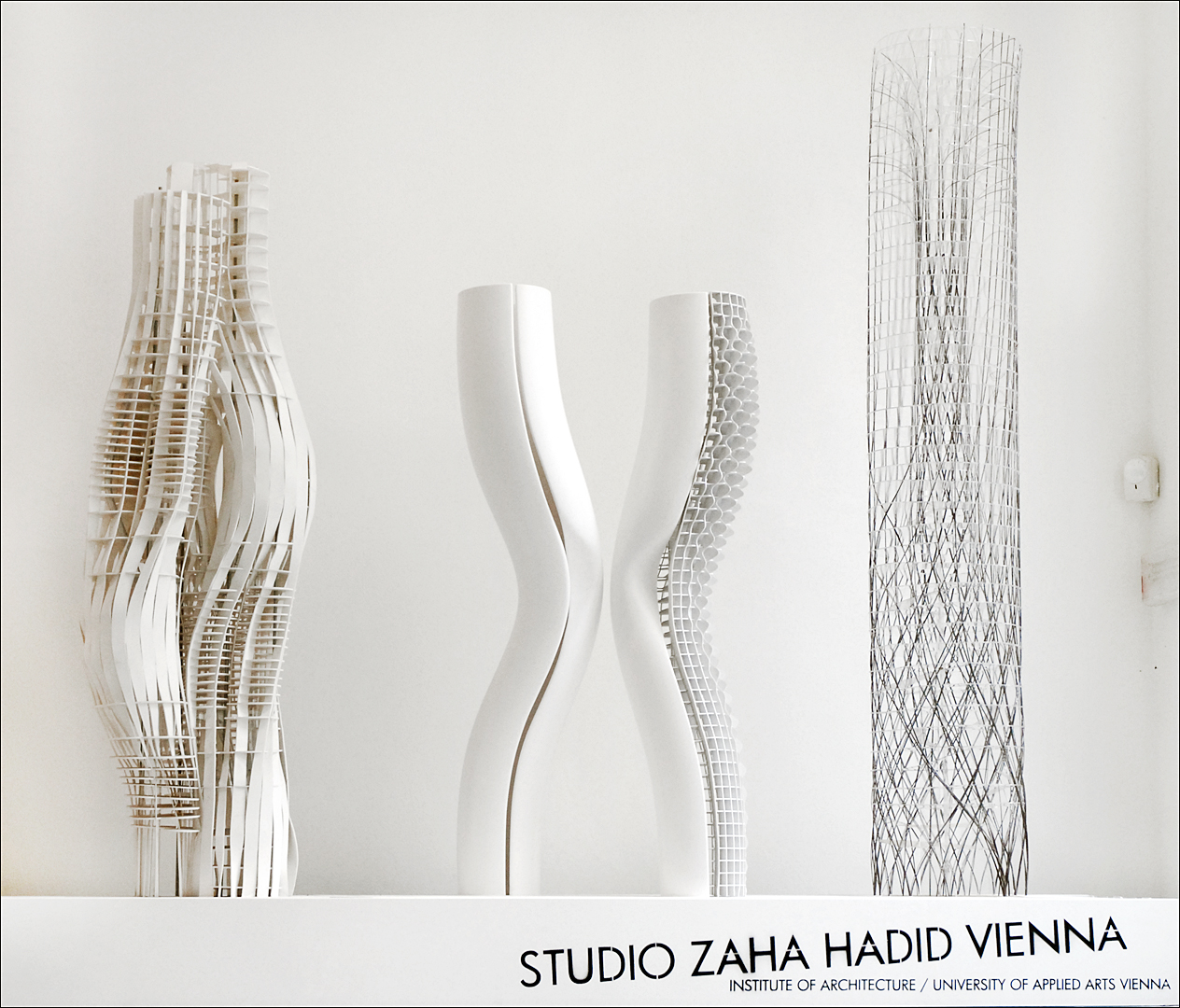
Zaha Hadid's designs for The Austrian Pavilion

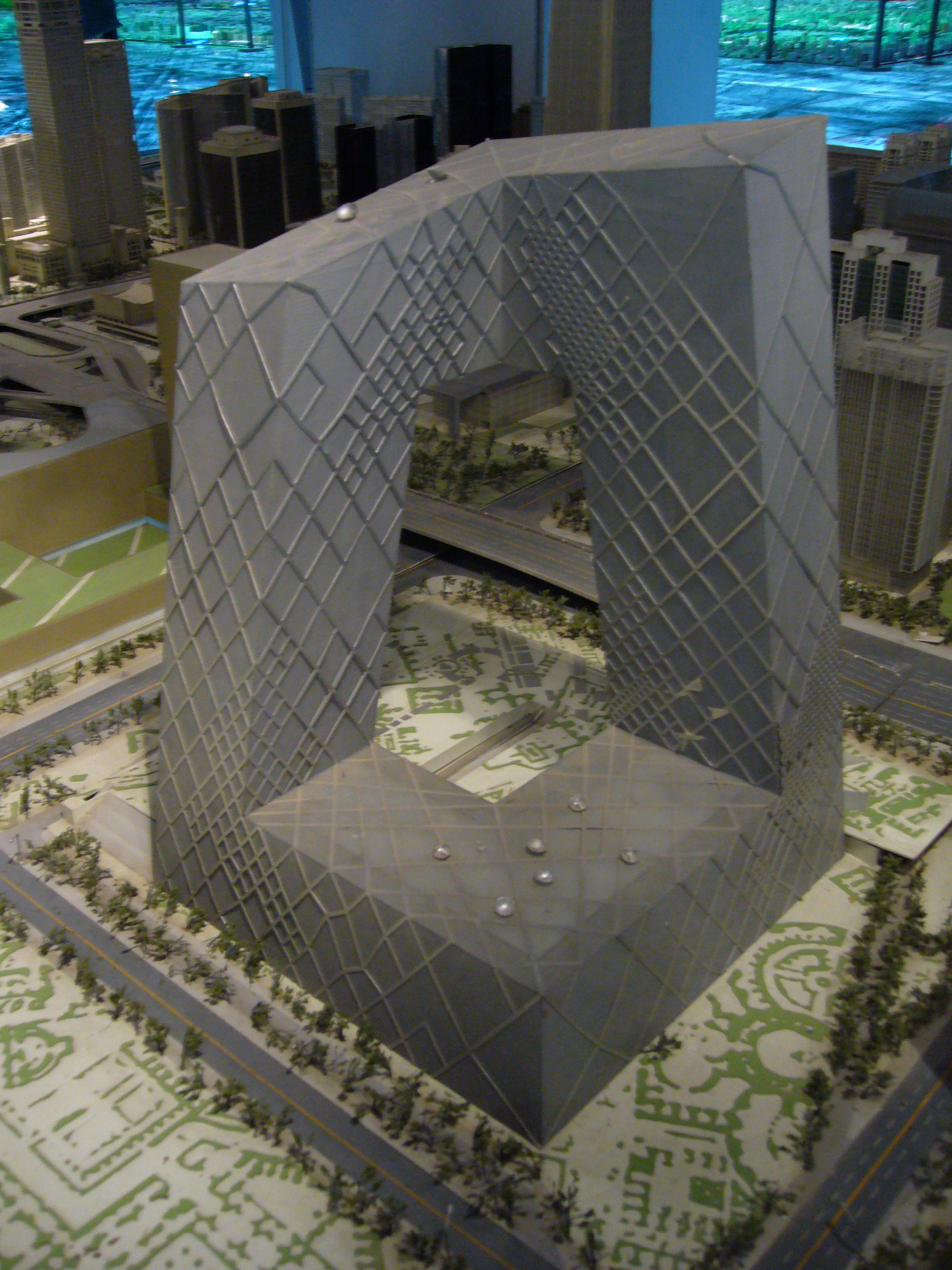
Design for the Chinese State TV Building in Beijing by Rem Koolhaas

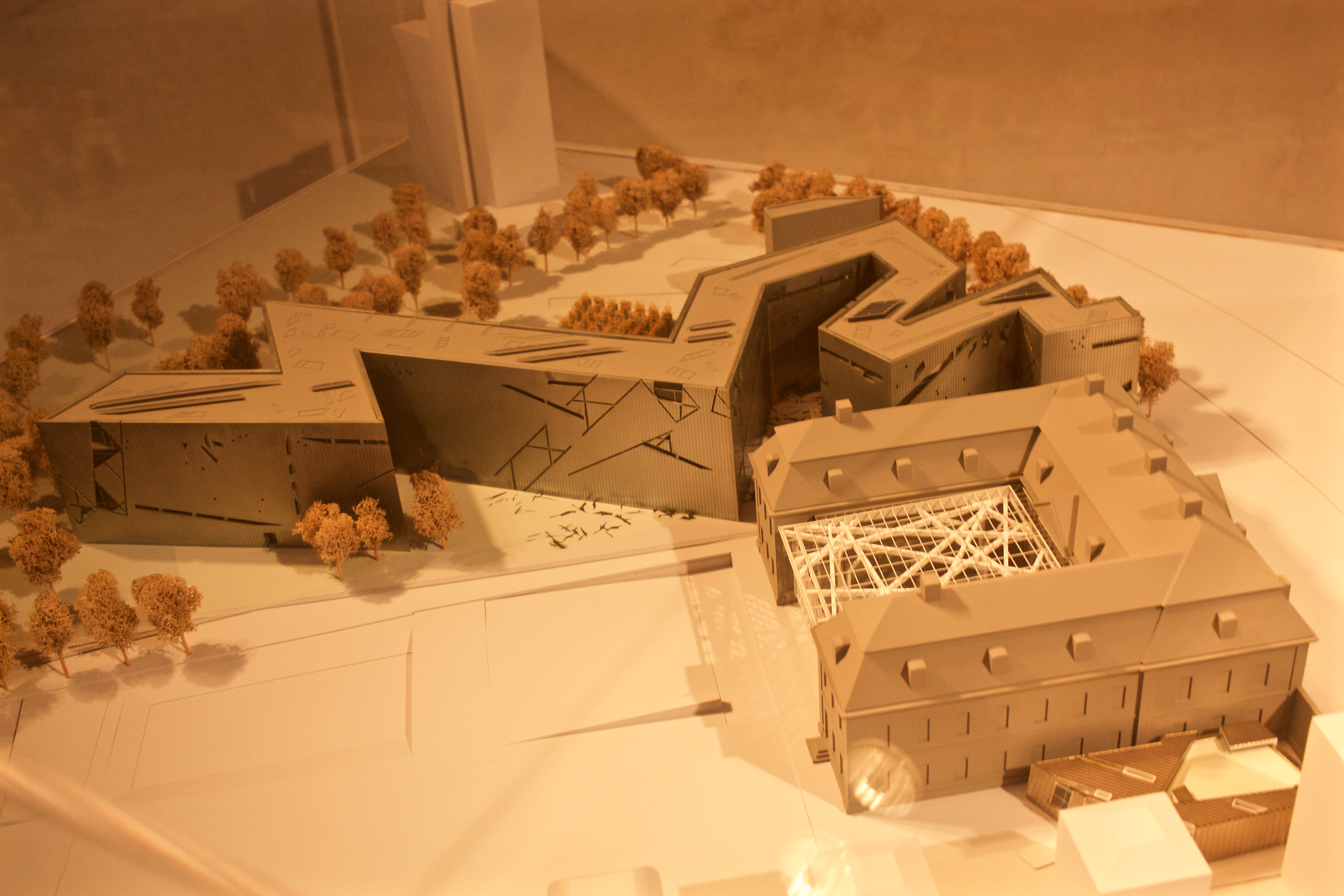
Model of the Jewish Museum Berlin by Daniel Libeskind

=== Zaha Hadid ===
Zaha Hadid was a British-Iraqi architect known for deconstructivist designs with fantastic shapes. Her geometric designs have a sense of movement, fragmentation, and instability. However, most of her designs from the 1980s and 1990s were not constructed. One of her significant buildings is the Lois & Richard Rosenthal Center for Contemporary Art in Cincinnati, Ohio, essentially "a vertical series of cubes and voids". She also designed the MAXXI museum of contemporary art and architecture in Rome, Italy.

=== Walter Jonas ===
Walter Jonas is a Swiss-German painter who designed Intrapolis for West Germany in the 1970s. Intrapolis consisted of housing units shaped like funnels and made of stacked concentric circles. Jonas said that his funnel-shaped buildings minimized ground contact and would "save valuable soil". West Germany never built Intrapolis because it lacked the funds. One writer notes, "Jonas's funnels question the assumption that urban residences ought to be refuges from the cities in which we live, and encourage us to consider more holistic options. The Intrapolis captivates us precisely because it's so bizarrely different from anything in our experience. It belongs to an alternate reality that we can visit to escape the built-in assumptions of our everyday environment."

=== Rem Koolhaas ===
Rem Koolhaas moved to Manhattan, New York in 1972 where he developed a fascination with the city. He began to examine the dynamics that constructed the city, resulting in his manifesto, Delirious New York: A Retroactive Manifesto for Manhattan, which outlines his theory of Manhattanism. Koolhaas saw a symbiotic relationship between Manhattan's "culture of congestion" and its architecture, arguing that the architecture generated the culture. His book is also a spatial project, using the narrative sequence and typographic layout to mimic the space effectively.

=== Daniel Libeskind ===
Daniel Libeskind designed the Jewish Museum Berlin and the World Trade Center site redesign. Before those projects, he was an academic for sixteen years and had designed only two constructed buildings. Libeskind advocates for buildings that are both beautiful and also communicate a historical and cultural context. His visionary architectural designs include floor plans of destroyed buildings and sketches of piles of sticks. Libeskind calls these efforts "exploring space".

=== Russian paper architects ===
In the 1980s, a group of Russian architects emerged from the Moscow Institute of Architecture, united by what architect Yuri Avvakumov dubbed paper architecture. The slang name "paper architecture" was meant to be negative, referring to design projects unfit for construction. These visionary architects included Yuri Avvakumov, Alexey Bavykin, Mikhail Belov, Alexander Brodsky, Mikhail Filippov, Mikhail Labazov, Ilya Utkin, Totan Kuzembaev, Vyacheslav Mizin, Yuri Kuzin and Dmitry Velichkin.

In the 1980s Soviet Union, architecture was standardized and limited by economics and the ideological controls of the state. Paper architecture offered freedom of expression and individualism. Some paper architects were inspired by Giovanni Battista Piranesi and the Russian avant-garde. They created visionary designs that they knew were never going to be constructed. Nevertheless, they were considered escapists, deserters, and dissidents.

In 1981, these architects worked with new leadership at the Union of Architects, receiving permission to participate in international competitions for the first time. When the paper architects won fifty competitions between 1981 and 1989, their visionary architecture began to be applauded within the Soviet Union. In 1992, the Moscow Institute of Architecture hosted the exhibit “Paper Architecture. Alma Mater”. After the exhibition, SBS Bank purchased the architectural drawings; ten years later, the drawings were added to the collection of a Russian museum. One work by the paper architects is Avvakumov's Tower of Perestroika, an ironic reminiscence of Tatlin's Monument to the Third International. Avvakumov created this design for a 1990 exhibit at the Russian Museum called “Temporary Monuments”.

In the early 1990s, the Soviet Union fired forty percent of its architects. Many of these architects established private practices and used their creativity for actual buildings.

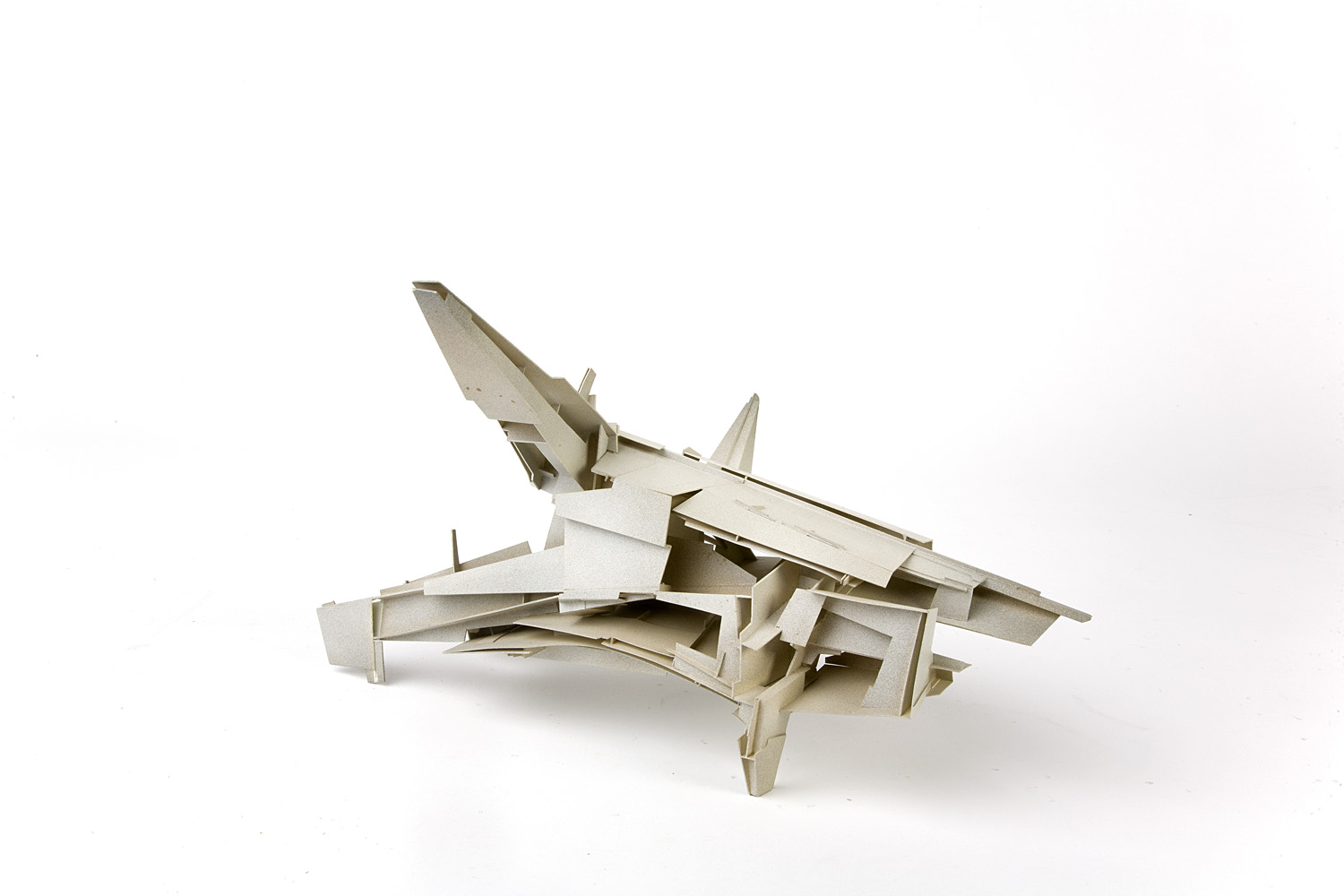
Starhouse One by Lebbeus Woods, 1996

Saint Benedict Chapel in Switzerland by Peter Zumthor

=== Lebbeus Woods ===
After working with the Finnish-American architect Eero Saarinen in the 1960s, the American architect Lebbeus Woods turned to visionary architecture around 1976. He produced a body of drawings and models that reimagine cities like Berlin, Paris, Havana, Sarajevo, and Vienna. Until his death in 2012, he was a professor at Cooper Union and other institutions, growing a "cult" of followers. He also maintained a blog for his ideas and reflections. He said, "Architecture should be judged not only by the problems it solves, but by the problems it creates."

The Guardian noted that Woods created, "Dynamic compositions of splintered surfaces and twisted wiry forms, his fantastical scenes depicted alternative worlds, glimpses into a parallel universe writhing beneath the earth's crust." One of his visionary designs was for Albert Einstein's tomb which would "travel on a beam of light around the Earth." Only one of his designs resulted in a physical building—the Light Pavilion within Steven Holl's vast complex of towers in Chengdu, China. Completed in 2012, the Light Pavilion includes huge beams of light entered by walking on glass suspended by steel rods.

=== Peter Zumthor ===
Swiss architect Peter Zumthor is a significant figure who works in visionary architecture. In his 1998 architectural manifesto Thinking Architecture, Zumthor discussed the significance of emotion and experience in determining successful architecture. He believes that a building's beauty is not in its shape, but in the sensations and emotions, it creates. His work was mostly unpublished because of his philosophical belief that architecture should be experienced firsthand.

== Related architectural forms ==
Visionary architecture overlaps with fantastic architecture, utopian architecture, and conceptual architecture. Fantastic architectural designs are built, whereas visionary designs are not intended to be built. Visionary architecture is more individualistic in its creation than utopian architecture. Conceptual architecture, or architecture based on imagination and visions, dissociates the physical nature of the architectural design. However, visionary architecture gains its significance in the belief that unbuilt drawings and images portray the true meaning of architecture and design.

== See also ==
- Conceptual architecture
- Deconstructivism
- Fantastic architecture
- Futurist architecture
- Utopian architecture
