= Ron Herron =

English architect (1930–1994)

- Born: 12 August 1930; London, England
- Died: 1 October 1994 (aged 64)
- Education: Regent Street Polytechnic, London
- Occupation: Architect
- Practice: Herron Associates
- Design: Walking City (1965)

Ronald James Herron (12 August 1930 – 1 October 1994) was an English architect and teacher. He is perhaps best known for his work with the seminal experimental architecture collective Archigram, which was formed in London in the early 1960s. Herron was the creator of one of the group's best known and celebrated projects, the Walking City.

== Early life and education ==
Ron Herron was born in London on 12 August 1930, to a leather-working family. He studied draughtsmanship at the Brixton School of Building and architecture at the Regent Street Polytechnic in London.

== Academic career ==
Herron taught at the Architectural Association in London from 1965 until 1993, when he was appointed as professor and Head of the School of Architecture at the University of East London.

== Professional career ==
Herron formed Herron Associates with his sons Andrew and Simon in 1981. The firm built the acclaimed Imagination Headquarters in London and were involved in the design for Canada Water station.

== Archigram ==
Shortly after finishing his architectural studies, Herron went to work for London County Council, alongside Warren Chalk and Dennis Crompton.

Architects Peter Cook, Mike Webb, and David Greene had been meeting regularly as a group at a greasy spoon in Swiss Cottage, and had already self-published a pamphlet called "Archigram" (from "architecture" + "telegram"). After they published the second issue they sought out Herron, Chalk and Crompton, who they knew by reputation. These six formed the core of Archigram. In 1963 the group was invited by Theo Crosby to exhibit on "The Living City" at the Institute of Contemporary Arts, which became a manifesto of sorts.

== Walking City ==
Herron is remembered for his "Walking City", later described as "the international icon of radical architecture of the Sixties". Between 1964 and 1966, the concepts for the Walking City were published in Archigram, consisting of multi-story buildings mounted on giant telescopic steel legs, creating an ovoid and insect-like form. While highly detailed, the drawings show little about how the ideas are meant to work in practice. These cities are considered to represent technological utopianism. Resembling the Maunsell Forts, they appeared warlike to some, leading Herron to be heckled at a conference in Folkestone in 1966 when he spoke about the Walking City. However, they were intended to be more like "survival pods" than weapons.

== Personal life ==
Herron married Pat Ginn in 1954 and they were together until he died. They had two sons.

Herron died at Woodford Green, Essex on 1 October 1994.
