= Frank Cordell =

English musician (1918–1980)

- Also known as: Frank Meilleur (pen name)
- Born: 1 June 1918; Kingston-upon-Thames, England, United Kingdom
- Died: 6 July 1980 (aged 62) Hastings, East Sussex, England, UK
- Occupations: Composer, arranger, conductor
- Formerly of: Institute of Contemporary Arts

Frank Cordell (1 June 1918 – 6 July 1980) was a British composer, arranger and conductor, who was active with the Institute of Contemporary Arts. He also composed music under the name Frank Meilleur or Meillear (Meillear being his mother's maiden name).

== Early life ==
He was born Frank Cordell in Kingston-upon-Thames. His father was a doctor who served with the Royal Army Medical Corps in the First World War. Frank had two sisters. His brother, Sid Cordell, who was a professional musician, composed music for some of the Hammer Horror films based at Pinewood Studios. As a young teenager Frank worked briefly for Homfray & Company in the cotton mills in Halifax and the Midlands for a family relative, before returning to London. By age 14, he was a competent pianist. Cordell entered a citywide London music contest and won a Melody Maker poll at the age of 17 for the most promising jazz pianist of 1935. This enabled him to secure a job as a sound man in one of the prestigious London Warner Bros. film studios.

== Military service ==
When World War II broke out Cordell enlisted in the Royal Air Force (RAF) and trained as a radio navigation operator, flying the Vickers Wellington in RAF Bomber Command. In his time between dangerous flying "ops", Cordell was in constant demand entertaining his squadron with popular piano music in the mess. On completing his 33 ops he was transferred to flying stealth De Havilland Mosquito bombers on the run between Britain and the Middle East. While in RAF Middle East he was later assigned as bandleader with his own group of musicians and a small convoy of lorries to entertain the British troops in the Western Desert Campaign. He was then appointed music director of the Forces Broadcasting Service in Cairo, where he conducted a weekly radio program called Music For Moderns. Among the friends and local Cairo artists he worked with was the singer, Delores El Greco. From there he was assigned to a double role of music entertainment and intelligence work in Palestine. It is in Palestine while music entertaining that he met his first wife Magda, who was a Hungarian refugee working for the British in translating intercepted wireless signals. Magda later became a "Brutalist" artist, and along with Cordell was a participant in the This Is Tomorrow Exhibit, and both were founder members of the Independent Group at the Institute of Contemporary Arts in London.

== BBC work ==
Cordell returned to Britain in 1947, resided on Higher Drive in Banstead, and joined the BBC as a composer, arranger, and orchestra conductor. Among the recording studios he used were the Abbey Road Studios in St John's Wood, and the Aeolian sound studio in Bond Street, he also worked with George Martin. Some of his early music hits were "Sadie's Shawl" (1956, UK #29) and "The Black Bear" (1961, UK #44), conducted by his own orchestra, as well as "Wheels Cha Cha", performed by Joe Loss (1961, UK #21) and his eponymous orchestra. Cordell was commended in 1951 for his radio score of the historical drama The Gay Galliard, starring Valerie Hobson as Mary, Queen of Scots. He worked with most of the performers and musicians of the day including Noël Coward, Charlie Chaplin, vocalists such as Alma Cogan and Ronnie Hilton, and the jazz trumpet player Humphrey Lyttelton. In 1952, Cordell was drawn to the cinema and made his music film debut. He also commenced composing music for many advertising commercials for film and TV.

== The Atelier ==
It was in this 1952/3 period that Frank and Magda Cordell established an artistic atelier at 52 Cleveland Square in Paddington London, which they shared and artistically collaborated with the British Modern artist John McHale. The McHale/Cordell atelier occupied three floors in a large Georgian row house in Cleveland Square. Frank used the top floor with his piano and large windows overlooking the park as his music composing studio. John McHale occupied the large sky-lit studio at the back of the atelier on the ground floor. Magda used the other large painting studio downstairs, which was also used by all three artist as a film studio. McHale used the downstairs film studio to produce his photograms for his Telemath collage series. There was also a separate downstairs workshop and photographic dark room. The living room on the ground floor was used for entertaining guests such as: Reyner Banham and other members of the ICA group, musicians, writers such as Eric Newby, dramatists such as Arnold Wesker, and international guests such as Buckminster Fuller, and Picasso's son. Cordell made numerous tape recordings of Fuller.

== Musical scores ==
In 1955, Cordell left the BBC to become musical director of His Master's Voice, known subsequently as EMI, a post held until 1962 when he decided to become a full-time film composer, and scored the music for the film The Captain's Table (1959).

In the early 1960s, Cordell divorced Magda, who went with McHale to America. Cordell married his second wife, Anja, whom he met on film location in Japan while doing the music score for the film Flight from Ashiya (1964). He wrote the theme music for the spy adventure TV series starring Robert Lansing called The Man Who Never Was (1966–67), and wrote The White Mountain introductory music for the science fiction episode of Space: 1999 – "Mission of the Darians" in 1975. Frank Cordell composed over twenty music scores including The Voice of Merrill (1952), First on the Road (1959), The Rebel (1961) starring Tony Hancock, The Bargee (1964), Never Put It in Writing (1964), Khartoum (1966), Mosquito Squadron (1969), Ring of Bright Water (1969), Hell Boats (1970), Cromwell (1970), Trial by Combat (1976), and God Told Me To (US: Demon, 1976). Between his film scores Cordell wrote concert hall works including the Concerto for Cello, the Concerto for Horn, a wind quartet entitled Interplay; also pieces for saxophone quartet, Gestures and Patterns, and mood miniatures such as Production Drive.

He wrote choral music for the Choir of King's College, Cambridge; and an arrangement for strings of the English air "Oh Dear, What Can the Matter Be", available on Guild GED5104. He was nominated for the Academy Award and Golden Globe Award for his feature film score of Cromwell, 1970. Cordell was involved in several experimental and documentary films. These included a surrealist film made in Yugoslavia in 1957 with McHale and his three sons and Arnold Bittleman the Yale trained artist. Cordell also wrote the score for the documentary film Tiger Tiger (1977). He appeared in the Fathers of Pop interviewed by Reyner Banham in a 1970s TV documentary on the origins of British pop art.

Cordell also wrote two significant scores for brass band: Spirals (1977) and Movements (1981).

== Later years ==
Cordell retired with his wife and son to their sheep farm in the English countryside, where they kept open house to many of Britain's leading artists and musicians including The Beatles.

Cordell died in Hastings in 1980, and his original manuscripts now reside in the archives at the Trinity College of Music in London.
