= Tokyoids: The Robotic Face of Architecture =

2022 book by François Blanciak

- Author: François Blanciak
- Language: English
- Subject: Architecture, robotics, Tokyo
- Genre: Architectural theory
- Publisher: MIT Press
- Publication date: September 13, 2022
- Publication place: United States
- Media type: Print (paperback), e-book
- Pages: 216
- ISBN: 978-0-262-54423-8
- Preceded by: Siteless: 1001 Building Forms (2008)

Tokyoids: The Robotic Face of Architecture is a 2022 book by the architect François Blanciak. It pairs a photographic survey of about fifty ordinary Tokyo buildings with a series of essays. Blanciak reads their façades as faces and sorts them by the emotions they appear to express. The robotic face, he argues, emerged in architecture before robotics developed as a science. It is Blanciak's second book, after Siteless: 1001 Building Forms (2008).

== Synopsis ==
Text and image address the same ideas by different means. Blanciak, who photographed the buildings in Tokyo between 2009 and 2019, reads their façades as faces: windows become eyes, doors become mouths, and balconies, grilles, and vents register expressions. These readings yield a taxonomy organized not by program, size, material, age, or style but by the emotions the buildings appear to convey. He coins the term tokyoid for an ordinary, anonymous structure that embodies the city's robotic character, and argues that the robotic face emerged in architecture before robotics existed as a science. His method, which he compares to the art historian Giovanni Morelli's attention to small details, treats seemingly unintentional elements as revelatory of Tokyo’s true image.

"Diagram and Face," the opening chapter, traces the face through seminal diagrams of architectural theory rather than the photographs. Each era, the author proposes, ordered the face by its own principles of geometry. Blanciak moves from Villard de Honnecourt's tripartite faces and Vitruvian proportion through Francesco di Giorgio Martini, Albrecht Dürer, Charles Le Brun, and Claude Perrault to the dismembered features in Jean-Jacques Lequeu's drawings, the Bauhaus signet, and Le Corbusier's split drawing Soleil et Gorgone, then Gilles Deleuze and Félix Guattari's "faciality" and cognitive science. A portion of this chapter also analyzes Arata Isozaki’s robotic creation for Expo ’70. (Note: This part of "Diagram and Face" is quite similar to an article Blanciak has published in October (2022) (179): 78–94, titled "The Face of Another: Isozaki, Deme, and the Postmodern Turn".) Two claims recur. The geometric processing of the face envisioned by architects anticipated robotic form. Architecture and the painted portrait are branches of a single effort to reconstruct the human body.

Six chapters follow ("Awe," "Wrath," "Mirth," "Pain," "Angst," and "Hunger"), named for the moods their buildings express and readable in any order. They connect Tokyo's robotic look to the merging of architecture and engineering, to eighteenth-century French theories of caractère and the Japanese kyarakutā (character), to an aesthetic of dismemberment in the katakana script, and to the social consequences of automation, including the withdrawn hikikomori and the prospect of machines absorbing architects' own work. The photographs sometimes correspond to the surrounding text and sometimes stand apart. A short postface, written during the COVID-19 pandemic, links the masking and screen-mediated life to the book's account of the face's migration into buildings and electronic devices. Against his earlier Siteless: 1001 Building Forms, Blanciak describes a shift from invented forms to existing ones, and states that "this book is in fact two books in one."

== Critics ==
Matthew Allen called the book wide-ranging and faster-paced than most architectural history. He read it as two books in one, cultural criticism of Tokyo's vernacular and a faciality treatise. Though he questioned one claim, he found the book locates humanity "in moments of recognition," and compared it to Roland Barthes’ Mythologies.

Will Davis placed the book in the genre of the architect's essay, built on erudition rather than data. He saw it turn from celebrated Japanese modernism to overlooked, mass-produced buildings, where the author finds beauty and faces. He likened it to Venturi and suggested readers would head out "with a camera in hand."
