= Magda Cordell McHale =

Hungarian artist (1921–2008)

- Cordell McHale in the classroom at SUNY Buffalo
- Born: Magda Lustigova; 24 June 1921; Hungary
- Died: 21 February 2008 (aged 86); Sloan, New York
- Known for: Painting, futurist author
- Spouses: Frank Cordell, m.1946, divorced 1961.; John McHale, m. 1961- 1978, his death.

Magda Cordell McHale (née Lustigova; June 24, 1921 – February 21, 2008) was a Hungarian artist, futurist, and educator. She was a founding member of the Independent Group which was a British movement that originated Pop Art which grew out of a fascination with American mass culture and post-WWII technologies. Later, she was a faculty member in the University at Buffalo School of Architecture & Planning.

"I was filled with pain and I hoped for a better world," she recounted later. This expression of hope came to define her working practices for the rest of her life. "Society needs to know where it has been before it can know where it is going," was her oft-cited mantra.

== Early life ==
Born Magda Lustigova to a prominent family of grain merchants in Hungary, she fled to Egypt and then Palestine as a refugee during World War II to escape Nazi persecution. Here, she found work as a translator for British intelligence and met her first husband, Frank Cordell, who was also working for British intelligence. According to British architect Peter Smithson, Magda Cordell was "a force who had the capacity to turn her willpower to anything."

== Post war ==
After the war, Lustigova and Cordell returned to London, where they established an artistic atelier at 52 Cleveland Square in Paddington, which they shared with the British Modern artist John McHale. She and her husband rapidly became an integral part of the avant-garde artistic milieu that congregated around the Institute of Contemporary Arts. They were actively involved in the Independent Group (IG) (1952–56), a cross-cultural discussion group that included artists, writers, architects and critics who rejected the traditional dichotomies of high and low culture. The IG challenged the official Modernist assumptions of British aesthetics and pioneered a progressive, interdisciplinary, consumer-based aesthetic of inclusiveness. The three artists collaborated on a variety of projects, and Magda Cordell soon became indispensable to the activities of the IG for her writings as well as her archiving and organisation. She was closely involved with the exhibition This is Tomorrow at the Whitechapel Gallery in 1956, a multi-disciplinary show retrospectively credited with launching British Pop art.

The McHale/Cordell atelier occupied three floors in a large Georgian row house in Cleveland Square. Frank used the top floor with his piano and large windows overlooking the park as his music composing studio. John McHale occupied the large sky lit studio at the back of the atelier on the ground floor. Magda Cordell used the other large painting studio downstairs, which was also used by all three artist as a film studio. McHale used the downstairs film studio to produce his photograms for his Telemath collage series. There was also a separate downstairs workshop and photographic dark room. The living room on the ground floor was used for entertaining guests such as: Reyner Banham and other members of the ICA group, musicians, writers such as Eric Newby, dramatists such as Arnold Wesker, and international guests such as Buckminster Fuller, and Picasso's son, Paulo. Cordell made numerous tape recordings of Fuller.

Magda Cordell later recalled the significance of McHale’s return from his formative visit to America laden with imagery culled from American sources. “We all sat around on the floor for hours and looked through this unbelievable trunk of materials,” she said.

In 1961, Magda Cordell divorced Frank Cordell and left for America with McHale, where they immersed themselves in academia. Encouraged by their dialogue with the American intellectual Buckminster Fuller, the McHales dedicated themselves to sociological research and published extensively on the impact of technology and culture, mass communications and the future. They moved from university to university propounding their ideas, teaching and publishing. During this time Magda published five books (three in collaboration with her husband) on future trends, and sat on numerous editorial boards.

== Art ==
McHale's artistic works were characterised by expressive figuration and heavily influenced by the Art Brut of continental painters such as Jean Dubuffet and Wols. As a rare female voice at this time, McHale's preoccupation with the female form explored existential questions. Her textured, impasto surfaces depict distorted forms that at once reflect the resilience of the human body and describe mid-20th-century anguish. McHale's work was acknowledged in articles and exhibitions of the day; the influential critic Reyner Banham included an illustration of her work in his 1955 article "The New Brutalism", in The Architectural Review. McHale showcased her monotypes and collages in a 1955 exhibition at the Institute of Contemporary Arts (ICA) and her paintings at the Hanover Gallery in 1956, with later exhibitions at the University at Buffalo.

Contemporary critics dwelt on the works' sensuous, aggressive and primitivist qualities. "Her representation of women is not concerned with traditional notions of beauty or traditional cultural values . . . The result may be monstrous and uncompromising, but in this age of corsets, cosmetics, automation and celluloid sex, it might do us no harm to be shocked back into the realisation that there is still latent in the human being a savage instinct, fecundity and energy." Despite this new vista of art, she remained in her own work unswayed by the freedoms and allure of popular imagery and maintained her commitment to figuration. She later explained: "I am a European painter and for me that figure, that shape, is still superior to all that."

McHale's work is included in the collections of the Tate Modern in London, and the Albright-Knox Art Gallery in Buffalo, New York.

== Academic work and teaching ==
John and Magda moved from the UK to Southern Illinois University where John managed the World Resources Inventory with Buckminster Fuller, then to SUNY Binghamton where John completed his PhD and, with Magda, started the Center for Integrative Studies. Later, they moved to Texas, where the center was operated under the aegis of University of Houston.

After the death of John McHale in 1978, Magda Cordell McHale was invited to Buffalo, New York, where she established and became director of the Centre for Integrative Studies at the State University of New York. The main focus of the centre was global trends, inter-generational shifts in thought and the impact of new technologies on contemporary culture.

Magda Cordell McHale was on faculty in the Design Studies department in the School of Architecture & Planning at the University at Buffalo (also referred to as SUNY Buffalo). The department was dissolved in the late 1980s, at which point, she moved to the Department of Planning (later the Department of Urban and Regional Planning). Her areas of scholarship included future studies; long-range consequences of social, cultural, and technological change on global societies.

In 2000 she endowed the McHale Fellowship at the University of Buffalo School of Architecture & Planning to support design work that speculates on the impact of new technologies.

She was active in the World Academy of Art & Science and the World Futures Society. She worked "tirelessly" as vice-president of the World Futures Federation and the World Academy of Art and Science.
