= Alexander Brodsky =

Russian architect and sculptor

Alexander Savvich Brodsky
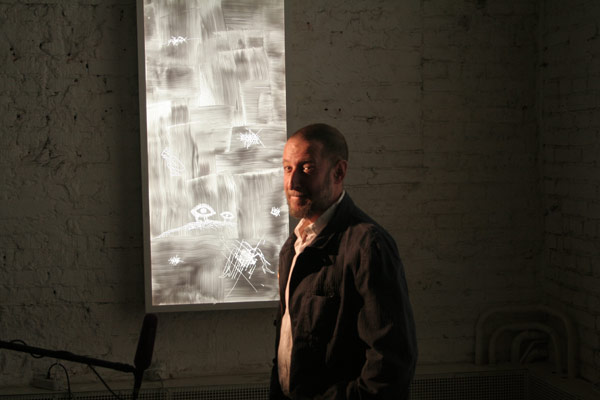
- Born: 1955 (age 70–71); Moscow, Russia
- Occupation: Architect

Alexander Savvich Brodsky (born 1955) is a Russian architect and sculptor. He is known for his works of paper architecture.

== Early work ==
Alexander Brodsky graduated Moscow Architecture Institute in 1978. He first gained recognition in the late 1970s. He was a key member of the paper architects (visionary architecture), and furthermore, worked alongside Ilya Utkin in his etchings of distorted cityscapes. Paper architecture was a response to state sanctioned architecture that consisted of standardised and often poorly constructed buildings, which imbued their environments with a communist aesthetic. Such a response allowed paper architects to retreat into their imaginations and defy uniform Soviet architecture through vivid depictions of constructivism, deconstructivism and postmodernism. According to Anna Sokolina, paper architects rose to prominence within the Western world as many of their works won prestigious awards in professional competitions and helped to shape an understanding of Russian modern and postmodern architecture. Scholarship has shown that the whimsical and constructivist etchings of Brodsky and Utkin translate mere illustrations into narratives through the introduction of human characters. These were narratives that voiced man's alienation within the urban world and provided a commentary on the loss of Moscows historical architectural heritage.

== Installations ==
Brodsky won his first architectural award in 1989 and was invited to New York by East Meets West, a not for profit organization established by Anneke van Waesberghe. His second trip to New York was in 1990 at the invitation of gallerist Ronald Feldman and then moved there in 1996 to complete public projects as well as personal installations. In 1996 the Public Art Fund asked Brodsky to transform an unused set of tracks in the Canal Street subway station. Brodsky transformed the station for two months into a Venetian lagoon using a 5000-gallon tank, which held life-size gondolas and cut out passengers. In 1999 Brodsky created Palazzo Nudo in Pittsburgh, a 16-metre-high (52 ft) house shaped skeleton with the crumbled ruins of the metropolis heaped in the centre. Coma, 2000, displayed at the Guelman Gallery in Moscow showed the city "as if it was in a hospital or on a surgeon's table" and his work produced for 2006 Venice Architecture Biennale was an ominous and foreboding comment on the doomed fate of Venice sinking into the sea. Night Before the Attack, 2009, discusses the associations of emotion with structure and scale. Brodsky used the title to enlighten the viewer's understanding of a story that lay beneath the artwork. Such a narrative has imbued new meaning and significance to the old structures that have been appropriated within the installation.

== Architecture ==
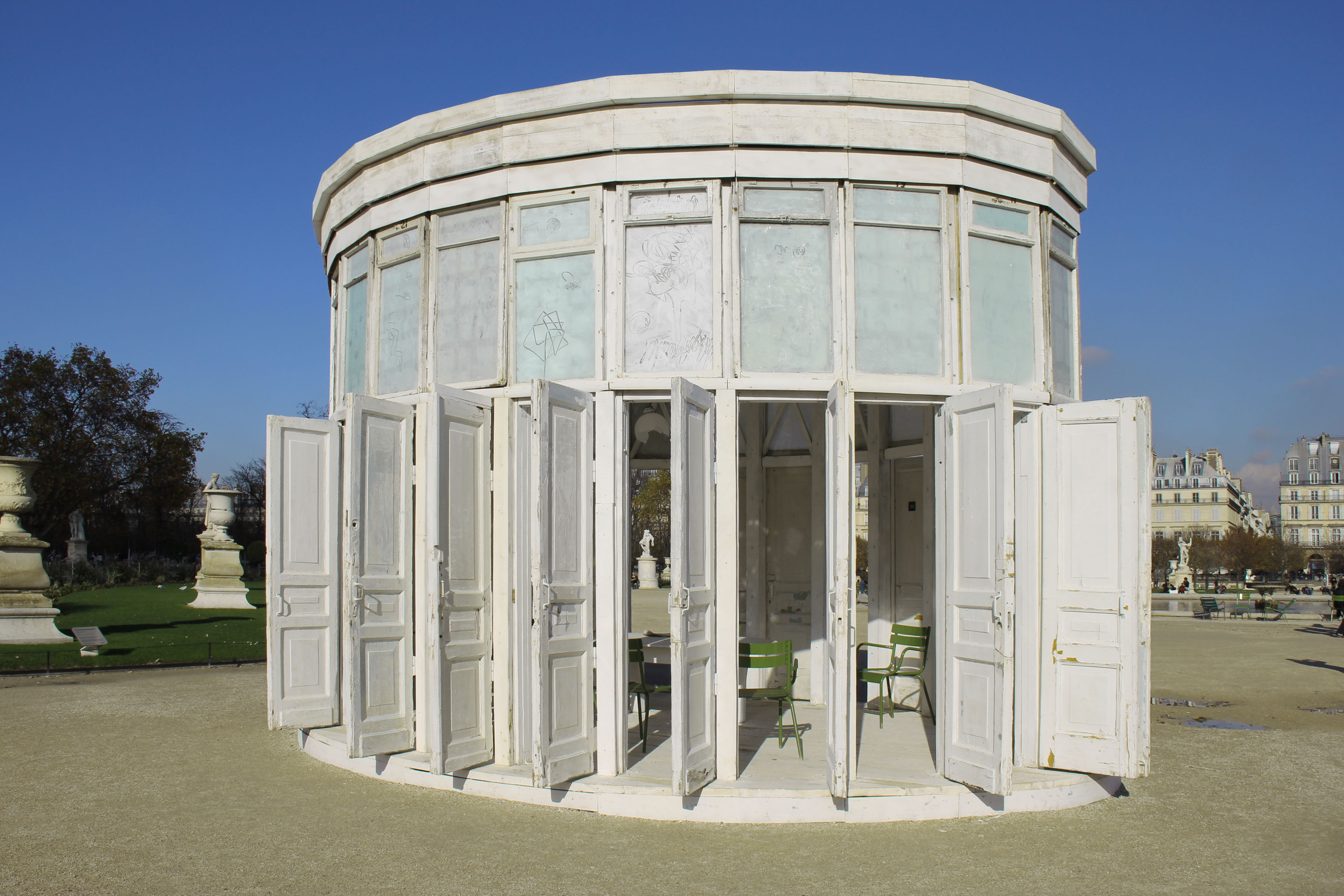
Alexander Brodsky, exposition in Jardin des Tuileries, Paris (2010)

Brodsky has really only been an architect since 2000, with his first commission in 2002. He claimed that his return from artistry to architecture was difficult. Despite the commission that Brodsky received upon each work, his efforts were burdened with a mental and physical toll – "I was near a serious mental problem. I'd never had this responsibility, and I was alone. It was my first experience communicating with workers and clients." His first commission, 95 Degrees, a restaurant near Moscow on the Klyazma Reservoir shows Brodsky's specific and often wary architectural style. Everything is precisely thought out, from the materials of wood and plastic, to the subtle deformation of the wooden stilts (all are tilted at a 95-degree angle). Also built in 2002 is Apshu, a restaurant – club hidden in the basement of a building Moscow, now defunct and demolished. The space was specifically framed through recycled window frames and created a sense of nostalgia that isn't usually found in postmodern work. One of Brodsky's most famous works was the Vodka Ceremony Pavilion built in 2004 for a contemporary art festival at the Klyazma Reservoir, demolished in 2012. Again, recycled timber window frames are rescued from industrial buildings and reused. Painted white and forming the structure of the pavilion, the window frames create a sense of Russian tradition from the industrial heritage that defined 20th century Moscow. His projects often have a cerebral and ephemeral quality, despite often being permanent. A literally ephemeral project, Brodsky produced a pavilion on the Klyazma Reservoir in 2003 from water sprayed over a metal mesh attached to a wooden structure. The pavilion was lit from the interior, causing the building to glow. When spring came, the ice melted and the structure was removed.

A small but international respected project was done in Austria, where Brodsky was invited to design one out of seven small bus stops in Krumbach.

Brodskys projects are often built from nothing. His use of recycled materials, window frames, glass and plastic bags to create new structures creates a unique aesthetic. His architectural style combines local and reused materials in such a way that creates buildings that feel both traditional and modern but remain inventive and original.

== Criticism ==
Brodsky has been revered in Soviet architectural culture since the late 1970s when he first entered the public sphere as a member of the paper architects. Fellow Russians adore him and have called him the "most important Russian architect alive today". His reputation as a paper architect has expanded beyond Russia. He maintains a global presence, achieved in collaboration with Ilya Utkin, as well as his built projects that display Brodsky's specific style, referred to as "New Russian Architecture" by architects in his own studio. According to Mark Lamster, Constantin Boym declared, "When it comes to Brodsky, there is a reverence – like he is our genius."

The paper architects of the late 1970s and 1980s gained critical and commercial success outside of Russia through professional competitions and exhibitions. Interest in Soviet paper architecture was high from the late 1980s until the early 2000s with many exhibitions across America, as well as in Western Europe. This interest in Brodskys work allowed him to travel to America and to begin exhibiting his installations.

Brodsky's installations were well received (he was invited to participate in the 2006 Venice Biennale) but did not, however, translate into commercial success. In light of this fact, Brodsky returned to his original profession – architecture. His buildings have been applauded for their tendency to incorporate traditional elements of Soviet architecture, such as form, material and techniques, into modern and unique structures. They have also helped to define Russian architecture within the 21st Century, and more importantly, to determine the future direction of architectural culture.

Many viewers however criticise the lack of radicalism within his built works. Whilst his earlier etchings and installations are an obvious reaction against the dehumanising nature of Soviet approved architecture and the lack of care for traditions, the anxiety and chaos of these works are not apparent in his built projects. Brodsky says in reaction to this "I want to design spaces that make people feel good."

== Books ==
- Brodsky & Utkin , Princeton Architectural Press, 2015. (ISBN 978-1616893163)
