= John McHale (artist) =

British artist (1922 – 1978)

John McHale FRSA (August 19, 1922 – November 2, 1978) was a Scottish artist, art theorist, sociologist and future studies searcher. He was a member of the Independent Group, a British movement (Institute of Contemporary Arts, London) that originated pop art which grew out of an interest in American mass culture and post–World War II technologies.

He was born in Maryhill, Glasgow, Scotland. He was educated in the United Kingdom and the United States, with a PhD in sociology. After spending a year at Yale University in 1955–1956, he moved definitively to the US in 1962 to work with the architect Buckminster Fuller on ecological issues and environmental sustainability. He and his wife, the artist Magda Cordell, then founded their own future studies organization, the Center for Integrative Studies (CIS), to deal with the long-term consequences of scientific and technological developments on mankind future and the environment.

== Pop art ==
According to McHale's son, the term Pop Art was first coined by his father in 1954 in conversation with Frank Cordell, although other sources credit its origin to the British critic Lawrence Alloway. Both versions agree that the term was in use in Independent Group discussions by mid-1950s.

The critic Reyner Banham called John McHale the "scholar-artist, this 'Father of Pop'". Alloway in his Artforum article on "Pop art Since 1949" notes that "with reference to pop art that could be demonstrated ... John McHale made collages in 1955 out of the then-fresh postwar color printed American magazines." McHale's works included fine arts, graphics, exhibition design, television, film and general consultancy to organisations in the US and Europe. He exhibited widely in Europe from 1950. He started as a Constructivist artist and then transitioned into his Pop art and proto Op art. With fellow members of the Independent Group, Richard Hamilton, Reyner Banham and Lawrence Alloway he organised the Growth and Form exhibition in 1951, inspired by the work of the scientist D'Arcy Wentworth Thompson. Although it received no financial support from the government or the Festival Office it had an agenda which was close to the official exhibitions of the Festival of Britain. McHale with Alloway curated a Collages and Objects exhibit at the ICA in 1954, where McHale first exhibited his formative Pop Art collages including the Transistor series, and his interactive gaming collage book Why I Took To The Washers In Luxury Flats.

John McHale was awarded a scholarship to study with Josef Albers at the Design Department of Yale University in August 1955, and returned to London in June 1956. He then participated in the 1956 exhibition This Is Tomorrow at the Whitechapel Art Gallery, where he supplied a good deal of the Pop Art visual material (projectors, gramophone motors, film posters and probably the juke box were supplied by Frank Cordell). Jeremy Hunt states in his article on 'This Is Tomorrow' that the exhibition Pop Art poster Just What Is It that Makes Today's Homes So Different, So Appealing? is attributed to "Richard Hamilton based on a design by McHale." According to Magda Cordell, "the material in that collage came from John McHale's files."

== Published work ==
McHale was a member of the Southern Illinois University Design Faculty. In the 1960s he was an Associate with Buckminster Fuller in the World Resources Inventory and in the World Design Science Decade Centre at Southern Illinois University Carbondale where he co-authored a number of the reports.

McHale published extensively in Europe and the US on the impact of technology and culture, mass communications and the future. His numerous articles include:

- "Gropius and the Bauhaus" in Art (1955)
- "Josef Albers" and "Buckminster Fuller" in Architectural Review (1956)
- "The Expendable Ikon #1, #2" in Architectural Design (1959)
- "The Fine Arts and Mass Media" in Cambridge Opinion (1959)
- "The Plastic Parthenon" in Macatre (1966)
- "2000+" in Architectural Design (1967)
- "The Future and Function of Art" in ART News (1973)
- "Telefutures: Prospective Observations" in The New Television: A Public/Private Art, MoMA (1977)
- "The Future of Art and Mass Culture" in Leonardo (1979)

His books include:

- The Future of the Future (Braziller, 1968)
- The Ecological Context (Braziller, 1970)
- World Facts and Trends (Collier-MacMillan, 1972)
- The Changing Information Environment (Westview Press, 1976)
- The Futures Directory (with Magda Cordell McHale, Westview Press, 1977)
- Basic Human Needs: A Framework for Action: A Report to the U.N. Environment Programme, April 1977 (with Magda Cordell McHale, Transaction Books, 1978)

== Honours ==
McHale was a Fellow (and Secretary-General) of the World Academy of Art and Science, the Royal Society of Arts, the New York Academy of Sciences, and the American Geographical Society. He was awarded the Medaille d'Honneur en Vermeil, Society d' Encouragement au Progrès in 1966 and the Knight Commander's Cross of the Order of St. Denis in 1974. McHale was a member of the American Sociological Association, Institute of Ecology, Society for the Advancement of General Systems Theory, a member of the Colorado Archaeological Society, a member of the World Futures Studies Federation, and a founding member of the Futures Advisory Board.
