= Warren Chalk =

English architect (1927–1988)

- Born: 1927; England
- Died: 1988
- Occupation: Architect

Warren Chalk (1927–1988) was an English architect. He was a member of Archigram. Amongst the group he was known as "the catalyst of ideas".

== Early life and education ==
Chalk, (John) Warren (1927–1987), architect, was born on 7 July 1927 at 32 Killarney Road, Wandsworth, London, the second of three sons of James Percival Chalk (1887–1962), Unitarian minister, and his wife, Gretchen Elisabeth Stovold, née Brigden (1891–1972). He studied painting, then architecture at Manchester School of Art, now part of Manchester Metropolitan University.

=== Professional life ===
Chalk worked at London County Council where he designed with his east London friend and close colleague, Ron Herron. They made a reputation designing the London Southbank Centre, the Queen Elizabeth Hall, Purcell Room, Hayward Gallery, and the famous 'undercroft', now so popular with skate boarders. He taught at the Architectural Association School of Architecture (AA) in Bedford Square, London, and regularly attended lectures from his peers. He was friends with Reyner Banham, James Stirling, James Gowan, Alison and Peter Smithson and Cedric Price who also attended AA events. His major contribution was the Archigram magazines, especially Issue 4 with the famous Zoom cover. Chalk and Herron won various competitions before their involvement with Archigram, notably 'Gasket Homes' was an early success. He was known as the most critical and abrasive of the Archigram group, questioning the banal, and his interests were broad and eclectic. He was always divided between architecture and painting.

== Past appointments ==
- Architectural Association School of Architecture, London Unit Master
- Fellow of the British Interplanetary Society
- Member of the Chartered Society of Designers
- Member of the Interfaculty Computer Graphics Research at UCLA
- Consultant at the Jet Propulsion Laboratory at NASA
