= Independent Group (art movement) =

1950s English art movement

The Independent Group (IG) met at the Institute of Contemporary Arts (ICA) in London, England, from 1952 to 1955. The IG consisted of painters, sculptors, architects, writers and critics who wanted to challenge prevailing modernist approaches to culture. They introduced mass culture into debates about high culture, re-evaluated modernism and created the "as found" or "found object" aesthetic. The subject of renewed interest in a post-disciplinary age, the IG was the topic of a two-day, international conference at Tate Britain in March 2007. The Independent Group is regarded as the precursor to the Pop Art movement in Britain.

== First session (1952) ==
The Independent Group had its first meeting in April 1952, which consisted of artist and sculptor Eduardo Paolozzi feeding a mass of colourful images from American magazines through an epidiascope. These images, composed of advertising, comic strips and assorted graphics, were collected when Paolozzi was resident in Paris from 1947-1949. Much of the material was assembled as scrapbook collages and formed the basis of his BUNK! series of screenprints (1972) and the Krazy Kat Archives now held at the V & A Museum, London. In fact, Paolozzi's seminal 1947 collage I was a Rich Man's Plaything was the first such "found object" material to contain the word ″pop″ and is considered the initial standard bearer of “Pop Art”. The rest of the first Independent Group session concentrated on philosophy and technology during September 1952 to June 1953, and was chaired by design critic and historian, Reyner Banham. Key members at this stage included Paolozzi, the artist Richard Hamilton, surrealist and magazine art director Toni del Renzio, sculptor William Turnbull, the photographer Nigel Henderson and fine artist John McHale, along with the art critic Lawrence Alloway.

== Second session (1954) ==
The Group did not meet during late 1953 or early 1954, as they were concentrating on delivering a public programme of lectures at the ICA, Aesthetic Problems of Contemporary Art. New members joined the Independent Group for its second full session, including the architects Alison and Peter Smithson. The Smithsons along with Paolozzi, Henderson, Ronald Jenkins, Toni del Renzio, Banham and others staged the highly significant exhibition, Parallel of Life and Art at the ICA in the autumn of 1953. Reyner Banham stood down as chair of the Independent Group, as he was busy with his PhD thesis at the Courtauld Institute of Art, and in late 1954 Dorothy Morland asked the art critic Lawrence Alloway and fine artist John McHale to reconvene the Independent Group for its second session. The painter Magda Cordell and her husband, music producer Frank Cordell joined the Independent Group at this point.

The second session focused on American mass culture such as Western movies, science fiction, billboards, car design and popular music. In the course of such discussions, they drew upon Futurist, Surrealist, the Bauhaus, and Dada concepts. John McHale and Lawrence Alloway curated a Collages and Objects exhibition at the ICA in 1954, where McHale exhibited his formative Pop Art collages. Richard Hamilton organised an exhibition, Man, Machine and Motion in late 1955 at the Hatton Gallery, Newcastle and the ICA, which focussed on some Independent Group concerns.

== This Is Tomorrow (1956) ==
In 1956 the group came to wider public attention with its participation in the exhibition This Is Tomorrow. The IG ceased to meet formally by 1955, but the IG members continued to meet informally right up to 1962/63, and the connections between the various members continued to bear fruit in the subsequent years of their creative practice.

== Bibliography ==
- Anne Massey, The Independent Group: Modernism and Mass Culture in Britain, 1945–59, Manchester University Press, 1995.
- David Robbins (Ed) The Independent Group: Postwar Britain and The Aesthetics of Plenty, MIT Press, 1990.
