= Jean-Jacques Lequeu =

French draughtsman and architect

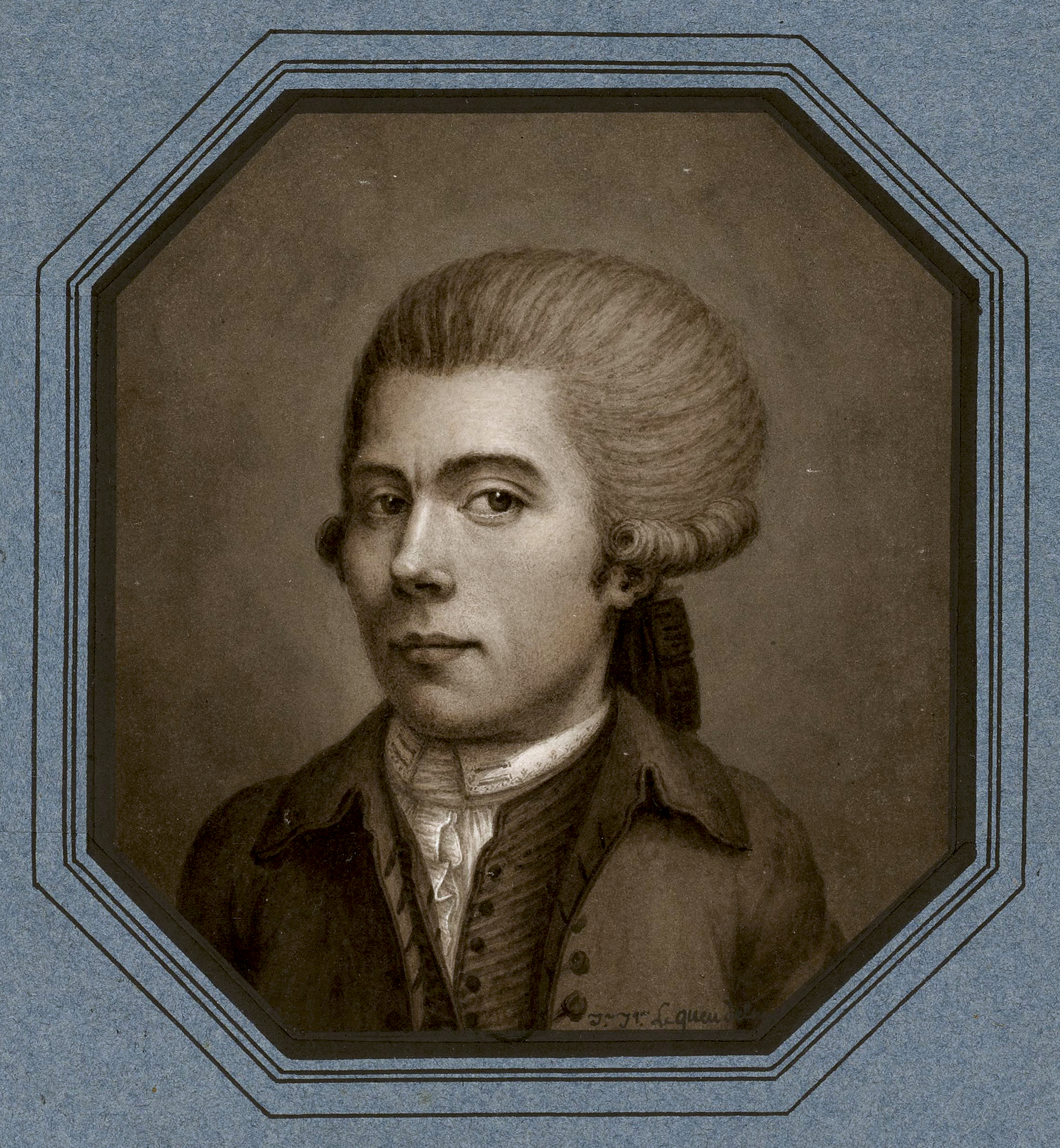
Self portrait (late 18th century)

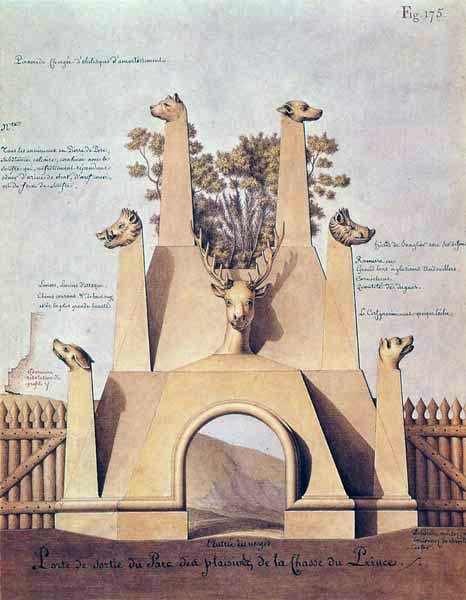
Gate of a hunting-ground, a project by Lequeu

Jean-Jacques Lequeu (French pronunciation: [ʒɑ̃ ʒak ləkø]; September 14, 1757 – March 28, 1826) was a French draughtsman and architect.

== Life ==
Lequeu was born in Rouen, and won a scholarship to go to Paris. Following the French Revolution, his architectural career never took off. He spent time preparing the Architecture Civile, a book intended for publication, but which was never published. He became a civil servant working as a surveyor and a cartographer until his retirement in 1815. Lequeu died in Paris in 1826.

== Legacy and rediscovery ==
Lequeu is now considered part of the period of "visionary architecture" which developed in the period leading up to the French Revolution. This was directly influenced by the great competitions organised by the École des Beaux-Arts. These competitions encouraged entries comprising massive buildings unfettered by budgetary constraints. This resulted in scores of designs for vast and impressive buildings which had little connection with the real world and remained "paper architecture". Architects of this genre include Claude-Nicolas Ledoux, Étienne-Louis Boullée, and Antoine Vaudoyer; most of these, like Lequeu, are more famous for their unbuilt works than for buildings actually constructed.

Most of his drawings can be found at the Bibliothèque nationale de France. Some of them are pornographic and are kept in the Enfer of the library. They include a cow barn in the shape of an Assyrian bovine; an erotic garden folly called the Hammock of Love, replete with a copulating couple; a priapic fountain in a Gothic tabernacle and two self-portraits in drag. Most of these drawings have been reproduced in Duboy's book in 1986. More recently, an exhibition took place at the Musee du Petit-Palais (Paris) in December 2018.

Lequeu's historiography has led to a deep reflection. It was only at the middle of the 20th century that he was rediscovered by the Viennese historian Emil Kaufmann. Kaufmann saw in Lequeu a "revolutionary architect" as well as Boullée and Ledoux, but this epithet must be used with caution: although some of his drawings express sympathy for Revolutionary ideas, his views seem to have evolved in line with social and political changes.

It was not until 1986, however, that the first monograph devoted to Lequeu was published, written by architect and architectural historian Philippe Duboÿ. This pioneering work takes the controversial view that Lequeu's work is partially the result of a deliberate manipulation involving Marcel Duchamp. As early as 1987, the theorist and historian of architecture Joseph Rykwert, in a review of Duboÿ's book, underlined the weakness of his scientific justification which mixed fact, fiction, fancy, incongruous comparisons and the most unverifiable conjectures. According to Elisa Boeri, “Assumptions that Duchamp contributed to the possible manipulation of Lequeu's legacy at the National Library now appear to be chimerical”. American art historian and art critic James Elkins considers that this is a deliberate hoax.

There is ambiguity surrounding the relations of Lequeu to Surrealism. A kind of retrospective illusion could lead us to see several of Lequeu's drawings through the prism of the paintings by De Chirico, Magritte or Delvaux. But if we refer to the writings of André Breton and his friends, and even to those of Marcel Duchamp, it is very difficult to find any trace of admiration for Lequeu, who is not mentioned either by the first historians of this artistic movement.

== See also ==
- Architecture parlante
- Claude Nicolas Ledoux

== Bibliography ==
- Jean-Jacques Lequeu, Bâtisseur de fantasmes, sous la direction de Laurent Baridon, de Jean-Philippe Garric et de Martial Guédron, catalogue d’exposition Petit Palais | Musée des Beaux-Arts de la Ville de Paris, du 11 décembre 2018 au 31 mars 2019. Paris : BNF Éditions, Éditions Norma, ISBN 2376660211, 2018 (192 p.).
- Laurent Baridon, Jean-Philippe Garric et Martial Guédron. Lexique Lequeu. Paris, Éditions B2, ISBN 978-2-36509-097-1, 2018 (222 p.).
- Elisa Boeri. Jean Jacques Lequeu. Un atlas des mémoires. Paris, Editions des Cendres, ISBN 978-2-86742-287-4, 2018 (240 p.).
- Philippe Duboy. Lequeu : An Architectural Enigma. MIT Press; ISBN 978-0-262-04086-0 (November 29, 1986)
- Emil Kaufmann. Three Revolutionary Architects: Boullée, Ledoux, and Lequeu. American Philosophical Society, 1952.
- Jean-Claude Lemagny. Visionary Architects: Boullée, Ledoux, Lequeu. Hennessey & Ingalls; ISBN 0-940512-35-1; (July 2002)
- Felice Romano, Nouvelle Méethode di Jean-Jacques Lequeu. Ridisegno, analisi grafica e rilettura critica. Milano, FrancoAngeli, ISBN 978-88-351-1782-7, 2021
