= Conceptual architecture =

Form of building architecture

Conceptual architecture is a form of architecture that utilizes conceptualism, characterized by an introduction of ideas or concepts from outside of architecture often as a means of expanding the discipline of architecture. This produces an essentially different kind of building than one produced by the widely held 'architect as a master-builder' model, in which craft and construction are the guiding principles. In conceptual architecture, the finished building as product is less important than the ideas guiding them, ideas represented primarily by texts, diagrams, or art installations. Architects that work in this vein are Diller + Scofidio, Bernard Tschumi, Peter Eisenman, and Rem Koolhaas.

Conceptual architecture was examined in the essay "Notes on Conceptual Architecture: Towards a Definition" by Peter Eisenman in 1970, and again by the Harvard Design Magazine in autumn 2003 and winter 2004, by a series of articles under the heading "Architecture as Conceptual Art? Blurring Disciplinary Boundaries". But the understanding of design as a construction of a concept was understood by many modernist architects as well. To quote Louis Kahn on Frank Lloyd Wright:

It doesn't work, it doesn't have to work. Wright had the shape conceived long before he knew what was going into it. I claim that is where architecture starts, with the concept.

== See also ==
- Conceptual art

== Bibliography ==
- Eisenman, Peter (2004). Eisenman Inside Out: Selected Writings, 1963-1988. Yale University Press. ISBN 0-300-09008-0
- Frampton, Kenneth (1992). Modern Architecture, a critical history. Thames & Hudson- Third Edition. ISBN 0-500-20257-5
- "Architecture As Conceptual Art?". Harvard Design Magazine. Number 19, Fall 2003/Winter 2004.
