= Michael Webb (architect) =

English architect (born 1937)

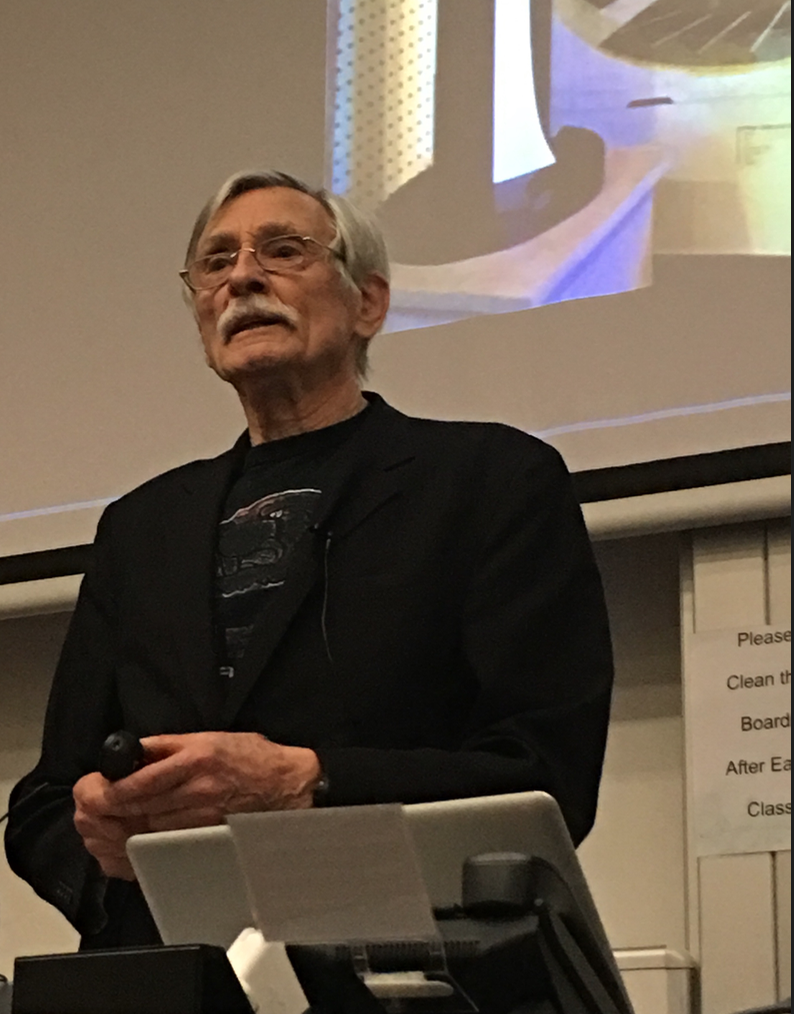
Michael Webb, Experimental Architect and Founding Member of Archigram, presents his life works, Two Journeys, at University of Edinburgh. On Gradually Getting It Right

(Photo by Nancy McCoy Webb)

Michael Webb (born 1937) is an English architect. He was a founding member of the 1960s Archigram Group.

== Biography ==
Webb was born in Henley-on-Thames and studied architecture at the Regent Street Polytechnic in London, taking seventeen years to complete a five-year curriculum.

He was a founding member of the 1960s Archigram Group, a collection of six young radical architects. They used a magazine format, Archigram inflatable structures, clothing-like environments, bright colors and cartoon-like drawing techniques.

Webb moved to the United States in 1965 to teach at Virginia Tech, and has since taught architecture at the Rhode Island School of Design, NJIT, Columbia University, Barnard College, Cooper Union, University at Buffalo, Pratt Institute and Princeton University.

Webb taught a summer semester in Barcelona, Spain to University at Buffalo Master of Architecture students along with Professor Bonnie Ott in the summer of 2001.

He has also put on exhibitions in Europe, Asia, and North America. His latest exhibition, Two Journeys, opened in the fall semester, giving Webb an opportunity for students to learn about him and his work. The exhibit was mounted and read like the pages of a book. It centered on two main themes: a train of thought deriving from the Reyner Banham article A Home is not a House (1965) and a study of linear perspective projection. His monograph Michael Webb: Two Journeys Lars Muller Publishers.

Some of Michael Webb's projects, including Sin Centre (1962), Rent-a-Wall (1966), Cushicle (1966), Suitaloon (1967), and Drive-In House (1968), were considered influential in the field of architecture.

Webb is retired and living in San Diego, California USA. He continues to present at Schools of Architecture around the world.
