= David Greene (architect) =

- Born: 1937; Nottingham, England
- Occupation: Architect

David Greene (born Nottingham 1937) is an English architect, lecturer and writer on architectural subjects. He was a member of Archigram.

== Early life and education ==
Greene was born in Nottingham and studied architecture at Art School. He started his career working on T-shirts designs for Paul Smith.

== Current appointments ==
- Visiting Professor of Architecture at Oxford Brookes University
- External Examiner on the Masters in Advanced Research at the Bartlett

== Awards ==
- RIBA Gold Medal 2002 (Archigram).
- Joint Annie Spinks Award with Sir Peter Cook (2002).
