= Dennis Crompton =

English architect (1935–2025)

- Born: 29 June 1935; Blackpool, Lancashire, England
- Died: 21 January 2025 (aged 89)
- Occupation: Architect

Dennis Crompton (29 June 1935 – 20 January 2025) was an English architect, lecturer and writer on architectural subjects. He was a member of Archigram. He was known as the back-room fixer dealing with technology and looking after the archives of the group.

== Life and career ==
Crompton was born in Blackpool on 29 June 1935, and studied architecture at Manchester University. The records he kept of Archigram led to the creation of the Archigram Archives, which in turn led to Crompton assembling the Archigram Exhibit. Crompton died on 21 January 2025, aged 89.
