= Reyner Banham =

British architectural critic (1922–1988)

Reyner Banham Hon FRIBA
- Born: Peter Reyner Banham; 2 March 1922; Norwich, England
- Died: 19 March 1988 (aged 66); London, England
- Education: Courtauld Institute of Art
- Occupation: Architectural historian
- Known for: Architecture and design criticism
- Notable work: Theory and Design in the First Machine Age (1960); The New Brutalism (1966); Los Angeles: the Architecture of Four Ecologies (1971)

Peter Reyner Banham (2 March 1922 – 19 March 1988) was an English architectural critic and writer best known for his theoretical treatise Theory and Design in the First Machine Age (1960) and for his 1971 book Los Angeles: The Architecture of Four Ecologies. In the latter he categorized the Los Angeles experience into four ecological models (Surfurbia, Foothills, The Plains of Id, and Autopia) and explored the distinct architectural cultures of each. A frequent visitor to the United States from the early 1960s, he relocated there in 1976.

== Early life and education ==
Peter Reyner Banham was born in Norwich, England to Percy Banham, a gas engineer, and Violet Frances Maud Reyner. He was educated at Norwich School and gained an engineering scholarship with the Bristol Aeroplane Company, where he spent much of the Second World War. In Norwich he gave art lectures, wrote reviews for the local paper and was involved with the Maddermarket Theatre. In 1949 Banham entered the Courtauld Institute of Art in London where he pursued architectural studies under Anthony Blunt, Sigfried Giedion and Nikolaus Pevsner. Pevsner, who was his doctoral supervisor, invited Banham to study the history of modern architecture, following his own work Pioneers of the Modern Movement (1936). He earned a B.A., then a Ph.D.

== Career ==
Having previously written regular exhibition reviews for ArtReview, then titled Art News and Review, Banham began working for the Architectural Review in 1952. In its December 1955 issue, he contributed an essay titled "The New Brutalism", in which he sought to stylistically define New Brutalism. His hypotheses were widely discussed and debated among members of Team X and other groups involved in urban planning at the time. "Banham became a respected commentator and critic of architecture through his writings in Architectural Review," notes a page on Banham on the (SUNY) Buffalo University Archives site, "and by holding regular informal gatherings to discuss contemporary art and design."

Banham had connections with the Independent Group, the 1956 This Is Tomorrow art exhibition (considered by many to be the birth of pop art), and the exponents of Brutalist architecture, which he documented in his 1966 book The New Brutalism: Ethic or Aesthetic?. Before this, in Theory and Design in the First Machine Age (1960), he had cut across Pevsner's main theories, linking modernism to build structures in which the 'functionalism' was actually subject to formal considerations. Later, he wrote a Guide to Modern Architecture (1962, republished in 1975 under the title Age of the Masters, a Personal View of Modern Architecture).

Banham predicted a "second age" of the machine and mass consumption. The Architecture of the Well-Tempered Environment (1969) follows Giedion's Mechanization Takes Command (1948), putting the development of technologies such as electricity and air conditioning ahead of the classic account of structures. In the 1960s, Cedric Price, Peter Cook, and the Archigram group also found this to be an engaging subject for thought.

Los Angeles: The Architecture of Four Ecologies (1971) is one of Banham's most enduringly popular titles. "Partial, polemical, and maddeningly disorganized, Reyner Banham’s 1971 Los Angeles: The Architecture of Four Ecologies nevertheless ranks with Steen Eiler Rasmussen’s London: The Unique City and Rem Koolhaas’s Delirious New York as one of the most generous and discerning tributes by an architectural visitor to a great 20th-century metropolis," writes the professor of architecture and urban planning Robert Fishman in the Harvard Design Magazine.

Banham in the mid-’60s was already preoccupied with the failure of the modern movement to make good on its promise of a purified new architecture in a purified new city. He was deeply impressed with the British group Archigram and its “Plug-In City,” which offered a Pop-influenced technological utopia of constant change. In Los Angeles he discovered a real-life “Plug-In City”—“seventy miles square but rarely seventy years deep”—whose energized sprawl embodied the “endlessness and indeterminacy” he now sought in architecture and urbanism.

Green thinking (Los Angeles: The Architecture of Four Ecologies), together with the oil crisis of 1973, had an impact on Banham's thought. "But his response to environmentalism and early ‘green’ thinking was highly critical," Owen Hatherley contends, in his review of Richard J. Williams’s Reyner Banham Revisited. "Banham, Williams writes, was against ‘a perspective on construction that favored adaptation and reuse over new development.' ... Radical environmentalism seemed to Banham like another de haut en bas movement of middle-class intellectuals telling others how to live, whereas the modern architecture he celebrated, from Futurism to Brutalism, was based on making new things possible."

At odds with the emerging 'postmodern' aesthetic, he adopted a political stance that earned him a reputation as the conscience of postwar British architecture. He broke with utopian and technical formalism. In Scenes in America Deserta (1982), he talks of open spaces and his anticipation of a 'modern' future. In A Concrete Atlantis: U.S. Industrial Building and European Modern Architecture, 1900–1925 (1986), he demonstrated the influence of American grain elevators and "daylight" factories on the Bauhaus and other modernist projects in Europe.

Banham was a prolific journalist (of some 750 articles), both within and outside of the architectural press, including regular columns in New Statesman (1958–1963) and New Society (1966-1988). "Known for his direct and sometimes brisk style," he was "praised for his lucid and informative" prose," notes the (SUNY) Buffalo University Archives website, "which didn't bog the reader down in jargon or details."

Selected articles were collected in Design by Choice, edited by Penny Sparke, and A Critic Writes (which includes a full bibliography), edited by his wife Mary Banham and others. He also created and narrated the 1964 television documentary A City Crowned with Green, about the growth of the London urban area.

=== Teaching ===
Banham taught at the Bartlett School of Architecture, University College London from 1966 to 1972. In 1976, he joined the State University of New York (SUNY) Buffalo's School of Architecture and Environmental Design as chair of the design studies department, according to the University Archives website."Buffalo, being a waning industrial city, was an ideal location to study the impact of industrial architecture," the Archives page notes. "Using Buffalo as a resource, Banham published Buffalo Architecture: A Guide (1981) and A Concrete Atlantis (1986). In 1980, he left Buffalo to become professor of art history at the University of California Santa Cruz, a post he held until 1987, when he was appointed Sheldon H. Solow Professor of the History of Architecture at the Institute of Fine Arts, New York University. He was diagnosed with cancer shortly thereafter and died before he was able to assume his duties. Banham died on March 19, 1988 at the University College Hospital in London.

In 2014, The Bartlett established a named chair appointment of the Reyner Banham Professor of Architectural History and Theory.

== Awards and tributes ==
In his book on Los Angeles, Banham said that he learned to drive so he could read the city in the original. Based on the book, Banham collaborated with the BBC on the 50-minute documentary, Reyner Banham Loves Los Angeles (1972), which shows footage of him driving through the city, visiting key architectural sites. In a short film, Professor Richard Williams discusses the importance of this documentary for bringing attention to LA's architecture and presenting it as a 'super city of the future'.

In 1988 Banham was awarded the Sir Misha Black award and was added to the College of Medallists.

== Criticism ==
In 2003, Nigel Whiteley published a critical biography of Banham, Reyner Banham: Historian of the Immediate Future, in which he gives an in-depth overview of Banham's work and ideas.

== Bibliography ==
- Theory and Design in the First Machine Age. Praeger. 1960. Theory and Design in the First Machine Age (Second ed.). Praeger. 1967.
- Guide to Modern Architecture. Architectural Press. ISBN 978-0-85139-261-5.
- "The New Brutalism". The Architectural Review. 1955.
- The New Brutalism. Architectural Press. 1966.
- Architecture of the Well-Tempered Environment. Architectural Press. 1969. ISBN 978-0-85139-073-4. Architecture of the Well-tempered Environment (Second, revised ed.). Architectural Press. 1984. ISBN 978-0-85139-749-8.
- Los Angeles: The Architecture of Four Ecologies. Harper and Row. 1971. ISBN 978-0-7139-0209-9.
- Megastructure. Thames and Hudson. 1976.
- Scenes in America Deserta. Thames and Hudson. 1982. ISBN 978-0-500-01292-5.
- A Concrete Atlantis: US Industrial Building and European Modern Architecture. MIT Press. 1989. ISBN 978-0-262-52124-6.
- “Hawks, Doves, and Flights of Fancy.” Wilson Quarterly vol. 3, no. 1, 1979, pp. 128–34. online
- “The New Brutalism.” October, vol. 136, 2011, pp. 19–28. online
