= Jeffrey Steele (artist) =

British artist (1931–2021)

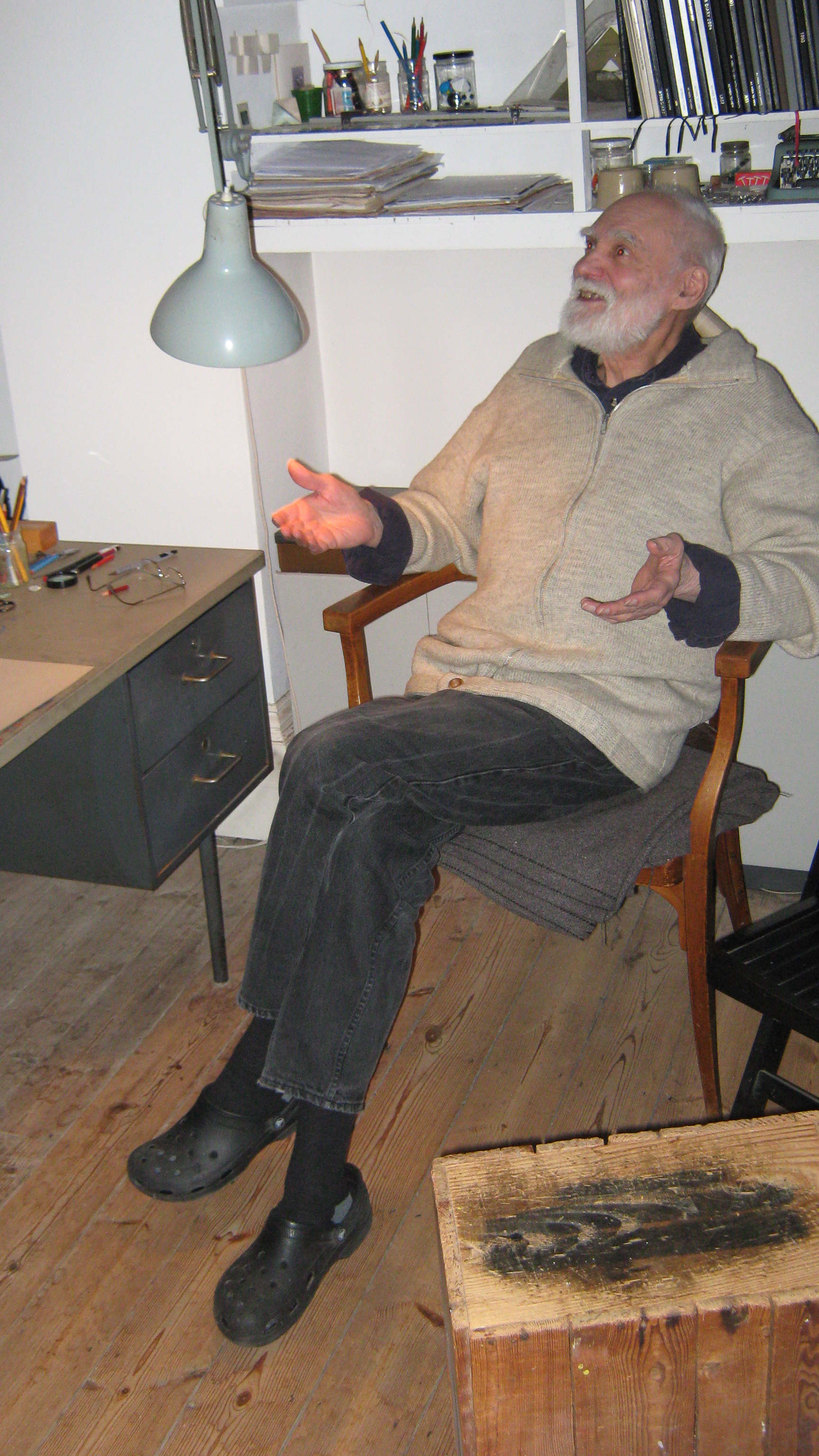
Jeffrey Steele in his studio, February 2014

Jeffrey Steele (1931–2021) was an abstract painter and founder of the Systems Group.

In Paris (1959) he encountered the work of artists working in the mode of geometric abstraction, such as Victor Vasarely (1906–97), Max Bill (1908–94) and Josef Albers (1888–1976), and adopted a lifelong abstract approach. For eight years he worked purely in black and white and was identified with the Op-art movement. He incorporated other colours into his work in the 1970s.

His work has been exhibited in London, Paris, New York, Milan, the Venice Biennale (1986), and elsewhere in Europe and the Americas. He has participated in more than 100 group exhibitions and had 17 one-man shows, the first at the Institute of Contemporary Arts in London in 1961. His works are in a number of public collections in the UK, including Tate Britain, the British Museum, the Victoria & Albert Museum, the National Museum of Wales in Cardiff, Walker Art Gallery in Liverpool, the Fitzwilliam Museum in Cambridge, the Arts Council and the Department of the Environment, and in other countries. Steele's painting Gespenstische Gestalt (1961–62) was shown in the exhibition "Dynamo, Un Siècle de Lumière et de Mouvement dans l'Art 1913/2013" at the Grand Palais in Paris in 2013.

After he had gained a reputation as a practising artist in the early 1960s Steele was accepted by the college authorities with which he had previously tussled and he began lecturing in fine art in Cardiff, Barry and Newport. He then lectured at Portsmouth Polytechnic from May 1968 until December 1989.

He was a member of the Portsmouth Sinfonia experimental orchestra organised by Gavin Bryars for BA students and staff in Fine Art at Portsmouth Polytechnic in 1970, playing trombone. He can be heard on the BA show invitation 45 rpm of the William Tell overture.

== Early life to 1960 ==
Jeffrey Steele was born on 3 July 1931 in Cardiff, the son of a slate fireplace enameller, Arthur, and Enid (née Washer), who worked in a Woolworth's store. He attended Howard Gardens High School in Cardiff, where his teachers encouraged his artistic work.

In 1948 Steele enrolled at Cardiff School of Art with a scholarship. After quarrels with the teaching staff he transferred to Newport School of Art, but he did not complete the course there.

As a pacifist, he was a conscientious objector to National Service; he was originally exempted only from combatant military service, but on appeal he was exempted from any military service, conditional upon performing civilian work. His refusal to undertake National Service led to him being forced out of the family home.

During the 1950s he maintained a studio in Cardiff and experimented with representational styles.

During the 1950s Steele worked figuratively while being employed as a Rediffusion radio technician and also engaging in a programme of self-education in European languages and philosophy, as well as art. He was particularly influenced by the allegorical style of Stanley Spencer (1891–1959). Steele's painting Christ Carrying the Cross (1952-3, set in Adamsdown, Cardiff) was shown at the Royal Academy in London in summer 1953 and caused controversy in his home town because of its satirical message. Steele took a studio and later a flat in High Street, Cardiff, which became a meeting point for his artistic and intellectual contemporaries in the city. He also lived in London in 1956–57, working as a storeman at the Stoll Theatre until its demolition.

Steele had been studying Cézanne, Cubism and the Abstract Expressionists but said later: "I mistrusted the deliberate bypassing of the thinking part of the mind which gestural painting entails and some love of the philosophical method of Descartes predisposed me towards a rational and austere form."

In 1959 he won a French government scholarship to study in Paris, initially for three months. There he visited the show "Antagonismes" at the musée des Arts décoratifs, and saw the work of Auguste Herbin (1882–1960), Max Bill, Richard Paul Lohse (1902–1988), the Venezuelan Jesús Rafael Soto (1923–2005) and, especially influential for Steele, Victor Vasarely. He determined to start afresh and when he returned to Cardiff he destroyed all figurative work in his possession.

He started with what could not be eliminated while still being an artist making pictures: the two essentials, first a blank white (when primed) canvas, and second, an element (or elements) of black, these two (figure and ground) interacting with each other. From this simplest possible binary situation he built up a new practice, beginning with depictions of ovoid forms.

== Principles and aims ==
Each work is underlaid by its own set of mathematic relationships that, once chosen intuitively, determines the elements depicted to produce a unified, harmonious whole, which is independent of any outside object (as in figurative art) or the artist's emotions (as in Abstract Expressionism). Typically, equal vertical and horizontal divisions of the canvas are cut through with intersecting diagonals, and new lines taken from intersections, to produce a system of superimposed grids or nets. On these are built the shapes, lines, curves, blocks of colour or spatial divisions that form the elements of the picture. The elements are repeated but subject to the effects of incremental changes according to logical progressions. They interact and interpenetrate to allow the viewer to make new, multiple connections and see new patterns. As in a half-tone photograph, the image appears to be more meaningful than the elements that make it up. This effect, says the critic Gloria Carnevali, can be seen as forming "a new third dimension, one that exists between the painting and the observer", even a "new pictorial space". The use in Steele's work of elements in balanced opposition, and the tilted axes arising from the diagonals, produce symmetrical wholes that are not static but dynamic, complex and full of apparent movement, especially rotational, the eye eventually returning to its starting point before beginning a new journey around the picture.

While modern in their pure abstraction, purged of references to the world outside the picture, Steele's works, in their systems of proportion, balance and measurement, in their use of geometric forms (particularly circles and polygons such as triangles and squares), and in their strong contrasts of light and dark (chiaroscuro) in their composition, are prefigured by much older art and architecture, and have a timeless quality. Steele's aim is visual experimentation and investigation, to answer questions such as "what would that look like?", a journey in collaboration with the viewer on the basis of equal status. The result, while being potentially satisfying, interesting and appealing for a viewer, is not primarily intended to provide aesthetic pleasure and sensory enjoyment ("I like that"), or to elicit an emotionally sympathetic response or admiration for the artist's skill or insight ("That's good"), or to satisfy the art market. The artist is kept firmly in the background.

In a statement concerning his work Steele proposes "to abolish as far as possible subjective, contingent and random factors in favour of a principle of necessity; to develop a pictorial context conforming to this principle and to render this principle as intelligible as possible".

== Op art in the 1960s ==
Steele's painting Baroque Experiment – Fred Maddox (1962/63) featured prominently in a Time magazine article on Op-art, "Pictures that Attack the Eye", in October 1964. It was then shown in "The Responsive Eye", an exhibition of mainly Op-art in the Museum of Modern Art in New York in February–April 1965, organised by William Seitz, which also included work by the British artists Michael Kidner (1917–2009) and Bridget Riley (1931–). Steele spent three weeks in the city, meeting critics and artists such as Josef Albers, Fritz Glarner (1899–1972), Richard Huelsenbeck (1892–1974), Ad Reinhardt (1913–1967) and Andy Warhol (1928–87), visiting galleries and staying in the Chelsea Hotel. He was interviewed by the film-maker Brian De Palma (1940–) for his documentary about the exhibition. He has been identified with the Op-art movement because he has worked in black and white, especially in the 1960s, and his paintings feature clear, hard edges, sharp, even dazzling contrasts, figure-ground ambiguity and kinetic effects. However Steele's aim is not to exploit optical illusions for spectacular effect, such as to produce retinal after-images to cause visual disturbance or interference, reversible perspective (objects that seem to both advance and recede), the illusion of vibration and shimmer – all derided as tricks or gimmicks by some art critics. In Steele's work any such distortions are the side-effects of the underlying systems of his works.

Steele was a member of 56 Group Wales from 1963 to 1974, and a life / honorary member after 1974.

== Systems Group (1970) ==
Steele was the founder of the Systems Group, together with Malcolm Hughes in 1970. The group included Michael Kidner, Peter Sedgley, Gillian Wise, Peter Lowe, Colin Jones, David Saunders, Jean Spencer, John Ernest, Richard Allen and others.

The group arose through an exhibition of nine artists, "Systeemi-System", organised by Steele and his then wife, the textile designer Arja Nenonen (1936–2011), at the Amos Anderson Museum in Helsinki, capital of Nenonen's native Finland, in 1969. The exhibition was subtitled by Steele "An Exhibition of Syntactic Art from Britain", the word "syntactic" referring to the work "being constructed from a vocabulary of largely geometric forms in accordance with pre-determined and often mathematically-based systems". The Helsinki show was followed by a similar one called "Matrix" at the Arnolfini Gallery in Bristol and the 1972/3 Arts Council touring exhibition "Systems" which opened at the Whitechapel Gallery in London in March 1972. This was followed by "Systems II" at the Polytechnic of Central London in 1973. Individual members showed at the Lucy Milton gallery in Notting Hill, London, up to 1975, and in continental Europe during the 1970s and afterwards. The group ceased to exist in 1976 following political disagreements, but a number of its members remained on friendly terms and exhibited together.

The Arts Council of Great Britain put on a touring exhibition of 15 artists called "Constructive Context" in 1978–9, curated by Stephen Bann, which brought together members of the former Systems group, and Gillian Wise organised a constructivist section in the 1978 Hayward annual exhibition.

== Neglect in the UK, 1980s and 1990s ==
Between the two groups of Systems-related exhibitions (in the 1970s and the revival of interest in 2005–2008), Steele and other former members of the group and related artists continued to exhibit widely in continental Europe, eastern Europe and Russia, and had works bought for public collections there. However, in the UK the attention of the art world shifted to conceptualism. Steele and his associates may also have suffered from a perception of their art as cold or inscrutable. Furthermore, the group has also been associated with the political left and Russian Constructivism of the early Soviet era, and many of its members (including Steele) see a strong affinity between their art and Marxism. But at a time when the Cold War was raging and Thatcherism was in the ascendancy the work of Steele and his contemporaries did not find general favour in UK art circles. Meanwhile, it was also distrusted by many on the revolutionary left as allegedly elitist, being not readily appreciated by the masses. During his time at Portsmouth Fine Art Department, Steele was a leading member of the professional association called Group Proceedings that was intended for artists to theorise on constructive art practices. At Portsmouth he led the seminar "Some Questions Concerning Fine Art and the Propagation of Ideas by Means of Images" which became known (affectionately and otherwise due to its Marxist content) as the "Ideology Course", from which there are extensive papers and one of the direct and indirect outcomes of this is the theoretical work of Gary Tedman and Iona Singh.

== Revival of interest, 2005–2008 ==
After the "Constructive Context" exhibition of 1978-79 it was not until 2005 that a similar exhibition was held. This was at Southampton City Art Gallery, called "Elements of Abstraction: Space, Line and Interval in Modern British Art", curated by Professor Brandon Taylor and Dr Alan Fowler of Winchester School of Art. This was followed by "Towards a Rational Aesthetic: Constructive Art in Post-war Britain" at the Osborne Samuel Gallery in London in 2007 and "A Rational Aesthetic", a second exhibition at Southampton City Art Gallery in 2008. All of these featured the work of Steele and like-minded artists. The 2008 show also featured the work of Anthony Hill (1930–2020), Kenneth Martin (1905–1984), Mary Martin (1907–69), and Victor Pasmore (1908–98) – a leading figure in the revival of Constructivism in America and Britain in the 1940s – and all of whom were founders of the British Constructivists in the 1950s, and forerunners of the Systems Group in the 1970s.

== Personal life ==
Steele was married twice, to Glenda Reynolds with whom he had two children, Simon (born 1958) and Tamara (born 1959), and to the Finnish artist-weaver Arja Nenonen. After his second marriage ended he had a relationship with the artist Judy Clark, with whom he had a daughter, the artist Clara Clark.

Steele was interviewed extensively by the researcher Cathy Courtney for the Artists' Lives section of the British Library's National Life Stories project. The British Library also holds a collection of video recordings made by Steele in his home and studio between 1997 and 2011.

Steele lived and worked in Southsea, Hampshire. He died on 21 June 2021.
