= Systems Group =

Organisation of fine artists (1969 to 1976)

The Systems Group, or simply Systems group, was a group of British artists working in the constructivist tradition. The group was formed after an inaugural Helsinki exhibition in 1969 entitled Systeemi•System. The exhibition coordinator Jeffrey Steele together with Malcolm Hughes, invited the participating artists to form a group in 1970. The Systems Group had no manifesto and no formal membership; it existed for the purpose of discussion and exhibition rather than direct collaboration.

Some group members were influenced by Swiss Concrete artists, including Richard Paul Lohse; some by the Op art of the Groupe de Recherche d'Art Visuel. Others were influenced by the Constructionists: Victor Pasmore, Mary Martin, Kenneth Martin and Anthony Hill. "Above all, they shared a commitment to a non-figurative art that was not abstracted from the appearance of nature but constructed from within and built up of balanced relations of clear, geometric forms."

The group disbanded in 1976 following political differences among its members. Despite this, individual members kept in touch and exhibited together for over four decades.

== Membership ==
The core members of the Systems Group were:

- Jeffrey Steele (1931–2021)
- Malcolm Hughes (1920–1997)
- Michael Kidner (1917–2009)
- Jean Spencer (1942–1998)
- Peter Lowe (1938–)
- David Saunders (1936–)
- Peter Sedgley (1930–2025)
- John Ernest (1922–1994)
- Gillian Wise (1936–2020)

The following artists exhibited with the group:

- Michael Tyzack (1933–2007)
- Colin Jones (1934–)
- Richard Allen (1933–1999)
- Geoffrey Smedley (1927–2018)
- James Moyes (1937–)
- John Law (1941–)
- Norman Dilworth (1931–2023)

Gillian Wise and John Ernest had previously exhibited with the Constructionist Group. Regarding group meetings, although Steele brought the group together and was a key member, Hughes subsequently took over the running of the group, which met regularly at his Putney studio.

== Beginnings ==
In November 1969, nine artists selected by Jeffrey Steele exhibited in an exhibition entitled Systeemi•System: An exhibition of syntactic art from Britain at the invitation of the Amos Anderson Art Museum in Helsinki. The exhibition was organised by Steele's Finnish wife Arja Nenonen (1936–2011) and the exhibiting artists were: Malcolm Hughes, Michael Kidner, Peter Lowe, David Saunders, Peter Sedgley, Jean Spencer, Jeffrey Steele, Michael Tyzack and Gillian Wise. Steele chose artists whose interests were associated with his own developing interest in the theory of syntax in art. Each artist selected a different choice of elements, using some kind of rational principle to construct their work.

== Syntactic Art ==
Syntactic art considers syntactic (structural) relationships between artwork elements more important than any semantic (referential) or pragmatic (expressive) relationships. In other words, in syntactic art the structure and form of the artwork takes precedence over its figurative representation or the viewer's interpretation.

According to semiotician Charles Morris "language is a social system of signs mediating the responses of members of the community to one another and to their environment." Additionally "to understand a language or to use it correctly is to follow the rules of usage (syntactical, semantical, and pragmatical) current in the given social community."

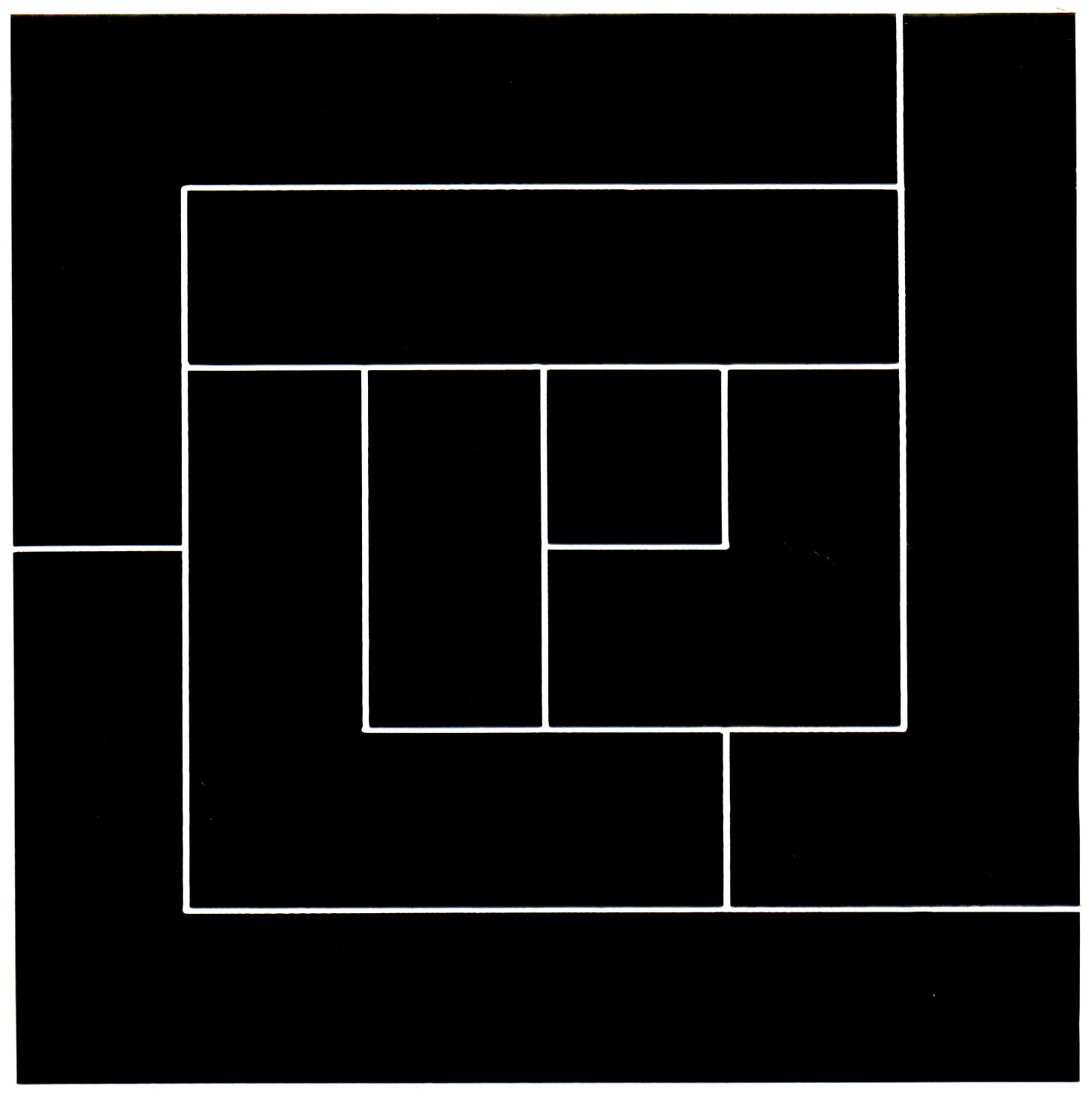
Spiral of 8 Integers

Semiotics is the science of semiosis: studying the relationships between signs (syntactics), what they designate (semantics), and how they are interpreted by an agent (pragmatics).

Anthony Hill appropriated Morris's syntactic-semantic-pragmatic framework into his own work, which in turn influenced some members of the Systems Group. 'By syntactic, Hill meant "the relations in the constituent structure, the internal plastic logic", or, put more simply, what happens within the paintings.'

A clear example of Syntactic Art, or Constructionist Art, is found in Peter Lowe's "Spiral of 8 integers" where, starting from the central square, a sequence of integers is added until the square root of the sum is found to be a whole number, i.e. (1 + 2 + 3 + 4 + 5 + 6 + 7 + 8) = 36, and $\sqrt{36}$ = 6. Lowe presents the syntactic relationship visually as a spiral pattern of smaller squares, culminating in the outer 6 x 6 square. Although it is possible to view his work mathematically, Lowe emphasises that he discovered this relationship empirically.

== Political Milieu ==
The Cold War lasted from 1945 to 1991. In the short period of its existence the Systems Group accepted the label of Constructivist, but this term was identified with Russia and hence associated with "The Evil Empire". Quoting Peter Lowe: "In the art world, the CIA was covertly ensuring the supremacy of Abstract Expressionism and Minimalism over Russian Constructivism and Formalism as an element of US Cold War propaganda. Local abstract expressionists proliferated in the UK and Abstract Expressionism was promoted in art schools. Journalists and directors of our national institutions favoured US art and linked their careers to it. There was also a good deal of tabloid comment with Syntactic work being invariably labelled 'cold and clinical'. The term 'system' had acquired negative connotations and it was an act of defiance on our part to use it in relation to our group."

== Political Differences ==
Several members of the Systems Group held the view that all acts were political, therefore art was a vehicle for political ideology. At the time, Lowe could not agree, feeling his visual research was apolitical, having been influenced by the writings of Theo van Doesburg's in his essay "An Answer to the Question: Should the New Art Serve the Proletariat?". Things came to a head at a meeting in 1976, after which Lowe resigned from the group. The remaining members found no resolution to their political differences and disbanded shortly afterwards.

== Selected Group exhibitions ==
=== While the group was active ===
- 1969: Systeemi•System: An exhibition of syntactic art from Britain, Amos Andersonin taidemuseo, Helsinki.
- 1971: Matrix, Arnolfini Gallery, Bristol.
- 1972-3: Systems, Whitechapel Gallery touring show, London.
- 1973: Systems II, Polytechnic of Central London, London.

=== After the group disbanded ===
- 1978: Constructive Context, Arts Council Great Britain.
- 1978: Constructivist section, Annual Exhibition of the Hayward Gallery, London.
- 1980: PIER+OCEAN: Construction in the art of the seventies, Hayward Gallery, London.
- 1981: Konstrukcja w Procesie [Construction in Process], Budrem plant, Łodź.
- 2008: A Rational Aesthetic: The Systems Group and Associated Artists, Southampton City Art Gallery, Southampton.

Following the decline of the Systems Group, other groups of British constructivists emerged, such as Group Proceedings (1979–1983), Exhibiting Space (1983–1989), the journal Constructivist Forum (1985–1991), and Countervail.

== See also ==
- Constructionist Group
- Constructivism
- Neglect in the UK, 1980s and 1990s
