= Peter Sedgley =

English artist (1930–2025)

- Born: 19 March 1930; London, England
- Died: 16 March 2025 (aged 94); Worthing, England
- Education: Brixton Technical School, London
- Occupation: Artist
- Movement: Op art Kinetic art
- Spouse(s): Marguerite Wiltshire (m. 1951) Ingeborg Lommatzsch (m. 1996)
- Children: 2

Peter Sedgley (Note: His name is sometimes misspelt as Sedgeley) (19 March 1930 – 17 March 2025) was an English visual artist associated with Op art and Kinetic art. He co-founded SPACE, which is the oldest continuously operating art studio in London, and the Artist Information Registry (AIR) with Bridget Riley in 1968.

== Personal Life ==
Peter Sedgley was born in London on 19 March 1930. His father was a railway engineer. He studied building and architecture at Brixton School of Building from 1943 to 1947. From 1948 to 1950 he completed national service with the Royal Army Ordnance Corps (RAOC) in Egypt. He worked as an architectural assistant from 1950 to 1958. In 1960 he set up a small design and construction firm making “prototype dwellings”. In 1963 he began to make art full-time. In 1968 he co-created SPACE with Bridget Riley and Peter Townsend. In a 1967 interview he said, “I wanted to concern myself with philosophy. I felt the need to get away and involve myself with the investigation of ideas... and this led me to painting.”

Sedgley married Marguerite Erica Wiltshire in 1951. They had two children. They divorced and he married Ingeborg Lommatzsch in 1996. Sedgley and Lommatzsch remained together until her death in 2023; Sedgley died shortly after on 16 March 2025.

== Art career ==
Sedgley was "entirely self-taught" as an artist. He was initially influenced by Bridget Riley, Harry Thubron and Bruce Lacey. As his work progressed, he developed "a preference for circular forms."

Sedgley met Riley in 1961. Of his influence on her, she said "I did not know how to make a curve, even how to use a ruler, till I met Peter. I was still working on my kitchen table. He had to teach me geometry so that I could make the things I knew ought to be." In the mid-1960s Sedgley and Riley taught at Byam Shaw Art School, Kensington where one of his students was James Dyson. About Sedgley and Riley, Dyson said, "From them I learnt how to see and understand form, and ultimately how to draw it."

In 1966, the Canadian art dealer, Jack Pollock took some of Sedgley's pieces, together with ones by David Hockney, Richard Hamilton and Riley, to exhibit in his gallery in Canada, about which he wrote, "I realised that a show of this work in Canada could have a tremendous impression, not just on buyers, but on artists. I thought they would do very well to be able to see, absorb, really look at this inspiring new work. And they did – they learned a great deal."

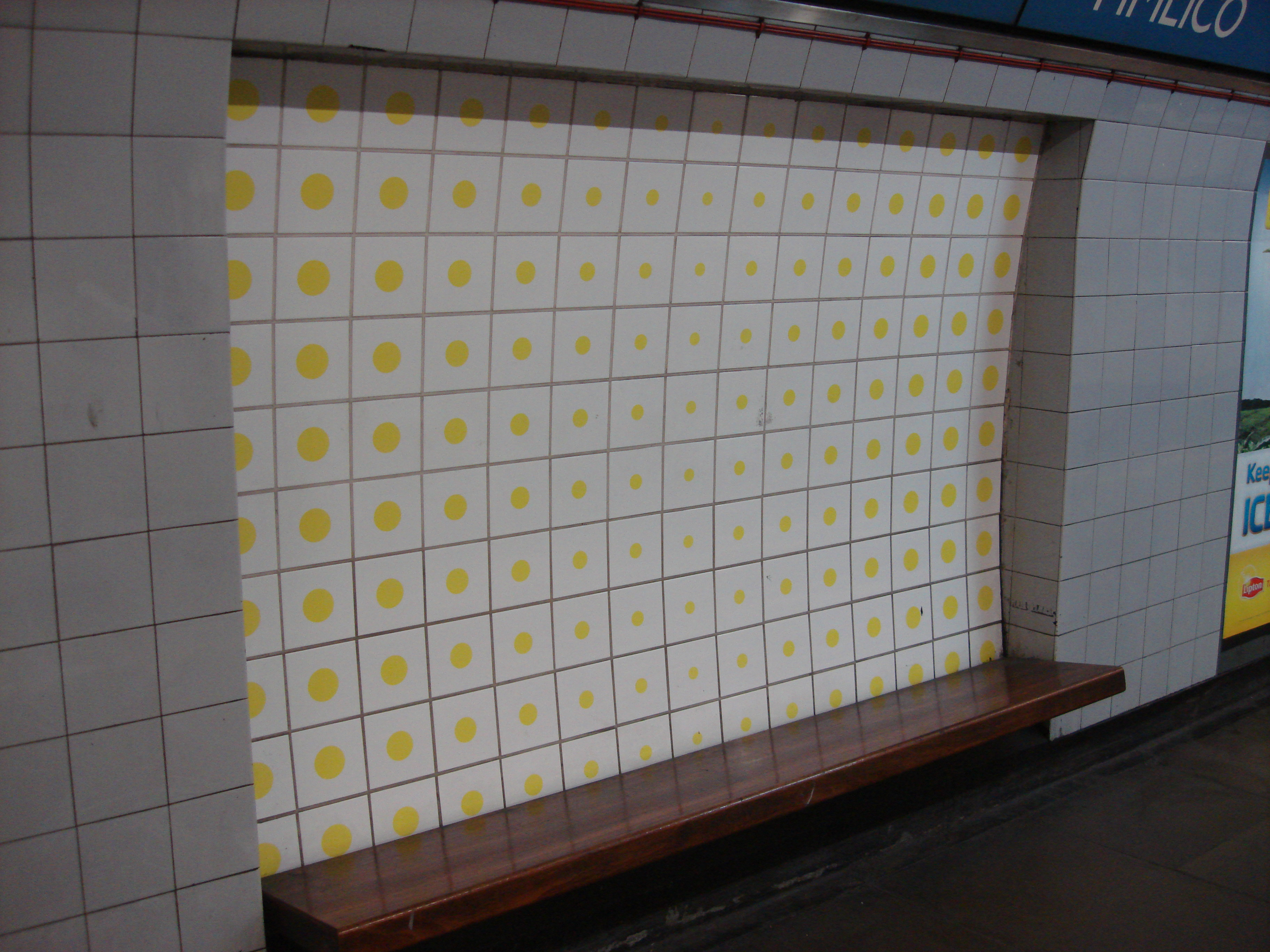
Sedgley's 1971 design for the Pimlico London Underground station

On 5 March 1968, an event later described as an "action-happening", took place at the Tate Gallery. French sculptor César Baldaccini had been invited to create a work using quick-drying polyurethane foam as part of a presentation for Tate members. As the sculpture set, Sedgley and the performance artist Stuart Brisley removed sections of it, transported them to the gallery’s front entrance, impaled them on the railings, and set them on fire. They left the scene before the police arrived.

In the late 1960s, Sedgley became interested in the possibilities of using coloured light. This interest began accidentally while setting up lights for an evening exhibition. While trying to find a form of light which approximated most closely to daylight, he became aware of the varying effects of different lights on his targets. This experimentation led ultimately to Sedgley's creation of art using artificial light. His first work using electric light was a "light ballet", a moving light installation at Trinity College Dublin, and the Camden Arts Centre, London, in 1970.

His experiments led to the creation of "videorotors", painted discs programmed with patterns of light, using coloured light, filters, ultraviolet and stroboscopic light. Together with Frank Stella, he was "among the first painters to make use of fluorescent materials" in his work.

Sedgley worked in London until 1971 when he moved to West Berlin as part of the DAAD (German Academic Exchange Service) Berlin Artists Programme. Pimlico tube station opened in 1972 showcasing British design. Sedgley had been commissioned to design the tiles for this underground station. He remained in Berlin after the formal exchange ended, but had returned to London by the 1990s. He considered his work "'international' in spirit."

In Germany, Sedgley was "mostly concerned with the use of electric light and kinetic sculpture." His first permanent installation was "Night and Day" at Hermann Ehlers Platz Steglitz in 1974. He also experimented with the addition of music to his installations, for example at Donaueschingen Festival in 1974, when he employed music directed by Jörg Höller. Around this time, he also worked with composers Eberhardt Blum and Morton Subotnik.

== SPACE and AIR ==
In 1968, Sedgley and Riley were using Riley's house in Notting Hill as their studio, but their work started to become too large for the space. Riley said "Peter wanted to build a geodesic dome in the house, and he did it," however, it was "a tight squeeze". In the same year, they developed the idea of an Artists Information Registry (AIR), a "central repository of information about artists' work, which would be available for open consultation".This meant that buyers could contact artists directly, cutting out the need for agents. The need for somewhere to physically store this information led to the idea of a location that would house both AIR and artist studios.

In January 1969, inspired by studios they had seen while in New York for The Responsive Eye exhibition, SPACE (Space Provision Artistic Cultural and Educational) was established at St Katharine Dock, London, as a "scheme for artists' studios." Sedgley was secretary of the organisation and worked almost exclusively on the running of both SPACE and AIR.

The success of SPACE led Sedgley to develop a similar set-up in Berlin. The first exhibition, London Now in Berlin, featuring the artists who were using the London SPACE studios, was held at Messehalle, Berlin in 1971.

== Group membership ==
In November 1969, Sedgley became a founding member of the Systems Group which also included Richard Allen, Peter Loew, Jean Spencer and Gillian Wise. They "developed canvases and constructions organised in arrangements free from painterly 'accident', subjective sensation or emotion, exhibiting regular constants and variables."

Together with Bruce Lacey, John Latham and others, he created a group called "Whscht" (how one might spell the sound of a whistle) which staged "happenings" that were designed to provoke a response from the person in the street. He gave an example: "If newspapers were blowing around Tottenham Court Road, we'd come along and glue them down. The point was to provoke, to see how the public responded."

== Selected exhibitions ==
Year	Exhibition	Location	Detail
1965	One-man exhibition	McRoberts and Tunnard Gallery, London	
1965	One-man exhibition	Howard Wise Gallery, New York	
1965	The Responsive Eye	Museum of Modern Art, New York	Also featuring Albers, Vasarely, Riley and Stella
1966	9th Mainichi Biennale	Tokyo	
1966	One-man exhibition	Richard Feigen Gallery, Chicago	
1968	One-man exhibition	Galerie Neuendorf, Hamburg	
1968	British Drawing Exhibition	Museum of Modern Art, New York	
1969	Light Show	Greenwich Theatre Art Gallery, London	
1971	London Now In Berlin	Messehalle, Berlin	
1971	One-man exhibition	Haus am Waldsee, Berlin	
1973	10 year retrospective	Ikon Gallery, Birmingham	
1974	One-man show	Arnolfini gallery, Bristol	
1986	42nd Venice Biennale	Venice	
1988	Sculpture	Cardiff Public Library, Wales	
1993	The Sixties Art Scene	Barbican Art Gallery, London	
1993	Ready, Steady, Go	Touring	Featuring 1960s paintings from the Arts Council's collection
1997	Colorama	Conference Centre, Dubai	A solar activated mobile of glass and steel
1998	Charged Light	Royal Academy, Stockholm	
2004	One-man exhibition	Austin/Desmond Gallery, London	Kinetic works
2009	One-man exhibition	The Redfern Gallery, London	Retrospective

== Collections ==
Sedgley's work is in the following collections:

=== UK ===
Arts Council England, Arts Council of Northern Ireland, British Council, Manchester Art Gallery, Tate, Victoria and Albert Museum.

=== International ===
Art Museum of Atenuem (Finland), British Embassy, Berlin (Germany), Chase Manhattan Bank, NYC (USA), City Museum, St Louis (USA), Dartmouth College Museum and Galleries (USA), Indiana University Art Museum (USA), Museum of Modern Art, Rio de Janeiro (Brazil), Nagasaki Museum of History and Culture (Japan), Stuyvesant Foundation (South Africa), Walker Art Center (USA)

== Awards ==
- 1966 – Minister of Education award at Mainichi Biennale
- 1971 – Recipient of the DAAD (German Academic Exchange Service), Berlin Artists Programme
