= Hugo Demarco =

Argentine-born French painter

- Born: Hugo Rodolfo Demarco; July 13, 1932; Buenos Aires, Argentina
- Died: November 28, 1995 (aged 63); Aubervilliers, Paris, France
- Education: Escuela Nacional de Bellas Artes
- Style: Op art
- Movement: Kinetic art, Nouvelle Tendance

Hugo Demarco (13 July 1932—28 November 1995) was an Argentine-born French painter associated with the kinetic (op art) and Nouvelle Tendance movements. Demarco's work is concerned largely with color and movement and he often used prisms to reflect light and create movement. His work created "very active structures, in spite of the simplicity of their patterns" by using form, color, texture, and rhythm, including color degradation and chromatic contrasts, to create movement.

== Biography ==
Hugo Rodolfo Demarco was born in Buenos Aires, Argentina on 13 July 1932. He was of Italian descent and later spent time in Brescia, Italy.

After finishing his degree at Escuela Nacional de Bellas Artes in Buenos Aires in 1957, Demarco taught painting and design. Not long after, in 1959, he moved to Paris with Julio Le Parc and Horacio García Rossi, his former classmates, to join the French art scene. Demarco started creating kinetic artwork with other Latin American expat artists, including Argentinians Antonio Asis, Mariano Carrera, Carlos Agüero, and Armando Durante and Venezuelan Jesús Rafael Soto, in addition to Le Parc and García Rossi. He was among the early members of the Groupe de Recherche d'Art Visuel (GRAV), a group of visual artists including Le Parc, Soto, Sérgio de Camargo, and François Morellet, among others. He was also in Position, a group of Argentine geometrical artists living and working in Paris, including Antonio Asis, Carlos Agüero, and Armando Durante, upon its creation in 1971. He also served as a trainer for the PUC rugby club.

Demarco's first solo painting and relief exhibition was at Galerie Denise René in 1961. In 1963, he and other Latin American artists received a grant from the French government to stay in Paris and continue creating art. Demarco was featured in two documentaries within the Nouvelle Tendance movement: Le mouvement (1966) and Lumière et mouvement (1967). In 1967, he held a one-man exhibition at both the Op Gallery Esslingen and at Denise René's Hans Nager Gallery in Krefeld, Germany.

In June 1968, Demarco, Le Parc, and Costa Rican artist Juan Luis Rodriguez Sibaja were on their way to a pro-union demonstration in Flins when Demarco and Le Parc were arrested by the French military police. At this time, France was in a state of discontent and student protests were worrying the government, who thought they may go as far as civil war. Demarco and Le Parc were deported and spent several months in exile, initially staying in Belgium but later traveling through Germany, Italy, and Spain. During their absence, a number of foreign artists threatened to leave the country. The expulsion, however, gave Demarco and Le Parc the attention they were looking for as artists and suddenly found themselves in demand. Within a few months, they were allowed to return to France on the grounds that they would not engage in political activism again.

Demarco and his wife Amalia had children. He died in the Aubervilliers area of Paris on 28 November 1995. The highest recorded price for one of Demarco's paintings was a 2008 Sotheby's New York auction that sold Relief à Deplacement Continuel for US$67,000.

== Galleries ==
Among the many places in which his artwork has been displayed are:

Continent	Country	City	Museum/s	Ref
Europe	Austria	Vienna	Lower Belvedere	
Europe	Belgium	Antwerp	Galerie Ad Libitum	
Europe	Croatia	Zagreb	Galerija Suvremene Umjetnosti	
Europe	Denmark	Copenhagen	Galerie Hybler	
Europe	France	Paris	Musée des Arts Décoratifs, Musée d'Art Moderne de Paris, Mitterrand Gallery, Galerie Eva Mayer	
Europe	France	Bordeaux	Musée des Beaux-Arts de Bordeaux	
Europe	France	Rennes	Musée des Beaux-Arts	
Europe	France	Caen	Le Centre de recherche en esthétique	
Europe	Germany	Leverkusen	Morsbroich Museum	
Europe	Italy	Verona	Kromya Art Gallery	
Europe	Italy	Bologna	Galleria Cavour	
Europe	Italy	Rome	Galleria Nazionale d'Arte Moderna	
Europe	Italy	Brescia	Martini Studio D'Arte	
Europe	Italy	Genoa	Galleria la Polena	
Europe	Italy	Lecco	Galleria Giuli, Galleria Arieta	
Europe	Italy	Venice	Villa Pisani, Fondazione Querini Stampalia	
Europe	Russia	Saint Petersburg	Hermitage Museum	
Europe	San Marino	San Marino	Galleria di arte moderna e contemporanea	
Europe	Spain	Madrid	Museo Nacional Centro de Arte Reina Sofía, Museo de Arte Contemporáneo	
Europe	Switzerland	Bern	Kunsthalle Bern	
Europe	Switzerland	Zurich	Gimpel Hanover Galerie	
Europe	United Kingdom	Nottingham	Midland Group Gallery	
Europe	United Kingdom	London	Mayor Gallery	
North America	Canada	Ottawa	Wells Gallery	
North America	United States of America	New Canaan	Heather Gaudio Fine Art	
North America	United States of America	Lawrence	Spencer Museum of Art	
North America	United States of America	Minneapolis	Walker Art Center	
North America	United States of America	Buffalo	Albright–Knox Art Gallery	
North America	United States of America	New York City	Sidney Janis Gallery, Museum of Modern Art, Alpha137 Gallery	
North America	United States of America	Pittsburgh	Berger Gallery	
North America	United States of America	Houston	Sicardi Gallery	
South America	Argentina	Buenos Aires	Galería Rubbers	
South America	Argentina	La Plata	Museo de Arte Contemporáneo Latinoamericano	
South America	Brazil	São Paulo	Gabinete de Arte Raquel Arnaud	
South America	Chile	Santiago	Museo de la Solidaridad Salvador Allende	
South America	Venezuela	Caracas	Museo de Bellas Artes, Caracas Museum of Contemporary Art	
South America	Venezuela	Ciudad Bolívar	Jesús Soto Museum of Modern Art	
Asia	Israel	Tel Aviv	Tel Aviv Museum of Art	
Oceania	Australia	Sydney	Museum of Contemporary Art Australia	
