= Gerhard von Graevenitz =

German painter (1934–1983)

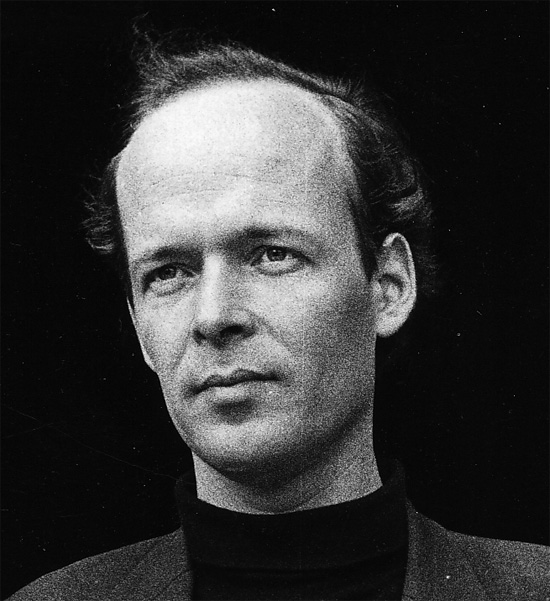
- 1966
- Born: Gerhard von Graevenitz; 19 September 1934; Schilde, Prignitz/Mark Brandenburg
- Died: 20 August 1983 (aged 48) near Habkern/Traubachtal, Switzerland
- Movement: Kinetic art, Op art, Nouvelle Tendance, Zero

Gerhard von Graevenitz (19 September 1934 Schilde, Prignitz/Mark Brandenburg – 20 August 1983, Habkern/Traubachtal) was a German kinetic artist, co-founding member of the Nouvelle Tendance and member of the op-art movement. He also belonged to the international circle of the Zero-Group. He is seen as one of the uncompromising representatives of the constructive-concrete art of the younger generation (since 1958).

== Life and work ==
Gerhard von Graevenitz' father was head of a district council ('Landrat'). As the youngest of four brothers (he had a twin sister), he studied economics at the University of Frankfurt (1955–1956), and at the Academy of Fine Arts, Munich (1956–1961). His professor there was Ernst Geitlinger. Together with Jürgen Morschel he edited the magazine nota, which appeared in four numbers (1959–1960) and was dedicated to international art and concrete poetry. Both started the gallery nota in Munich (1960/1961), showing solo-exhibitions of Otto Piene, Heinz Mack, Almir Mavignier, and François Morellet. They organized lectures, e.g. by the information-theorist Max Bense. In 1961, von Graevenitz lived in Paris, where he was in contact with the Groupe de Recherche d'Art Visuel (GRAV) and shared a studio with Julio Le Parc. In 1962 he was co-founder of the international movement Nouvelle Tendance (new tendencies, Neue Tendenzen). Until the group's break-up in 1965, he was one of the four organizers of the international group-shows, operating from Munich. The first solo-exhibition of his work was organized in 1962 at Gallery Roepcke in Wiesbaden. He participated in exhibitions such as "the Responsive Eye" (1965 created by curator WillaimC. Seitz at MoMA), New York and "Licht-Kunst-Licht" (1966) at Van Abbemuseum /Eindhoven. In 1970 he settled in Amsterdam. In the 1970s, he repeatedly worked as an independent organizer and curator of exhibitions, such as for the Dutch Pavilion of the Venice Biennale ("To do with nature", 1978 ), for the Kölnische Kunstverein ("Kunst < > Natur", 1980) and for the Hayward Gallery in London (1980, assisted by Norman Dilworth) and the Kröller-Müller Museum in Otterlo (1980) : "pier + ocean, Reflections on Construction in the 70's". In 1976 he co-founded the Internationales Künstlergremium and worked for it as its vice-president in 1978/79. From 1979 on he was a member of the board of Stichting de Appel in Amsterdam.

== Kinetics ==
In 1958, after initial painterly experiments with material, he began his white monochrome reliefs ("White Structures") with concave and/or convex points or circles, showing structures as progressions, degressions and chance constellations on a grid. In 1961, he created his first kinetic object, and, from 1963 onwards, light-objects, He installed his light-wall in 1966 (which was shown in London, Eindhoven and in 1970 at the Venice Biennale). He constructed "play-objects", some of them meant as models for multiples, and in 1962 he made serigraphs in many series, investigating non-hierarchical fields on the basis of chance-operations similar to his first kinetic objects. From 1972 onwards he used the possibilities of a chance-generator for computer-graphics, aided by the mathematician Rolf Wölk. For some years from 1968 his large kinetic wall hung in the foyer of the Gemeentemuseum Den Haag. In 1968 he participated in documenta 4 in Kassel with three large kinetic objects. In the 1970s he installed kinetic environments in Nürnberg (1969), Milan (1973) and Amsterdam (1977).

== Changing structures ==
In his work, von Graevenitz investigated and systematically visualized the phenomena of perception as determined by variable movements, light projections, space, time, chance and order. He was engaged with the optical illusion of movement (Op art) as well as real movement, using invisible motors and mechanics. He aimed to show a changing structure of geometrical elements with their unforeseeable movement, open for indeterminable constellations, - mostly on a contrasting ground. He intended for the eye to engage in game playing. In the late 1960s, non-hierarchical fields of the same elements gave way to fewer and larger elements, which were more complex in their movement. E.g. he created one concave elliptical element which moved completely alone on its ground. In opposition to the representatives of the first constructive movement (Piet Mondriaan, Max Bill) von Graevenitz did not believe in a Modernist utopian value of his art, but took it to be a special model for thoughts about how networks of relationships work in general.

== Personal life ==
He was married to art historian Antje von Graevenitz, with whom he had two children.

== Catalogue-raisonné ==
- Gerhard von Graevenitz. Exhib.cat. Kröller-Müller Museum, Otterlo 1984.
- Berswordt-Walrabe, Kornelia von: Gerhard von Graevenitz. Eine Kunst jenseits des Bildes. Staatliches Museum Schwerin, Von der Heydt Museum Wuppertal. Ostfildern-Ruit 1994. ISBN 3-89322-680-X

== Participation in a film ==
- Kristl, Vlado: Obrigkeitsfilm. 1971

== Participation on TV ==
- De tweede natuur. NOS (Vreemde gasten nr. 5) 13.2.1983

== Further literature and catalogues (a selection) ==
- The Responsive Eye. Exhib.Cat. Museum of Modern Art, New York 1965 ISBN 0289369657/0-289-36965-7
- Rickey, George: Constructivism : Origins and Evolution. New York 1967
- documenta 4, internationale Ausstellung. Exhib.cat. Vol 2 (Graphik und Objekte); Kassel 1968
- Brett, Guy: Kinetic Art. London 1968
- Colombo, Morellet, von Graevenitz. Tre Environments. Exhib.cat. Studio Marconi, Milan 1973
- Gerhard von Graevenitz. Exhib. cat. Kunsthalle Kiel, Kiel 1975
- Gerhard von Graevenitz. Exhib. cat. Stedelijk van Abbe-Museum Eindhoven 1979
- Honisch, Dieter (Ed.): Kunst in der Bundesrepublik Deutschland 1945–1985. Kunst in der Bundesrepublik Deutschland 1945–1985. Exhib.cat. Nationalgalerie, Staatliche Museen Preußischer Kulturbesitz, Berlin 1985 ISBN 3-875841-58-1
- Bewegliche Teile – Formen des Kinetischen. Exhib.cat. Johanneum Graz, Museum Tinguely Basel 2005 ISBN 978-3-88375-851-0
- Light art from Artificial Light: Light as a Medium in 20th and 21st Century Art = Lichtkunst aus Kunstlicht: Licht als Medium der Kunst im 20. und 21. Jahrhundert, ZKM, Karlsruhe, 2005, ISBN 9783775717748
- Rhythmus 21. Positionen desAbstracten. Exhib.cat. Galerie im Lenbachhaus, München 2006
- Die Neuen Tendenzen. Exhib.cat. Museum für Konkrete Kunst. Ingolstadt 2006 ISBN 3-89904-249-2
- Light and Shadow. Ed. By Galerie M. von Bartha, Basel 2006
- Zero Internationale Künstler-Avantgarde der 50er/60er Jahre. Exhib.cat. Museum Kunstpalast, Düsseldorf, Ostfildern 2006 ISBN 978-3-7757-1747-2
- Op Art. Exhib.cat. Schirn Kunsthalle Frankfurt 2007 ISBN 3865602061 ISBN 978-3865602060
- Lenz, Anna: Epoche Zero. Sammlung Lenz-Schönberg. Leben in Kunst. Ostfildern 2009 ISBN 9783775716888
- Gerhard von Graevenitz, François Morellet. Text by Serge Lemoine. Exhib.cat. Sperone Westwater Gallery, New York, in collaborator with The Mayor Gallery, London 2012

== See also ==
- Kinetic art
- Op-art
- Constructivism
- Concrete art
- Light art
- Zero
