= Stanley Brouwn =

Dutch artist (1935–2017)

- Stanley Brouwn
- Born: 25 June 1935; Paramaribo, Suriname, Republic of Suriname
- Died: 18 May 2017 (aged 81); Amsterdam, Netherlands
- Known for: Art (conceptual and installation)
- Works: this way brouwn; Afghanistan-Zambia; BROUWNTOYS 4000AD
- Movement: Zero, Conceptual Art

Stanley Edmund Brouwn (25 June 1935 – 18 May 2017) was a Suriname-born Dutch conceptual artist. His works explored dematerialization. He exemplified 1960s conceptualism. His best-known works include this way brouwn, Afghanistan-Zambia, and BROUWNTOYS 4000AD.

== Life ==
=== Early life ===
Brouwn was born in 1935 at Paramaribo in Suriname. In 1957, he travelled by boat to Amsterdam, and lived there until his death in 2017. While there, Armando, an artist and friend of Brouwn, introduced him to the Zero movement. Brouwn taught as a professor at the University of Fine Arts of Hamburg for multiple years. Brouwn eschewed giving biographical data.

=== Death ===
Brouwn died on 18 May 2017 in Amsterdam.

== Career ==
=== Works of the 1960s ===
In the early 1960s, Brouwn produced his first works. These consisted of iron and wooden sculpture. He also used suspended polythene bags filled with garbage. Few of these early works have survived, as Brouwn destroyed most of them.

Eventually, Brouwn began to consider the role of the audience in the development of artwork. One of his early works involved the dispersion of paper sheets across Amsterdam streets. The art that appeared upon the sheets resulted from the footprints of pedestrians and tire prints from cyclists.

this way brouwn (1961) and this way brouwn (1962) at the Art Institute of Chicago in 2023

Brouwn produced his most well-known work in 1961, this way brouwn. It was both a conceptual and performance art piece that consisted of Brouwn asking passers-by for directions, recording their responses on tape or encouraging them to draw their directions. Such drawings were stamped with text that read ‘THIS WAY BROUWN’. this way brouwn was performed on several other occasions in the early 1960s.

In the 1960s, conceptual art, as well as the Zero movement within the Netherlands was widespread. Brouwn, as a conceptual artist of the movement, had chosen distance and size as his artistic medium:

"More and more people make long flights once or twice a year. The validity of the concept of distance is constantly being eroded. Distances are reloaded in my work, they get meaning again."

Similarly, in a rare interview in 1964, Brouwn stated:

"It is the search for the awareness we have of wide space and the discovery of the city before we discover space. With these events, I am trying to make something of what is going on to have an effect on the spectators in terms of an action".

In 1964, at the Patio Gallery in Neu-Isenberg, an 'art-happening' occurred. Brouwn was seated upon a chair, placed atop a pedestal in the corner of the gallery with a polythene bag over his head. That same year, at the opening of the René Block Gallery, Brouwn asked guests directions through the streets of Berlin through a walkie-talkie.

=== Works of the 1970s ===
During the 1970s, Brouwn produced works exploring units of measurement. Brouwn developed units of measurement based on the length of his various body parts. He developed the ‘Stanley Brouwn foot’, which was the length of his foot. It measured approximately 26 cm. One of his works, Afghanistan-Zambia, is a typewritten register of the number of steps Brouwn completed in various cities across the world, and a physical example of his concerns surrounding measurement and distance.

In 1972, Brouwn exhibited grey filing cabinets at the Documenta 5 in Kassel. Each cabinet consisted of varied numbers of white cards. One of these cabinets held 1000 cards, an outline of a 3000-step walk and the length of the strides between 840 and 890 millimetres.

Brouwn also explored the concept of deformation. In 1974, he drew lines constructing borders upon three sheets of paper. Each of these lines denoted the length of a step. If these sheets were hung together, a movement in a single direction could be observed.

=== Later works and exhibitions ===
Brouwn's works gained fame and earned him positions in a variety of prestigious exhibitions. During his lifetime, his works were included in Documentas 5, 6, 7, and 11, at the Venice Biennale of 1982 (where he represented the Netherlands), and in a 2005 retrospective exhibition at the Van Abbe Museum.

Another dominant trait of Brouwn's conceptualism was his absence. Brouwn refrained from attending exhibitions of his works and no bibliographical information was supplied to his audiences when viewing such exhibitions. In exhibition catalogues, the following phrase was often seen:

“At the request of the artist, no bibliographical information is provided here”.

== Critical response ==
Brouwn's works were included in various prestigious exhibitions such as Documentas 5, 6, 7 and 11, and the 1982 Venice Biennale. In 2005, a retrospective collection of Brouwn's works was exhibited in the Van Abbe Museum in Eindhoven, Netherlands. His practice and works have influenced various critics, artists and contemporary aesthetics. When discussing Brouwn's conceptualism in the 1960s, Art historian, critic, educator and author Antje von Graevenitz explained that “from 1960 up to the present, his work would indeed appear to be exemplary of the intentions and realisations of that period”. Dutch writer Oscar van den Boogard analysed the role of the audience as active participants of Brouwn's works, especially with BROUWNTOYS 4000AD., stating that Brouwn “wants the viewer to become his work" and "[t]hat is only possible by letting the viewers complete his work in their imagination, over and over again. They are forced to become space and distance, forced to experience space as if it were 4000 AD”. Belgian curator and writer Laura Herman critiqued Brouwn's manipulation of existing and creation of new units of measurement, explaining that “a sly sense of humour permeates the artist’s appropriation of bureaucratic language, which he manipulated toward his own ends."

== Legacy ==
=== Artistic and cultural influence ===
The works and practice of Brouwn are said to have shaped future conceptualist thinking and aesthetics. Laura Herman stated that Brouwn continues to inform contemporary observations and reflections of scaled perspectives. The signature absence of Brouwn and its impact upon Conceptualist style is evaluated by Modern Edition founder Mike Brennan, who stated that Brouwn is “an almost legendary figure whose practice is marked by insistence on various absences… and is famously reclusive".
