= Peter Startup =

British Sculptor

Peter Startup was a British artist who lived from 1921 to 1976. He was a painter and sculptor principally known for his sculpture in using unusual combinations of materials and found objects, with an important contribution to the new wave of post-war British sculpture and the turn to non-traditional materials and forms.

Startup also had a career as an art school lecturer, culminating as Head of Sculpture at Wimbledon School of Art in London (now part of the University of the Arts, UAL).

== Early years ==
Peter Startup was born in Fulham, London in 1921, the only child and son of William Startup, a commercial sign painter and Alice Startup, née Hearne, a professional dressmaker. Moving at the age of 7 to Shepherds Bush, he attended Addison Primary School and from 1935 to 1939 studied art at the Hammersmith School of Arts and Crafts.

When World War II broke out, with a heart condition that precluded him from military service, he served as a young air raid warden and factory worker. A diary from this time suggests that his experience of war, as for so many others, was pivotal to his development. He went on in 1943 to University of London extension courses on art history at the National Gallery and became a student in painting at the Central School of Art and Design. From 1944 to 1945, under government orders, he was evacuated to Oxford to attend the Ruskin School of Drawing: a notebook records the art history books he read in the Ashmolean Museum Library.

After the war, Startup returned to London to complete his degree at the Slade School of Fine Art, changing from painting to sculpting, becoming part of a dynamic group of post-war artists. In 1949, he studied at the Abbaye de la Cambre in Brussels under Oscar Jespers (1887–1970), a well-known Belgian sculptor influenced by Cubism and Expressionism.

Startup returned to live and work in his native London and in 1953 met Rosemary Evelyn Tubbs (1927-1988), a painter who had studied theatre design at the Central School of Art and Design. Their two children, Hetty and Jasper, were born in 1957 and 1961.

== Early career ==
The early fifties were crucial in setting Startup on a professional course, first as a painter and then as a sculptor, part of a remarkable group of young British artists working in new ways – with the figure in bronze. In 1952 he was selected to show with Roland, Browse and Delbanco on Cork Street and remained with the gallery for many years.

Startup exhibited his work in group shows at the Artists' International Association (1962), at the Institute of Contemporary Art (1963). Rayner Banham, a keen detector of emerging avant-gardes in art as well as a trenchant commentator on new technologies in architecture and design, wrote the introduction to Startup's work for the AIA show, which also featured the painter Malcolm Hughes and photographs by Raymond Moore.

== Mid career ==
The mid-to-late sixties saw Startup in the public eye when his work was included in the British pavilion for the 1964 Tredicesima Triennale di Milano, (Milan, Italy). Startup was part of a unique program curated by architect, editor, writer and artist, Theo Crosby. Included with his sculpture 'Horizontal Figure' (1962) were contributions by artists Joe Tilson and Eduardo Paolozzi; designers, Fletcher Forbes and Gill (the precursor studio to Pentagram); the photographer Roger Mayne; and the designer Natasha Kroll.

Startup's work also appeared in Living Arts, one of the most important publications about the art scene at this time. He was included in ‘British Sculpture in the 60s’, Tate Gallery 1965 and in 1966, Startup showed with Forma Viva at an International Symposium of Sculptors in Kostanjevica na Krki (in the former Yugoslavia, now Slovenia), speaking at an open-air symposium about the wood sculpture he had made for the campus.

Startup showed his sculpture with the London gallery Roland, Browse and Delbanco, and in 1965 was included in the important survey Sculpture 1960–68 by the Arts Council of Great Britain. The following year there were four more group shows, including Coventry Cathedral.

Startup's larger wood and ceramic sculptures at this time were ‘metamorphic’, including risky, bold junctures of fragments, creating a shuttered, staggered or 'moving' effect." He experimented with the jointing of sections, inviting the collector or curator to ‘re-arrange’ parts of the sculpture as an ongoing alternative configuration, a radical desire to involve the public in the decision making of the artist.

== Teaching career ==
Startup also established himself as a visiting artist and teacher of sculpture from 1959 to 1965 at Bath Academy of Art (based at Corsham Court), at Ealing, and at Guildford School of Art. In 1968, he and his family travelled to Minnesota for a semester as part of an international art college teaching exchange program as visiting sculptor at Minneapolis School of Art in the fall term. There he absorbed the rich collections in ancient Greek and Roman sculpture at the Minneapolis Institute of Art and nurtured the early careers of his graduate students.

Startup began teaching at Wimbledon School of Art in 1965, where he became the course leader in Sculpture. His students include the sculptors Robin Greenwood, George Foster, Stephen Duncan and Terence Hayes.

== Late career ==
The seventies opened with a show at West Surrey College of Art & Design, group shows at Holland Park, the London Group 1975–76 and New Work 2 at the Hayward Gallery. This last phase of his life and work saw the development of ambitious and compelling pieces in plaster and wood (with one cast in aluminium), a phase tragically shortened by his death at 54 in February 1976.

Startup ‘was fond of using pieces of discarded timber and wooden manufactured objects to create his sculptures, mixing abstraction with figurative allusions.’ (Norbert Lynton, Serpentine Gallery 1977). His interest in both classical form and the discarded remains of everyday life was visible in his work in the 1960s and 1970s, making him an early proponent of recycling in art.

== Legacy ==
Startup's contribution to the British sculpture of his time was an eye for the discarded object, the ‘discarded memory’ and its creative potential. The collection of these objects (disparate sections of wood and furniture fragments, tools, domestic utensils, architectural details, printing flongs) as a ‘bank’ of future reference and linkage has been compared to how a poet might collect a sequence of disparate images before arriving at a final meaning, stimulated by their strangeness or unheimlich. This approach is also echoed by the works of his friends and associates, such as Howard Hodgkin, Eduardo Paolozzi and George Fullard, which can be seen in so much of what has been produced by subsequent generations of artists using the materiality and processes of our world today.

Startup's many retrospective exhibitions at the Serpentine Gallery (1977), Morley Gallery (1981), New Art Centre (1987), Yorkshire Sculpture Park (1995), the Poussin Gallery (2005, 2009) and The North House Gallery (2018) continued to show the remarkable range of his work during a short career: from his early bronzes to the metamorphic sculptures in wood and ceramic totemic columns, the final series of plaster and wood of ‘echoes and reflections’. Norbert Lynton's wrote in his posthumous tribute to Startup: ‘No one has played more subtly on our lust for finding the familiar in the strange.‘ (Guardian, 1977).

Examples of his sculptures are held in private and public collections including Portsmouth Museum And Art Gallery, Wakefield City Art Gallery, Middlesbrough Institute of Modern Art, Arts Council England, Tate Britain, London and the Art Gallery Of New South Wales, Sydney. The Tate Archive, London includes an archive of his papers, publications and photographs donated by the family.
