= Raymond Moore (photographer) =

English post war photographer

Raymond Moore (1920–1987) was a post-war English art photographer.

Moore was born in Wallasey, England. After serving in the RAF during the Second World War, studied at the Royal College of Art between 1947-50. He began freelance photography in 1955, and became a lecturer at Watford College from 1956-75.

Moore's first photography exhibition was a solo show held at University of Westminster's School of Architecture in 1959. In 1962 Moore's photographs were part of an Artists' International Association show, alongside Malcolm Hughes and Peter Startup's work.

Visiting the U.S. in 1968, he worked with photographer Minor White. In 1970, he had a solo show in at the Art Institute of Chicago. In 1974 he became a lecturer at Trent Polytechnic, Nottingham, leaving in 1978.

From around 1976 the climate in England slowly began to change in favour of art photography; and so Moore finally saw acclaim in his own country with a major London retrospective show at the Hayward Gallery, the publication of a strong book collection of his photography, and a BBC television documentary about his work.

He was married to Mary Cooper, a fellow photographer and died in 1987 from a heart attack.

As of 2009 the Raymond Moore archives were involved in a legal dispute, making them unavailable to the public, or researchers.

== Books of photography by Moore ==
- Photographs. (Welsh Arts Council pamphlet, 1968)
- Murmurs at Every Turn: The Photographs of Raymond Moore. (Travelling Light, 1981)
- Every So Often: Photographs. (BBC, 1983) (Accompanying a BBC television film on Moore)
- 49 Prints. (British Council; 1986)
- Large portfolio published in Creative Camera International Yearbook, (Coo Press 1976)
