= Gillian Wise =

British artist (1936–2020)

- Born: 16 February 1936; Ilford, London
- Died: 11 April 2020 (aged 84); Chanteloup-les-Vignes, France
- Education: Wimbledon College of Art; Central School of Arts and Crafts
- Known for: Abstract art

Gillian Mary Wise (16 February 1936 – 11 April 2020) was an English artist devoted to the application of concepts of rationality and aesthetic order to abstract paintings and reliefs. Between 1972 and 1990 she was known as Gillian Wise Ciobotaru.

== Early life and education ==
Wise was born at Ilford in London to Arthur, a timber merchant, and Elsie, née Holden, a milliner. She studied art at the Wimbledon College of Art from 1954 to 1957 and then at the Central School of Arts and Crafts during 1959.

== Career ==
Before she graduated, Wise was already showing works with a group of Constructionist artists, exhibiting at the 1957 Young Contemporaries exhibition at the Royal British Artists gallery and in the New Vision Centre's abstract show in 1958. In 1961 she became the youngest member of the Constructionist group, centred on Victor Pasmore and including Adrian Heath, John Ernest, Anthony Hill, Kenneth Martin, and Mary Martin. In the 1960s her work became much more widely shown with exhibitions in London (at the Drian and Axiom galleries, the Institute of Contemporary Arts and the Victoria and Albert Museum), in Chicago, and at the 1965 Tokyo Biennale and the 1969 Nuremberg Biennale. In 1968, she gained a UNESCO Fellowship award to study in Prague, followed in 1969 by a British Council scholarship to study Russian constructivism in Leningrad. In Leningrad she met and married an architect, Adrian Ciobotaru. In the same year she exhibited with a group of British artists in an exhibition of systems-based abstraction in Finland, followed in 1970 by her joining many of the same artists in the newly formed Systems Group and quitting the Constructionist group. Her fellow artists in that group included Jeffrey Steele, Peter Lowe, Malcolm Hughes, Jean Spencer, Michael Kidner, John Ernest, and David Saunders. She exhibited with the group in Matrix at the Arnolfini Gallery in Bristol in 1970, and then in 1972, at the Whitechapel Gallery in the Arts Council's Systems exhibition. The Arts Council also commissioned her to curate the Constructivist section of the 1978 Hayward Annual, followed in the same year by her inclusion in the Arts Council's Constructive Context show.

Wise taught at the Chelsea College of Art and Design and Central Saint Martins School of Art between 1971 and 1974, and later spent several years teaching and studying in the US after being elected in 1981 as a Fellow of the Centre for Advanced Visual Studies at the Massachusetts Institute of Technology. She also had appointments as Visiting Artist and Visiting Scholar at Harvard University and the University of California. While in the USA she was twice nominated in the UK as a Royal Academy member, her nominees including the architects Ernő Goldfinger, Richard Rogers, and Hugh Casson, together, among others, with the artists Sandra Blow, William Scott, and Peter Blake. Her absence in the US and later Paris prevented her election but the range and status of her nominees is evidence of the high regard for the quality and integrity of her work held by many leading artists and architects. Early in the 1980s, Wise was commissioned by Chamberlin, Powell and Bon, the architects of the Barbican Centre in London, to design the large-scale mural construction, known as The Alice Walls, in the stairwell to the main cinema. This work incorporates mirrors — a feature along with glass prisms which she has used in a number of her reliefs as a way of introducing effects of light which add to the perceptual interest of the abstract. This followed several other architectural commissions, including a screen for the International Union of Architects Congress (1961), a wall screen for the Cunard liner, Queen Elizabeth II (1968), and wall reliefs for Nottingham University Hospital (1973), for the Open University (1980), and a relief panel for Unilever House in London in 1982.

== Later life and death ==
Living in France for much of her later career, Wise's exhibitions in the UK became infrequent in the 1990s, although she was shown several times in Paris during this decade and, in 1995, in Chicago. In the 2000s, her work has been included in group exhibitions in the Osborne Samuel and Poussin galleries in London, at the British Art Fair, and in two exhibitions of British abstract and systems-based art at the Southampton City Art Gallery. In 2010, her work was included along with that of Victor Pasmore, Anthony Hill, John Ernest, and Mary and Kenneth Martin in Tate Britain's year-long display, Construction England. In 2012 she visited Novosbirsk in Siberia to submit her eventually unsuccessful entry in an open international competition for a memorial to the Soviet artist and designer El Lissitzky. In 2013 she visited Brazil where her work was in a São Paulo exhibition of British and Brazilian constructive artists. Elements of this show were shown by the Dan Galleria gallery in the London 2013 Frieze event. Examples of her work are held in many public collections including the Tate, the Victoria and Albert Museum, the British Government Art Collection, the Arts Council and the Henry Moore Institute and in collections in the US, Finland and Hungary.

Wise died on 11 April 2020 of COVID-19, while living in the care home in Chanteloup-les-Vignes near Paris to which she had moved following the deterioration of her health in 2018.

== Selected exhibitions ==
- Order and Rhythm, Austin/ Desmond Fine Art, London, UK (2020)
- Winter Exhibition, Austin/ Desmond Fine Art, London, UK (2019)
- British Constructivism, Pallant House Gallery, Chichester, UK (2017)
- Aspects of Modern British Art, Austin/ Desmond Fine Art, London, UK (2016)
- Five Issues of Studio International, Raven Row, London, UK (2015)
- Liverpool Biennial: Claude Parent, Tate Liverpool, Liverpool, UK, (2014)
- A Fine Line: Concrete, Constructivist and Minimalist Art, Austin/ Desmond Fine Art, London, UK (2014)
- Construction England, Tate Britain, London, UK (2010)
- Systems 2, Polytechnic of Central London, UK (1973)
- Systems, Whitechapel Gallery, London, UK (1972)
- Four Artists Reliefs, Constructions and Drawings, Victoria and Albert Museum, London, UK (1968)
- Reliefs/ Structures, Institute of Contemporary Arts, London, UK (1963)
