= Norman Dilworth =

English artist (1931-2023)

- Born: 12 January 1931; Wigan, Lancashire
- Died: 25 January 2023; Lille, France
- Education: Slade School of Fine Art
- Occupations: Artist, Teacher
- Movement: Kinetic, Constructivist
- Spouse(s): Mary Webber (1958), Christine Cadin (1982)
- Children: 5

Norman Dilworth (1931-2023) was an English artist, born in Wigan, Lancashire. His work is systematic, constructivist and concrete. It is mainly exhibited and appreciated in continental Europe, where it is held in many national collections.

== Biography ==
Norman Dilworth was born on 12 January 1931 in Wigan, Lancashire, where he attended Wigan Art School from 1949 to 1952. From 1952 to 1956 he studied at the Slade School of Fine Art, where he won the Tonks Prize in 1955. The following year he was awarded the Drawing Prize by the Sunday Times and a French Government scholarship to study in Paris from 1956 to 1957, where he befriended Alberto Giacometti. His work at this time took the form of paintings and drawings in black and white, using geometric forms that played with the viewer's perception.

During the fifties, Dilworth was an important figure in contemporary art, exhibiting in the Young Contemporaries Exhibitions in 1953, 1954 and 1955 and the John Moores Exhibition in 1959. Dilworth's work became associated with Kinetic art and in 1966 he took part in an exhibition alongside Bridget Riley and Michael Kidner at the Herbert Art Gallery, Coventry.

Since the 1960s, Dilworth had lived in England, teaching in several colleges. In 1971 the British Arts Council awarded him first prize for his sculpture entitled Haverfordwest. Later that year he decided to move to Amsterdam after a successful solo exhibition in The Hague. By now, his work had moved from Kinetic to Constructivist art.

In 1973, Dilworth took part in 4 English Systematic Artists, the second group exhibition of the Systems Group. Although he chose not to become a member of the group, his work has a strong affinity with the group. In 1974 he won first prize for Fountain for Cardiff by the Welsh Arts Council.

In 1980, Dilworth assisted Gerhard von Graevenitz in curating the exhibition Pier+Ocean, in which Dilworth's own work was included together with other Constructionist and Systems Group artists. This "ambitious and, as it turned out, controversial" group exhibition explored the relationship between Constructivist art and Land Art, Arte Povera, Minimalism and Conceptualism.

When Dilworth moved to Lille in France from Amsterdam in 2002, the Stedelijk Museum in Amsterdam staged a farewell exhibition.

Dilworth's first retrospective in France took place between 8 July and 30 September 2007 at the Museé Matisse in Le Cateau-Cambrésis.

== Personal life ==
Before 1982, Dilworth lived in London. After 1982 he lived in Amsterdam, moving to Lille in 2002.

Dilworth was married in 1958 to Mary Webber. The marriage was dissolved in 1976. He remarried in 1982 to Christine Cadin. Dilworth died in Lille on 25 January 2023, leaving two daughters and a son from the first marriage, and two sons from the second.

== Tributes ==
The commune of Paris-Plage, which hosted the works of Dilworth, paid homage to him by laying a plaque, with the artist's signature and handprints, on the ground of the Garden of Arts.

== Solo exhibitions ==
- Redmark Gallery (London) 1968
- Galerie Nouvelles Image (The Hague) 1970
- Lucy Milton Gallery (London) 1973
- Galleria Primo Peano (with Peter Lowe) (Rome) 1975
- Art Affairs, Amsterdam (Netherlands) 1995
- Durhammer Gallery, Frankfurt (Germany) 1995
- Art Affairs, Amsterdam (Netherlands) 1997
- Magnus Aklundh Gallery, Lund (Sweden) 1998
- Contemporary art space, Demigny (France) 1998
- Artist in residence, Guernsey (Channel Islands) 1999
- Art Affairs, Amsterdam (Netherlands) 2000
- Museum Het Mondriaanhuis, Amersfoort (Netherlands) 2001
- Contemporary art space, Demigny (France) 2001
- Stedelijk Museum, Amsterdam (Netherlands) 2002
- Het Glasen Huis, Amsterdam (Netherlands) 2003
- Museum of Fine Arts and Lace, Calais (France) 2005
- Espace Lumière, Hénin-Beaumont (France) 2005
- Oniris Gallery, Rennes (France) 2006
- Bouvet Ladubay Saumur Contemporary Art Center (France) 2006
- Galerie Frontière$, Hellemmes (France) 2006
- Sculpture / Art|Paris tour at the Grand-Palais, Oniris stand 2007 and 2008
- Retrospective at the Matisse Museum / Cateau-Cambrésis 2007

== Group exhibitions ==
- 1972: 4 Artists Galerie Nouvelle Image, The Hague
- 1973: 4 English Systematic Artists, Amsterdam
- 1974: British Painting '74, Hayward, London
- 1980: Pier + Ocean: construction in the art of the seventies, Hayward, London/Kröller-Müller Museum, Otterlo.

== Art collections ==
- Villa Datris Foundation for Contemporary Sculpture, L'Isle-sur-la-Sorgue, France
- National Contemporary Art Fund, La Défense, France
- Matisse Museum, Cateau-Cambrésis, France
- Grenoble Museum, France
- Montbéliard Museum, France
- City of Valenciennes, France
- Tate Gallery, London
- The British Council, UK
- Art Council of Great Britain
- Manchester City Art Gallery, UK
- National Collection, Warsaw, Poland
- Stzuki Museum. Museum of Modern Art, Łodź, Poland
- City of Amsterdam, Holland
- City of Dordrecht, Holland

== Other sources ==
- "Norman Dilworth obituary", The Guardian, 13 February 2023 (Charles Darwent)
- Norman DILWORTH on the Galerie Oniris website which regularly exhibits the work of Norman Dilworth since 2004
