= Jean Spencer =

Jean Spencer may refer to:

- Jean Spencer (gymnast) (born 1940), New Zealand Olympic gymnast
- Jean Spencer (artist) (1942–1998), British artist

== See also ==
- Jean Spencer Ashbrook
