= Colin Jones (artist, born 1934) =

English artist and sculptor (born 1934)

- Born: 1934 (age 90–91)
- Education: Goldsmiths' College of Art
- Occupation(s): Artist, teacher
- Movement: Concrete, Systems

Colin Jones (born 1934) is an English artist and sculptor whose work has been regarded as constructive and systematic. His works have been exhibited and preserved in several public collections in England, including the Arts Council and the Tate gallery.

== Biography ==
Jones was educated at Rudolf Steiner School, where he was influenced by the colour theories of Goethe and Kandinsky. Later he attended Goldsmiths' College of Art, where he was taught by Kenneth Martin and Mary Martin. Upon graduation, Jones taught at Leicester Polytechnic.

Jones exhibited with the Systems Group and showed alongside fellow systems and constructivist artists in a series of important exhibitions during the 1960s and 1970s including the Arts Council Touring Exhibition, Construction England (1963); Unit Series Progression, Arts Council Gallery Cambridge (1967); Systems at the Whitechapel Gallery and tour (1972). At Systems, Jones exhibited a three-part relief: Rotation, Reflection, Progression Structure, developing a light modulating structure "including relief elements of tone, colour and reflected light." While the Tate gallery holds the White Rotation relief, Jones subsequently destroyed the other two: Reflection and Progression.

Jones also worked on a number of commissions, including an open-air sculpture for Leicester city centre (1970); a wall relief for Leicester University (1981–82) and a neon sculpture for Sharespace Shopping Arcade in Nottingham. His "Relief Construction: After-Images" (1983), made of aluminium and mild steel, decorates the Charles Wilson Building at the University of Leicester.

Art historian Alan Fowler discusses Colin Jones's systems work in his 2006 PhD thesis "Constructive Art in Britain 1913 – 2005". Jones is also mentioned in Alastair Grieve's 2005 book "Constructed Abstract Art in England After the Second World War: A Neglected Avant-Garde".

== Group exhibitions ==
1963	Plus Minus Inventions (with Peter Lowe), A.I.A. Gallery
	Construction: England, Arts Council
1964	Then and Now, City Art Gallery, Leeds
1967	Unit, Series, Progression, Arts Council
	Constructions, Arts Council (tour)
1968	Constructions, Greenwich Theatre Gallery, London
1970	Space Dimensions, Dutch Arts Council (tour)
	Site, outdoor exhibition, Leicester
1971	Matrix, Arnolfini Gallery, Bristol
1972	Systems, Whitechapel Gallery, London (and tour)
1973	Systems II, Polytechnic of Central London

== Works in public collections ==
- Arts Council Collection London
- Tate Britain
