= Richard Allen (abstract artist) =

English painter

Allen in the late 1960s.

Richard Allen (8 February 1933 – 9 February 1999) was a British Minimalist, Abstract, Systems, Fundamental, and Geometric painter and printmaker. Allen worked prolifically from 1960 until his death, in 1999, from motor neurone disease.

During the winter of 2016/2017 Tate Britain exhibited its Richard Allen work, Six Panel Systems Painting (1972), in a BP Spotlight display.

== 1960s Pop art, Op art and Kinetic art ==
In the early 1960s he became involved In the Op art and Kinetic art movements, exhibiting with Bridget Riley, Jeffrey Steele, Michael Kidner and Peter Sedgley. A fascination with interferometry influenced his work at this time and enabled him to develop the linear element in the collage works into a form of optical painting. This work was done using fast acid dye on canvas and an acrylic resist line for the structure of the paintings. During this period Allen was also working on a series of black and white OP paintings in PVA and oil on board and graphic Op art works.

== Early 1970s ==
In the early 1970s Allen was involved with Bridget Riley and Peter Sedgley's artist cooperative at the Match Shed in London. In 1970 his large two colour stripe acrylic Op art paintings on canvas were installed at the Match Shed in London (Images from Richard Allen's website) and he had a one-man show at Angela Flowers in 1971.

In 1971 Allen became a member of the Matrix Group, organised by Malcolm Hughes. The group were involved in the idea of a systemic form of painting, that is, a recoverable system underlying its construction. Allen's work was included in the Matrix Exhibition at the Arnolfini Gallery, Bristol in 1971. The group then evolved into the Systems group whose interests could be traced back to European Constructivism. In 1972 Allen was represented in the Arts Council's major exhibition of Systems Art, curated by Nicholas Serota, opening at the Whitechapel Gallery, London in 1972 and moving on to tour the UK.

Allen's work became increasingly Minimalist and Fundamental. He stopped using colour (apart from in his graphic and geometric work) and began a period of 20 years working primarily with charcoal and cellulose acetate on canvas. Using iconic images; the cross and the grid. Allen described his work as being:

"concerned with evolving and manifesting simple and direct images of a "concrete" nature. The process through which these images develop involves a rational approach to creativity with the use of systemic procedures where there is a relationship between the creative imagination and systems of order" Statement: Richard Allen 1976

By 1974 Allen had gained an international reputation with solo exhibitions in Italy, the Netherlands, Belgium, Switzerland, France, Japan and the USA. As well as being included in "British painting '74" at the Hayward Gallery in London, "British Painting 1952-1977" at the Royal Academy, London he was celebrated with a one-man show at The Institute of Contemporary Art (ICA, London) in 1975.

Describing his black and white Systems, and his charcoal and cellulose acid on canvas paintings/drawings of the mid 1970s art critic William Packer wrote:

"These are very straight-forward works, simple, open and direct…..A simple grid articulates the surface, disposed with perfect regularity and achieving a structure that is utterly static and simplicity and regularity of these works is thus matched by other features which introduce the romantic, the poetic and the atmospheric, elements not usually associated in our minds with Systems work." William Packer, Galleria del Cavallino exhibition review, 1974

"Richard Allen is an artist who reveals his personal world by translating a harmonic disintegration and reintegration of images and thoughts on to canvas. His use of the abstract is mature. He is totally secure in his technique and has no doubts about it." Bill Kurria – art critic 1988

== 1990s – Minimalism and "The White Paintings" ==
Despite the name the works known as "the white paintings" have colour lying beneath the white which was applied within a strict linear structure. A range of different whites i.e. Flake, Zinc, Titanium etc. were used in combinations for their various modulatory abilities of colour bias and opacity. When talking about the execution of these works Allen explained:

"The working method permits an interactive process whereby the opposing characteristics of a highly regulated structural format and a less predictable human physical element can creatively coexist."

The white paintings were shown in the retrospective exhibition of his work at The University of Wales School of Art Gallery, Aberystwyth in 1998 and at a one-man show at Flowers East in 1999.

== Graphic work and Geometric abstraction ==
Allen was also a talented printmaker. He consistently made graphics alongside his painting and drawing. These works included Silk Screen Op art graphics back in the 60s, the "Iconocross" series of black cross derived prints, brightly coloured silk screens and Geometric abstraction, and a small edition of "White Painting" Lithographs.
