= Antje von Graevenitz =

German art historian, art critic, educator and author

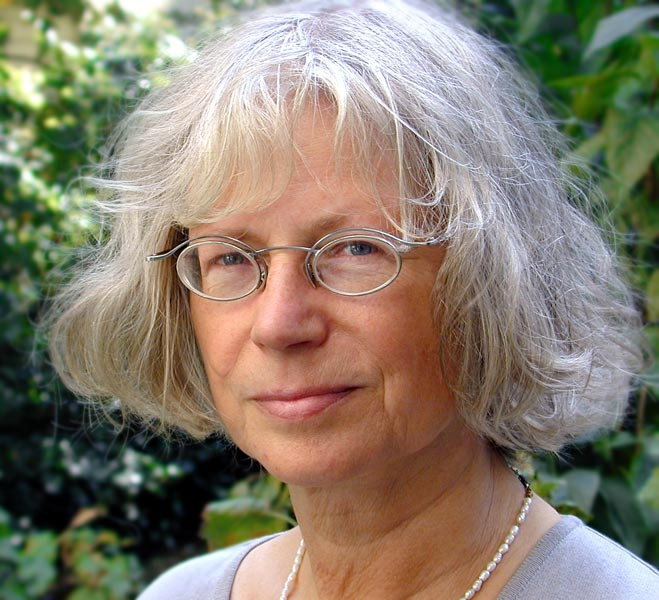
- Born: 26 August 1940 (age 85); Hamburg, Germany
- Education: PhD (1973)
- Known for: General art history, history of 20th- and 21st-century art
- Spouse: Martin Adrichem

Antje (-Maria) von Graevenitz, born Ludwig (26 August 1940, Hamburg) is a German art historian, art critic, educator and author.

== Education and career ==
Since 1970, Antje von Graevenitz has lived in Amsterdam. As a professor of general art history, specialized in the history of 20th- and 21st-century art, she taught at the University of Amsterdam (as a lecturer 1977–1989) and Cologne (as a professor 1989-2005). In her research she is mainly focused on ephemeral art (performances and Fluxus) and interdisciplinary and anthropological topics (art in relation to rites of passage, philosophy, music, theatre or dance). Some of her publications are dedicated to Marcel Duchamp, Joseph Beuys and Nam June Paik. Parallel to studying librarianship (diploma in 1964), she read art history, archeology and ethnology at Hamburg and Munich, where in 1973 she obtained her PhD with a dissertation about the Dutch ornament in the lobate-style (‚kwab’) of the baroque period, investigated with reference to the works of the family of silversmiths van Vianen and Lutma.

From 1971 onwards, she began writing art reviews and essays for the Süddeutsche Zeitung as well as for international journals. She has worked as part of the editorial teams of Museumjournaal, Vrij Nederland, Kunstschrift OKB, Wonen TABK, Archis and the Wallraf-Richartz Jahrbuch. She went on to lecture in modern art history at the University of Amsterdam (1977–1989), and was visiting professor at the Rijksuniversity Groningen and the Academy in Hamburg. Subsequently she occupied the chair of general art history and 20th- and 21st-century art history at the University of Cologne (1989–2005). As cultural advisor she worked for both the Dutch government and for the municipality of Amsterdam. Furthermore, she functioned as a member of the board for Stichting de Appel in Amsterdam, for the Academy of Art in Arnhem, for Stichting Stamina in Amsterdam, as chairwoman of the board of the Art Collection of Groningen and as the president of the Dutch section of the AICA. She also was engaged as scientific advisor of the Rijksakademie in Amsterdam, the Institute of Modern Art in Nürnberg, the Kunstmuseum Liechtenstein in Vaduz and in the Central Archive of the International Art Market (ZADIK) in Cologne. In 1993, she was a member of the selection committee for the chief curator of documenta X in Kassel.

== Personal life ==
Antje von Graevenitz was married (1967–1983) to the late Gerhard von Graevenitz (with two children), who was an artist of kinetic objects. Since 2001 she has been married to Martin Adrichem.

== Works (selection) ==
Rituals

- Das Niederländische Ohrmuschelornament. Phänomen und Entwicklung, dargestellt an den Werken und Entwürfen der Goldschmiedefamilien van Vianen und Lutma. (PhD Munich 1971) Bamberg 1973.
- Alchemistische Verheissungen in der Arte Povera. In: Che fare? Arte Povera – die historischen Jahre. Ed. by Friedemann Malsch, Christiane Meyer-Stoll, Valentina Pero. Exhib.cat. Kunstmuseum Liechtenstein. 2009 pp. 29–41
- A Labyrinth by Joan Miró. In: Joan Miro. Snail Woman Flower Star. Ed. by Stephan von Wiese and Sylvia Martin. Munich Berlin London New York 2008 pp. 106–119
- Der tatsächliche Tod des Subjekts in der Inszenierung eines Kunstwerks als Herausforderung an das wahrnehmende Subjekt. In: Geyer, Paul, Monika Schmitz-Emans (Ed.s): Proteus im Spiegel. Kritische Theorie des Subjekts im 20. Jahrhundert. Würzburg 2003, pp. 571–582.
- Rites of Passage in Modern Art. In: Lavin, Irving (Ed.): World Art. Themes of Unity and Diversity. Acts of the XXVIth International Congress of the History of Art, Washington D.C. 1986, The Pennsylvania State University 1989, Vol. III, pp. 585–592.
- Brancusis Passage und Tempel. In: Zeichen des Glaubens – Geist der Avantgarde. Religiöse Tendenzen in der Kunst des 20. Jahrhunderts. Ed. by Wieland Schmied. Exhib.cat. Schloß Charlottenburg Berlin 1980, pp. 211–218.
- Hütten und Tempel: zur Mission der Selbstbesinnung. In: Monte Verità. Berg der Wahrheit. Lokale Anthropologie als Beitrag zur Wiederentdeckung einer neuzeitlichen sakralen Topographie. Ed. by Harald Szeemann and Ingeborg Lüscher. Kunsthaus Zürich 1978/79, pp. 85–98.

Philosophy

- Die “Geworfenheit des Menschen”. Zur Frage des Existentialismus für deutsche Künstler nach 1945. in : Schieder, Martin. Isabelle Ewig (Ed.s): In die Freiheit geworfen. Positionen zur Deutsch-Französischen Kunstgeschichte nach 1945 . Mit einem Vorwort von Thomas Gaethgens. Berlin 2006 pp. 229–254 (Passagen/Passages Bd 13)

FLUXUS

- Sprache ergreift Materie – das FESTUM FLUXORUM FLUXUS in Düsseldorf 1963. In: Buschmann, Renate, Stephan von Wiese (Ed.s): Fotos schreiben Kunstgeschichte. AFORK. Archiv künstlerischer Fotografie der rheinischen Kunstszene. Köln 2007 pp. 67–86
- „My Faust“ von Nam June Paik – ein banalisierter Mythos? In: Gaehtgens, Thomas W. (Ed.): Künstlerischer Austausch. Artistic Exchange. Akten des XXVIII. Internationalen Kongresses für Kunstgeschichte, Berlin, 15.-20. Juli 1992, Band III, Berlin 1993. pp. 223–233.

Joseph Beuys

- Im Namen der Freiheit – und des Mitleids. F.W.Schelling als Inspirationsquelle für Beuys. in: Müller, Ulrich (Ed.): Joseph Beuys. Parallelprozesse, Archäologie einer künstlerischen Plastik. München 2012 pp. 68–81
- Beuys’ letzte Leitern Scala Libera und Scala Napolitana (1985). In: Vöhler, Martin, Dirck Linck (Ed.s): Grenzen der Katharsis in den modernen Künsten. Transformationen des aristotelischen Modells seit Barnays, Nietzsche und Freud. Berlin, New York 2009 S. 255-292
- „Ein bisschen Dampf machen“. Ein alchemistisches Credo von Joseph Beuys. In: Schneede, Uwe M. (Ed.): Ausstieg aus dem Bild. Hamburg 1996 (Im Blickfeld 1997), pp. 43–60.
- Breaking the Silence: Joseph Beuys on his ‘Challenger” Marcel Duchamp (1995). In: Mesch, Claudia and Viola Mihely (Ed.s): Joseph Beuys. The Reader. With a foreword of Arthur C. Danto. Transl. By Claudia Mesch a.o, Cambridge, Mass. 2007 pp.. 29-49
- Der „Eurasienstab“ von Joseph Beuys / “Eurasienstab“ de Joseph Beuys / De „Eurasienstab“ van Joseph Beuys. In: Decker, Anny de (Ed.): Joseph Beuys. Eurasienstab. (Note: de Decker, Joseph and Anny (1987). Joseph Beuys: Eurasienstab. Antwerp: Galerie Anny de Decker. pp. 57–62. ISBN 978-9068480047.) Antwerpen 1987, pp. 57–62.
- Erlösungskunst oder Befreiungspolitik: Wagner und Beuys. In: Förg, Gabriele (Ed.): Unsere Wagner: Joseph Beuys, Heiner Müller, Karlheinz Stockhausen. Hans Jürgen Syberberg. Frankfurt a. M. 1984, pp. 11–49.

Marcel Duchamp

- Duchamp as a Scientist, Artifex and Semiotic Philosopher, His Notes of the „Infra-Mince“ (1934/35-1945). In: Banz, Stefan (Ed.): Duchamp and the Forestay Waterfall. Symposium, Concert, Interventions, Exhibitions. (Note: Banz, Stefan (2010). Marcel Duchamp and the Forestay waterfall : symposium, concert, intervention, exhibitions. Zurich. pp. 216–231. ISBN 9783037641569.) Salle Davel, Kunsthalle Marcel Duchamp, Galerie Davel 14, The Forestay Waterfall. (010). Zürich 2010 pp. 216–231
- Duchamps Tür «Gradiva». Eine literarische Figur und ihr Surrealistenkreis. In: Graevenitz, Antje von, Klaus Beekman (Ed.s): Marcel Duchamp. (Avant Garde 2) , Amsterdam /Atlanta 1989. pp. 63–96.

General subjects

- 'The Third Mind' of William S. Burroughs and Brion Gysin. In: Bowles/Beats/Tangier. Performing Tangier 2008. Ed. by Allen Hibbard & Barry Tharaud. Tangier/Morocco 2008 S. 139-146 (Series Conferences and Colloquia No. 5)
- erdloch, erdraum und bodenplatte. konkurrenz von zeugen- und kunstwissenschaft im blick auf die amerikanische kunst der sechziger jahre in münchen. In: Krieger, Verena (Ed.): kunstgeschichte & gegenwartskunst. Vom nutzen & nachteil der zeitgenossenschaft. Köln Weimar Wien 2008 pp. 117–142
- Mit angezogener Bremse? Bildende Kunst in Deutschland nach 1945 im Maschinenzeitalter. In: Breuer, Gerda (Ed.): Die Zähmung der Avantgarde. Zur Rezeption der Moderne in den 50er Jahren. Basel / Frankfurt a. M. 1997, pp. 129–146.
- Warhols Tausch der Identitäten. In: Groblewski, Michael, Oskar Bätschmann (Ed.s): Kultfigur und Mythenbildung. Das Bild vom Künstler und sein Werk in der zeitgnössischen Kunst. Berlin 1993, pp. 69–91.
- Oskar Schlemmers Kursus: Der Mensch. In: Oskar Schlemmer; Wand-Bild, Bild-Wand. Exhib.cat. Städtische Kunsthalle Mannheim 1988, pp. 9–16
- Jan J. Schoonhoven – der Zeichner. In: J.J. Schoonhoven – Zeichnungen – tekeningen 1940-1975. Exhib.cat. Städtische Kunsthalle Düsseldorf / Museum Boymans-van Beuningen Rotterdam 1975/76. pp. 3–19.

Film

- Öffentlichkeitsarbeit an niederländischen Museen. Saarländischer Rundfunk, 1974, Coll. Rijksdienst voor Beeldende Kunst, Den Haag.

Exhibitions curated

- Mooi alleen hoeft niet. With Gijs van Tuyl and Franck Gribling. Nederlandse Kunststichting 1974
- PersonalWorlds. With Gijs van Tuyl and Franck Gribling, Nederlandse Kunststichting, 1978
- De eerste plastic eeuw. With Marian Boot and Henk Overduin, Haags Gemeente Museum 1979.
- Gerhard von Graevenitz, Retrospective. Rijksmuseum Kröller-Müller, Otterlo 1984, Wilhelm Hack Museum, Ludwigshaven a.Rh., 1984, Kunsthalle Bremen, 1984/85, Quadrat-Museum/ Josef Albers, Bottrop 1985.
- Das szenische Auge. With Wolfgang Storch, IFA Stuttgart 1996.
