= Antonio Asis =

Argentine painter (1932–2019)

Antonio Asis (1932–2019) was an Argentine painter, an exponent of Op Art. His works were presented at the Paris Biennale (1967) and in Casa de Cultura de Grenoble (1968).

== Biography ==
From 1946 to 1950 he attended the Escuela National de Belles Artes in Buenos Aires, Argentina. In 1956 he arrived in Paris and immediately befriended the Denise Rene group of artists such as Jesus Rafael Soto, Pol Bury, and Yaacov Agam. Asis was one of the first Argentines to arrive in Paris, and started working in his typical style of 'interference' works like the Interferences concentriques paintings and his Vibrations sculptures with a metal grille.

There is a strong group of Argentinian artists (Antonio Asis, Julio Le Parc, Luis Tomasello, Horacio Garcia-Rossi) as well as a strong group of Venezuelan artists (Jesús Rafael Soto, Carlos Cruz-Diez, Dario Perez-Flores, Narciso Debourg) working with the possibilities of vision, movement, and light. He works and lives in Paris.
