= David Saunders (artist) =

English artist

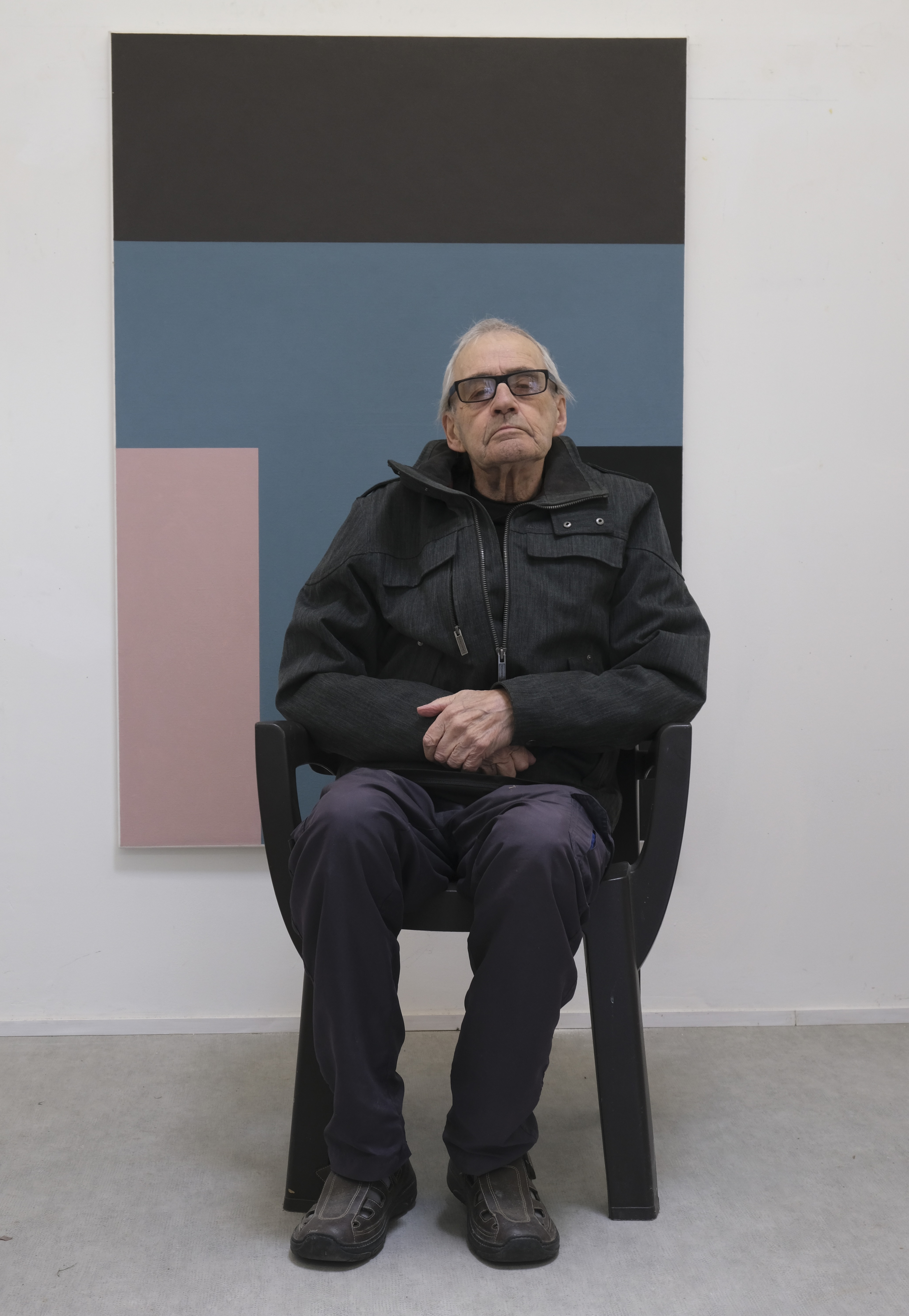
- Saunders in 2023
- Born: 1936 (age 89–90); Southend-on-Sea, Essex, England
- Education: St Martin's School of Art, Royal Academy Schools
- Occupations: Artist; Teacher
- Movement: Systematic, Constructive

David Saunders (born 1936) is an English artist, teacher and musician. Over his long career Saunders's work has undergone some changes but is best known for his systematic and constructivist style which he practised from the late 1960s to the mid 1990s. He is mainly exhibited and appreciated in the UK and Europe, where his work is held in many national collections.

== Early life and education ==
Saunders was born in 1936 in Southend-on-Sea, Essex. Although he left school at 15 without formal qualifications he briefly attended A.S Neill's Summerhill School where his interest in art was nurtured. After leaving school he took evening classes in Graphic Design at Manchester School of Art and quickly found employment in an advertising agency. After one year he moved to London where he found a post in a prestigious agency in Mayfair. While working there he took evening classes in drawing held by Vivian Pitchforth at St Martin's School of Art.

He was conscripted into the army and stationed on Salisbury Plain, where he enjoyed painting while not on active service. After being discharged, he returned to St Martin's to study painting full time under Frederick Gore, after which he was accepted into the Royal Academy Schools, studying under the distinguished portrait painter Peter Greenham from 1959 to 1962, and where he gained a Master's degree.

== Career ==
After completing his studies, Saunders was appointed to a teaching post at Newport College of Art in 1965, where he first met the painter Jeffrey Steele. In 1967 Saunders started producing "Systematic-Constructive" work. In 1968, Saunders became visiting lecturer at the Portsmouth Polytechnic Art School, appointed by Steele, who was Head of Faculty and who ran the faculty in a similar, non-hierarchical manner to Black Mountain College in North Carolina. Saunders also worked at the nearby Winchester School of Art, where he became the personal tutor to Brian Eno. This was a time of "classical experimental music", inspired by the works of John Cage and Cornelius Cardew. It was around this time that Saunders works were influenced by determinate and indeterminate factors.

In 1968, at the Arts Council of Great Britain Thirtieth Open Exhibition for Painting and Sculpture in Cardiff, Saunders and Steele won the Purchase Prize. This event began a long collaboration between both artists and, one year later, Saunders was one of the founding members of the Systems Group, following a 1969 exhibition in Helsinki.

In 1970, Saunders became artist-in-residence at Sussex University, during which he started to play tenor horn with the Portsmouth Sinfonia. In 1972, Saunders became artist-in-residence at Stedelijk Museum Amsterdam, where he studied the works of Piet Mondrian.

Between 1970 and 1980 Saunders was a visiting lecturer at the Slade School of Fine Art, London University, which he combined with teaching painting, photography and playing music at Liverpool Polytechnic Art School

In the late 1970s, he started looking into colour functions, and in 1986 he co-initiated (with Richard Bell and Nicole Charlett) the touring exhibition Colour Presentations for 6 Artists, with support from the Arts Council of Wales.

In 1989 he also co-initiated (with Richard Bell and Nicole Charlett) the exhibition Complexions which opened at Galerie L'Idee, Zoetermeer, Holland and toured to Dean Clough Contemporary Art Gallery, Halifax with support from the British Council. Saunders was a member of the 56 Group in Wales.

In 1988, aged 52, Saunders stepped away from formal teaching.

In 2013, Saunders and British artist Justin Jones established The Mercus Barn space based in the Ariège, Pyrénées. The Eye and Mind project (2014-2018) was directed by David Saunders in collaboration with selected artists, writers, musicians, and gallerists.

David Saunders maintains his interest in experimental art, and continues to exhibit new works around Europe and Britain.

Art historian Alan Fowler discusses David Saunders' earlier work in his 2006 PhD thesis "Constructive Art in Britain 1913 - 2005". Saunders is also mentioned in Alastair Grieve's 2005 book "Constructed Abstract Art in England After the Second World War: A Neglected Avant-Garde".

== Music ==
Saunders was one of the very few visual artists interested in experimental music. He learnt to read music and play the trombone and tenor horn with the Liverpool "grouplet" of the Portsmouth Sinfonia. Both Saunders and Steele played tenor horn and trombone respectively, on the Portsmouth Sinfonia's first LP, "Portsmouth Sinfonia Plays the Popular Classics", released in 1973 by Columbia Records.

In 1973, Saunders was invited by Clive Langer - of Deaf School fame - to play tenor horn in his band.

Saunders has also been associated with the Ross and Cromarty Orchestra.

== Personal life ==
In 1985, Saunders lived in Clwyd, North Wales, returning to London in 1994. In 2006 he moved to Foix, in the French Pyrenees, where he is currently resident.

== Selected exhibitions ==
=== Solo ===
- 1965: First solo exhibition at the Artists' International Association gallery, London
- 1967: Bristol Arts Centre
- 1969: Greenwich Theatre Art Gallery, London
- 1970: Gardner Centre Gallery, University of Sussex, Brighton
- 1974: Lucy Milton Gallery, London
- 1974: Bluecoats Gallery, Liverpool
- 1979: Sally East Gallery, London
- 1980: Liverpool Academy
- 1983: South Square Gallery, Thornton
- 1995: Janus Avivson Gallery, London
- 2002: SEVEN SEVEN Gallery, London
- 2002: Dean Clough Gallery, Halifax,
- 2016: La Galerie, Lycée Gabriel Fauré, Foix

=== Group ===
- 1959: Young Contemporaries, RBA Galleries, London
- 1960: Tomorrow's Artists, Grabowski Gallery, London
- 1966: Undefined Situation, Howard Roberts Gallery, Cardiff
- 1967: Survey 67, Camden Arts Centre, London
- 1968: Wales Now, Welsh Arts Council,
- 1969: Systeemi•System, Amos Anderson Museum, Helsinki
- 1971: Matrix, Arnolfini Gallery, Bristol
- 1972: Systems, a touring exhibition organised by the Arts Council and Whitechapel Art Gallery
- 1983: Four British Constructivists, Engstrom Gallery, Stockholm
- 1986: Colour Presentations, Gardner Centre Gallery, University of Sussex/Stoke-on-Trent City Museum/Spacex Gallery, Exeter/Swiss Cottage Library Gallery, London
- 1986: Colour Constructions, Exhibiting Space, London
- 1986: Systematic and Constructivist Drawings, Wentworth Gallery, University of York
- 1994: Mostyn Open Exhibition 5, Oriel Mostyn, Mostyn, Wales
- 2000: Eyes and Ears and Ears and Eyes, The Nunnery, London
- 2002: Serious Pleasure, Cento Modigliani, Florence
- 2002: Complexions, Dean Clough Galleries, Halifax
- 2008: A Rational Aesthetic Southampton City Art Gallery, UK,
- 2017: Systems 1972, Tate Britain
- 2018: Transforming Surfaces, Arthouse1 Gallery, London

== Works in public collections ==
Prints:

- British Museum, London
- Kunstmuseum Den Haag, The Hague
- Museum of Modern Art, New York City
- Rijksmuseum Meermano, The Hague
- Stanford University, California
- Victoria and Albert Museum, London

Paintings:

- The Clwyd Fine Arts Trust, Wales
- National Library of Wales
- National Museum of Wales, Cardiff
- New York Public Library
- Sainsbury Centre for Visual Arts, Norwich
- The South Bank Collection, London
- Southampton City Art Gallery
- Stadtmuseum und Kunstsammlung, Jena
- Tate Gallery, London
