= Gerda Breuer =

German art historian (born 1948)

Gerda Breuer (born 1948, in Aachen) is a German art historian, best known for her numerous publications on the subjects of art history, design history, and landscape painting. From 1995 to 2014, she was professor of art history at the University of Wuppertal, having previously served as director of the Textilfabrik Cromford from 1985 to 1990, and chairwoman of the Bauhaus Dessau Foundation from 2005 to 2012.
