= Jean Spencer (artist) =

British artist

Jean Mary Spencer
- Born: 22 April 1942; Frimley, England
- Died: 4 January 1998 (aged 55); London, England
- Education: Bath Academy of Art; University of Sussex
- Known for: Abstract painting & sculpture
- Spouse(s): Malcolm Hughes, m.1997 – 1997, his death.

Jean Mary Spencer (22 April 1942 – 4 January 1998) was a British artist known for her abstract paintings and relief sculptures.

== Biography ==
Spencer was born in Frimley in Surrey and studied teacher training at the Bath Academy of Art from 1960 to 1963. While still a student at Bath she created her first abstract reliefs, having been introduced to systematic constructivism by her tutors John Ernest and Malcolm Hughes. For a time, Spencer taught at the Loughborough College of Art before moving to the Bulmershe College of Higher Education in Reading where she was a staff member for twenty years until 1988 when she joined the faculty of the Slade School of Fine Art in central London, where she remained for ten years in different posts.

As an artist, Spencer had her first solo exhibition at the Bear Lane Gallery in Oxford in 1965 and a second exhibition, at the University of Sussex, followed in 1969. During the 1960s, Spencer often produced cubes in relief form, with proportions based on a mixture of mathematical rules and her own intuition. Later in life she focussed on painting and the use of bold blocks of colour. In 1967 Spencer was a prize winner at the annual John Moores exhibition in Liverpool. Spencer exhibited with a group of British artists concerned with systems-based abstraction, the Systems Group, that included Jeffrey Steele, Peter Lowe, Michael Kidner as well as Malcolm Hughes. Her work was shown widely in Europe between 1969 and 1973 as part of various Systems Group exhibitions. In Britain, her work was included in the 1972 Arts Council touring exhibition of Systems Group artworks. During 1977 and 1978, Spencer produced a series of publications, Working Information, featuring drawings and designs by Systems Group and other Systematic-Constructive artists. She then spent a year at the University of Sussex studying the History and Theory of Art for her M.A. Spencer was an active member of the group behind the Exhibiting Space series of multi-disciplinary collaborations held in Whitechapel in 1983 and was included in the 1986 exhibition Colour Presentations at the Gardner Centre Gallery at the University of Sussex, which then toured Britain.

Spencer lived in London and for twenty-five years was the partner of her former Bath tutor and Systems Group artist, Malcolm Hughes, whom she married in 1997, shortly before he died. They worked on a number of projects together including a 1990s exhibition and symposium, Testing the System held at Kettle's Yard in Cambridge, where, subsequently, Spencer was an artist-fellow at Churchill College. The Tate held a joint memorial exhibition for Spencer and Hughes in 1999. Works by Spencer, both paintings and sculptures, are held in several public collections, most notably at the Tate, in the collections of the Arts Council, Reading Museum and of the University of Warwick.
