= Nouvelle tendance =

Artistic movement founded in Yugoslavia

Nouvelle Tendance (New Tendency) was an art movement founded in Yugoslavia in 1961. The "theoretician" of the group was Croatian art critic Matko Meštrović. The other original founders of Nouvelle Tendance were Brazilian painter Almir Mavignier, and Božo Bek, the Croatian director of the Museum of Contemporary Art, Zagreb.

== Overview ==
The Nouvelle Tendance was more accurately a reflection of common approaches used by artists in a variety of simultaneous movements worldwide, such as Concrete art, kinetic art, and Op Art. The main consideration of the movement has been described as the "problem of movement as conveyed through repetition". The "sensation of displeasure" is provoked in some Nouvelle Tendance works, to "stimulate a more active field of vision" and interest the spectator in an "auto-creative process".

Distinct self-identified groups of artists who became associated with Nouvelle Tendance included GRAV, Gruppo T, Gruppo N, and Zero. The movement attracted artists from France, Germany, Italy, the Netherlands, and Spain. International artists participated in a series of exhibits at European galleries.

This group should not be confused with an early 20th century circle of Paris-based artists who operated briefly under the name "Tendances nouvelles" and held an exhibition in 1904; founding members included Alice Dannenberg and Martha Stettler.

== See also ==
- Kinetic art
- Op art
- Concrete art
- Sound art
- Sound installation
