= Malcolm Hughes =

British artist

- Born: 22 July 1920; Manchester, England
- Died: 19 September 1997 (aged 77); London, England
- Education: Regional College of Art, Manchester; Royal College of Art
- Known for: Painting
- Movement: Abstract constructivism
- Spouses: Joan Barkworth, m.1947-dissolved; Jean Spencer m.1997

Malcolm Hughes (22 July 1920 – 19 September 1997) was a British constructive artist.

== Biography ==
Hughes was born in Manchester and during the Second World War, he was a radio operator in the Royal Navy. After the war he became influenced by British abstract artists of the period whilst training at the Regional College of Art in Manchester and then later at the Royal College of Art in London. Whilst he was a student in London his work was in the socialist realism style and he was involved in painting a large mural at the Royal Courts of Justice. By the 1960s he had developed his own form of constructivism and his work was exhibited at the Institute of Contemporary Arts in London and the Salon des Réalités Nouvelles in Paris.

He taught at a number of institutions during his life. During the 1960s he taught part-time at the architecture department of the Polytechnic of Central London, Bath Academy of Art and Chelsea School of Art, where he taught alongside two other constructive artists, John Ernest and Anthony Hill. At Corsham he shared for some time a teaching studio with painter Gillian Ayres. In 1970 he began to teach part-time at the Slade School of Art and in 1973 began to run the graduate programme there.

His works are in a number of collections, including at the Tate, Warwick University, Manchester City Art Gallery, Sussex University and the British Council.

In 2008, his work featured in an exhibition at Southampton City Art Gallery alongside other constructive artists, including Peter Lowe and Mary Martin.
