= Michael Kidner =

British artist

Michael James Kidner
- Michael Kidner in 1962
- Born: 11 September 1917
- Died: 29 November 2009 (aged 92)
- Education: University of Cambridge, Goldsmiths University
- Known for: Painting, printing, sculpture, drawing
- Movement: Op art, systems art, Constructivism
- Spouse: Marion Frederick

Michael James Kidner RA (11 September 1917 – 2009) was a British op artist. Active from mid-1960s, Kidner was an early exponent of the genre. Through his interest in mathematics, he was part of the Constructivism movement and chaos and wave theories influence his work.

== Early life ==
Kidner was born in Kettering, the son of an industrialist and was one of six children. He was educated at Bedales School, and from 1939 read History and Anthropology at Cambridge before studying Landscape Architecture at Ohio State University. He was staying with his older sister and her American husband in the US when war broke out in Europe. Unable to return home, he joined the Canadian army for five years. He was subsequently posted to England and after D-Day saw active service in France in the Royal Canadian Corps of Signals.

After demobilisation in 1946, he enrolled at Goldsmiths University to study for a National Diploma in Art and Design but withdrew after three months. From 1947–50, Kidner taught at Pitlochry Prep School in Perthshire and it was here that he started to paint as a hobby. In 1949 he met and married his wife Marion Frederick, an American actress. From 1951 to 1952 he worked as a theatre designer in Bromley and Barnstaple whilst continuing to paint.

== Career ==
=== Early career ===
During a painting holiday in the south of France, Kidner met André Lhote who introduced him to Cubism and encouraged him to move to Paris and become a full-time painter. He travelled to Paris in 1953 where he sporadically attended Lhote's atelier. After two years he returned to North Devon where his brother was working as a GP. He moved to St Ives for several months where he became acquainted with Trevor Bell, Roger Hilton, Terry Frost, Patrick Heron, and Peter Lanyon.

On moving to London in 1957, Kidner was introduced to the New American Painting exhibition at the Tate Gallery where he saw the Abstract Expressionism of Jackson Pollock and Willem de Kooning. Kidner later became influenced by Mark Rothko's colour field paintings. These inspired his After Image paintings, sculptures and reliefs, executed between 1957 and 1962. Kidner attended a 1959 course run by Victor Pasmore and Harry Thubron which alerted him to the Bauhaus derived ideas of colour and led him towards a more objective use of colour.

Kidner's first solo exhibition was held at St Hilda's College, Oxford in 1959 where he showed his After Image paintings. In 1965 his work was featured in the op art exhibition The Responsive Eye at the Museum of Modern Art in New York, along with that of Bridget Riley.

=== Mature career ===
==== After Image (1959) ====
Kidner said that "optics presents a challenge that was once offered by perspective". He was referring to the examination of visual perception in the science of linear perspective developed by Leon Battista Alberti and other Renaissance artists in the 15th century. Kidner was also interested in the work of Seurat and the Neo Impressionists who had investigated the connection between the retina and the brain regarding colour perception, as seen in their Pointillist paintings. Rothko's colour field abstractions led Kidner to see colour as "pure sensation".

Later, Kidner's After Image works became hard-edged with flat uniform patterns, when he realised that optical activity producing shimmer is decreased by brushy paintwork and varied shapes.

==== Stripe (1961) ====
After Image became too limited for Kidner. He found that he wanted to approach colour in a more rational way, and began a series of striped paintings using two alternating colours.

==== Moire (1963) ====
By 1963, Kidner felt two colours was limiting, and an article on the Moiré effect in Scientific American showed him how he could introduce a third colour. The effect was first discovered in Japanese silks, when the material was folded, optical patterns and colours floated above the actual patterns and colour of the material. This method produced a dramatic effect when Kidner crossed two colour bands with a third at a slight angle, resulting in a completely new pattern, with a wave-like vertical image coming into view.

==== Wave (1969) and Columnns (1971) ====
The appearance of the wave captivated Kidner and wave theory became his obsession as he realised that a wave pattern produces many more possibilities than straight lines because waves can be put in or out of phase. As well as optical effects, he was interested in distinguishing form from colour. He applied three colours to four forms in rotation so that no form could be identified by a particular colour. This can be seen in his print Sussex (1967).

Sussex (1967)

In 1969, Kidner co–founded the Systems Group with Jeffrey Steele and others. Around this time, the notion of colour as form urged Kidner on to do a columnar sculpture of a wave. At this stage he became interested in number theory as the key to "the nature of order" and "the structure of reality", and was influenced by the work of Lohse. Kidner meticulously translated the column into a two-dimensional form as a painting by using a systematic method of measurements and colour-coding as seen in 1979's Column in Front of Its Own Image II.

Column in Front of Its Own Image II (1971)

==== Grids and Lattices (1973) and Stretched Elastic (1987) ====
At this stage Kidner began to be interested in the spaces between the lines and crisscross wavy lines began to emerge in his work, culminating in grids and lattices. These were sometimes in phase creating identical spaces in between and then sometimes out of phase so the spaces in between did not repeat. Kidner used this structure as a basis for creating many variations of this principle and stated that "the endless number of linear intersections both offer and resist any sort of visual resolution." Continuing with his investigation of grids and lattices, Kidner experimented with various materials. He stretched and distorted elastic cloth on moveable wooden frames in geometrical shapes in order to arrive at unexpected shapes, thus introducing randomness, instability, and change into his art. He felt that constructive art needed to take into account disorder as well as order.

==== Pentagon (1999) ====
By 1999, chaos theory became a profound influence on Kidner's work and geometric abstraction in the form of Penrose pentagons reprinted on paper became a critical tool as a metaphor for ordering the chaos in the world. This was Kidner's response to the many dystopian world events, such as global warming, war, ethnic cleansing, terrorism and intense nationalism. Kidner was intrigued by the fact that his pentagon patterns looked chaotic. His use of colour in these works was often random; colour formerly clarified the grid in his work, it now subverted it. He now invested more value in unplanned elements in his work. He wondered if there may be in chaos "some kind of order that perhaps we haven't yet recognised."

In his last decade, Kidner's work became more colourful and free. Titles such as Entangled Hyacinth Bulbs (2007), Invasion of Iraq: Surprise Resistance (2007), and Particle Evolution: The End of the Tunnel at CERN (2008) indicate their subject matter.

=== Later career ===
Kidner taught at numerous art schools, including the Bath Academy of Art (1962–82), the Slade School of Fine Art (1975–79), and the Chelsea College of Art (1981–85). In 1978 he was invited by Stass Paraskos to be an artist-in-residence at the Cyprus College of Art arts centre in Paphos, Cyprus.

Kidner's work was included in collections at Tate Britain, the Royal Academy, and the British Arts Council. In 2004, he was elected as a senior Royal Academician.

== Later life and death ==
Kidner was predeceased by his son in 1980 and his wife Marion in 2004. He suffered from progressive cerebella ataxia and had cancer. Until late 2009, he continued to work in his studio with the help and support of artists Adrian Richardson and Timothy Sawyer Shepard. Kidner's last show, Dreams of the World Order, took place at the Royal Academy in September 2009. Kidner died two months later at the age of 92.

== Bibliography ==
Exhibition catalogues

- Love Is a Virus from Outer Space [Catalogue of the exhibition held at Flowers East 2003] London.
- Michael Kidner: At-tension to the Wave [Catalogue of the exhibition held at Center for International Contemporary Arts, 1990] New York.
- Micheal Kidner RA: Dreams of the World Order 1960s [Catalogue of the exhibition held at Flowers East 25 September – 9 December 2009] London.
- Michael Kidner: No Goals in a Quicksand [Catalogue of the exhibition held at Flowers East 14 September – 13 October 2007] London.
