= Peter Lowe (artist) =

English artist

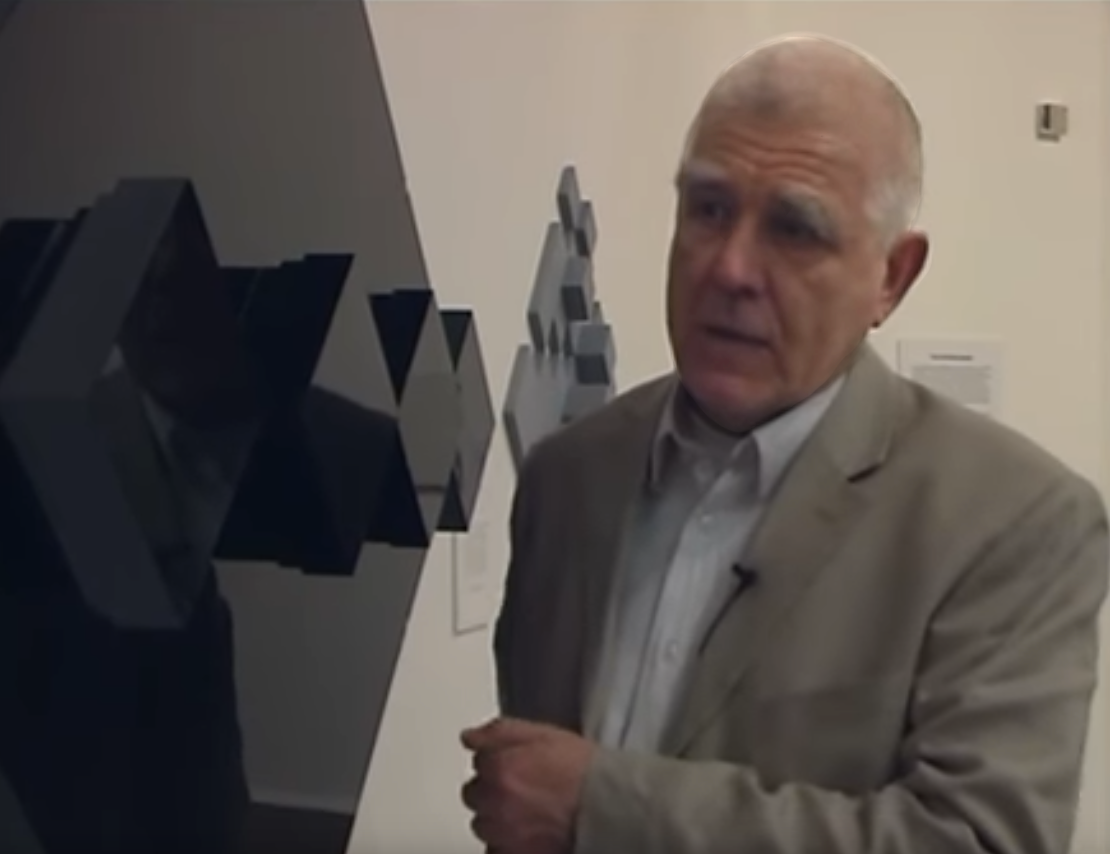
- Lowe in 2008
- Born: 17 June 1938 (age 88); Hackney, London
- Education: Goldsmiths‘ College of Art
- Occupations: Artist, Teacher
- Movement: Constructivist, Systems
- Spouse: Tessa Smith (1938-2007)
- Children: 2

Peter Lowe (born 17 June 1938) is an English artist, born in Hackney, London. His work is systematic, constructivist and concrete. It is mainly exhibited and appreciated in Europe, where it is held in many national collections.

== Biography ==
Lowe was originally inspired by Turner, his paintings gaining him entry into Goldsmiths‘ College of Art at the age of 16, where he was a student from 1954-60. Lowe was influenced by the Constructionists Kenneth Martin and Mary Martin, among others. He developed a preference for simple geometric shapes, which feature in most of his works. His early works include collage and rotational movement, while his later works include drawings, reliefs, computer prints and outdoor installations.

After graduating, Lowe worked as a teacher at the Leeds College of Art with Harry Thubron from 1962 to 1964. He also assisted Kenneth Martin at the Barry Summer School in Wales, before starting to lecture at Goldsmiths‘ College in 1965, retiring from teaching there in 2000.

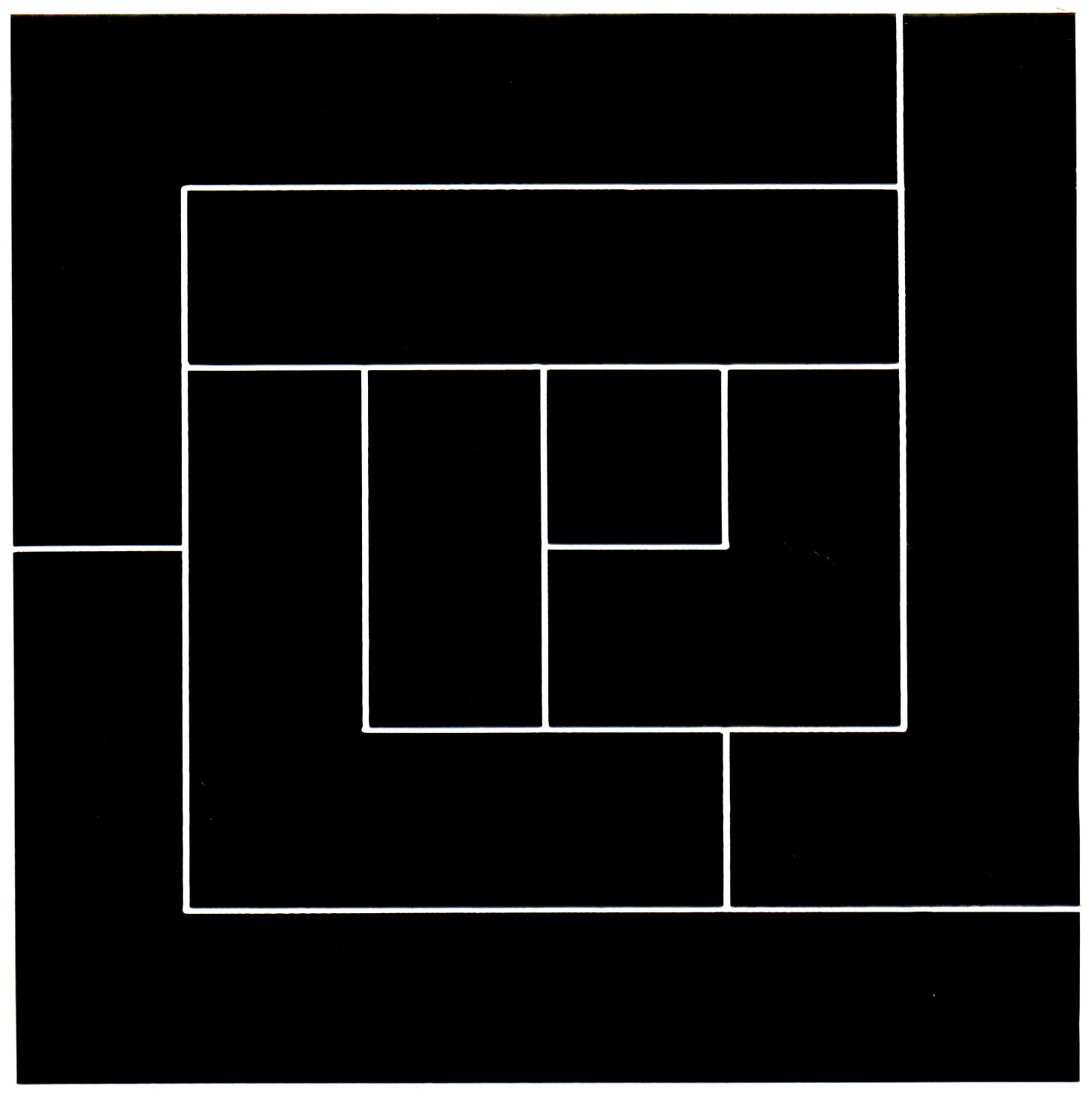
Spiral of 8 Integers

Lowe was one of the founding members of the Systems Group who exhibited in Helsinki at the Systeemi•System exhibition in 1969. Since 1974, he has been a member of Arbeitskreis.

Art historian Alan Fowler discusses Peter Lowe's systems work in his 2006 PhD thesis "Constructive Art in Britain 1913 - 2005". Lowe is also mentioned in Alastair Grieve's 2005 book "Constructed Abstract Art in England After the Second World War: A Neglected Avant-Garde". An interview with the artist by Fowler is given in the 2008 Southampton City Art Gallery exhibition catalogue "A Rational Aesthetic".

Peter Lowe married Tessa Smith (1938-2007) in 1960. They had two children and he lives in Tulse Hill, London.

== Selected Exhibitions ==
=== Solo ===
1974	Gardner Centre, University of Sussex
	Lucy Milton Gallery, London
1975	Galleria Primo Peano, Rome (with Norman Dilworth)
1980	Galeria Pavillion, Nowa Huta, Kraków
1981	Galerie Jeanne Buytaert, Antwerp
1987	Foranea, Vimercate, Monza, Italy
1990	Arte Struktura, Volume and Void, Milan
1991	Galerie Jeanne Buytaert, Antwerp
1994	Clare Hall Gallery, Cambridge
1999	Wellcome Institute of Neurology, London
2005	The Walk Gallery, London
2016	Waterhouse & Dodd, London

=== Group ===
1957	Young Contemporaries, R.B.A. Galleries, London
1963	Six English Painters, Drian Galleries, London
	Drian Artists, Drian Galleries
	The Geometric Environment, A.I.A. Gallery, London
	Plus Minus Inventions (with Colin Jones), A.I.A. Gallery
	Construction England, Arts Council
1964	Then and Now, City Art Gallery, Leeds
1966	Relief Constructions, I.C.A., London
	Constructions, Axiom Gallery, London
1967	Unit-Series-Progression, Arts Council (tour)
1968	Cinétisme-Spectacle-Environment, Maison de la Culture, Grenoble
	Constructions, Greenwich Theatre Gallery, London
	Constructions from the Arts Council Collection, Arts Council
1969	Systeemi•Systems, Amos Anderson Taidemuseo, Helsinki
1971	Matrix, Arnolfini Gallery, Bristol
1972	Systems, Whitechapel Gallery, London (and tour)
1973	Systems II, Polytechnic of Central London
1974	British Painting '74, Hayward Gallery, London
1976	Plus Minus, IAFKG/Southampton Art Gallery/Polytechnic of Central London
1980	Pier + Ocean: construction in the art of the seventies, Hayward Gallery, London
1981	Malcolm Hughes, Peter Lowe, Alan Reynolds, Galerie Renée Ziegler, Zürich
	Konstrukcja w Procesie [Construction in Process], Budrem plant, Łodź, Poland
1984	Norman Dilworth, Peter Lowe, Kenneth Martin, Galerie Ornis, The Hague
1999	Anthony Hill, Jeffrey Steele, Peter Lowe, Galeria Stara, Lublin, Poland
2000	Hill, Lowe, Steele, Raczko, Winiarski, Stabinski, Kuchnia Galeria, Warsaw
2005	22 of the Future for the Future of Vukovar, Muzeum Sztuki, Łodź
2007	Towards a Rational Aesthetic: Constructive Art in Post-war Britain, Osborne Samuel gallery, London
2008	A Rational Aesthetic, Southampton City Art Gallery
2014	The Social Bases of Abstract Art, Updown Gallery, Ramsgate
2017	British Constructivism, Pallant House, Chichester, UK
2018	British Art Fair, Saatchi Gallery, London
2021	Rhythm and Geometry, UEA, Norwich

== Works in Public Collections ==
- Arts Council Collection London
- Victoria and Albert Museum London
- Musée de Grenoble
- Museo de Arte Moderno, Fundacion Soto, Cuidad BolÌvar, Venezuela
- University of East Anglia
- National Museum Warsaw
- Peter Stuyvesant Foundation Amsterdam
- Kemin Kaupunki Taidesmuseo, Kemi. Finland
- Stedelijk Museum, Schiedam
- Alvar Alto Foundation, Pino Torinesi, Turin
- Museum of Modern Art Zagreb
- Commanderie Sint Jan, Nijmegen
- Museum of Art, Chelm, Poland
- Tate Britain
- Southampton City Art Gallery
- Mondriaanhuis, Amersfoort. Holland
- Peter C. Ruppert Collection, Würzburg
- Henry Moore Institute, Leeds
