= Inspection =

Organized examination or formal evaluation exercise

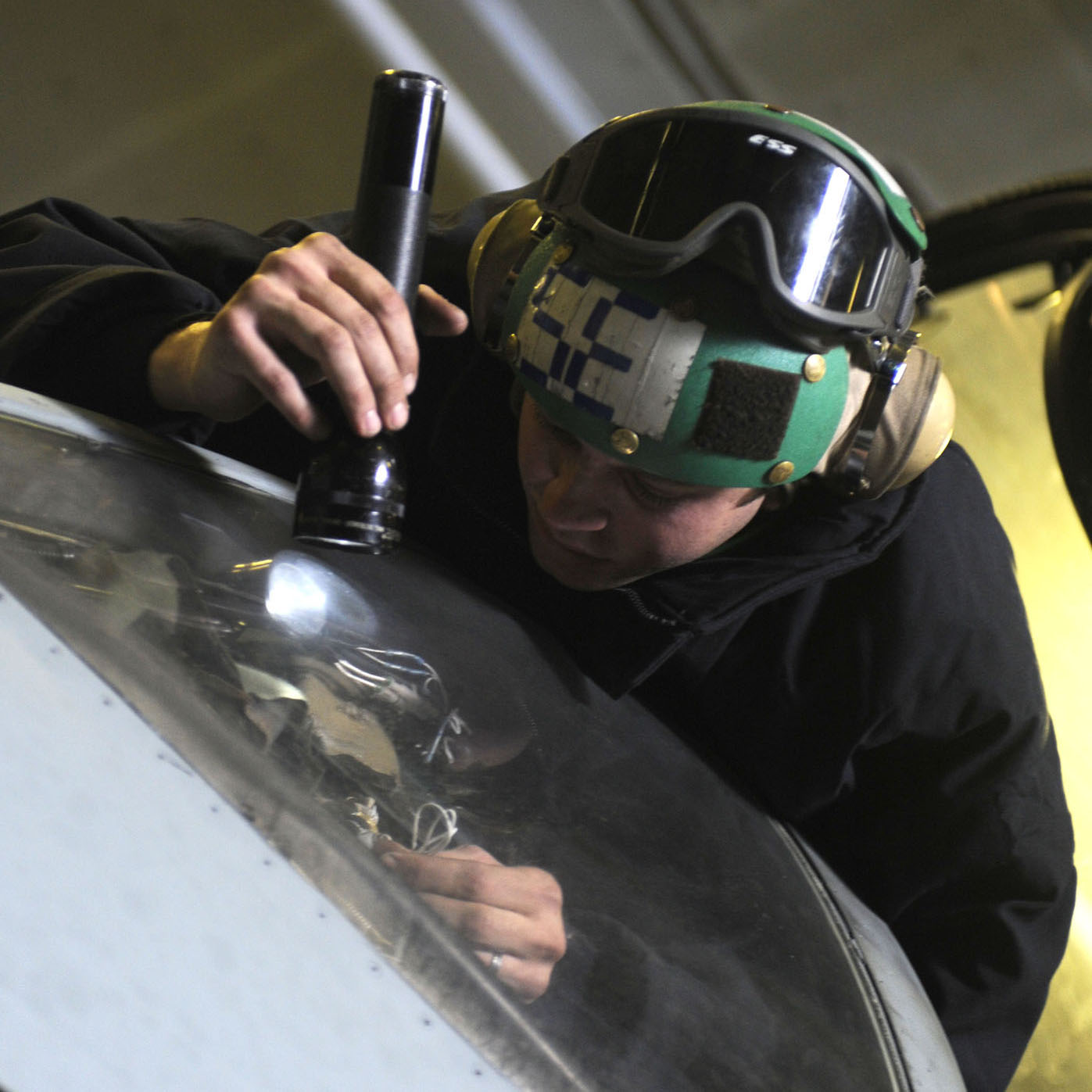
Maintenance check of electronic equipment on a U.S. Navy aircraft

An inspection is, most generally, an organized examination or formal evaluation exercise. In engineering activities inspection involves the measurements, tests, and gauges applied to certain characteristics in regard to an object or activity. The results are usually compared to specified requirements and standards for determining whether the item or activity is in line with these targets, often with a Standard Inspection Procedure in place to ensure consistent checking. Inspections are usually non-destructive.

Inspections may be a visual inspection or involve sensing technologies such as ultrasonic testing, accomplished with a direct physical presence or remotely such as a remote visual inspection, and manually or automatically such as an automated optical inspection. Non-contact optical measurement and photogrammetry have become common NDT methods for inspection of manufactured components and design optimisation.

A 2007 Scottish Government review of scrutiny of public services (the Crerar Review) defined inspection of public services as "... periodic, targeted scrutiny of specific services, to check whether they are meeting national and local performance standards, legislative and professional requirements, and the needs of service users."

A surprise inspection tends to have different results than an announced inspection. Leaders wanting to know how others in their organization perform can drop in without warning, to see directly what happens. If an inspection is made known in advance, it can give people a chance to cover up or to fix mistakes, which could lead to distorted and inaccurate findings. A surprise inspection, therefore, gives inspectors a better picture of the typical state of the inspected object or process than an announced inspection. It also enhances external confidence in the inspection process.

== Specific inspection ==
=== Manufacturing ===
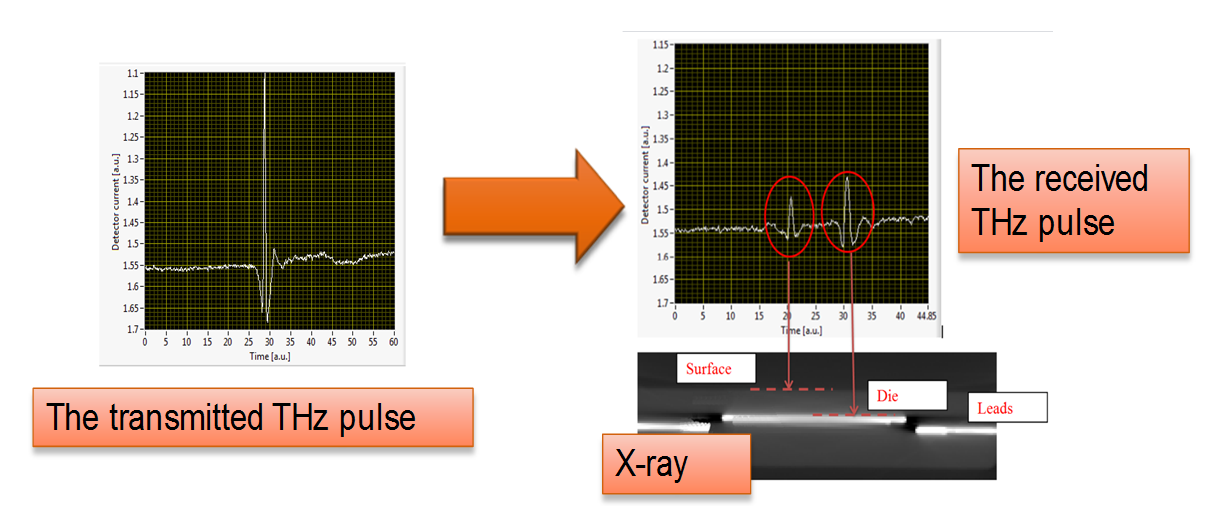
Inspection and measurement of the thickness of the different layers of an electronic chip using THz and X-ray radiation. THz has the privilege of being non-ionizing (non-destructive) but the resolution of X-ray is higher.

Quality related in-process inspection/verification is an essential part of quality control in manufacturing. This includes measuring, examining, testing, or gauging one or more characteristics of a product or process and comparing the results with specified requirements to determine whether is the requirements are met for each characteristic. Common examples of inspection by measurement or gauging include using a caliper or micrometer to determine if a dimension of a manufactured part is within the dimensional tolerance specified in a drawing for that part, and is thus acceptable for use.

Design for inspection (DFI) is a concept that should complement and work in collaboration with design for manufacturability (DFM) and design for assembly (DMA) to reduce product manufacturing cost and increase manufacturing practicality.

Photogrammetry is a modern way of visual inspection, delivering high accuracy and traceability for various industries. The portable 3D system is a versatile optical coordinate measuring machine (CMM) with a wide range of capabilities. Highly accurate point measurements can be taken with inspection carried out directly to CAD models, geometry or drawings.

=== Fire equipment ===
Most fire equipment needs to be inspected to make sure that, in the event of a fire, every effort has been taken to make sure it does not get out of control. Fire extinguishers are to be inspected every month by law and inspected by a servicing company at least once a year.

=== Business ===
In international trade several destination countries require pre-shipment inspection. The importer instructs the shipper which inspection company should be used. The inspector makes pictures and a report to certify that the goods that are being shipped and produced are in accordance with the accompanying documents.

Commodity inspection is other term that is used between buyers and sellers. The scope of work for commodity inspection depends to the buyers. Some buyers hire the inspection agencies only for pre-shipment inspections i.e. visual quality, quantity, packing, marking and loading inspections and some others request for higher level inspections and ask inspection agencies to attend in the vendor shops and inspect commodities during manufacturing processes. Normally inspection is done based on an agreed inspection and test plan (ITP).

=== Government ===
Historically, many famed rulers were recorded undertaking (or legendarily credited with) inspection tours of their realms—often in disguise—to disintermediate their officials and agents and see the actual conditions of their common subjects. In East Asia, famous examples include the investigations of the legendary Chinese ruler Shun, the state tours of the Wu Emperor of the Han, and the southern tours of the Kangxi and Qianlong Emperors of the Qing. In Europe, examples include Nero of Rome, Peter the Great of Russia, Henry IV and Napoleon of France, Matthias Corvinus of Hungary, Charles IX of Sweden, and James V of Scotland.

In modern government and politics, an inspection is the act of a monitoring authority administering an official review of various criteria (such as documents, facilities, records, and any other assets) that are deemed by the authority to be related to the inspection. Inspections are used for the purpose of determining if a body is complying with regulations. The inspector examines the criteria and talks with involved individuals. A report and evaluation follows such visits.

In the United States, the Food Safety Inspection Service is charged with ensuring that all meat and egg products are safe to consume and accurately labeled. The Meat Inspection Act of 1906 authorized the Secretary of Agriculture to order meat inspections and condemn any found unfit for human consumption.

The United Nations Monitoring, Verification and Inspection Commission is a regulatory body that inspects for weapons of mass destruction.

The Scottish Commission for the Regulation of Care regulates and inspects care services in Scotland.

A labour inspectorate is a government body that executes checks on compliance to the labour law. It performs inspections on the workplace or building site.

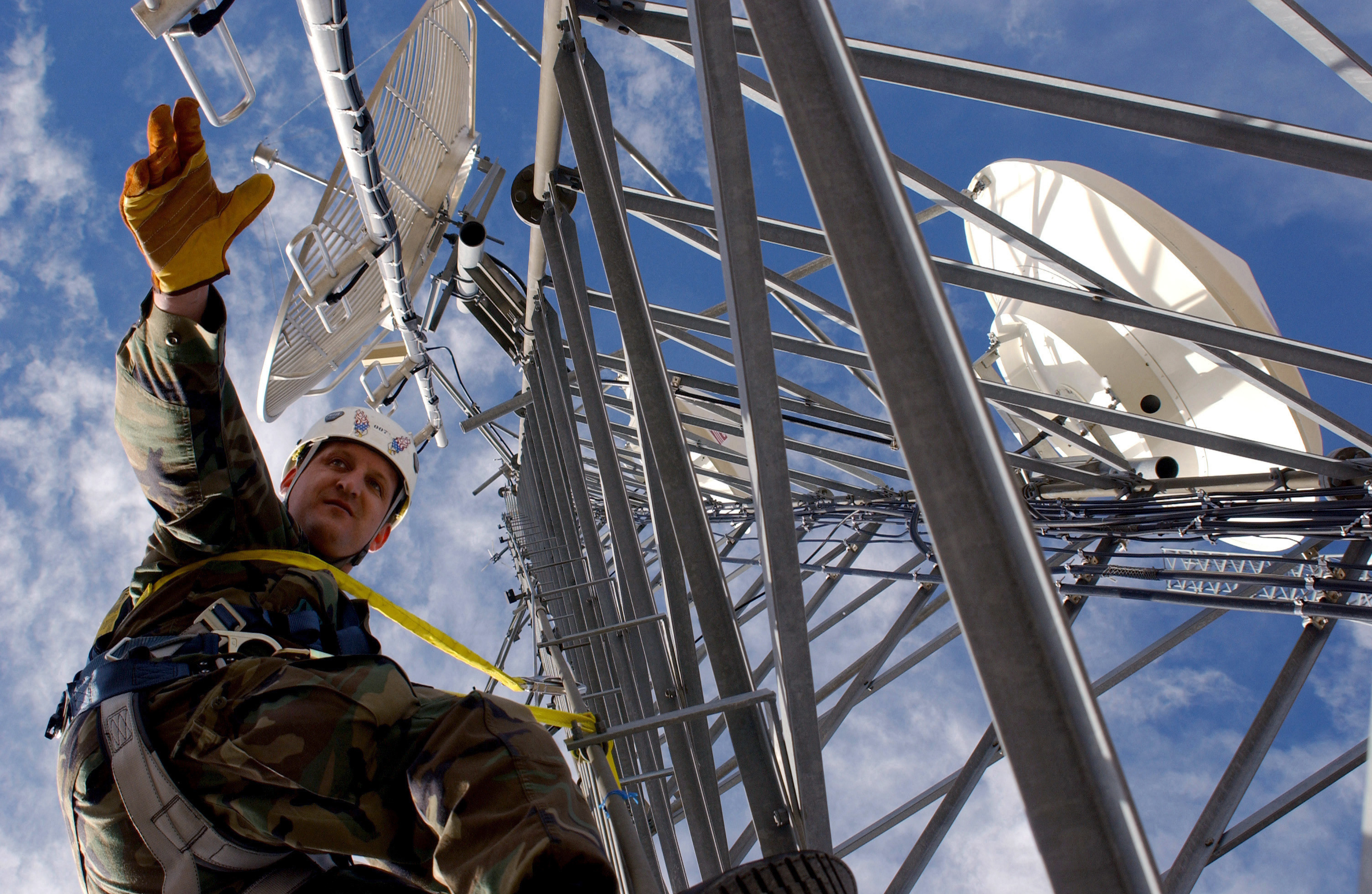
An Oregon Air National Guardsman makes an inspection of a radio-tower.

=== Road vehicles ===
A vehicle inspection, e.g., an annual inspection, is a necessary inspection required on vehicles to conform with laws regarding safety, emissions, or both. It consists of an examination of a vehicle's components, usually done by a certified mechanic. Vehicles pass a pre-warranty inspection, if, and only if, a mechanic provide evidence for the proper working condition of the vehicle systems specified in the type of inspection.

=== Engineering, mechanics ===
A mechanical inspection is usually undertaken to ensure the safety or reliability of structures or machinery.

In Europe bodies involved in engineering inspection may be assessed by accreditation bodies according to ISO 17020 "General criteria for the operation of various types of bodies performing inspection". This standard defines inspection as "examination of a product, process, service, or installation or their design and determination of its conformity with specific requirements or, on the basis of professional judgment, with general requirements".

Non-destructive examination (NDE) or nondestructive testing (NDT) is a family of technologies used during inspection to analyze materials, components and products for either inherent defects (such as fractures or cracks), or service induced defects (damage from use). Some common methods are visual, industrial computed tomography scanning, microscopy, dye penetrant inspection, magnetic-particle inspection, X-ray or radiographic testing, ultrasonic testing, eddy-current testing, acoustic emission testing, and thermographic inspection. In addition, many non-destructive inspections can be performed by a precision scale, or when in motion, a checkweigher. Stereo microscopes are often used for examining small products like circuit boards for product defects.

Pipeline inspection is a crucial process in ensuring the integrity and safety of pipelines used in various industries such as oil and gas, fertilizer, process industries, food and beverages, water distribution, and transportation. This systematic examination involves the assessment of pipeline materials, structural integrity, corrosion levels, and potential defects using advanced technologies like ultrasonic testing, magnetic flux leakage, and visual inspections. Regular inspections help identify issues early, allowing for timely maintenance and reducing the risk of leaks or catastrophic failures, thus ensuring the efficient and safe operation of these vital infrastructure components.

Inspection and technical assistance during turnarounds helps to decrease costly downtime as well as ensures restart of operations quickly and safely.

=== Medical ===
A medical inspection is the thorough and unhurried visualization of a patient, this requires the use of the naked eye.

=== Military ===
An examination vessel is a craft used to inspect ships entering or leaving a port during wartime.

=== Railroad ===
The railroad's inspection locomotive were special types of steam locomotives designed to carry railroad officials on inspection tours of the railroad property.

=== Real estate ===
A property condition assessment is the examination for purposes of evaluating a commercial or business property's condition often as a part of a due diligence investigation for a company to know what it is buying. Building code officials do a building inspection to determine code compliance in new or altered buildings before issuing a certificate of occupancy. Residential inspections not for code compliance are called a home inspection. There are numerous types of more specific real estate and infrastructure inspections such as windstorm inspection, energy audit, and pipeline video inspection.

=== Software inspection ===
Software inspection, in software programming, refers to peer review of any work product by skilled individuals who look for bugs using a defined test protocol.

== See also ==
- Digital Product Passport
- Issue tracking systems in government
- Maintenance (technical)
- Pre-purchase inspection
- Review
- Site survey
- United States Postal Inspection Service
- Workers and Peasants Inspection
