= Hurricane-proof building =

Method for building to survive against strong winds

High winds and storm surge, such as can be created by a tropical cyclone, can cause significant damage to structures. A variety of methods can help a building survive strong winds and storm surge.

== Storm surge considerations ==
Waves along coastal areas can destroy many buildings. Buildings should preferably be built on high ground to avoid waves. If waves can reach the building site, the building should be elevated on steel, concrete, or wooden pilings or anchored to solid rock.

== Wind loading considerations ==
=== Foundation ===
Wind on the roof surfaces can cause negative pressures that create a lifting force sufficient to lift the roof off the building. Once this occurs, the building is weakened considerably, and the rest will likely fail as well. To minimize this vulnerability, the upper structure ought to be anchored through the walls to the foundation.

Several methods can be used to anchor the roof. Typically, roof trusses are "toenailed" into the top of the walls, but this provides insufficient force to resist high winds. Hurricane ties nail into the wall and wrap over the trusses to provide higher force resistance.

==== Mobile home tie down to the foundation ====
Interlocking metal pan roof systems installed on mobile homes can fail under the pressure differential (lift) created by the high-velocity winds passing over the surface plane of the roof. This is compounded by the wind entering the building allowing the building interior to pressurize, lifting the underside of the roof panels, resulting in the destruction of the building.

To mitigate this pressure differential, pre-installed aluminum tabular channels can be permanently fastened perpendicularly across the top of the interlocking ribs of the metal roof system without disturbing the flow of rainwater at the eaves mid-span and ridge locations of the building.

=== Earth-sheltering ===
Earth-sheltered construction is generally more resistant to strong winds and tornadoes than standard construction. Cellars and other earth-sheltered components of other buildings can provide safe refuge during tornadoes.

=== Dome homes ===
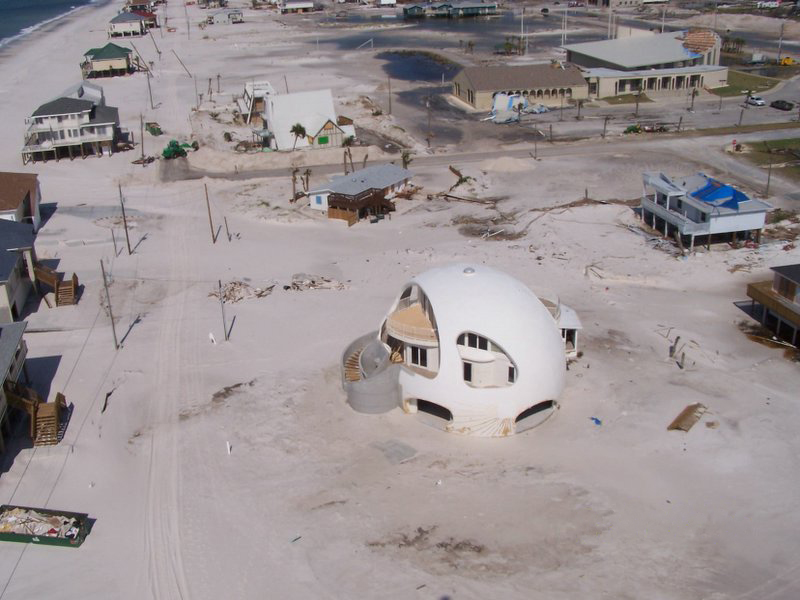
A monolithic dome 1005 Ariola Drive, Pensacola Beach, Florida, after Hurricane Dennis in 2005

The physical geometry of a building affects its aerodynamic properties and how well it can withstand a storm. Geodesic dome roofs or buildings have low drag coefficients and can withstand higher wind forces than a square building of the same area. Even stronger buildings result from monolithic dome construction.

=== Log house ===
A Category 5 hurricane-proof log house is resistant to winds up to 245 miles per hour (394 km/h). Wall logs in such construction must be made of glued laminated timber and all other components of the house, including hurricane straps, must be hurricane-resistant.

=== Round house ===
A round, or multiple-sided home, is more resistant to hurricane strength winds. The round design allows the wind to blow around the home, reducing the build-up of pressure on one side. Additionally, with the roof and floors built using a radial truss array, that allows any potential energy from sustained winds to disperse across the entire structure instead of building up in one area.

== Building components ==
Building openings such as garage doors and windows are often weak points susceptible to failure by wind pressure and blowing debris. Once failure occurs, wind pressure builds up inside the building resulting in the roof lifting off the building. Hurricane shutters can provide protection.

Doors can be blown into the house by wind, causing potential structural failure.

Windows can be constructed with plastic panes, shatterproof glass, or glass with protective membranes. The panes are often more firmly attached than normal window panes, including using screws or bolts through the edges of larger panes. Concrete anchor screws are used to secure windows to the concrete structure surrounding them.

Wood has a relatively high degree of flexibility, which can be beneficial under certain building stresses.

Reinforced concrete is a strong, dense material that can withstand the destructive power of very high winds and high-speed debris if used in a building that is designed properly.

== Regulation ==
After Hurricane Andrew in 1992 caused $16 billion in insured damage, the state of Florida established new building standards and enforcement. The state increased performance criteria for wind-load provisions and adopted new wind provisions from the American Society of Civil Engineers. One important addition to the new code was the requirement of missile-impact resisting glass, which can withstand high-velocity impact from wind-borne debris during a hurricane. Many houses built in South Florida since Hurricane Andrew are made out of concrete blocks covered with stucco, sometimes called CBS for "concrete block-stucco", additionally reinforced with concrete pillars, hurricane-strapped roof trusses, and codes requirements for adhesives and types of roofing. Florida also designated high velocity hurricane zones (i.e. High Velocity Hurricane Zone) with special requirements defined for Miami-Dade and Broward Counties.

Hong Kong requires many structures to withstand winds from typhoons.

== Examples of cyclonic construction methods ==
Residential construction in Darwin Northern Australia

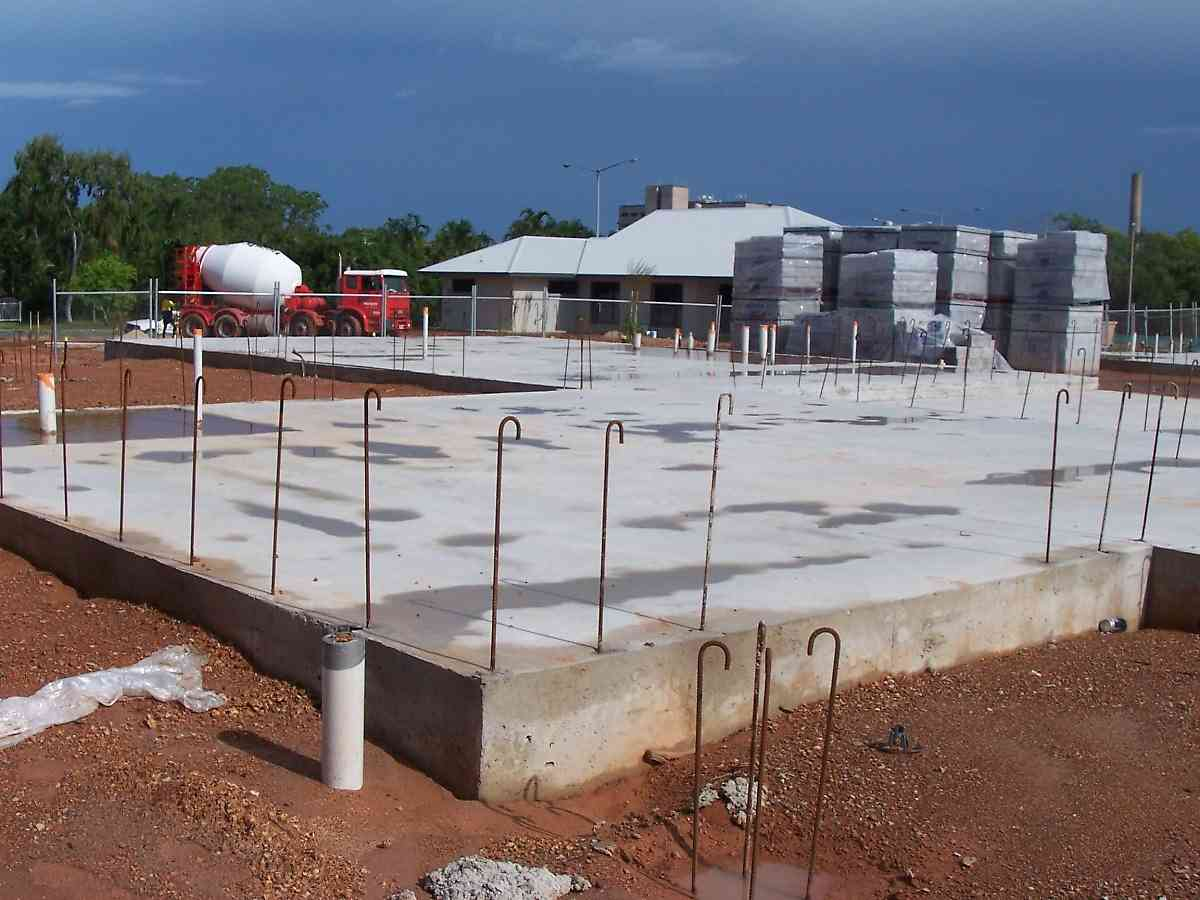
Starter bars cast into concrete slab for blockwork wall reinforcing

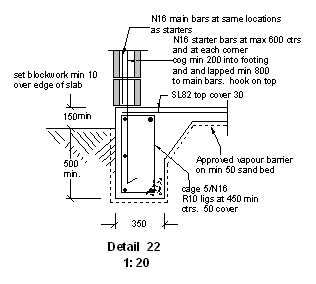
Detail of reinforcing steel at edge of concrete raft slab

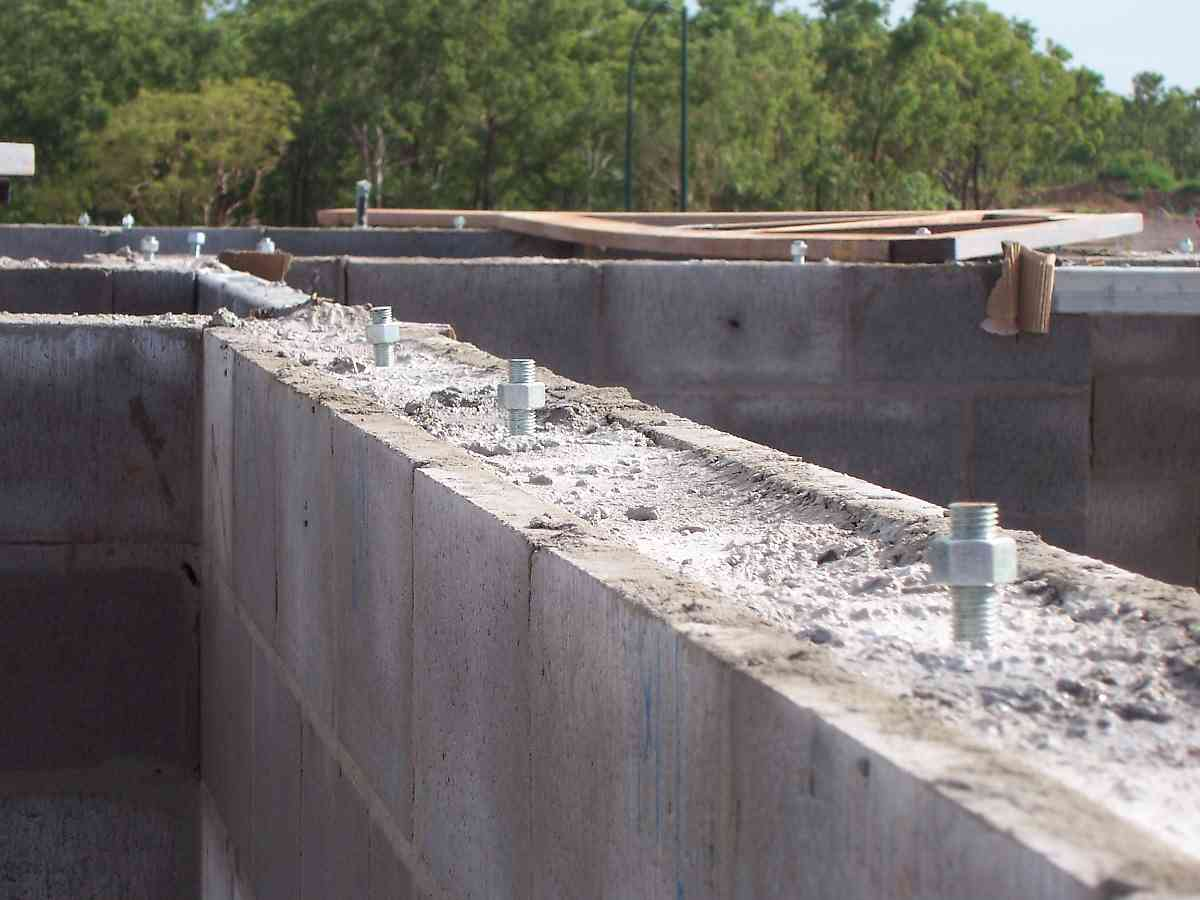
16 mm Cast in hold down bolts. 150 to 300 long cast into blockwork bond beams

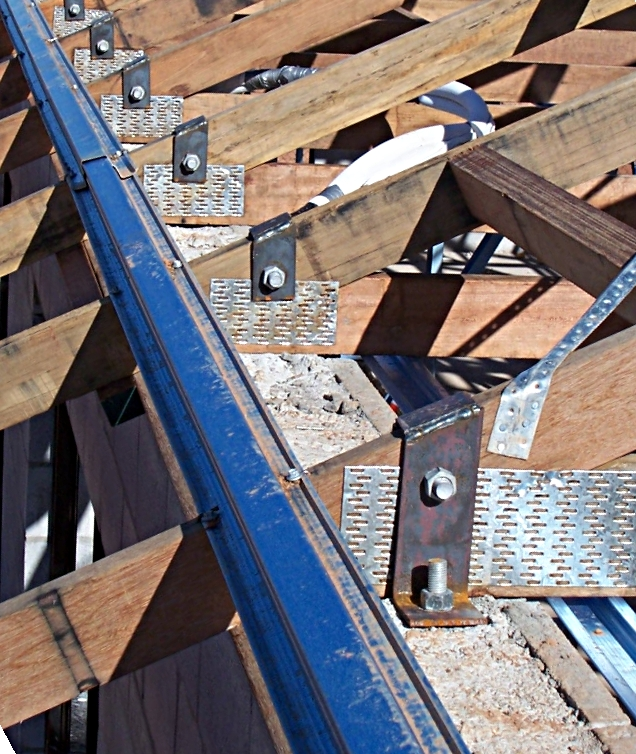
HD bolt to truss connection. also seen, metal roof batten fixing, speedbrace end fixing.

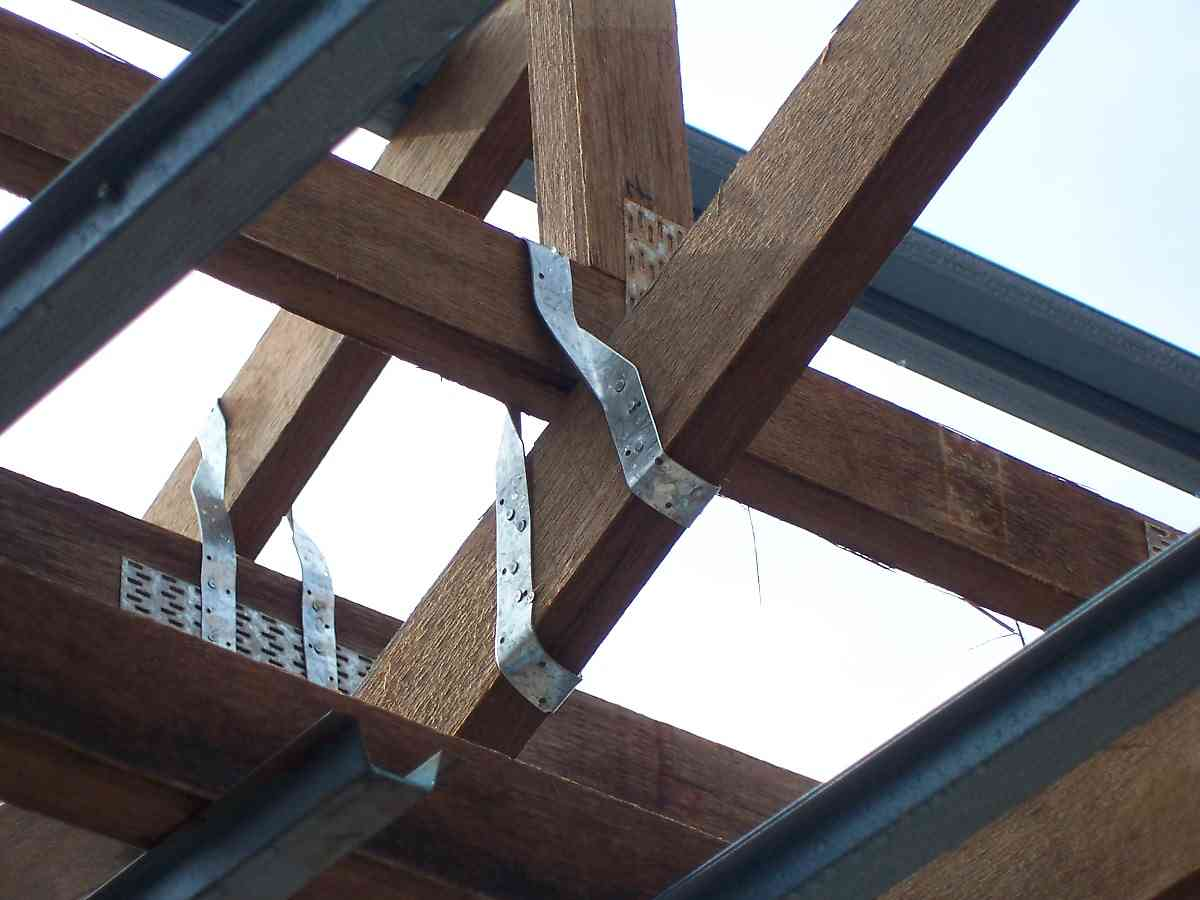
Typical roof member connector straps

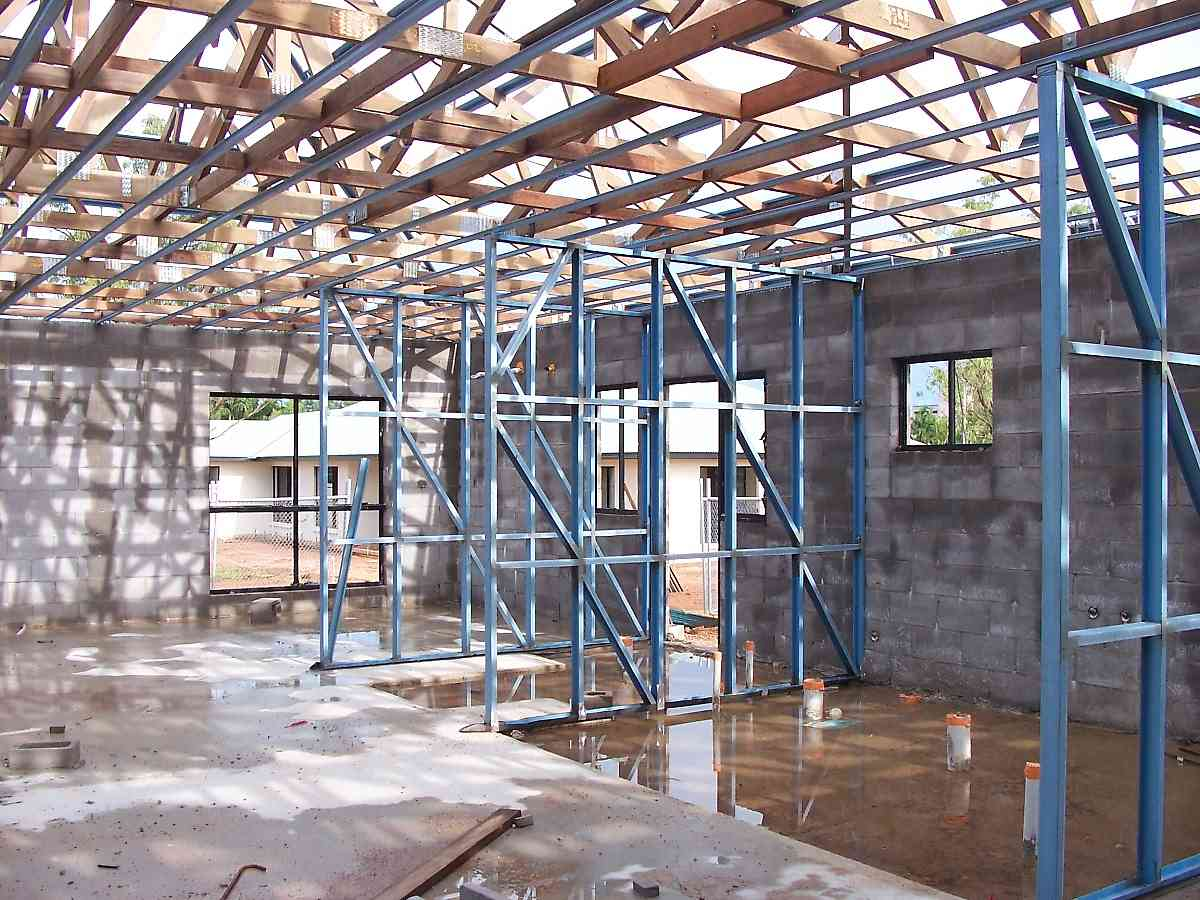
Internal mig welded shearwalls

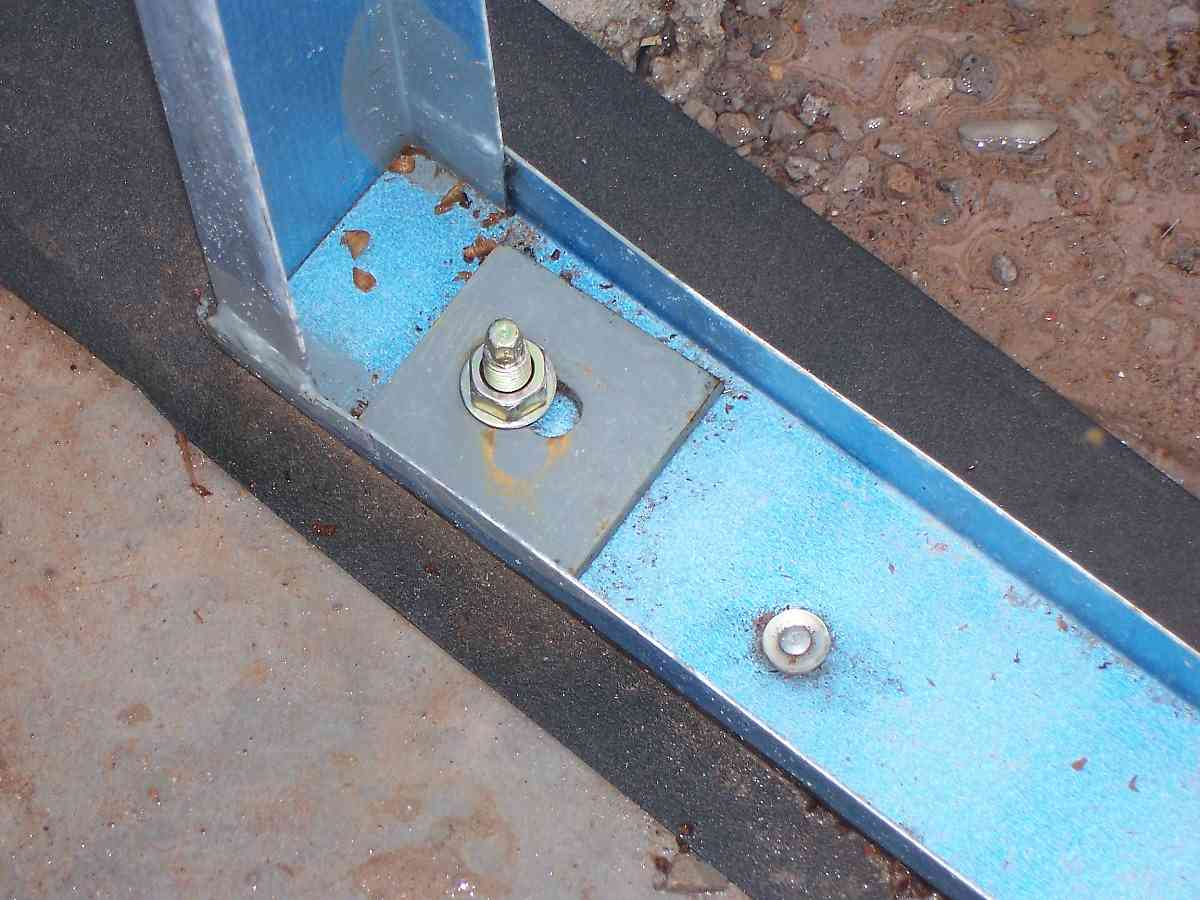
Shearwall to slab connection, M12 chemsets through 6 plate washers, typ. at ends and 900ctrs

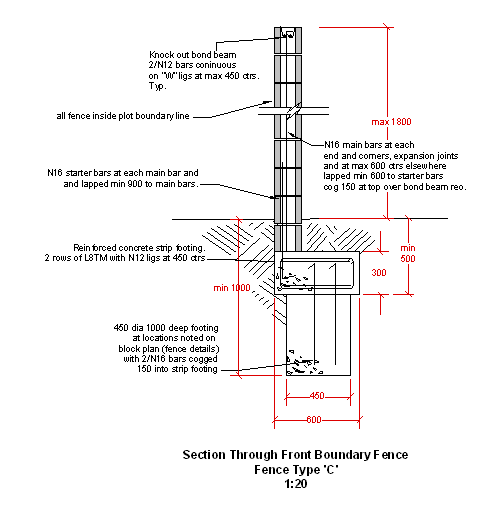
Sketch of 200 series reinforced blockwork fence wall. Terrain category 3 (close to sea front)

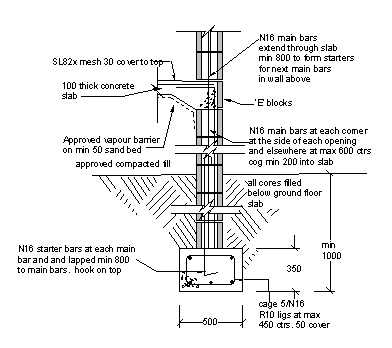
Sketch of typical foundation layout for sloping ground

== See also ==
- Autonomous building
- Building
- Natural building
- Bubble Houses (Hobe Sound, Florida)
- Dymaxion house
- Hurricane preparedness
- Hurricane shutter
- HurriQuake nail (for resisting hurricanes and earthquakes)
- Structural engineering
- Windstorm inspection
