= CVSA =

CVSA may stand for:

- Computerized Voice Stress Analysis
- Commercial Vehicle Safety Alliance
