= Standard inspection procedure =

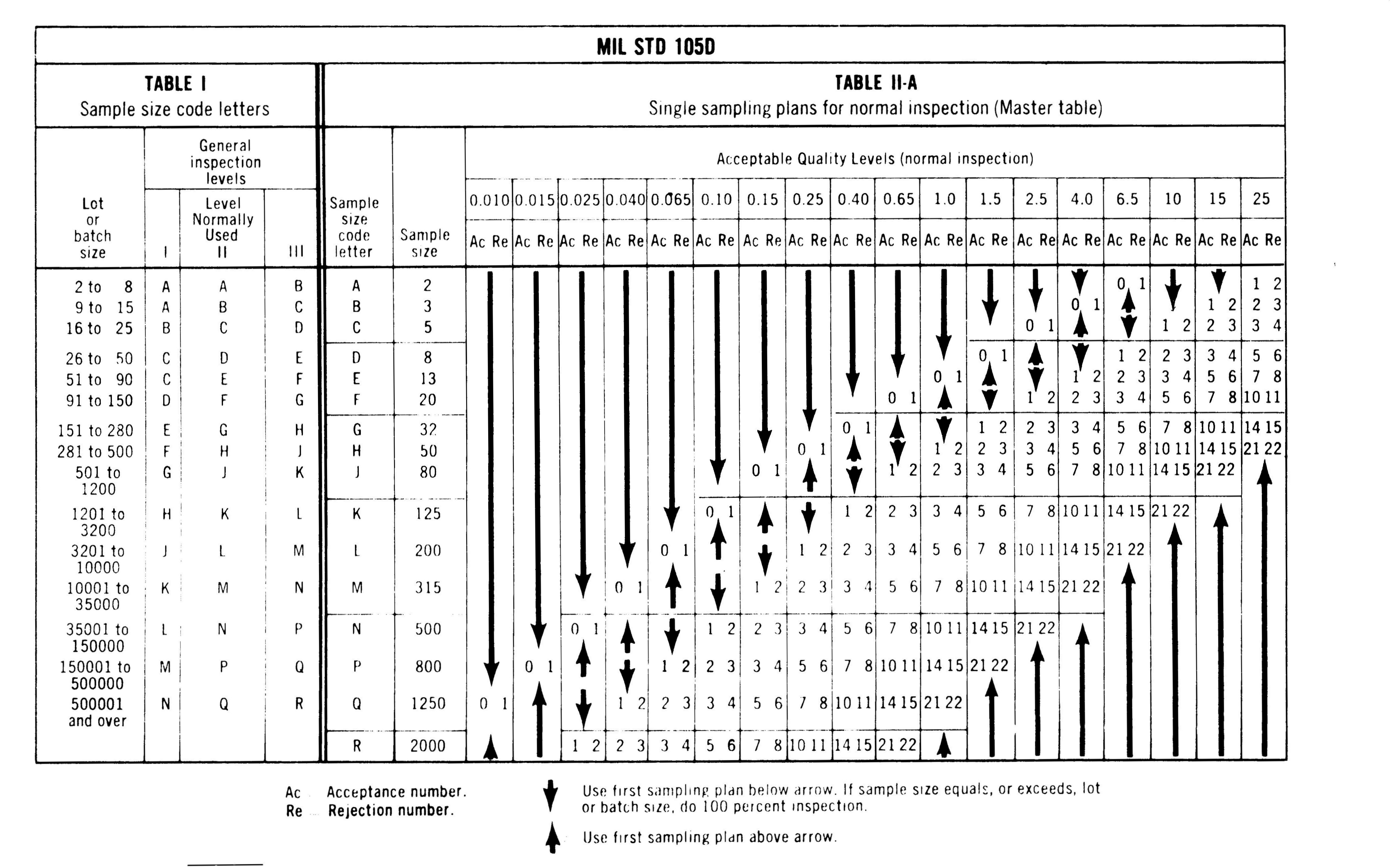
An example of a SIP - MIL-STD-105 D Quick reference Table, TABLE I and TABLE IIA

A standard inspection procedure ('SIP' as an acronym) is a process by which a number of variables may be checked for compliance against a set of rules. SIPs are used by various organizations including the Commercial Vehicle Safety Alliance (CVSA) and the U.S. Department of Defense.
