= Hurricane shutter =

Temporary building reinforcement

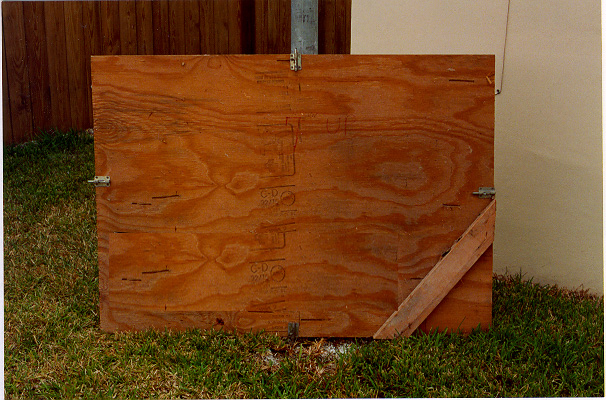
A hurricane shutter made out of plywood.

Hurricane coverings, commonly known as shutters, are used in hurricane mitigation to protect houses and other structures from damage caused by storms. Hurricane shutters are used to prevent windows from being broken by flying objects during a storm. Although the negative pressure caused by high-speed wind flowing over a building roof can cause the roof to fail with the building envelope intact, broken windows allow the air pressure to rise inside a building, creating an even greater pressure difference and increasing the likelihood of roof failure.

Shutters are frequently constructed from steel or aluminium, but homeowners sometimes use the low-cost alternative of plywood. The shutters are affixed to the outside of the building with screws, hurricane clips, or a track system. Advanced shutters may be motorized, and they may fold away when not in use.

== Types of hurricane coverings ==
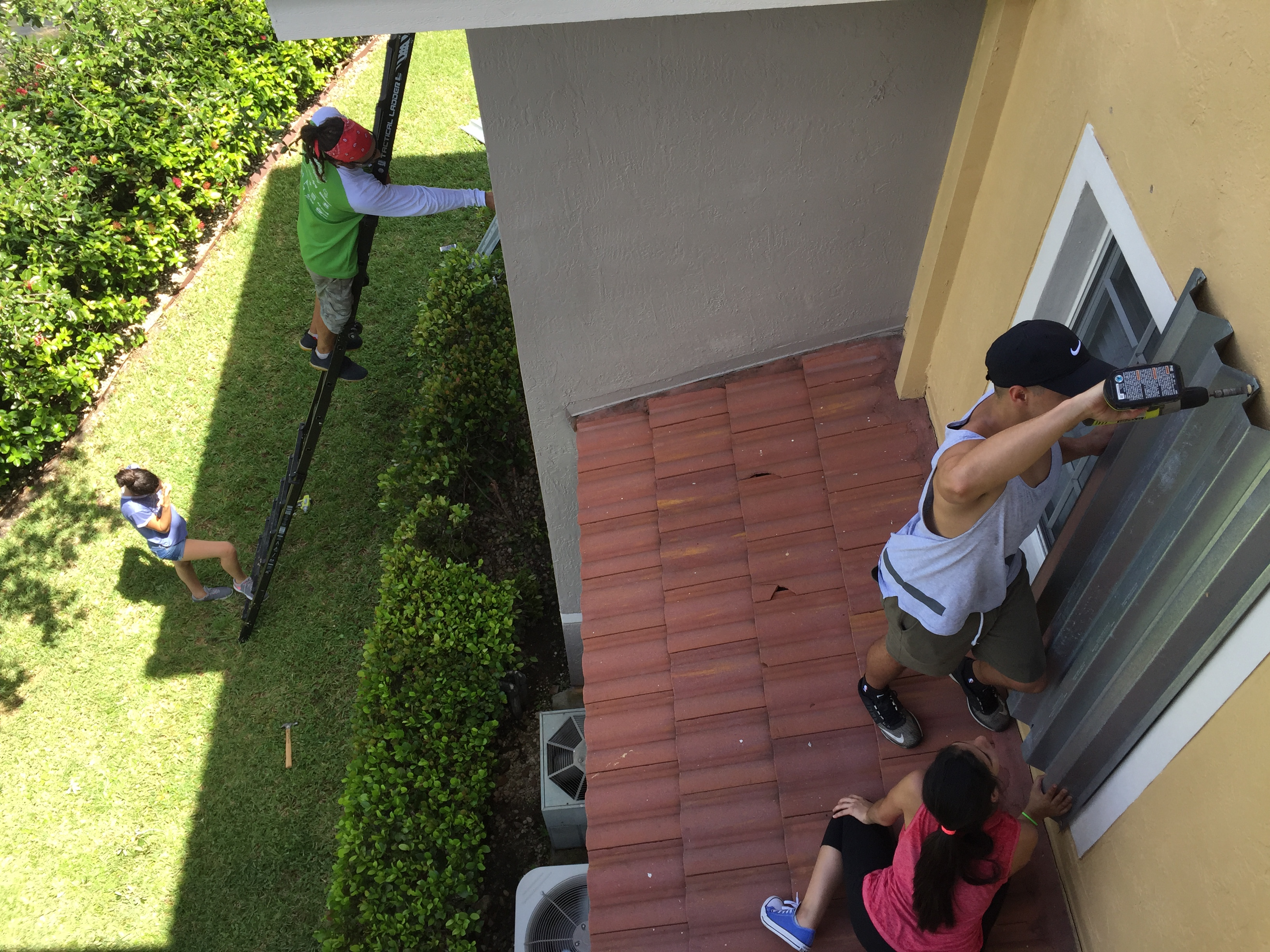
Residents in Doral, Florida, installing hurricane shutters in preparation for Hurricane Irma

Three major types of shutters are known alternatively as panel systems. They are usually made of plywood, metal (aluminium or steel), or polycarbonate plastic. Lexan panels are transparent, and may be flat or have been heat-formed into a corrugated shape to further increase impact resistance. Panels must be attached to the structure via screws in a direct mount or on tracks. When not in use, storm panels are stored in an easy to reach location. Newly constructed homes sometimes have an assigned area for storage of storm panels.

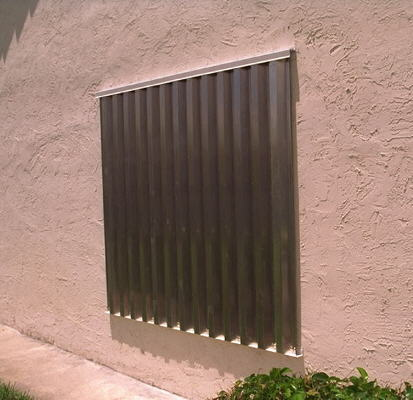
A panel system hurricane shutter made out of aluminum or steel.

Another type of shutter is an accordion shutter which is made from interlocking vertical blades which slide into place horizontally.

Another type is the roll-up or rolling shutter, consisting of a series of slats that form a curtain with both sides of the curtain being inserted into guide rails. The curtain is then rolled onto an axle which is covered by a housing. Rolling shutters can be operated manually by gear, by pull strap or can be motorized independently or in conjunction with a manual override. Motorized shutters can be operated by either a switch or remote and can be controlled either individually or in groups.

On loss of power caused by hurricanes, motorized shutters must be operated manually, requiring either access to the motor (which can be difficult) or a pre-installed manual override. Most often, a manual override is operated using a gear. When deployed, all hurricane shutters require special techniques for firefighters to gain access to the interior of a structure.

Other types are the Bahamas, Colonials, and Tapco Hurricane Screens. Bahama shutters are mounted above the window creating shade when they are open, and when in use, they are brought down and secured over the window. Colonials are similar to the wooden shutters, but are made of aluminum. They hinge on the side of the windows and swing shut to protect the opening. Tapco Hurricane Screens are powder coated and made out of heavy-duty aluminum frames with stainless steel mesh used for the screening material.

Also used are awning shutters, with a horizontal hinge above the opening being protected.

Hurricane fabric coverings are a newer, relatively lower cost type of shutter. Tested and approved systems are made from polypropylene fibers, polyamide fibers or from laminated or cast PVC.

In 2011, a flat hurricane shutter system developed by UltraTek Worldwide was approved by Florida Building Code. The unique system uses a synthetic rubber bracket to absorb hurricane forces, allowing a panel that is completely clear while weighing 11.3 oz/square foot, nearly half the weight of a traditional metal panel.

== Building codes for hurricane shutters ==
Both the International Building Code (IBC) and the International Residential Code use the criteria set forth in ASTM E1886 & E1996 with regards to hurricane building material product approval. These test method norms describe the standardized tests to measure the impact resistance of a shutter and its resistance to cyclic wind pressure. The IBC's requirements are adaptable to all levels of required wind speed.

The term impact resistant is defined as shutters, windows, and doors that have been proven to resist the impact from large windborne debris (defined by the test standards as a 9-pound 2x4 lumber missile striking end on at 34 mph).

The Florida Building Code (FBC) is in most aspects similar to the IBC in regard to the testing and approval of hurricane shutters. According to the code, shutters are required for home built since 2001 unless the windows use impact-resistant glass. The Miami-Dade County norms, often considered the most stringent requirements for hurricane shutters, rely on self-developed testing methods TAS201, 202 and 203. Passing the tests prescribed by the TAS norms is required only for shutters approved for use in the Florida HVHZ (High Velocity Hurricane Zone). The Florida Building Code will accept testing performed by TAS methods for inclusion in the FBC Database of approved building products.

Both Miami-Dade County and the State of Florida maintain web-searchable databases of products approved for use as hurricane protection. These typically include not only actual test results from certified independent testing laboratories, they also contain "Product Approval Drawings" or "Installation Instructions" which provide specifications for hurricane shutter assembly and installation. Both the product and installation method must be shown to be in compliance with these drawings in order for a shutter to be considered "code-rated".

Besides the Florida Building Code and Miami-Dade County, there is also the Code from the Texas Department of Insurance commonly known as TDI. The Code from the Texas Department of Insurance is in many aspects similar to the International Building Code.

== See also ==
- Hurricane preparedness
- Hurricane-proof building
- Product certification
- Window shutter
