= RVI =

RVI may mean:

- Radio Vlaanderen Internationaal, a Belgian radio broadcasting service
- Rapid Visual Imaging, a technique used in moving media
- Residual Value Insurance
- Renault Véhicules Industriels, a French truck and bus manufacturer (now called Renault Trucks)
- The Royal Victoria Infirmary in Newcastle upon Tyne, England
- Rexx Variable Interface
- Roberston Ventilation Industries
- Rapid Virtualization Indexing, an AMD technology
- Remote visual inspection
- Recently viewed items
- Rostov-on-Don Airport (IATA airport code)
- Routed VLAN Interface
