= Listed buildings in Longridge =

Longridge is a civil parish in Ribble Valley, Lancashire, England. It contains 15 listed buildings that are recorded in the National Heritage List for England. Of these, one is at Grade II*, the middle grade, and the others are at Grade II, the lowest grade. The parish contains the town of Longridge and surrounding countryside. Most of the listed buildings are houses and farmhouses. The others include three churches, an inscribed stone, a tunnel portal, and a war memorial.

== Key ==
Grade	Criteria
II*	Particularly important buildings of more than special interest
II	Buildings of national importance and special interest

== Buildings ==
Name and location	Photograph	Date	Notes	Grade
Alston Old Hall; 53.79665°N 2.59105°W	—	Early 15th century (possible)	A timber-framed house, later encased in sandstone and with a slate roof. It consists of a single-storey hall and a two-storey cross wing; there are two further wings at the rear. The windows are mullioned, and the doorway has a plain surround. Inside, the hall is open to the tie-beam level.	II*
Sharley Fold; 53.83074°N 2.59928°W	—	1619	A sandstone house with a slate roof in two storeys. Most of the windows are mullioned, and some are modern. The porch is also modern, and has a doorway with a chamfered surround and a triangular head. At the rear is a wing and an outshut.	II
Hacking Hobs; 53.82352°N 2.60844°W	—	Early 17th century	The house is in rendered sandstone with a slate roof. There are two storeys with an attic, and the house has a T-shaped plan. To the left is a single-storey extension. Most of the windows are sashes, and the doorway, in a modern porch, has a moulded surround.	II
Bury's Farmhouse; 53.81654°N 2.59365°W	—	17th century	The house contains earlier cruck trusses, and has been remodelled and altered. It is in sandstone with quoins and a slate roof. The house was originally in a single storey, but a second storey was added in the 18th century. Many of the windows have been altered, and they are in various types. Inside the house are two full cruck trusses, and an inserted floor.	II
The Hills Farmhouse; 53.84270°N 2.57296°W	—	17th century	A sandstone house with a stone-slate roof. It has two storeys. Most of the windows are mullioned, some are blocked, and others are modern.	II
The Written Stone; 53.83598°N 2.56938°W		1655	A piece of sandstone carrying an inscription. It is about 8 feet (2.4 m) long, 2 feet (0.61 m) wide, and 18 inches (460 mm) deep.	II
Written Stone Farmhouse; 53.83579°N 2.56997°W	—	Late 18th century (probable)	A sandstone house with quoins and a slate roof, in two storeys. It has an L-shaped plan, and a front of three bays. The windows and doorway have plain surrounds, and the windows are mullioned. The central window in the upper floor and the doorway both have semicircular heads.	II
6–44 Higher Road; 53.83114°N 2.59676°W		1793	A row of sandstone houses with slate roofs, built by one of the earliest terminating building societies in England. They have two storeys and cellars entered at the rear, and each house has one bay. The windows and doorways have plain surrounds. The doorways are grouped in threes, the centre door leading to the rear yard. The cellars were used for handloom weaving.	II
Dilworth Brows Farmhouse; 53.84038°N 2.57692°W	—	1839	A pebbledashed stone house with quoins and a slate roof. It has two storeys and two bays. The windows are sashes, and the doorway has a plain surround.	II
Tunnel Portal; 53.83522°N 2.59179°W		1839	The west portal of a tunnel, now blocked, for the Preston and Longridge Railway. It is in sandstone and consists of an elliptical arch surrounded by rusticated voussoirs, and with an inscribed keystone. It is flanked by curved abutments.	II
Church of Our Lady, Alston Lane; 53.80869°N 2.61308°W		1856–57	A Roman Catholic church by Joseph and Charles Hansom. It is in sandstone with a steep slate roof, and consists of a nave and chancel under a continuous roof. In the east wall is window with geometrical tracery, and the west wall has diagonal buttresses, and an octagonal bellcote with a pointed cap. Inside the church is a west gallery.	II
Alston Hall; 53.80024°N 2.59558°W		1874–76	A country house designed by Alfred Darbyshire, and later used for other purposes. It is built in sandstone with slate roofs, and is in Tudor Gothic style. It has two storeys and attics, with a four-storey tower, incorporating a porte-cochère to the right, and a single-storey range with a square turret at the northeast. The garden front has three bays, the first two bays projecting forward and gabled. In the left bay is a two-storey square bay window, the right bay contains a single-storey canted bay window, and in its roof is a dormer. Included in the listing is a stable block and a walled garden.	II
St Wilfrid's Church; 53.83178°N 2.60752°W		1880s	A Roman Catholic church by Thomas Withnell, in sandstone with a slate roof. It consists of a nave with a clerestory, a chancel with a polygonal apse, an east porch, a polygonal northwest baptistry, and a northwest steeple. The steeple has a north doorway, angle buttresses, lancet windows and bell openings, and an octagonal spire. The aisle windows are also lancets.	II
St Paul's Church; 53.83125°N 2.60013°W		1886–88	The church was designed by Ewan Christian, and the tower was added in 1936–37. It is in sandstone with a slate roof, and consists of a nave with a clerestory, aisles, a chancel, north and south porches, a north organ chamber and vestry, and a west tower. The tower has a west doorway, a west window, angle buttresses, and an embattled parapet with corner pinnacles. The windows contain Perpendicular tracery.	II
War Memorial; 53.83186°N 2.60733°W	—	1920	The war memorial is in the churchyard of St Wilfrid's Church. It consists of low sandstone plinth on which is another plinth and a statue in white marble. The statue depicts Christ on the cross with a wounded or dead serviceman lying at His feet. The inscriptions on the marble plinth include the names of those who were lost in both World Wars.	II
