= Windstorm inspection =

A windstorm inspection, also referred to as a windstorm mitigation inspection, windstorm insurance inspection or wind mitigation inspection, is a kind of home inspection common in the coastal areas of the Southeastern United States. The purpose of a windstorm inspection is to determine the appropriateness of a given structure's construction in the event of strong winds, such as those present in a hurricane.

Windstorm inspections look for construction features that have been shown to reduce losses in hurricanes, such as a hip roof, concrete block construction, the presence of gable end bracing, shutters and opening protections, the presence of roof to wall attachments such as toe nails, clips or hurricane straps, and the presence of a secondary water resistance barrier.

A homeowner with windstorm insurance can often submit the results of a windstorm inspection to their insurer to obtain discounts on their windstorm insurance. In Florida, for example, premium discounts for certain favorable wind mitigation features are mandated by State law and can total 45% of the original policy's premium. In coastal parts of Texas, the State mandates windstorm inspections prior to certifying a new building.

== Florida wind mitigation ==
In Florida, a wind mitigation inspection is performed by a licensed general contractor, building contractor, architect, engineer, building inspector or home inspector. The information gathered is presented on a standard wind mitigation form, OIR-B1-1802, commonly referred to as the 1802 form. As of Feb 1, 2012, all inspections must have photos showing each feature listed on the wind mitigation form.

The uniform mitigation verification inspection form (commonly referred to as form 1802) created by the Florida Office of Insurance Regulation is divided into 7 sections and is used to verify the presence of windstorm mitigation features on a policyholder's property so the insurer can calculate proper discounts. The form is valid for up to 5 years, provided that no material changes have been made to the structure.

Inspectors will collect the following information during an inspection, the age of the home to determine what building code was in place at the time of construction, the age of the roof, documentation to prove if the roof was installed to any certain building code, the types of roofing materials, the roof deck attachment, roof to wall connection, roof shape, existence of a SWR and the opening protection of the doors and windows.

== See also ==
- Hurricane-proof building
