= Tropical cyclone preparedness =

Planning and actions to deal with a tropical cyclone strike

Hurricane preparedness insignia from the U.S. Health and Human Services Department

Tropical cyclone preparedness encompasses the actions and planning taken before a tropical cyclone strikes to mitigate damage and injury from the storm. Knowledge of tropical cyclone impacts on an area help plan for future possibilities. Tropical cyclones bring destructive high winds, rainfall, and storm surge, posing a severe risk to people and infrastructure in vulnerable areas. Preparedness may involve preparations made by individuals as well as centralized efforts by governments or other organizations. Tracking storms during the tropical cyclone season helps individuals know current threats. Regional Specialized Meteorological Centers and Tropical Cyclone Warning Centers provide current information and forecasts to help individuals make the best decision possible.

== Potential impacts ==
The aftermath of Hurricane Katrina in Gulfport, Mississippi.

Tropical cyclones out at sea cause large waves, heavy rain, flood and high winds, disrupting international shipping and, at times, causing shipwrecks. On land, strong winds can damage or destroy vehicles, buildings, bridges, and other outside objects, turning loose debris into deadly flying projectiles. The storm surge, or the increase in sea level due to the cyclone, is typically the worst effect from landfalling tropical cyclones, historically resulting in 90% of tropical cyclone deaths. The broad rotation of a landfalling tropical cyclone, and vertical wind shear at its periphery, spawns tornadoes. Tornadoes can also be spawned as a result of eyewall mesovortices, which persist until landfall.

Over the past two centuries, tropical cyclones have been responsible for the deaths of about 1.9 million people worldwide. Large areas of standing water caused by flooding lead to infection, as well as contributing to mosquito-borne illnesses. Crowded evacuees in shelters increase the risk of disease propagation. Tropical cyclones significantly interrupt infrastructure, leading to power outages, bridge destruction, and the hampering of reconstruction efforts. On average, the Gulf and east coasts of the United States suffer approximately US$5 billion (1995 US $) in cyclone damage every year. The majority (83%) of tropical cyclone damage is caused by severe hurricanes, category 3 or greater. However, category 3 or greater hurricanes only account for about one-fifth of cyclones that make landfall every year.

Although cyclones take an enormous toll in lives and personal property, they may be important factors in the precipitation regimes of places they impact, as they may bring much-needed precipitation to otherwise dry regions. Tropical cyclones also help maintain the global heat balance by moving warm, moist tropical air to the middle latitudes and polar regions, and by regulating the thermohaline circulation through upwelling. The storm surge and winds of hurricanes may be destructive to human-made structures, but they also stir up the waters of coastal estuaries, which are typically important fish breeding locales. Tropical cyclone destruction spurs redevelopment, greatly increasing local property values.

When hurricanes surge upon shore from the ocean, salt is introduced to many freshwater areas and raises the salinity levels too high for some habitats to withstand. Some are able to cope with the salt and recycle it back into the ocean, but others can not release the extra surface water quickly enough or do not have a large enough freshwater source to replace it. Because of this, some species of plants and vegetation die due to the excess salt. In addition, hurricanes can carry toxins and acids onto shore when they make landfall. The flood water can pick up the toxins from different spills and contaminate the land that it passes over. The toxins are very harmful to the people and animals in the area, as well as the environment around them. The flooding water can also spark many dangerous oil spills.

Recent windstorm activity, in the United States in particular, has focused interest in measures that can be used to lower the likelihood of damage to structures. Billions of dollars of damages have resulted from such strong winds and the manner in which structures have been built in the affected areas in the United States. Some building codes address mitigation measures. For example, the Florida Building Code, specifies the type of nail used to secure roof sheathing. The specification was determined by scientific research conducted by Florida International University's International Hurricane Research Center.

== Individual preparedness ==
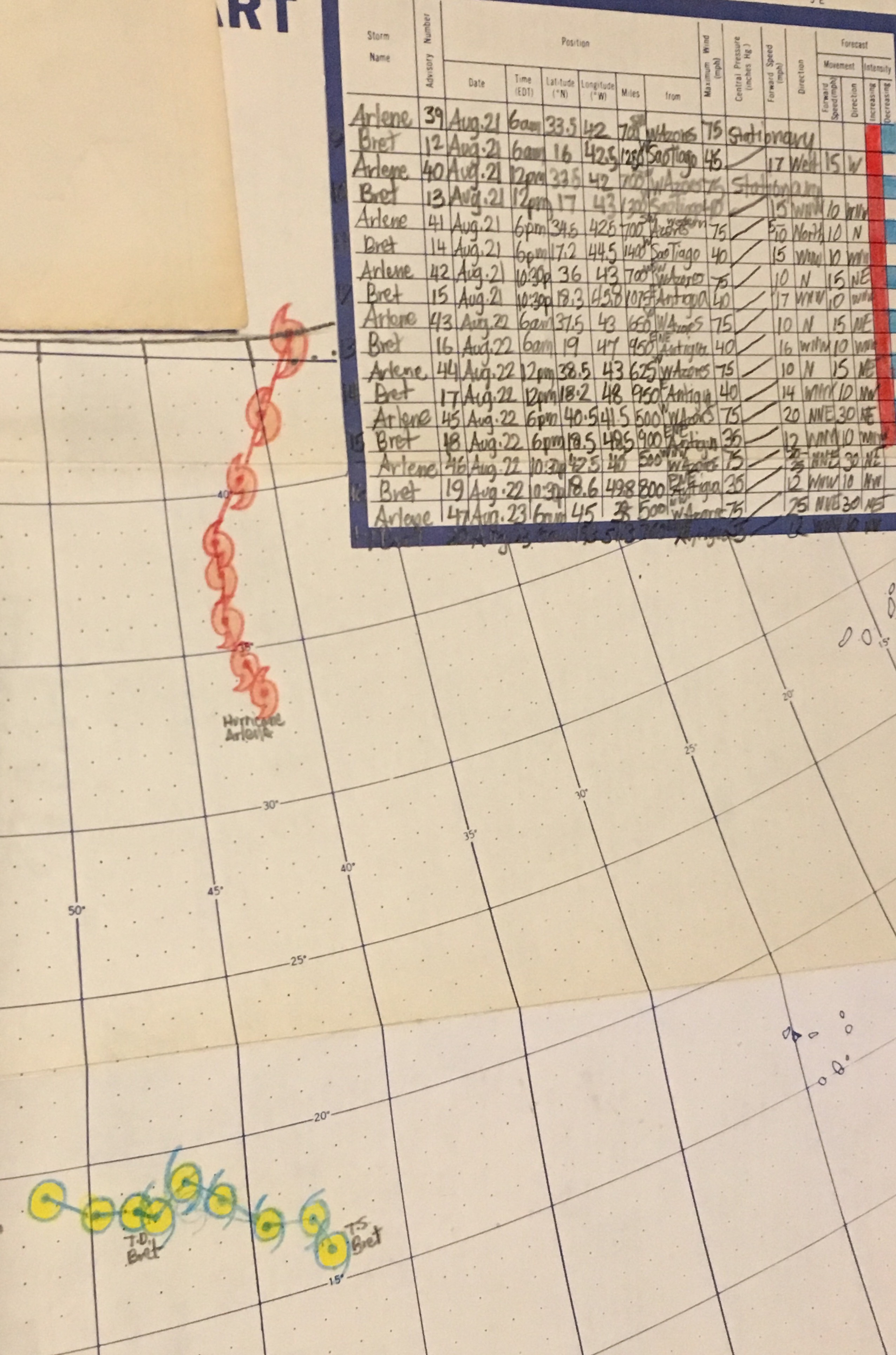
Chart with concurrent information for Hurricane Arlene and Tropical Storm Bret logged and plotted

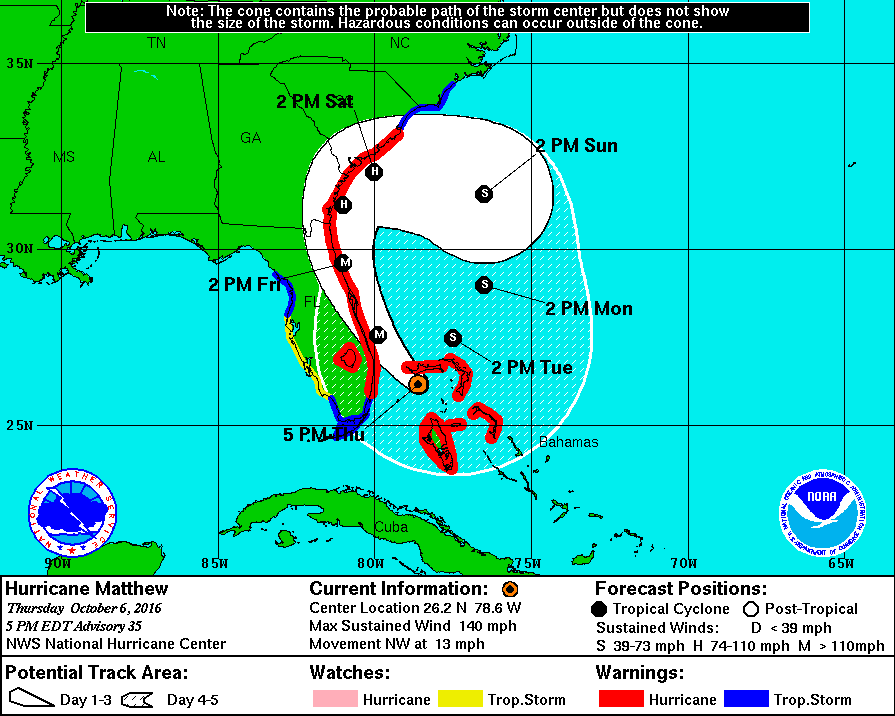
An example of a chart for Matthew showing its five-day forecast track

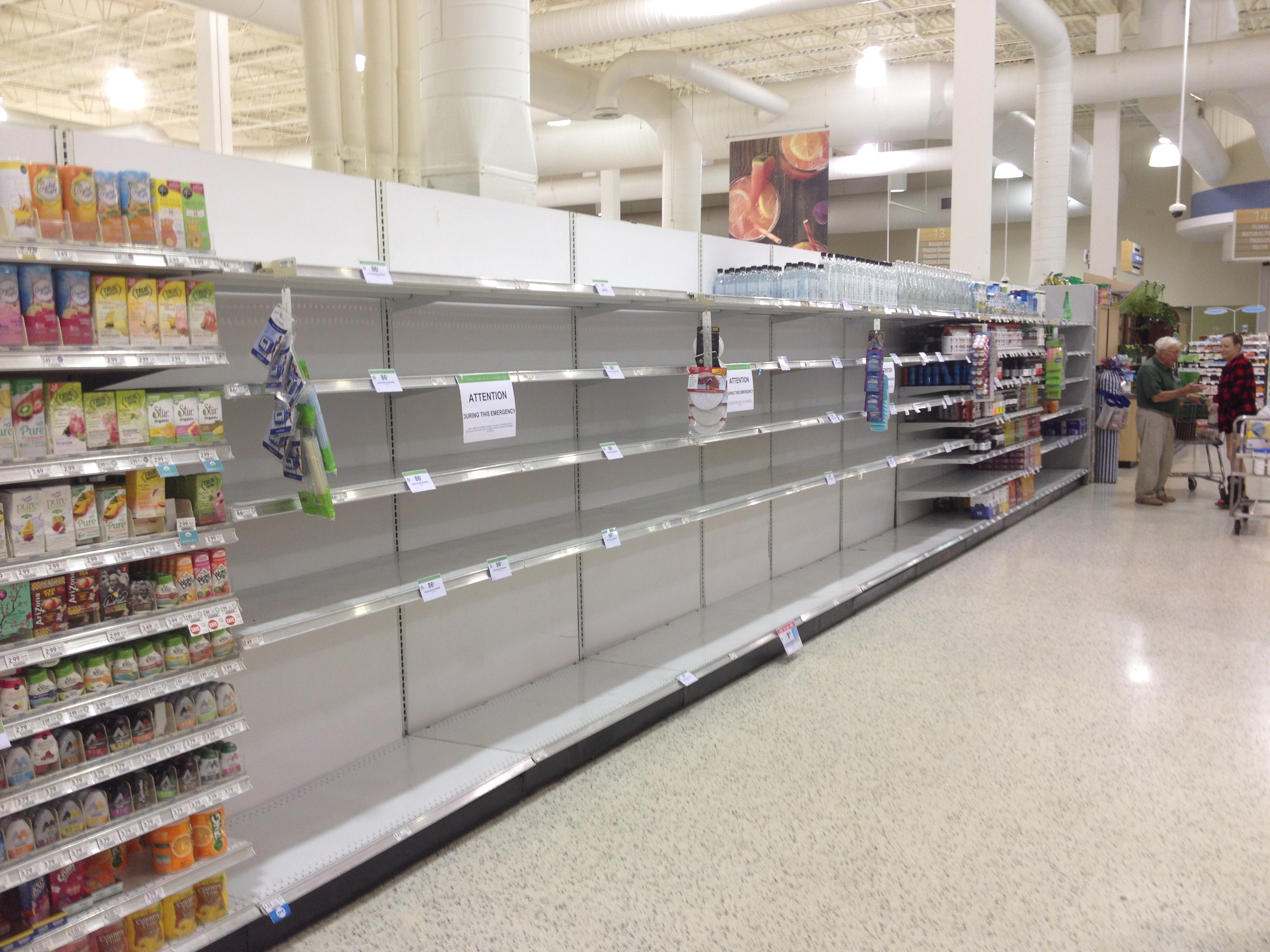
All but the most expensive bottles of water were sold out at this Publix supermarket before Hurricane Irma; in the week preceding the storm, water sold out soon after shipments arrived

An important decision in individual preparedness is determining if and when to evacuate an area that will be affected by a tropical cyclone. Tropical cyclone tracking charts allow people to track ongoing systems to form their own opinions regarding where the storms are going and whether or not they need to prepare for the system being tracked, including possible evacuation. This continues to be encouraged by the National Oceanic and Atmospheric Administration and National Hurricane Center. Some agencies provide track storms in their immediate vicinity, while others cover entire ocean basins. One can choose to track one storm per map, use the map until the table is filled, or use one map per season. Some tracking charts have important contact information in case of an emergency or to locate nearby hurricane shelters. Tracking charts allow tropical cyclones to be better understood by the end user. If evacuation is not possible or necessary, other preparedness actions include storing supplies, securing a home against extreme winds and rain, and making plans with others prior to the storm's landfall.

Hurricane preparedness kits usually include drinkable water, sealed pre-prepared meals MRE, first-aid kits, prescription medications in sealed containers, waterproof battery-powered or hand-crank-powered flashlights and radios, a whistle or other sound-signaling device, a multi-tool with a knife, identification and medical cards, any necessary medical records, waterproof bags or portable waterproof containers, and other supplies helpful to a survival situation. If your pets will be with you make sure you include canned or dry food for them as well (any dry food included should be rotated every 2 months). You should also include veterinarian records and proof of vaccinations for all of your pets.

Preparedness also may include having discussed evacuation plans and routes, and informing others of those plans before a disaster occurs.

Evacuation to hurricane shelters is an option of last resort. Shelter space is first-come, first-served and only intended preserve human life. Buildings designated as shelters in Florida are required to only have been constructed to meet minimum code requirements applicable at the time of design. Some shelters are expected to protect occupants from wind and water but are not expected to provide food, water, sanitation, or bedding.

Based on preparedness of the people in a region, the preparedness level was greatly affected by the salary, race, age, etc. Many people are not prepared for the worst-case scenario, but they should be. Being prepared for a huge disaster is what will ultimately save your life if worse comes to worst.

Hospitals are needed to be prepared in advance for huge natural disasters. Nurses are in high demand when people are in trouble. They need to be prepared for ready for any situation that enters the hospital. After hurricanes such as Katrina and Rita, nurses are needed to be fully capable of any possible scenario.

== Home retrofitting ==
An important decision a homeowner should make is to locate the building outside of range from the coast that is exposed to storm surge. Regardless of protection from the effects of wind, a building can be flooded or destroyed by storm surge waters.

To mitigate the effects of high winds and associated debris impact, the home can be examined out by an experienced hurricane mitigation professional. Many hurricane protection companies offer free consultations as part of their marketing strategy. The State of Florida has taken steps to help its homeowners in the area of hurricane preparedness through its My Safe Florida Home grant program. Qualified homeowners receive a free in-home assessment of their home's hurricane readiness. The state matches funds spent by the homeowner, up to a $5,000 limit.

When making these types of home improvements, there are two major areas of focus: the roof and the openings.

Homes may be retrofitted to withstand the extreme conditions of a tropical cyclone. Common modifications include reinforcing gabled roofs, applying additional adhesives to roof shingles, installing hurricane straps and clips to ensure the roof stays in place despite high winds. Hurricane resistant shutters, as well as impact resistant glass may help keep windows closed from driving rain, despite flying debris. Contrary to a common misconception, taping windows with masking or duct tape does not impact whether they will break.

External patio and pool screen enclosures are especially vulnerable during a hurricane. A homeowner who anticipates sustained winds greater than 100 mph may use a razor knife taped to a telescopic pole to cut down the screens from the enclosure's skeleton structure. This will prevent the screens from acting as a sail and pulling down the entire enclosure structure.

Reinforcing garage doors and entry doors is also common practice for hurricane preparing a home. Garage doors may be protected by fabric screens, made of a strong woven fabric, to keep out projectiles and to reinforce the door.

The goal of these mitigation measures and products is to decrease the likelihood of severe damage to a home. There is no guarantee that these measures will safeguard any home against any kind of storm and the projectiles that may come with a storm, but a well-protected home is far more likely to come through a hurricane in better shape than a home that has little or no protection.

== Organized preparation ==
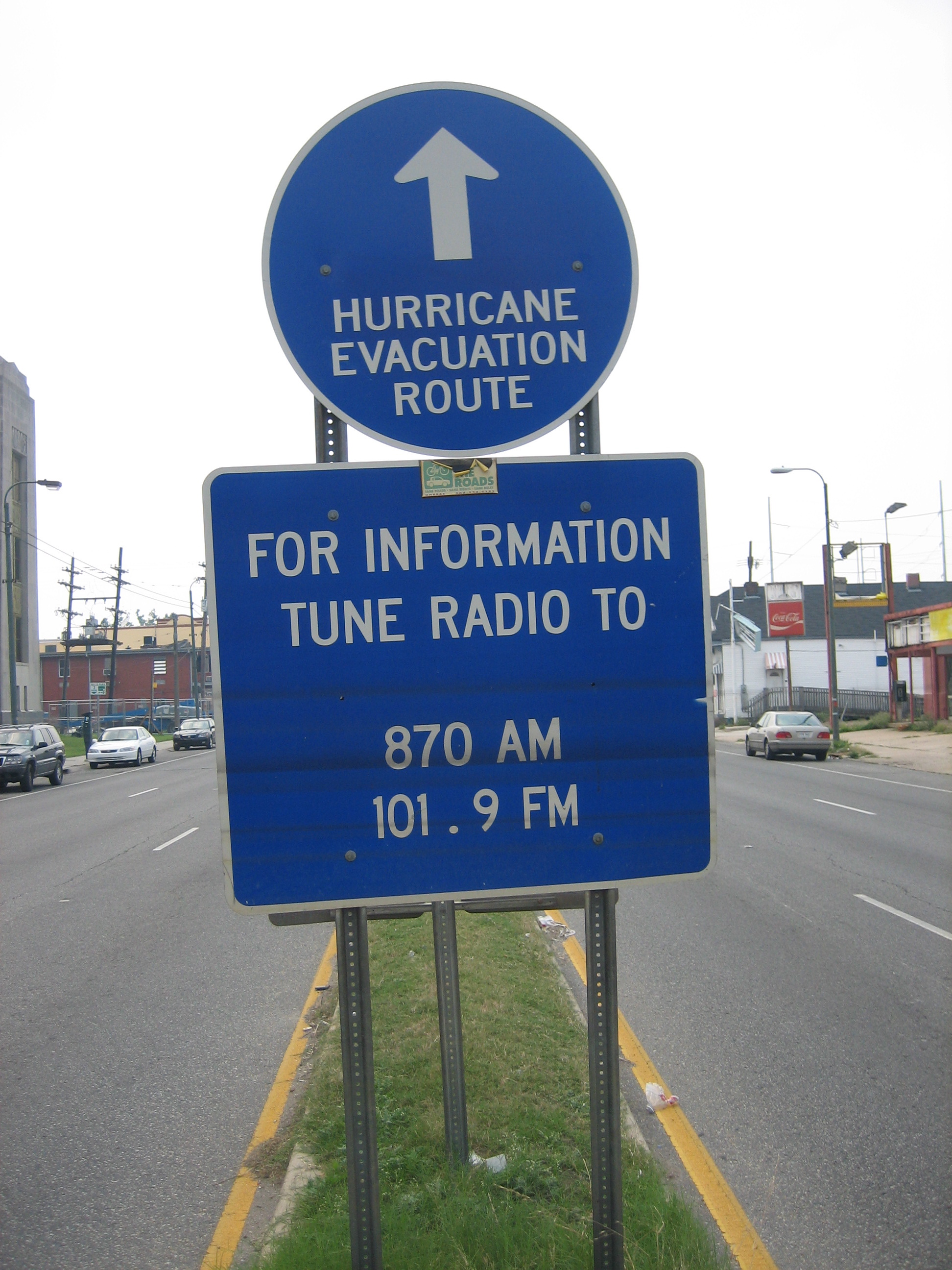
Evacuation route sign on Tulane Avenue in New Orleans shows lines from long standing floodwaters after Hurricane Katrina

Hurricane mitigation uses policies to make buildings and other infrastructure more resistant to the effects of tropical cyclones. In addition to facilities themselves being at risk, the internal contents of the structures can be damaged as result of exposure to water if the building envelope is breached, usually as a result of the strong winds associated with hurricanes and tropical storms. Although the negative pressure caused by high velocity wind flowing over a building roof can cause the roof to fail with the building envelope intact, broken windows allow the air pressure to rise inside a building, creating an even greater pressure difference, and increasing the likelihood of roof failure. This pressure increase results after an opening, that is, a window or door, is breached after being struck and broken by wind blown debris.

See also

- Nationwide Wireless Priority Service on wireless telephone networks.
- Government Emergency Telecommunications Service on the public switched telephone network, land line telephone service.
- Fort Lauderdale-Hollywood International Airport | Hurricane Preparedness Manual, year 2014

== Test facilities ==
There is no single test standard or facility capable of qualifying the protection of an entire building. The Cyclone Testing Station in Australia can test building systems (e.g., roofs, exterior cladding), and indirectly test entire small buildings with structural loading to simulate wind pressures. In the United States, the test facilities at the FM Global Research Campus includes both direct wind testing of roof components to speeds up to 160 mph (260 km/h), and roof uplift simulation using suction tables per industry standards.

== Hurricane simulator ==
University of Florida's team led by Forrest Masters developed "the world's most powerful portable hurricane simulator, a giant machine capable of reproducing winds in excess of 120 mph (190 km/h) and recreating rain." It consists of eight large fans driven by four diesel engines, with a 5,000-gallon (19,000 litre) water tank to keep the engines cooled. The university is currently designing water-resistant windows, wind-proof tiles and altogether stronger structures.

This machine was used in the MythBusters 2009 season to test the myth that it's better to leave the windows open during a hurricane than closed (the myth was declared Busted).

== See also ==
- Automated Tropical Cyclone Forecasting System – Software used to predict and track tropical cyclones
- Emergency preparedness – Dealing with all humanitarian aspects of emergencies
- Hurricane shutter – Temporary building reinforcement
- Hurricane-proof building – Method for building to survive against strong winds
- Insurance – Protection from financial loss
- NOAA Weather Radio – Weather radio network in the United States
- Standby generator – Type of generator
- Storm – Disturbed state of an astronomical body's atmosphere
- Tropical cyclone – Rapidly rotating storm system
- Wind – Natural movement of air or other gases relative to a planet's surface
