= Club Row, Longridge =

Row of houses in Lancashire, England

Club Row
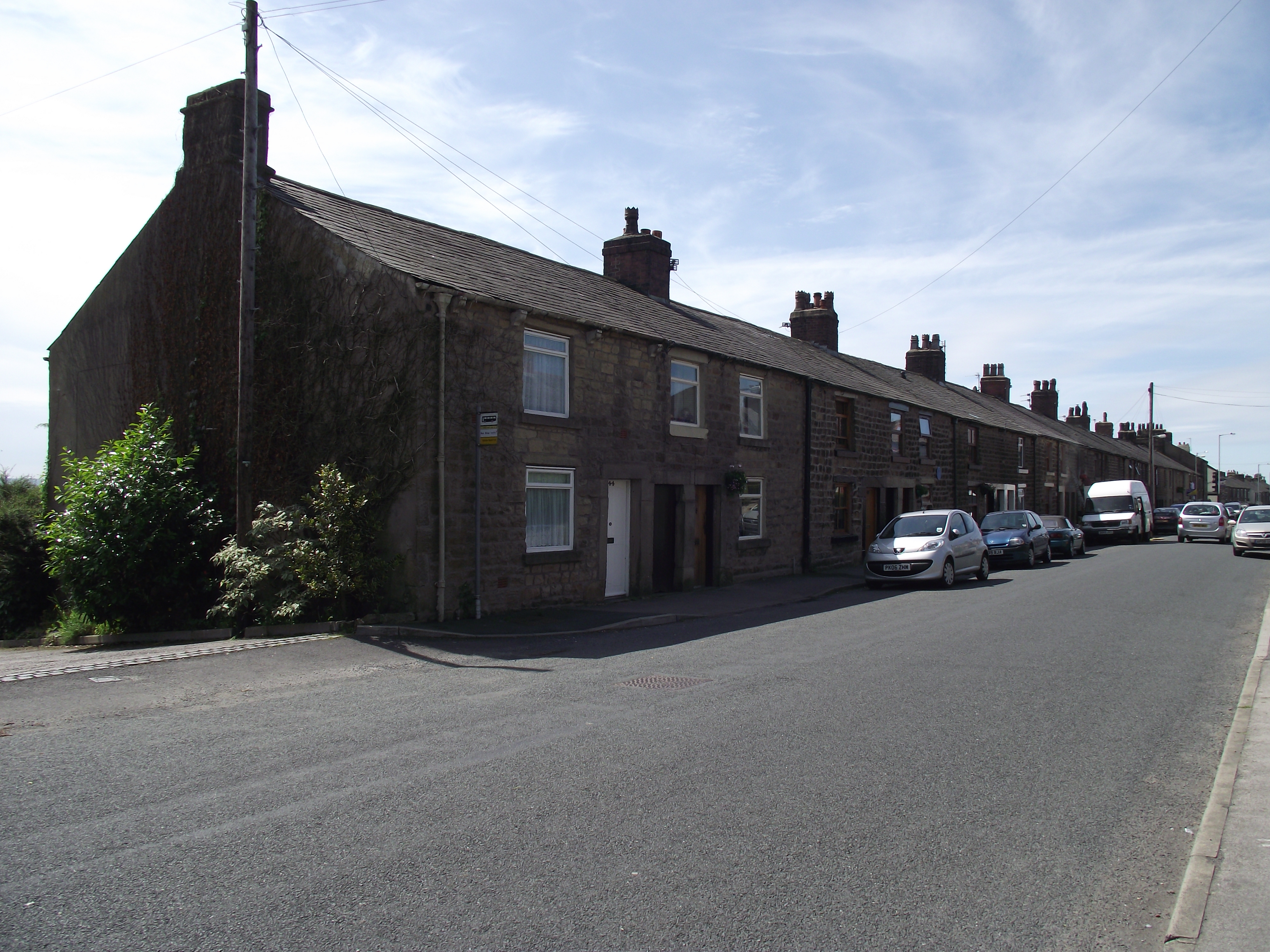
- The buildings in 2007, looking southwest

- Location within Lancashire
- 53.83114°N 2.59676°W
- Location: 6–44 Higher Road; Longridge, Lancashire, England

History
- Built: 1793; 233 years ago

Site notes
- Area: Ribble Valley

Listed Building – Grade II
- Designated: 16 August 1983
- Reference no.: 1308531

Club Row is a row of sandstone terraced houses on Higher Road in the English market town of Longridge, Lancashire, built between 1793 and 1804. Grade II listed, and numbered 6 to 44, they each have slate roofs and were built by the Longridge Building Club, one of the earliest terminating building societies in England. They have two storeys and cellars entered at the rear, and each house has one bay. The windows and doorways have plain surrounds. The doorways are grouped in threes, the centre door leading to the rear yard. The cellars were used for handloom weaving.

== Popular culture ==
The row is mentioned in Barry Durham's book The Legend of Arthur King and Other Tales of the Supernatural as the residence of British seaman George Hewitt.

== See also ==
- Listed buildings in Longridge
