= Birdsmouth joint =

Notch cut in rafter to rest on wall and distribute roof weight

A birds-mouth joint in a rafter, set upon a double top plate. Shown are the two cuts of the joint: the seat cut and the heel cut.

In light frame construction, a birdsmouth joint or bird's beak cut is a woodworking joint that is generally used to connect a roof rafter to the top plate of a supporting wall. It is an indentation cut into the rafter which consists of a "seat cut" (the face of which rests on the top plate) and a "heel cut" or "plumb cut" (the face of which lies parallel to the supporting wall), forming a shape resembling a bird's mouth. The indentation should not extend unsupported on the interior in order to maintain the structural integrity of the rafter because the unsupported section can split along the grain of the wood. The joint is generally fastened with nails by toenailing the rafter from the side into the top plate below.

The depth of a rafter cut varies according to local building code differences in different locations. As a general rule, no more than one third of the depth of the rafter should be removed, in order to maintain structural integrity.
