= Remote visual inspection =

Remote Visual Inspection or Remote Digital Video Inspection, also known as RVI or RDVI, is a form of visual inspection which uses visual aids including video technology to allow an inspector to look at objects and materials from a distance because the objects are inaccessible or are in dangerous environments. RVI is also a specialty branch of nondestructive testing (NDT).

== Purposes ==
Technologies include, but not limited to, rigid or flexible borescopes, videoscopes, fiberscopes, push cameras, pan/tilt/zoom cameras and robotic crawlers. Remote are commonly used where distance, angle of view and limited lighting may impair direct visual examination or where access is limited by time, financial constraints or atmospheric hazards.

RVI/RDVI is commonly used as a predictive maintenance or regularly scheduled maintenance tool to assess the "health" and operability of fixed and portable assets. RVI/RDVI enables greater inspection coverage, inspection repeatability and data comparison.

The "remote" portion of RVI/RDVI refers to the characterization of the operator not entering the inspection area due to physical size constraints or potential safety issues related to the inspection environment. In some cases, remote inspection also involves a human capturing data on-site using cameras or sensors, with analysis performed by an expert or AI system at a different location. This approach enhances efficiency by allowing specialists to review and assess inspection data without being physically present at the asset.

== Applications ==
Typical applications for RVI include:

- Aircraft engines (turbofan, turbojet, turboshaft)
- Aircraft fuselage
- Turbines for power generation (steam and gas)
- Process piping (oil and gas, pharmaceutical, food preparation)
- Nuclear Power Stations - contaminated areas
- Any areas where it is too dangerous, small or costly to view directly
