= Pre-purchase inspection =

A pre-purchase inspection is an independent, third-party professional service that evaluates a vehicle’s condition before a purchase offer is made. Consumer protection organizations such as the Federal Trade Commission, the American Bar Association, insurance companies, and states recommend an independent pre-purchase inspection. The prospective buyer hires a qualified evaluator who examines the target vehicle for defects, hidden damage, maintenance history, and safety, then typically provides a written evaluation report. The service results in factual information that the prospective buyer uses as decision support for the vehicle purchase. Unless the vehicle is unsafe to drive, the evaluator does not provide a purchase recommendation.

== Components of the pre-purchase inspection ==
The focus of a pre-purchase inspection is to gather factual information on the vehicle's current condition. Typically, the evaluator is a mobile inspector who inspects the vehicle at its sale point. A short road test is usually included. Inspections are performed with the permission of the seller. The buyer can be present or not present during the inspection.

The inspected areas include structural integrity, safety features, electrical and electronic systems, powertrain, suspension, fuel system, emissions, steering, comfort system (heat/air), security system, exhaust, interior, wheels and rims, and apparent state of general maintenance. Hidden damage from crashes, flood, or rough use are checked. Important for newer vehicles is an inspection of the onboard computer system, including recently cleared computer codes. The inspector also investigates for vehicle identification alteration, lack of recent license plates, salvage title, and odometer fraud. Commercial vehicle inspections also evaluate the condition of items relevant to commercial use, such as conspicuity materials, markings and placards, insurance, service limits, coupling devices, etc.

== Qualifications of a pre-purchase inspector ==
The pre-purchase inspector specializes in gathering, evaluating, and interpreting results of a detailed automotive examination. The evaluator is usually a specialist in the vehicle type, such as personal automobiles or commercial heavy transports. They have professional training in the vehicle type's optimal safety, structural, and performance features. For commercial transports, evaluators should be qualified inspectors under the Federal Motor Carrier Safety Administration (FMCSA) Part 396 or state laws. State inspection credentials may be required in some states. For personal non-commercial automobiles, evaluators should have both broad and deep automotive experience plus certified training from both car manufacturers and the Automotive Service Excellence (ASE) Master Technician program. In California, evaluators should be certified by California Air Resources Board (CARB) and Bureau of Automotive Repairs (BAR). All evaluators should have detailed knowledge of state and federal regulations, safety recalls, service campaigns, and technical service bulletins (TSB). Evaluators should not be employees of the seller or in a position to profit from the results of the sale (see ethical considerations in this article).

== Ethical considerations of pre-purchase inspections ==
The decision to purchase an automobile or commercial transport incurs both financial investment and a deep concern for human safety. Independence from ethical entanglements with vehicle sellers is critical. Independence assures the prospective buyer that the results of the pre-purchase inspection are solely concerned with finding of fact in the prospective buyer's interest. Evaluators who stand to gain from the vehicle transaction must disclaim their entanglement in writing so the prospective buyer has complete information. All experienced pre-purchase inspectors have built professional networks and a knowledge base within their industry, and this knowledge supports a factual inspection. However, knowing the name and reputation of a seller versus being in a position to gain from that seller's contracts are ethically not the same.

Prospective buyers should ask for a written conflict of interest (COI) disclaimer of any ethical entanglements of the pre-purchase evaluator. An oral disclaimer of independence is insufficient.

A conflict of interest disclaimer at a minimum should include statements on:

- employment relationships (for-hire, referral fee, barter, etc.) with any vehicle dealer, broker, maintenance facility, or independent seller
- personal relationships (family, personal networks) with any vehicle dealer, broker, maintenance facility, or independent seller
- whether the inspector offers independent repairs, maintenance, or vehicle sales

Reports issued by the evaluator should not contain advertising, marketing hyperlinks, or persuasive text. Prospective buyers' personally identifiable information (PII) should not be sold as a marketing lead. Evaluators should offer the buyer anonymity when requested.

== Difference between state vehicle inspectors and independent pre-purchase vehicle inspectors ==
States that require roadworthiness and emissions testing as a requirement of continued licensing also require that inspectors be certified and/or licensed by the State. Those mandatory states require a minimum training level for state inspectors who typically work at fixed inspection stations. For independent pre-purchase inspectors, sometimes called 'for-hire' inspectors, states vary on licensing requirements. The presence or absence of a state license is not a guarantee of a thorough and factual pre-purchase evaluation. Rather, the defining characteristic of pre-purchase vehicle evaluators is deep automotive experience that is useful to prospective buyers. Commercial vehicle inspectors must meet applicable state and federal regulations.
