= Toenailing =

Carpentry technique

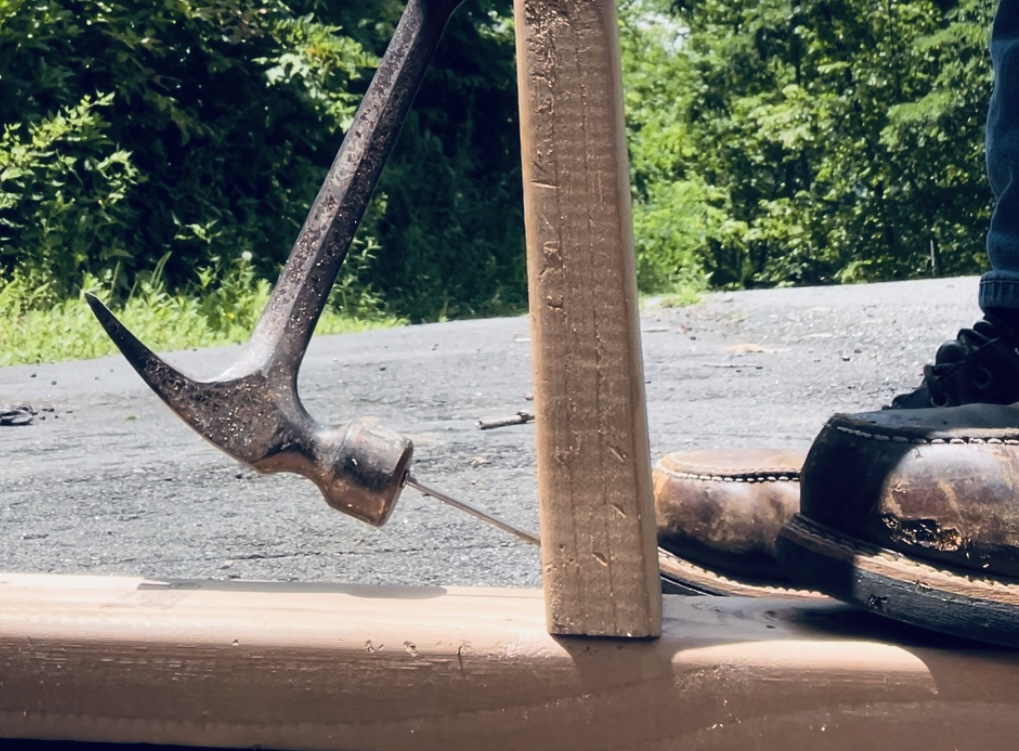
Example of toenailing in stud framing

Toenailing or skew-nailing is a viable, structurally sound method of driving a nail at a roughly 30° angle to fasten two pieces of wood together, typically with their grains perpendicular. The term comes colloquially from fastening wood at the bottom, or toe, of the board. A variation of toenailing is to use screws, casually known as "toe-screwing". Toenails are typically driven in opposing pairs when possible, or pairs of pairs when appropriate. The angled nailing makes later dismantling difficult or destructive.

== History ==
The word toenailing has been used in carpentry since at least 1949.

== Common applications ==
- Fastening a wall stud to a sole plate in stud framing.
- Used in place of end nailing when fastening locations are not easily accessible, like installing blocking between studs and joists.
- Attaching a rafter to the top plate of a wall at its birdsmouth.
- Commonly used with screws in carpentry to quickly secure temporary framing or work aids such as a jig.
- Can be used by woodworkers, for example a drawer or box can be glued and skew-nailed with finer nails or panel pins. Skew nailing will fasten the joint, while the glue sets, avoiding the use of clamps.

Alternatives to toenailing include the use of joist hangers, hurricane ties, and other engineered steel connectors designed to drive nails on a perpendicular to a wood surface.
