= Commercial Vehicle Safety Alliance =

North American non-profit association

- Legal status: Non-profit
- Purpose: Improve safety through commercial motor vehicle inspections
- Region served: U.S., Canada and Mexico
- President: Julius Debuschewitz
- Main organ: Executive Committee
- Website: http://www.cvsa.org/

The Commercial Vehicle Safety Alliance (CVSA) is a non-profit association of local, state, provincial, territorial and federal commercial motor vehicle safety officials and industry representatives. CVSA focuses on improving driver and vehicle safety by providing guidance to organizations that enforce commercial motor vehicle inspections and certify inspectors, and reports over 4,000 members in the United States, Canada and Mexico.

== History ==
The Alliance began informally in 1980 as several western state agencies and Canadian provinces that were focused on commercial motor vehicle enforcement met to find ways to make standards, procedures and methods more effective. Early work led to the development of a memorandum of understanding (MOU), which developed uniform standards related to commercial vehicle highway safety. The MOU was adopted by seven U.S. states and two Canadian provinces in what was known as the Western States Commercial Vehicle Safety Alliance.

In October 1982, increased interest in the organization led to the drafting and ratification of bylaws to create an international scope, and accommodate associate memberships. This established the framework for commercial vehicle safety and enforcement in North America.

The 1982 Surface Transportation Assistance Act established funding for state motor carrier enforcement programs and, in August 1984, a North American standard for safety was created by combining the work of CVSA with that of the Motor Carrier Safety Assistance Program (MCSAP).

In 1985, an executive director position was created and a centralized office was established in Washington, D.C.

In 1988, the alliance started its Operation Roadcheck 72 hour roadside inspection, an event that has been held annually every year since.

In 1991, the alliance expanded beyond the United States and Canada to include Mexico.

In 1998, the organization started its Brake Safety Week in Canada, which then spread to the United States as an annual event.

In June 2000, Mexico participated in CVSA's Roadcheck 2000 program, inspecting Mexican trucks along federal highways, putting 246 out of service.

During the Alliance's 2016 International Roadcheck, inspectors performed 62,796 inspections and took 9,080 trucks and 1,436 drivers out of service. Brakes and driving hours were the top violations.

In 2021, the group reported that its International Roadcheck inspected 40,000 vehicles, and found 85.3% were in compliance.

In 2022, the group began holding human trafficking awareness events in the United States, Canada and Mexico.

== Membership types ==
CVSA has four membership types: state/provincial, local agencies, associate and federal, referenced by class types.

- Class I Members are state/provincial agencies represented by various departments of transportation, public utility and service commissions, state police, highway patrols, departments of motor vehicles and ministries of transport.
- Class II Local Members are local agencies represented by city or municipal police departments.
- Class III Associate Members are companies, organizations, trade associations, trucking and bus companies, industry suppliers and vendors, training institutions, consultants, insurance companies, state or provincial trucking associations, and large and small fleet owners or owner operators.
- Class IV Federal Members are federal government agency representatives.
