= Tie (engineering) =

Linear structural component designed to resist tension

A hurricane tie used to fasten a rafter to a stud

A tie, strap, tie rod, eyebar, guy-wire, suspension cables, or wire ropes, are examples of linear structural components designed to resist tension. It is the opposite of a strut or column, which is designed to resist compression. Ties may be made of any tension resisting material.

== Application in wood construction ==
In wood-frame construction ties are generally made of galvanized steel. Wood framing ties generally have holes allowing them to be fastened to the wood structure by nails or screws. The number and type of nails are specific to the tie and its use. The manufacturer generally specifies information as to the connection method for each of their products. Among the most common wood framing ties used is the hurricane tie or seismic tie used in the framing of wooden structures where wind uplift or seismic overturning is a concern.

=== Hurricane tie ===
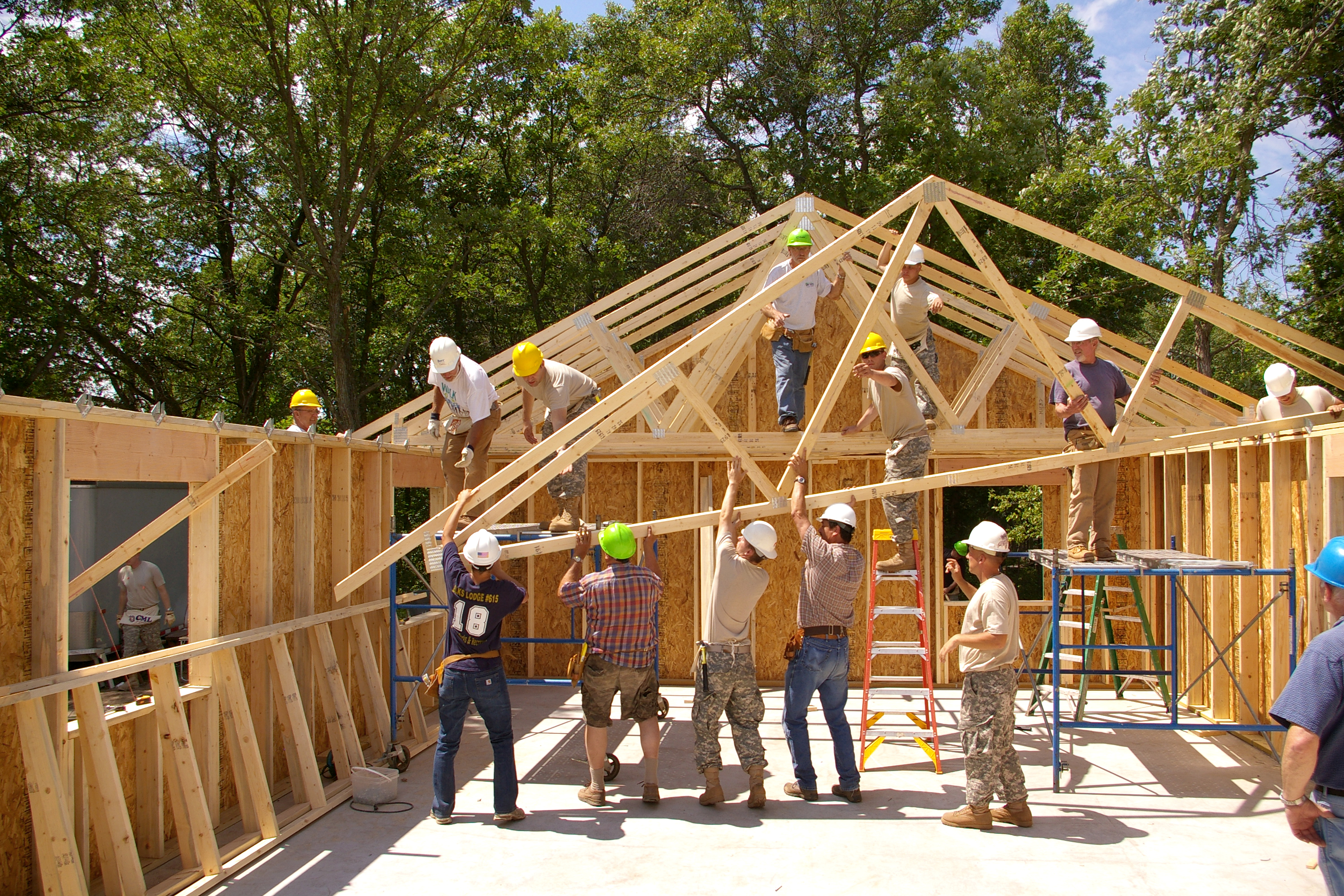
Hurricane ties are in place at the top of the wall as the roof trusses are being placed.

A hurricane tie (also known as hurricane clip or strip) is used to help make a structure (specifically wooden structures) more resistant to high winds (such as in hurricanes), resisting uplift, racking, overturning, and sliding. Each of the crucial connections in a structure, that would otherwise fail under the pressures of high winds, have a corresponding type of tie, generally made of galvanized or stainless steel, and intended to resist hurricane-force and other strong winds.

"Hurricane clip" has two meanings in building construction:

- A connecting tie that provides a continuous structural load transfer path from the top of a building to its foundation, helping to protect buildings from damage resulting from high wind. These devices are primarily used in areas affected by high winds including hurricanes but are generally suitable for any area that may be impacted by windstorm damage. They are also known as hurricane ties or strips;
- A tie which is attached to roof tiles to keep them from blowing off a roof. These devices are also known as wind clips and hurricane side clips.

=== Seismic tie ===
Seismic ties are used to securely fix cabinets, bookcases, desks, appliances, machinery & equipment to walls and/or floors to constrain their movement during earthquakes.

=== Girder tiedown ===
Top mount, face mount, sloped/skewed, and variable pitch hangers for dimensional lumber, engineered wood I-joists, structural composite lumber and masonry wall. To give added strength in increase various load requirements over wood only.

=== Joist hanger or corner bracket ===
Joist hangers are used to prevent floor joists, which is what supports the flooring systems in residential homes and buildings built using lumber, from dropping and twisting thus creating an uneven walking surface. This is known as floor sagging. When laying wooden subfloor, adhesive should be applied to the joists which the subfloor will lay on to help prevent creaking & lateral movement and separation of the joists and subfloor. Using screws instead of nails is also highly recommended to prevent the aforementioned creaking and other problems as well. Subfloor isn't load bearing in residential construction. Although the use of steel joist hangers to support floor joists is recommended over a ledger (a horizontal brace) supporting the joists because of house settling and nail separation, they are not required by code in most municipalities. However, toe nailing and end nailing is nowhere near as effective as using hangers to support flooring systems.

=== Twist strap ===
Twist straps provide a tension connection between two wood members. They resist uplift at the heel of a truss economically. When the strengthening is being done from the inside, the ideal connector to use is one that connects rafters or trusses directly to wall studs. This can only be done where the rafter or trusses are immediately above or immediately to the side of studs below. In that case a twist strap connector can be used.

=== Floor span connector ===
A connector for connecting wall studs of two adjacent floors in a light frame building structure, the connector having a first attachment tab, a seat member, a diagonally slanted support leg, and a second attachment tab, all substantially planar. The connector is intended to be paired and the paired connectors joined by an elongated tie member that pierces the sill plates of the intervening floor structure.

=== Angle tie ===
Sometimes referred to as an angle brace. The Angle tie is used to prevent displacement of building elements due to thrust. A brace/tie across an interior angle of a wooden frame, forming the hypotenuse and securing the two side pieces together.

=== Z-clip ===
Similar to a French cleat, a Z-Clip allows for the installation of wall panels without screwing into the front of the panels. The clips provide a secure mount for wall panels, partitions, frames, cabinets, and more. Once installed, clips wedge together to lock panels in place. To disengage panels, simply lift and remove.

=== Plate ===
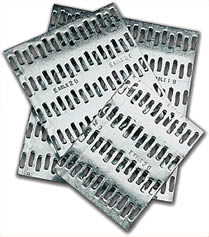
Metal connector plates

=== Rafter tie (and tie-beams) ===
Rafter ties are designed to tie together the bottoms of opposing rafters on a roof, to resist the outward thrust where the roof meets the house ceiling and walls. This helps keep walls from spreading due to the weight of the roof and anything on it, notably wet snow. In many or most homes, the ceiling joists also serve as the rafter ties. When the walls spread, the roof ridge will sag. A sagging ridge is one clue that the home may lack adequate rafter ties. Rafter ties form the bottom chord of a simple triangular roof truss. They resist the out-thrust of a triangle that's trying to flatten under the roof's own weight or snow load. They are placed in the bottom one-third of the roof height. Rafter ties are always required unless the roof has a structural (self-supporting) ridge, or is built using engineered trusses. A lack of rafter ties is a serious structural issue in a conventionally-framed roof.

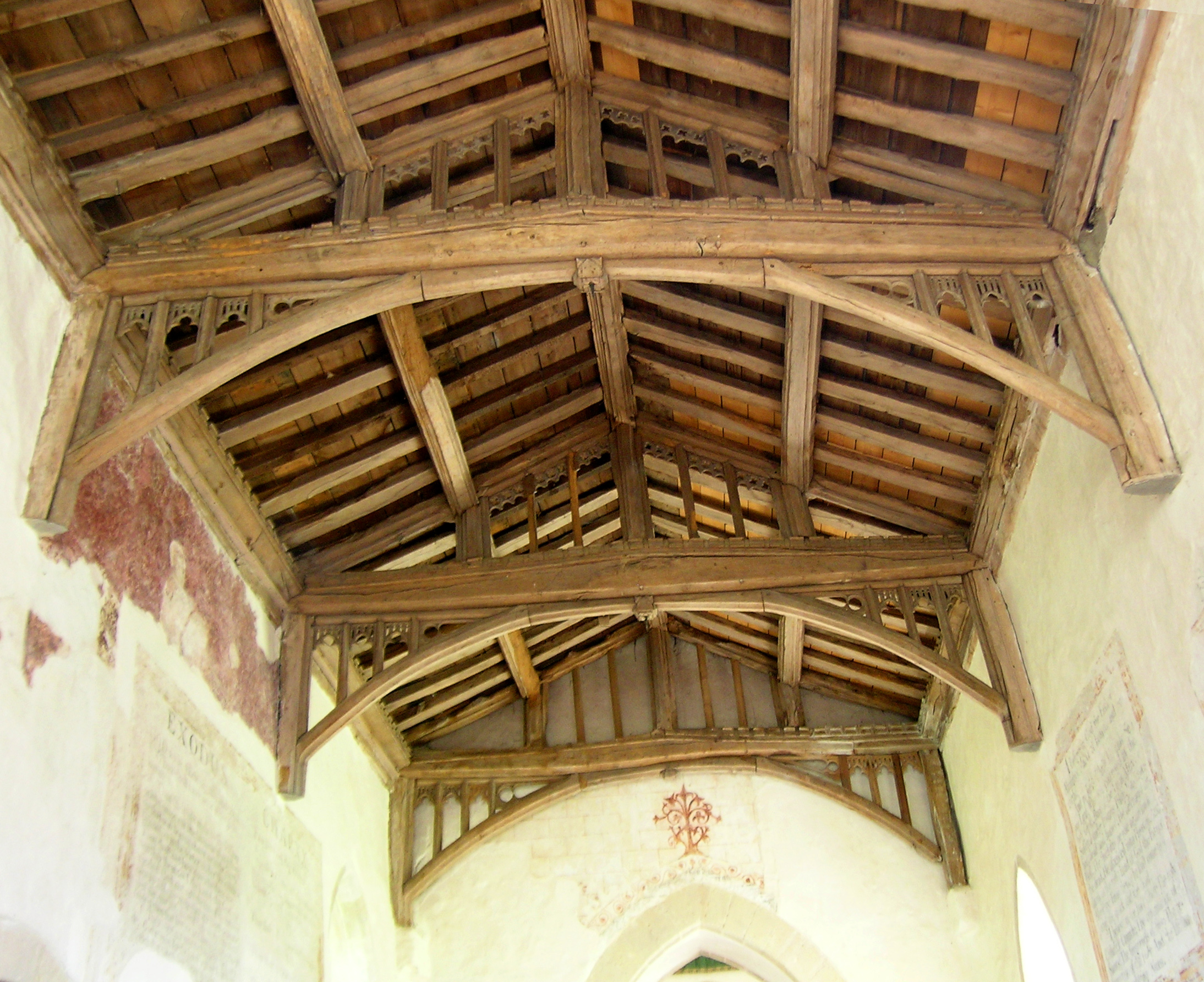
The 15th-century tie-beam roof at St Mary's Church, Radnage, Buckinghamshire in England

A wooden beam serving this purpose is known as a tie-beam, and a roof incorporating tie-beams is known as a tie-beam roof.

== See also ==
- Framing (construction)
- Timber framing
- List of structural elements
- Tie rod
