= Bubble Houses =

Bubble Houses may refer to:

- Bubble Houses (Hobe Sound, Florida)
- Bubble Houses (Litchfield Park, Arizona)
- Palais Bulles (Bubble Palace or Bubble House), a large house in Théoule-sur-Mer, France
