= Michael Moore (disambiguation) =

Michael Moore is an American filmmaker and author.

Michael Moore may also refer to:

== Academia ==
- Michael G. Moore (fl. 1970s–2020s), American professor of education
- Michael S. Moore (academic) (fl. 1960s–2020s), American law professor
- Michael Moore (herbalist) (1941–2009), author, founder of the SW School of Botanical Medicine and expert on medicinal plants
- Michael Moore (physicist) (born 1943), professor of theoretical physics since 1976 at the University of Manchester
- Michael Moore (provost) (c. 1639–1723), Irish priest, philosopher and educationalist

== Entertainment ==
- Mickey Moore or Michael D. Moore (1914–2013), Canadian-born American film director and child actor
- Michael Moore (bassist) (born 1945), American bassist
- Michael Moore (saxophonist and clarinetist) (born 1954), American musician
- Michael S. Moore (comics) (born 1974), American comic book writer
- Michael Moore (actor) (1925–1998), American film actor

== Politics ==
- Michael Moore (Maryland politician) (died 1903), American politician
- Mike Moore (New Zealand politician) (1949–2020), prime minister of New Zealand and director-general of the World Trade Organization
- Michael W. Moore (born 1948), former secretary of the Florida Department of Corrections
- Michael Moore (Australian politician) (born 1950), former member of the Australian Capital Territory Legislative Assembly
- Mike Moore (American politician) (born 1952), former Mississippi attorney-general, known for his involvement with early tobacco litigation
- Michael Moore (Scottish politician) (born 1965), Liberal Democrat politician in the UK, former secretary of state for Scotland
- Michael J. Moore (born 1968), former state senator and United States Attorney for the Middle District of Georgia
- Michael Moore (Australian judge) (fl. 1990s–2000s), former Federal Court of Australia justice
- Michael O. Moore (born 1963), Massachusetts senator from Millbury, Massachusetts, representing the Second Worcester District
- K. Michael Moore (born 1951), American federal judge

== Sports ==
=== Baseball ===
- Harry Moore (baseball) or Mike Moore (1876–1917), Negro leagues baseball player
- Mike Moore (baseball) (born 1959), Major League Baseball player
- Mike Moore (baseball executive) (fl. 1960s–2000s), Minor League Baseball president

=== Football ===
- Mick Moore (footballer) (born 1952), English footballer
- Mike Moore (running back) (1956–2016), college football player
- Michael Moore (offensive lineman) (born 1976), former American football guard
- Michael Moore (footballer) (born 1981), Scottish football player
- Mike Moore (tight end) (born c. 1957), American football tight end 1975-1977
- Mike Moore (American football coach) (fl. 1980s–2010s), American football coach
- Mike Moore (Canadian football) (born 1993), Canadian football player
- Michael Moore (Cork Gaelic footballer), played in the 1890 All-Ireland Senior Football Championship final
- Michael Moore (Galway Gaelic footballer), from the All-Ireland SFC finals of 1963, 1964 and 1965

=== Other sports ===
- Mike Moore (wrestler) (born 1958), former WCW professional wrestler
- Michael Moore (rowing) (born 1970), American Olympic rower
- Mikki Moore (born 1975), NBA player for the Golden State Warriors
- Mike Moore (ice hockey) (born 1984), ice hockey player
- Mike Moore (basketball) (born 1994), American basketball player
- Michael Moore (sprinter), winner of the 1982 NCAA Division I outdoor 4 × 400 meter relay championship

== Other people ==
- Michael Moore (Swedish officer) (born 1953), major-general in Swedish Air Force, and expert at Swedish Department of Defense
- Michael Scott Moore (born 1969), American journalist and novelist
- Michael D. Moore (evangelist) (fl. 1980s–2020s), pastor of the Faith Chapel Christian Center in Birmingham, Alabama
- Michel Moore (born 1960), chief of Los Angeles Police Department
- Mick Moore (political economist), British economist

== See also ==
- Mikey Moore (born 2007), English football winger
