= Bubble Houses (Hobe Sound, Florida) =

Two historic bubble or airform houses in Hobe Sound, Martin County, Florida

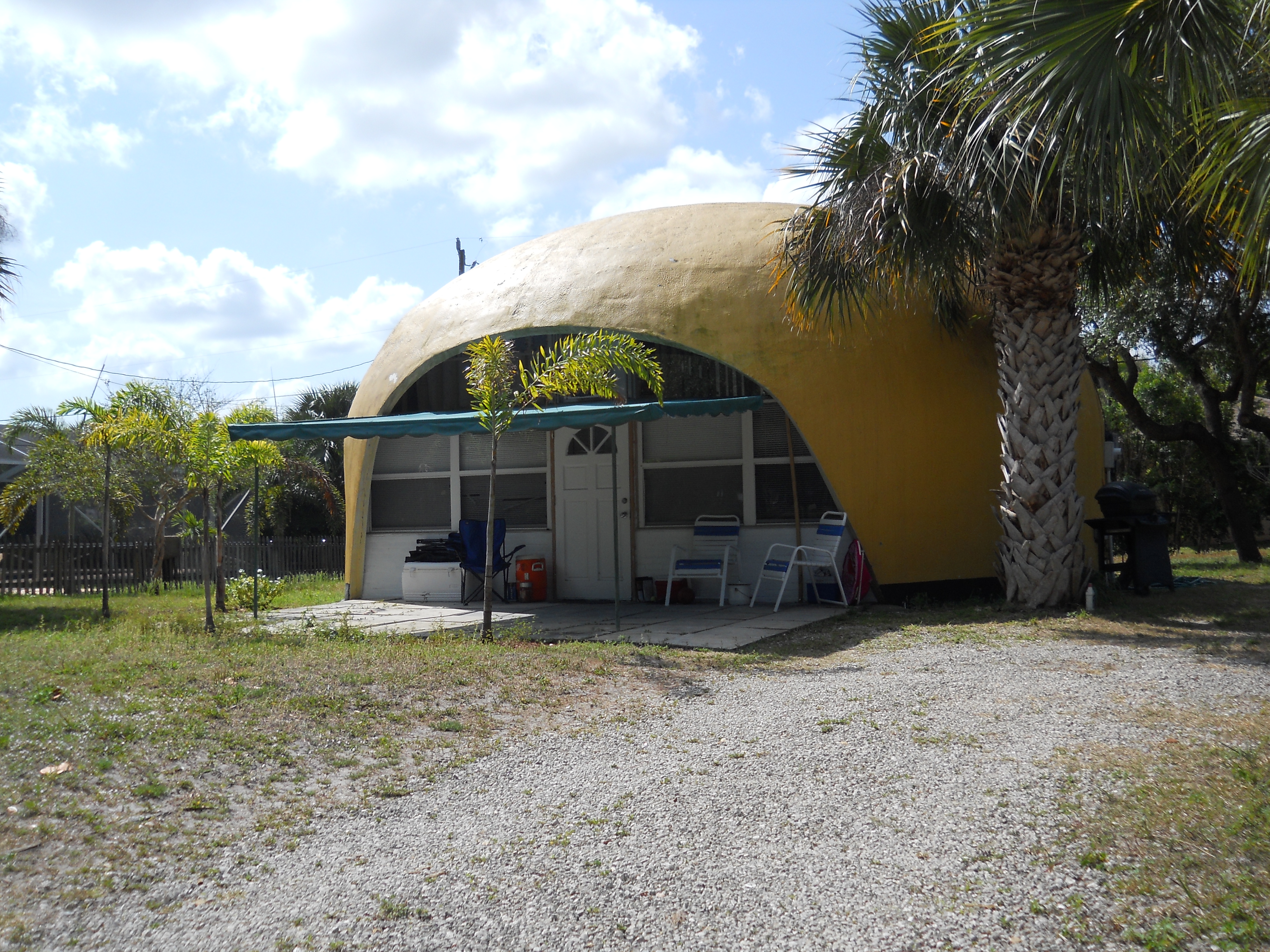
- The yellow Bubble House
- Interactive map of the Bubble Houses area

General information
- Architectural style: Modernist
- Location: 9086 & 9096 SE Venus Street, Hobe Sound, Florida, United States
- Coordinates: 27.0564°N 80.1318°W
- Construction started: 1954
- Completed: 1954
- Cost: $6,500
- Client: Joseph Verner Reed of Jupiter Island, Florida

Technical details
- Structural system: Monolithic dome
- Size: 569 square feet (52.9 m^{2}) base footage

Design and construction
- Architect: Eliot Noyes

The Bubble Houses are two historic bubble or airform houses located next to each other at 9086 and 9096 Southeast Venus Street in the Zeus Park neighborhood of Hobe Sound, Martin County, Florida.

== History ==
Completed in 1954 by Airform, the Bubble Houses were designed by Eliot Noyes using the airform monolithic dome system developed by Wallace Neff, which consists of reinforced concrete cast in place over an inflated balloon to establish the house's shape.

The original interiors of the houses consisted of a bathroom and open concept living, dining, and kitchen area on the 569 square feet (52.9 m^{2}) main floor, with a loft-style, raised sleeping space above.

They were built to sell for $6,500 Shortly after their completion, it was stated that more than 3,000 people had toured the newly constructed bubble houses. The nearby Olympia School even closed early one afternoon so that its students could tour the Bubble Houses.

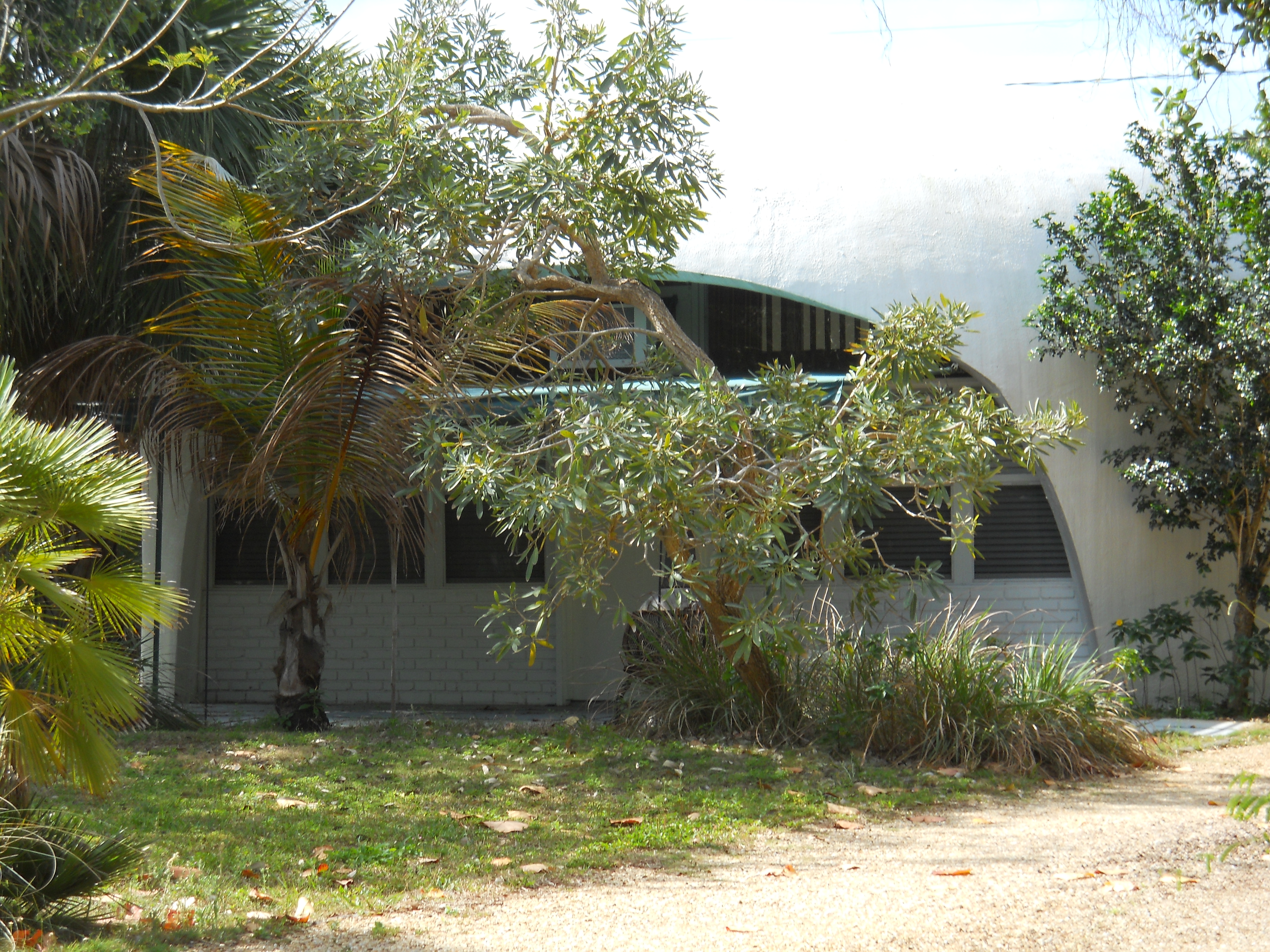
The white Bubble House

== Status ==
The easternmost of the two bubble houses, painted yellow, received media attention in March 2012 because of its owner's proposal to replace it with a larger house. The historic structure was demolished to allow for the construction of the new house. (This was the easternmost bubble house located at 9096 SE Venus Street, Hobe Sound, Florida.)

The only remaining bubble house is still standing, with the current owners intending to keep it in place.

The westernmost bubble house, 9086 SE Venus Street, has received little or no attention in the media, although both houses were featured in a 2008 Inside Hobe Sound Tour sponsored by the local chamber of commerce.

The bubble house is located on a five plus acre park. It is one mile from local beaches, and two miles from the residences of Celine Dion, Greg Norman and Tiger Woods.

== Media coverage ==
The two bubble houses were featured in Life magazine in its February 22, 1954, issue, which described them as "both hurricane-proof and bugproof". They were featured in a chapter of the 2011 book by Jeffrey Head, No Nails, No Lumber: The Bubble Houses of Wallace Neff published by Princeton Architectural Press.

== See also ==
- Bubble Houses (Litchfield Park, Arizona)
- Blobitecture – architecture in which buildings have an organic, amoeba-shaped, form.
- Hurricane-proof building
