= Villa Giulia =

Villa in Rome, Italy

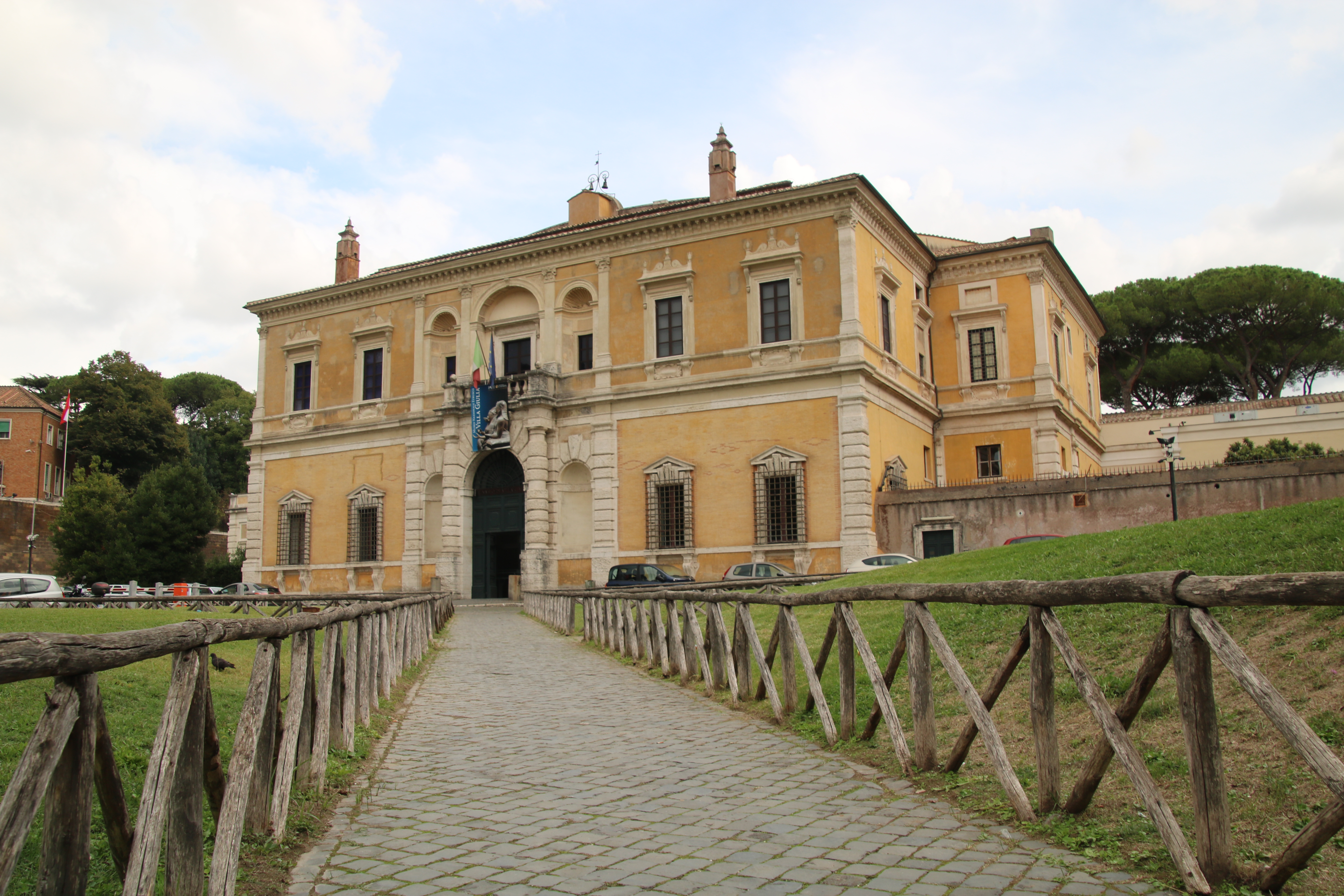
- Renaissance façade by Jacopo Barozzi da Vignola
- Click on the map for a fullscreen view

General information
- Type: villa
- Architectural style: Renaissance/Mannerist
- Location: piazzale di Villa Giulia 9, Rome, Italy
- Coordinates: 41°55′06″N 12°28′40″E
- Construction started: 1551
- Estimated completion: 1553
- Client: Pope Julius III

Design and construction
- Architects: Giacomo Barozzi da Vignola, Bartolomeo Ammanati, Giorgio Vasari

The Villa Giulia is a villa in Rome, Italy. It is named after Pope Julius III, who had it built in 1551–1553 on what was then the edge of the city. Today it is publicly owned, and houses the Museo Nazionale Etrusco, a collection of Etruscan art and artifacts.

== History ==
=== Location ===
The villa was built in an area of Rome known as the 'Vigna Vecchia' (which was once against the city walls), lying on the slopes of Monte Parioli, as a 'Villa Suburbana' and a place of repose.

=== Design ===
The pope, a highly literate connoisseur of the arts, assigned the initial design of the building to Giacomo Barozzi da Vignola in 1551–1553. The nymphaeum and other garden structures, however, were designed by Bartolomeo Ammanati, all under the supervision of Giorgio Vasari. Michelangelo also worked there. Pope Julius took a direct interest in the villa's design and decor and spent vast amounts of money on enhancing its beauties. Villa Giulia became one of the most delicate examples of Mannerist architecture.

Only a small part of the original property has survived intact, comprising three vineyards which extended down to the Tiber, and to which the pope traveled often by boat. The villa, as was customary, had an urban entrance (on the Roman Via Flaminia) and a formal but rural garden entrance. The villa itself was on the threshold between two worlds, that of the city and that of the country, an essentially Roman concept. A medal struck in 1935 shows the villa as substantially complete, but with a pair of cupolas which were never executed.

Vignola's urban front of the building is a somber two-story facade with each story being given equal value. It has at its centre the triple rhythm of a richly detailed rusticated triumphal arch flanked by symmetrical wings of two bays only. The facade is terminated at each end by Doric pilasters. In this facade of the Villa Giulia is the genesis of the seven-bay 18th century Georgian villa, which was reproduced as far away as the Tidewater region of Virginia.

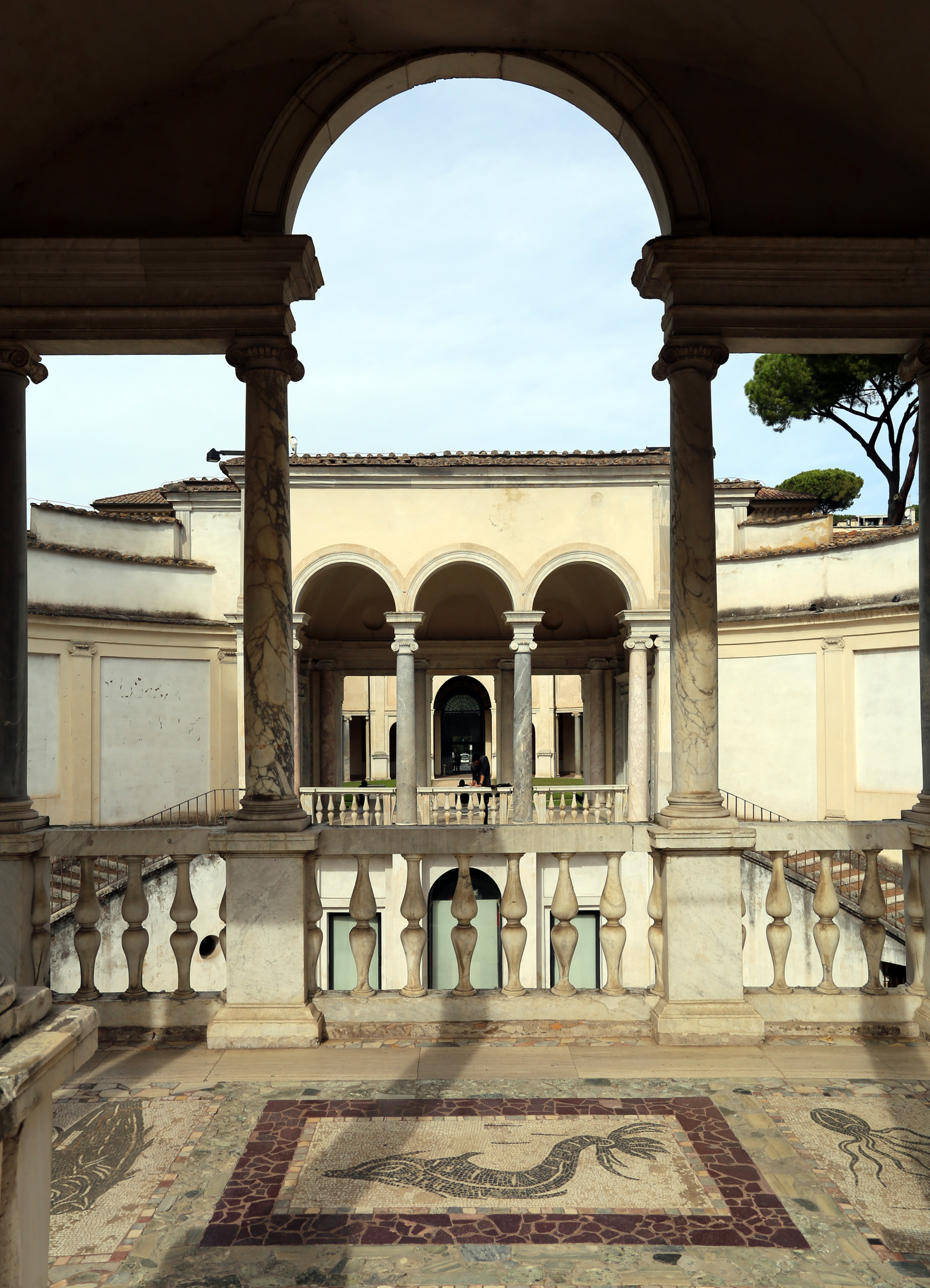
View of the nimphaeum loggias

The rear of the building has Vignola's large hemispherical loggia overlooking the first of three courtyards, laid out as a simple parterre.

At its rear, the visitor passes through the casina, which again has a hemispherical rear facade, enclosing paired flights of re-entrant marble steps that give access to the heart of the villa complex: a two-story Nympheum for alfresco dining during the heat of the summer. This three-levelled structure of covered loggias, decorated with marble statuary, reclining river gods in niches, and balustrading, is constructed around a central fountain. Here in this cool environment, sheltered from the blazing sun, day-long picnics would be held. The central fountain, Fontana dell'Acqua Vergine, was designed and sculpted by Vasari and Ammannati: it depicts river gods and caryatids. The fountain's source, the Acqua Vergine, also supplies the Trevi Fountain in Rome.

The Casino della Vigna ("little house in the vineyard"), as it was sometimes known, and its gardens were set in the midst of vineyards, which could be viewed from shaded arcades on the outsides of the garden walls. Papal parties embarked on boats at the gates of the Vatican and were transported up the Tiber to the villa's long-gone private landing stage.

=== Later history ===
Following Pope Julius' death, his successor Pope Paul IV confiscated all the properties he had assembled; the villa was divided, and the main building and part of the gardens became the property of the Camera apostolica. The Villa was reserved for the use of the new pope's Borromeo nephews. It was restored in 1769 on the initiative of Pope Clement XIV, confiscated by the new state of Italy in 1870, and given over to the National Etruscan Museum in the early 20th century.

== In popular culture ==
In the third season of Medici, it is the site of the first meeting between Clarice Orsini, wife of Lorenzo Medici, and Caterina Sforza's wife of Girolamo Riario, that takes place in what would appear to be the palace of a fictitious “Cardinal Bianco.” The meeting scene is filmed in the courtyard of the hemicycle of Villa Giulia in Rome (now home to the National Etruscan Museum).

== Gallery ==
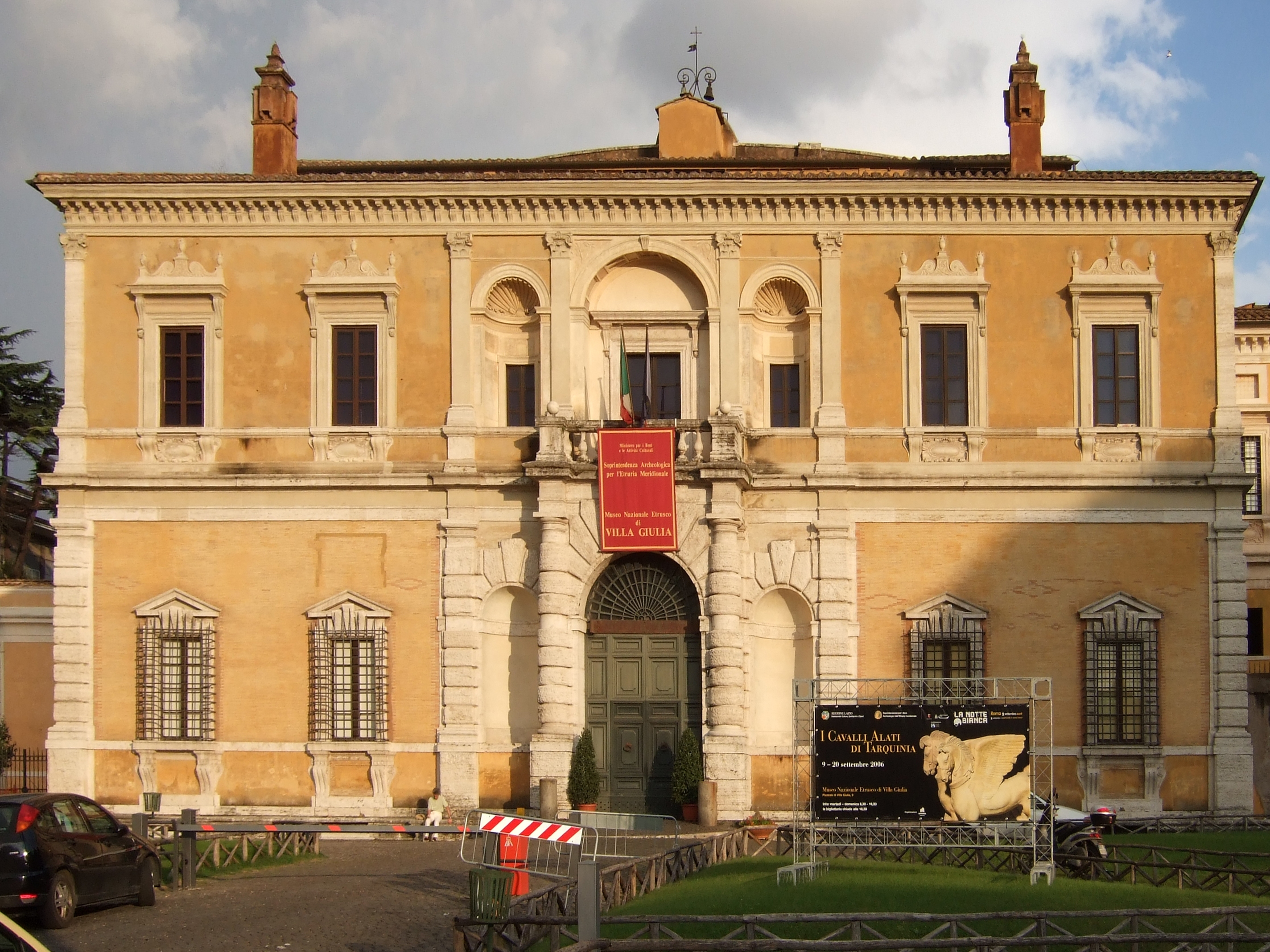
Villa Giulia façade, Giorgio Vasari

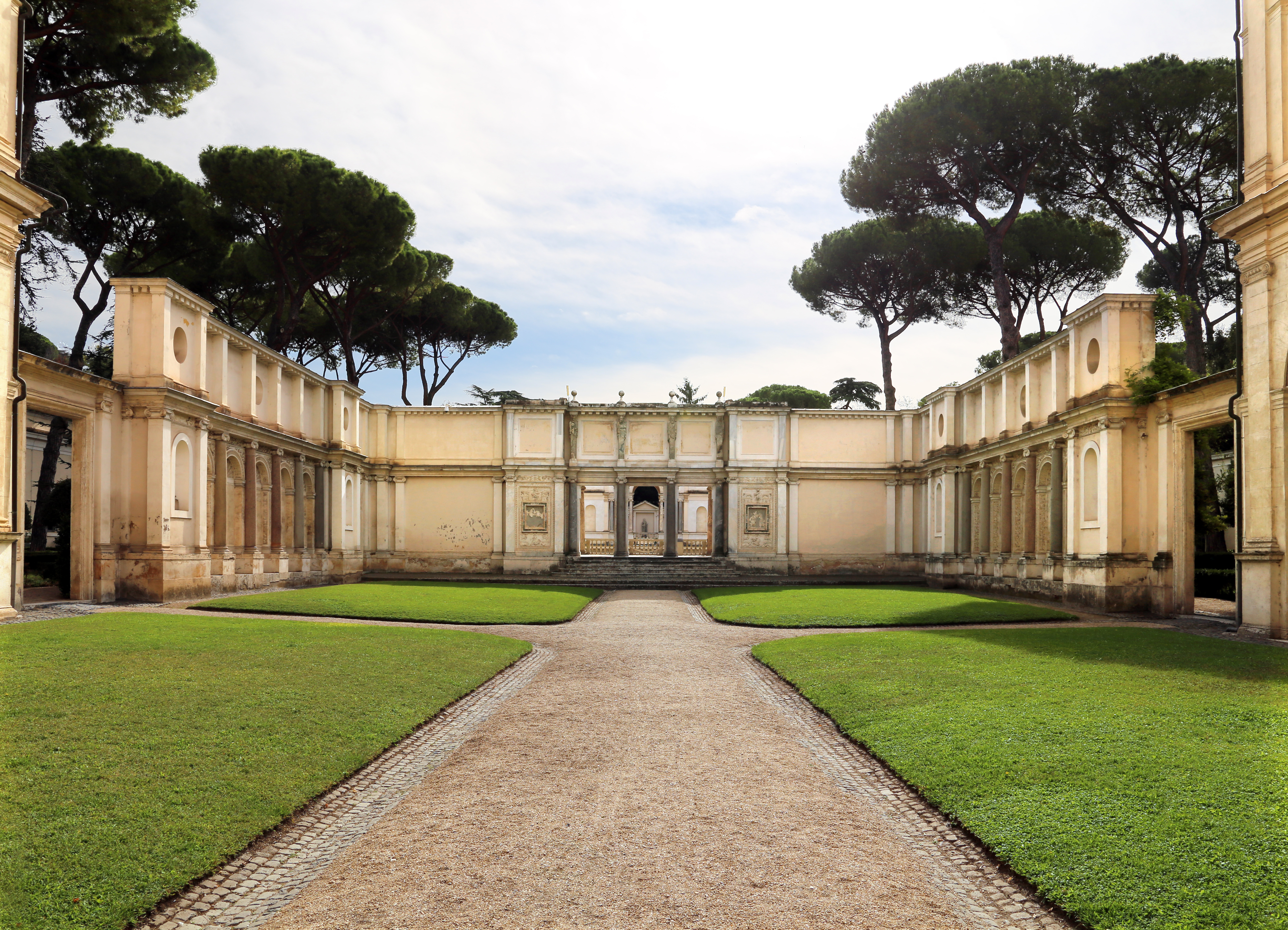
Villa Giulia court, Giorgio Vasari

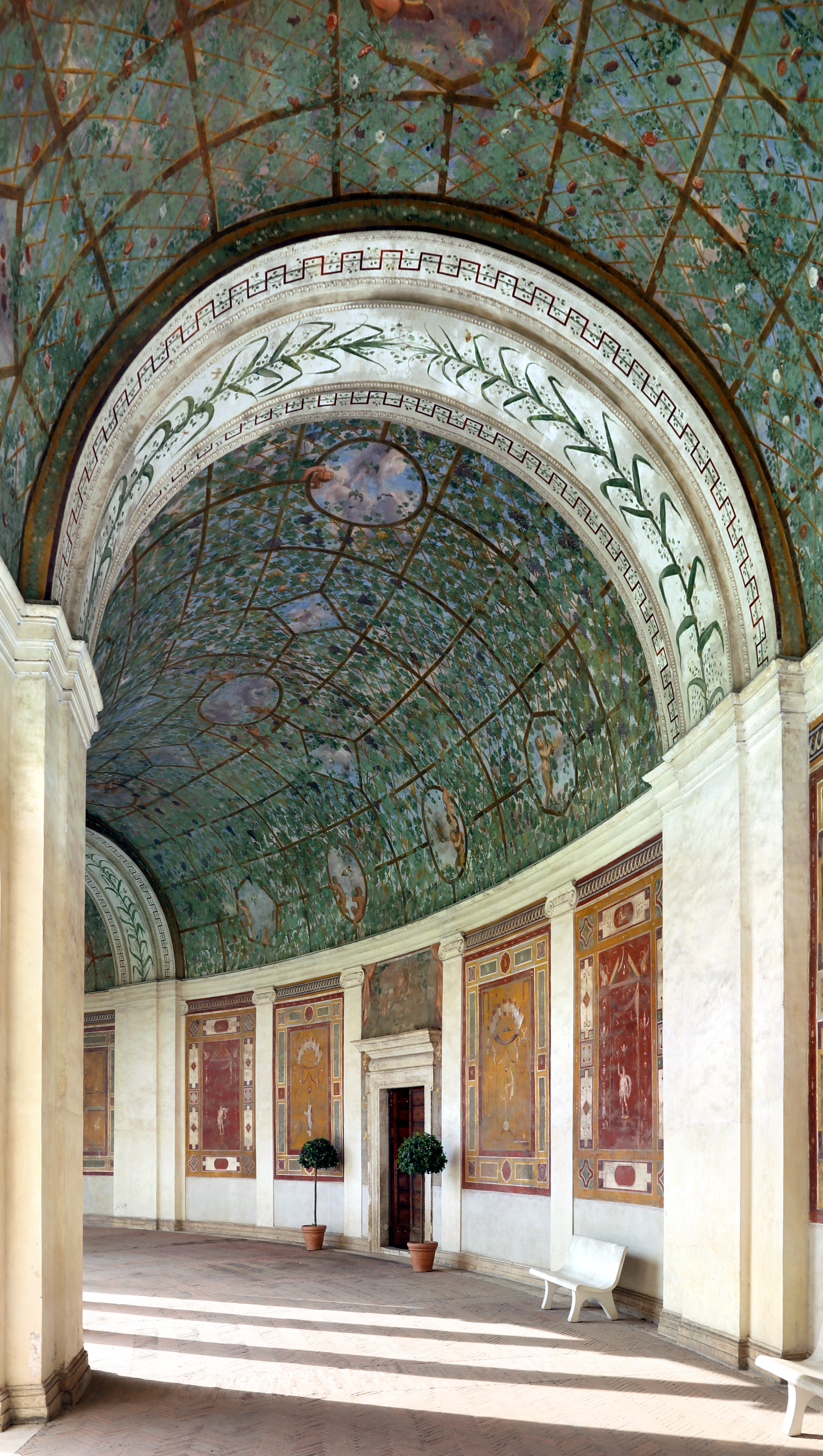
Semicircular portico at the rear of the Casino, Vignola

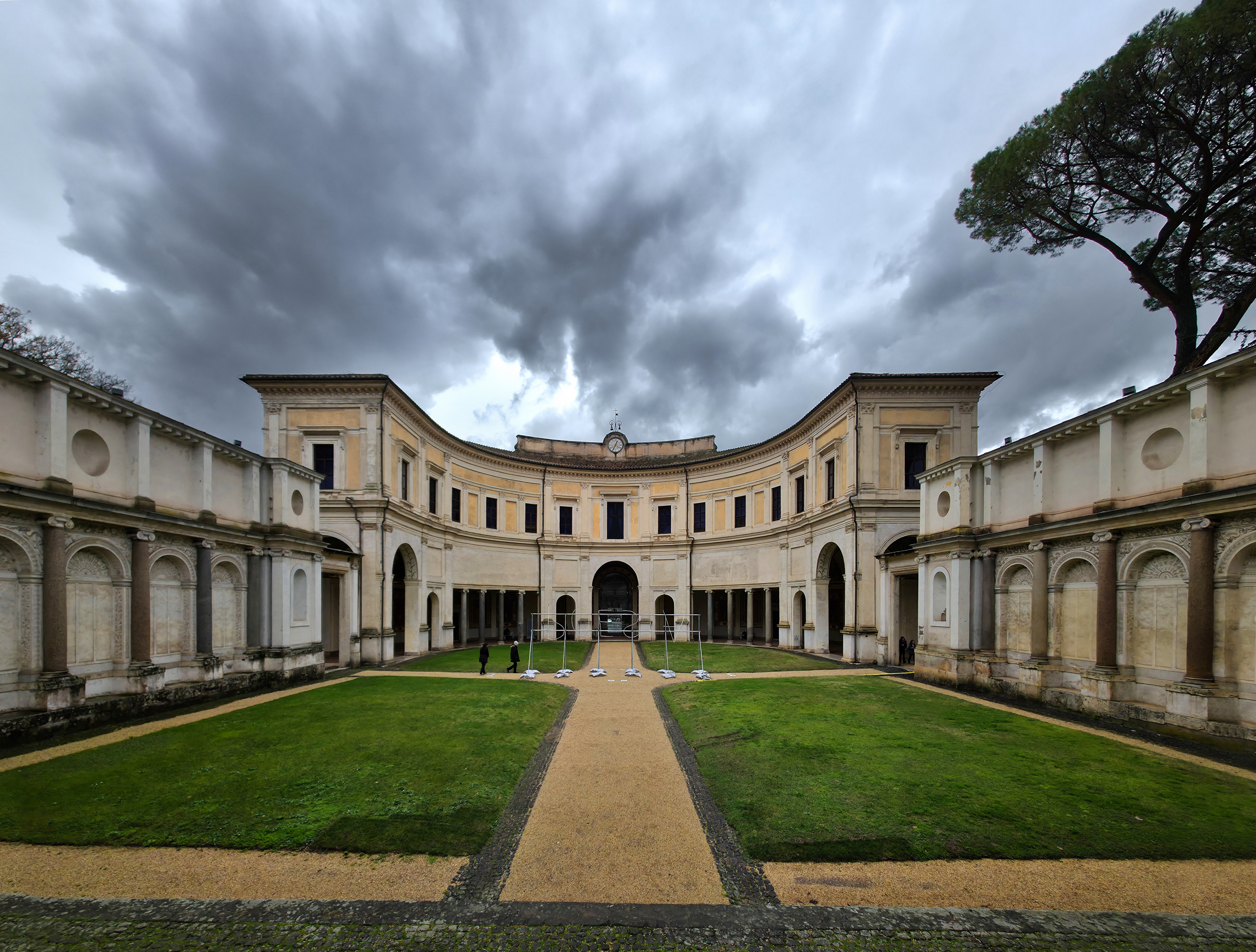
Semicircular portico at the rear of the Casino, Vignola

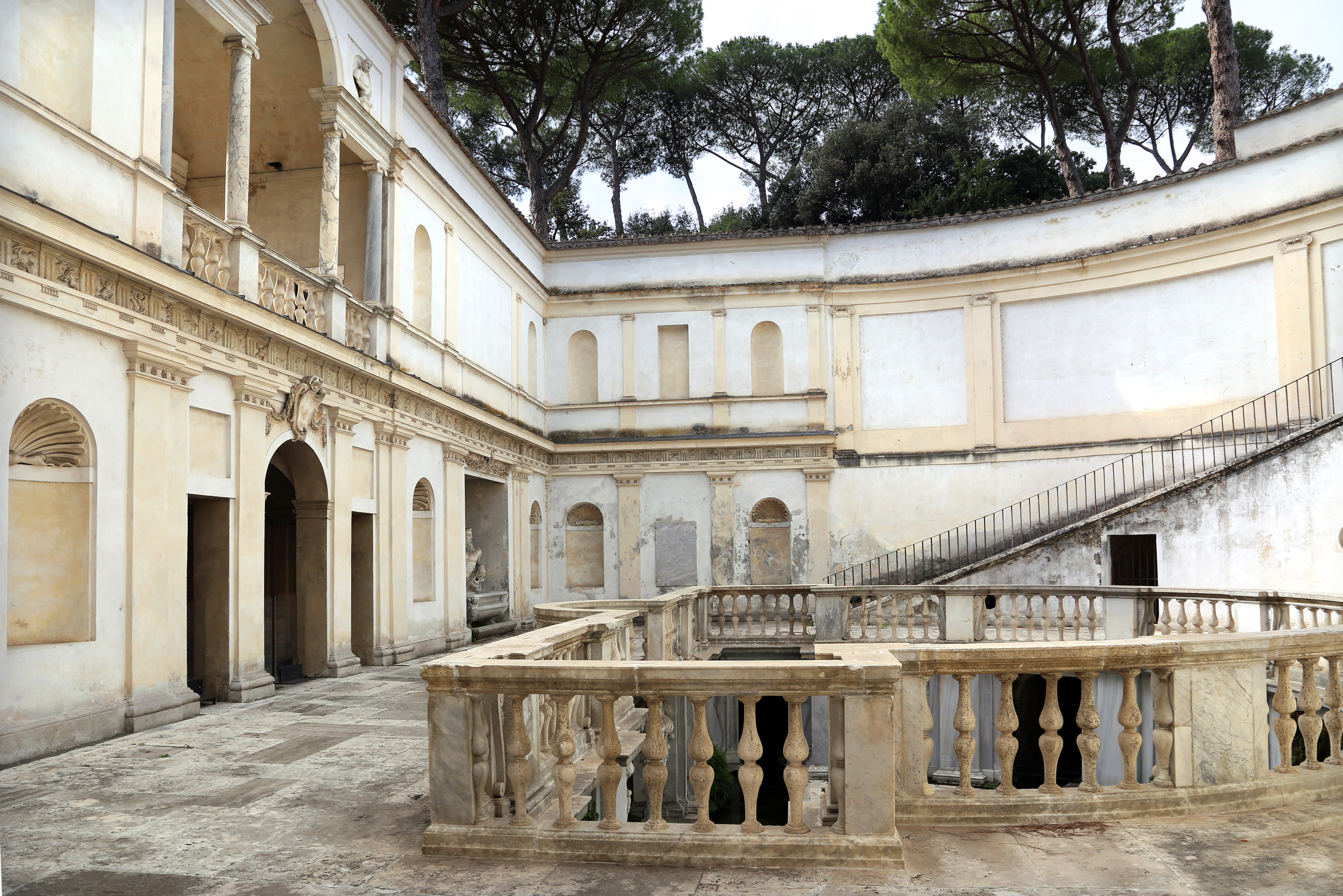
Nymphaeum loggia, detail, Bartolomeo Ammanati

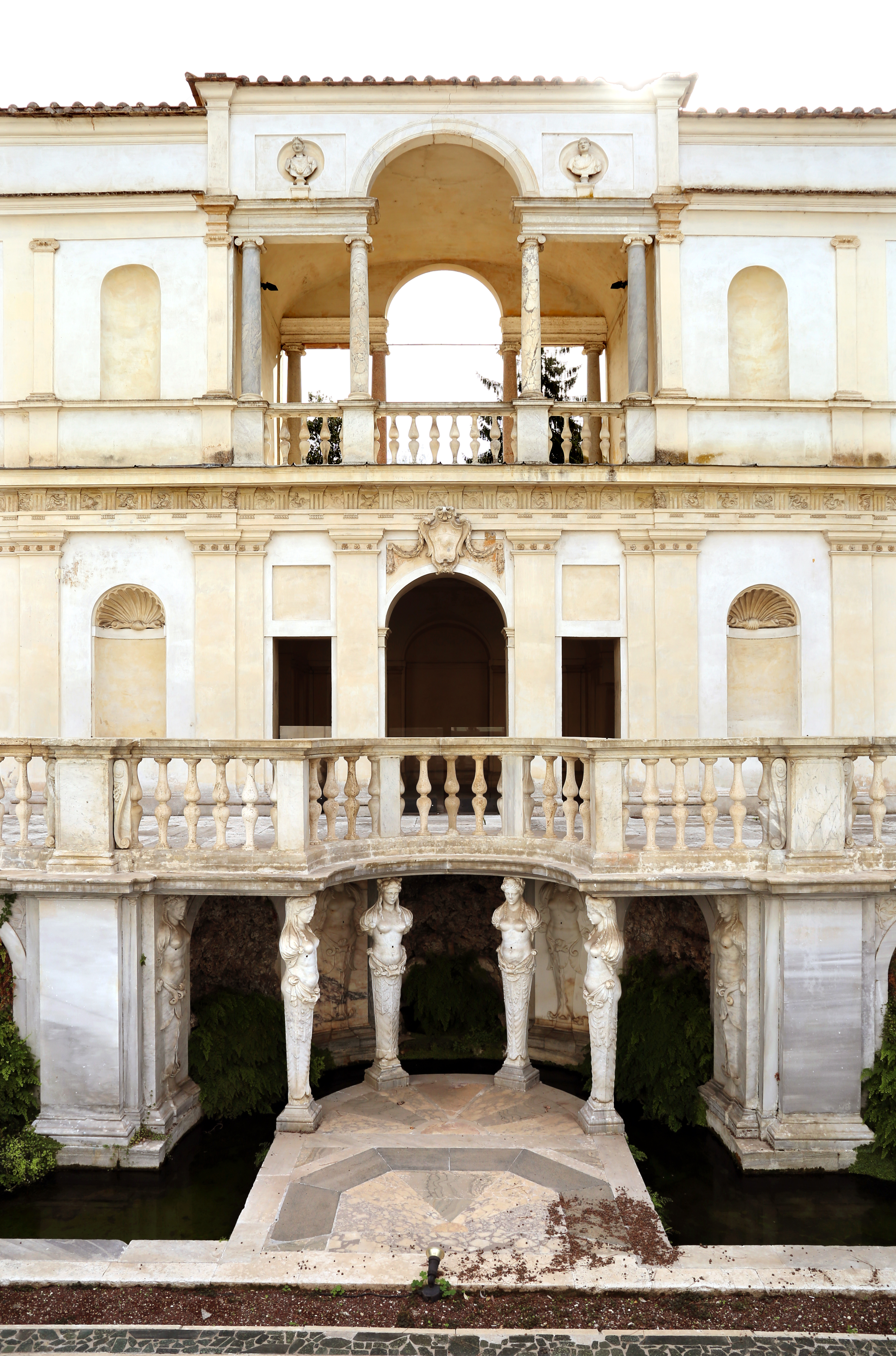
Nymphaeum loggia, Bartolomeo Ammanati

A 1935 medal at the British Museum

== See also ==
- Valle Giulia
- The Sol Wurtzel House in Bel Air, Los Angeles, designed by Wallace Neff and modelled on the Villa Giulia

Preceded by Villa Farnesina	Landmarks of Rome; Villa Giulia	Succeeded by Villa Madama
