= Experimental architecture =

Experimental Architecture is a visionary branch of architecture and research practice that aims to bring about change, and develop forms of architecture never seen before. The common concept behind experimental architecture is the challenging of conventional methods of architecture in order to change the way in which we relate to the natural world, while meeting the needs of all peoples.

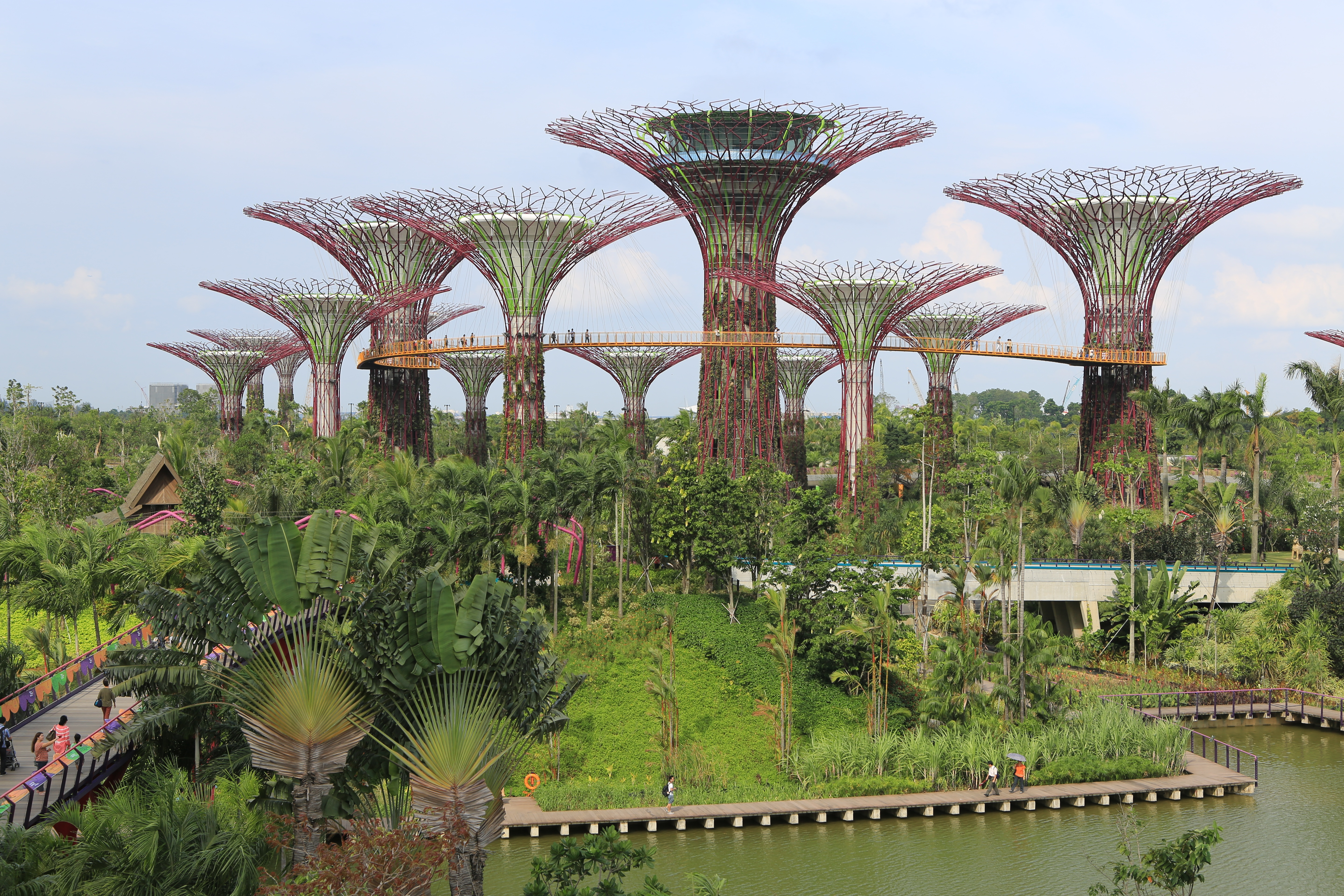
Supertree Grove, Gardens by the Bay, Singapore – 20120712-02

Rather than using architecture to control the environment, experimental architecture seeks to utilize the natural environment in its design, by searching for new ways in which we can inhabit our ecosystem. Experimental architecture considers the contribution of non-humans to our living space. There is also a large emphasis, within experimental architecture, on the inclusivity of all peoples, disadvantaged included, as it addresses the realities of diverse bodies and abilities. Combating climate change, and reducing wastage and pollution is another main focus behind the concept of experimental architecture.

== Methodology ==
Experimental architecture seeks to break out of typical architectural conventions by questioning the limitations of architecture, and experimenting with shapes, materials, technology, construction methods, and social structures. Thus, experimental architecture utilizes a transdisciplinary approach in order to address various issues in its design. A lot of experimental architectural concepts arise from developing efficient structures by examining nature's forms and processes. For example, experimental architecture considers the use of construction materials, such as, super-strong renewable wood, fungus-based self healing concrete, nano cellulose made of waste materials, 3D-printed sandstone and cement that absorbs CO_{2} out of the atmosphere. The use of such materials demonstrates how experimental architecture plans for the entire life cycle of a structure, considering how components of the structure can be reused and/or recycled. The materials considered in experimental architecture are different from the materials typically used in architectural designs, which include steel, concrete, wood, stone and brick. Furthermore, current construction, underpinned by Modern Architecture, is responsible for a large amount of global energy use, greenhouse gas emissions, water use, wood harvests, raw material extraction and waste. Thus, experimental architecture seeks to resist the mainstream practices of modern architecture.

Following Lebbeus Woods’ scholarship, experimental architecture applies a scientific approach to research, requiring that developments of tools and methodologies can be recorded, evaluated and discussed among a community of peers. The contextualization in scientific tradition derives, for example, from Woods’ interest in Isaac Newton's cause-and-effect determinism; his critique of Descartes; and his dedication to deploy design practices for exploring alternatives to Cartesian space.

== History ==
The concept of experimental architecture has been around since the late 20th century. It is seen as having emerged predominantly as a reaction against the functional and standardized architectural design of the post-war years. Architects reacted by taking inspiration from certain art forms, which eventually culminated in the emergence of the concepts of experimental architecture. Experimental architecture also emerged with the increased inventive use of technology and was conceived amid advances of innovative materials, computers, communication, transportation and plastics. Experimental architecture sought to apply these advances to produce more radical and empowering architecture. Experimental architecture was often considered to be a form of paper architecture, referring to architects making utopian, dystopian or fantasy projects that were never meant to be built.

The concept of experimental architecture was first conceived of by the architect Peter Cook in his 1970 book "Experimental Architecture." Peter Cook was also part of the architecture firm Archigram, formed in the 1960s, which embraced the ideology of experimental architecture. However, while the term “experimental architecture” was first coined in Cook's book, the practice of experimental architecture predates 1970, as there are many examples before this time of architecture that could be considered to be experimental architecture.

Lebbeus Woods is another prominent figure in the conceptualization of experimental architecture, he wrote about the topic in a variety of his published Books, in particular his book “Radical Reconstruction” explores the practice and ideas of experimental architecture. Woods played an integral part in researching and conceptualizing experimental architecture. He established the Research Institute for Experimental Architecture in 1988, from which many architectural organizations followed. He also used experimental architectural concepts in multiple of his architectural designs. He was heavily involved in designing experimental, alternative ways of living. An example of Wood's ideas of experimental architecture is in his Underground Berlin design. During the time of the Berlin wall, Woods came up with an experimental design that involved living underground. This design sought to overthrow the current system of values and social control through means of experimental architecture. This design may be considered to be paper architecture as it was merely a concept and was never made into reality.

This topic was further explored by the architect Rachel Armstrong, in her 2019 book "Experimental Architecture: Designing the Unknown." Rachel Armstrong's book is predominantly concerned with theorizing experimental architecture. Rachel Armstrong's’ work investigates a new approach to building materials called ‘living architecture,’ which explores the idea of buildings sharing some of the properties of living systems. Armstrong describes experimental architecture to be about challenging the practice of upholding previous principles of architecture that emerged in the industrial age, to take steps towards more ecologically engaged approaches.

== Organizations ==
There are a multitude of experimental architecture organizations that have emerged since the late 20th century. One example of these organizations is the Research Institute of Experimental Architecture (RIEA), which was founded in 1988 by Lebbeus Woods in Switzerland. Wood describes the institute as having an epistemological approach to architecture. The purpose of RIEA is to advance experimentation and research in the architectural field. RIEA promotes and provides training for experimental design, and implementation of experimental projects.

The Institute for Experimental Architecture at Innsbruck University, founded in 2000 by Volker Giencke, is another organization committed to exploring the concept of experimental architecture.

The Experimental Architecture Group (EAG), founded by Rachel Armstrong, is involved in researching and adopting experimental architecture practices, and adopts an ethical and ecological approach in their exploration of architecture design. They use prototypes to explore new pathways of architecture that acknowledges the diversity of humans and nonhumans. EAG's work has been exhibited and performed at the Venice Art Biennale, Trondheim Biennale, Allenheads Contemporary Arts, Culture Lab and the Tallinn Architecture Biennale. The EAG sets out to enable the transition from an industrial era towards an ecological era, by developing new architectural processes.

The architecture firm, Archigram, which formed in the 1960s, practises experimental architecture by opposing the conventions of modern architecture, in which the architect is the designer of fixed forms, by using adaptive architecture and integrating new technologies in their design.

ARCH5 is an international research consortium that specializes in the design of experimental architecture. This group focuses on developing building techniques that integrate plant technologies and variegated roof systems. An example of their work is their roof landscapes that allow water to percolate through various soil substrates that emulate meadow or fenlike artificial habitats.

== Experimental Architecture in China ==
The practice of experimental architecture has been predominant in China since the end of the 20th century. The concept of experimental architecture began to emerge in China with the appearance of the Art Movement in 1985, experimental novels and avant-garde drama. Experimental architecture was able to emerge in the post-Mao era as authorities gradually permitted private architecture design firms to operate, enabling freedom for the practice of experimental architecture. With fewer of the architectural restraints that were experienced in the Mao era architects were able to explore architecture through innovation and experimentation. Experimental architecture sought to challenge the restrained architecture that resulted from the restrictions of the Mao era.

Experimental architecture emerged in China in two different ways, one being the exploration of ancient Chinese confucian architecture, which was a symbolic expression of the “new great China,” post-Mao. Another way in which experimental architecture manifested was in attempts to follow young international avant-garde, and international modern approaches to architecture, such as de-constructivism. Some Chinese experimental architects have attempted to move away from traditional architectural concepts, theories and forms to create brand new experimental architecture, and some have applied the concepts of experimental architecture to traditional Chinese architecture.

There have been a variety of experimental architecture firms in China that explore the different practices of experimental architecture, some of which explore the deeper layer of Chinese identity and some of which take more of a transnational approach. Some architectural firms in China that practise experimental architecture seek to combine traditional ideas of Chinese architecture with new experimental forms of architecture. For example, Atelier FCJZ, an architecture office located in China, designed an experimental house called Concrete Vessel. The design of this house built upon the concept of a traditional courtyard house in Beijing, while bringing to the design a connectedness with the natural environment, through the use of experimental materials. The material used externally and internally throughout the house was a 3mm thin Glass Fiber reinforced concrete made from recycled construction debris. This thin material was lightweight and its porosity created a living environment that breathes and filters the air while allowing light to come through. This material is an example of how experimental architecture seeks to connect life and nature.

== Examples ==
Architects practicing experimental architecture conceptualize new ideas of architecture. Types of experimental architecture vary, with some types demonstrating the application of ideas and approaches in full scale, and some types using small scale models. Some experimental architecture is considered to be like paper architecture, which illustrates utopian or dystopian visions which may not necessarily be intended for realization. Although, there are a variety of examples of experimental architecture that have been implemented in the real world. Experimental architecture may focus on incorporating the properties of living systems into its design, it may focus on interconnectedness between humans and non-humans, it may focus on the reuse and reusability of designs or it may focus on the ecology of design. Many experimental architecture designs are a combination of these factors.

Singapore's solar-powered Supertrees are considered to be a form of experimental architecture. The Supertrees are a mechanical forest of vertical gardens, rainwater collection systems and conservatories. This architecture is an example of ecologically focused structures that seek to replicate some of the properties of living systems, such as rainforests. It is a form of biomimicry, a practice, common in experimental architecture, that learns from and mimics the strategies found in nature to solve human design challenges.

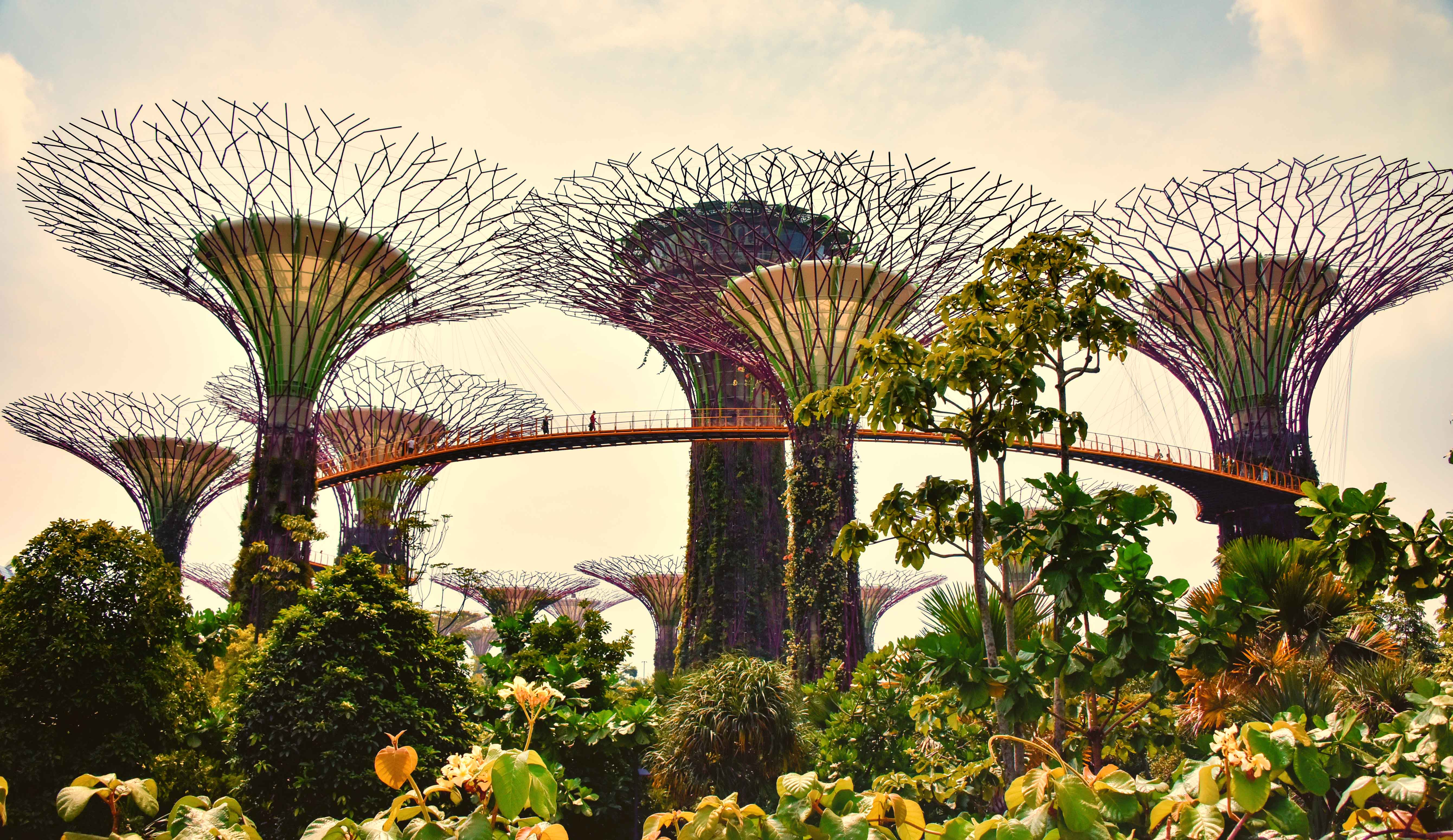
Supertrees, Singapore (27428306290)

Another example of experimental architecture that attempts to encapsulate some of the properties of living systems is the University of Stuttgart's carbon fiber pavilions. This structure is inspired by the lightweight shell that encases the wings and abdomen of a beetle, and thus, this design is another example of biomimicry in experimental architecture. Furthermore, the practise of biomimicry is evident in the development of fiber composites, using 3D printing, based on the behavior of spiders and silkworms. Some Chinese experimental architects have attempted to move away from traditional architectural concepts, theories and forms to create brand new experimental architecture, and some have applied the concepts of experimental architecture to traditional Chinese architecture. 3D printing is a common tool utilized in experimental architecture.

Another experimental architecture concept is the zero-water desert garden design. This design is an ecologically focussed architecture project that explores how the design of urban cities can implement plants that are not dependent on water.

Another example of experimental architecture is the prototype called Co-Occupancy. This design aimed to develop interconnectedness between human and non-human species. The design involved delineating the zones between humans and non-humans, for example designing roofs and foundations so that they could be utilized by animals.

Another example of experimental architecture is the Minnesota's Experimental City, which was a concept design for a self-sustaining city. The design encompassed ideas of recycling, circularity and reversible design.

An example of experimental architecture that considers the entire life cycle of the structure is the Cellophane House. This structure is pre-fabricated and designed for disassembly and reuse of its materials. Lightweight materials were chosen that were reusable within existing recyclable streams. The house was also designed so that it could adapt to different sites and climatic factors, enabling it to be reused in different areas. And it was designed so that there would be no waste from the disassembly process.

An example of experimental architecture that focuses on a user-centre design is the Soar Design Studio's residence, which was converted to a communal space for local students and designed to increase social interaction through connected and open spaces.

== Experimental homes ==
These are smaller scale experimental architecture projects, often small residential homes. Examples include: earth shelters, the Xanadu Houses, and the Prince Edward Island Ark.
