= Haldeman House =

House in Los Angeles

Coordinates: 34°4′48″N 118°25′28″W

The Haldeman House at 10000 Sunset Boulevard is a house designed by Wallace Neff for Henry F. Haldeman and his wife. It is situated on Sunset Boulevard in Holmby Hills, Los Angeles. Hadleman was the owner of a Chrysler car dealership in Los Angeles. He was not related to Harry F. Haldeman who was the father of President Richard Nixon's White House Chief of Staff H. R. Haldeman. The house was completed in 1939 and was sold by the Haldemans to J. M. Friedman in 1947. The businessman Howard Hughes was the first person to rent the house from the Friedmans. Hughes rented the house for his future wife Jean Peters. The actress Terry Moore, who claimed she was married to Hughes, first met him at the house.

The house was featured in the January 1941 issue of Architectural Digest magazine, photographed by Maynard L. Parker, and in California Arts & Architecture in 1940. Elizabeth Jean McMillian wrote in her 2002 book California Colonial: The Spanish and Rancho Revival Styles that the house "emphasiz[es] the horizontality of the structure" being "flush to the ground of a grass forecourt...originally decorated with classical urns".

The house was subsequently occupied by Judy Garland, who rented the house for $1,000 a month in 1949. It was the first home of Garland and her husband Vincent Minnelli's daughter, Liza Minnelli. Garland and Minnelli were estranged; whilst she lived at the Haldeman house, he lived on Evanview Drive. Garland attempted suicide in June 1950 at Minnelli's residence, and was quickly brought to the Haldeman House by her manager, Carleton Alsop. Newspaper reporters had believed that Garland and Minnelli were living together on Evanview Drive, but Alsop's car had been followed, and the Haldeman House was quickly under siege by reporters. A representative from MGM Studios subsequently left the house by the front door after visiting Garland and drew his finger across his throat, thus indirectly telling reporters what had occurred. Sid Luft, Garland's third husband, recalled the house as a "charming house, rather rustic with a large fireplace" and a "cozy, secure retreat with an unhampered view of the hills".

It was subsequently rented by actress Jennifer Jones. The house was featured in the 1950 film Sunset Boulevard; the actor William Holden was chased into the driveway of the house by men seeking to repossess his car. Friedman put the house up for sale in 1954. It was sold in 1955 to Charles Babcock, the heir to the American Tobacco Company.

Statues sculpted by J. Seward Johnson Jr. prominently adorned the property in the 1980s; these would draw tourists and sightseers to the house. Sculptures included two tennis players, children climbing the perimeter wall, and a photographer and architect.

The house was subsequently owned by Los Angeles real estate investor Stanley Black, his wife the late Joyce Black and their children.
