= Roy Mason (architect) =

American architect

- Roy Mason showing a model of the Xanadu House.
- Born: June 29, 1938
- Died: May 19, 1996 (aged 57)
- Education: Yale University School of Architecture
- Occupation: Architect
- Buildings: Foam-built houses Xanadu House

Roy Mason (June 29, 1938 – May 19, 1996) was an American lecturer, writer, and futuristic architect who designed and built a variety of futuristic homes and other buildings in the 1970s and 1980s using low cost materials and alternative energy sources. Mason invented architronics as exemplified in the Xanadu House.

== Biography ==
Before entering his career of architecture and design, Mason received a master's degree from the Yale University School of Architecture.

In 1971, Mason designed a sprayed foam building for an experimental college called College of the Potomac in Paris, Virginia, in 1971. In 1978, Mason created plans for a fifty-home community of solar-powered houses in Columbia, Maryland, that was to be called "Solar Village". In the 1980s, Mason was the architecture editor of the Futurist magazine and the first executive director of the Home Automation Association.

In 1966, Mason was a founding member of the World Future Society and the publisher of Futurist Magazine for which he co-designed their first logo inspired by the Tomoe. During the mid-1980s, Mason Roy was enveloped into the strategic business plan process of Intelligent Building Information Systems (iBis), an Arlington-based subsidiary of Bell System, and became a spokesman for the company.

In 1996, at age 57, Mason was killed by a man named Christopher Robin Hatton at the architect's home in the 4200 block of Military Road NW in Washington, D.C. Hatton was supposedly a close acquaintance of Mason. A month after the slaying, the killer was still on the run and hunted by the police. Hatton, in a drug-induced rage and demanding money from Mason, bludgeoned Mason with a hammer twenty-five times (per the autopsy). Hatton was sentenced to fourteen years for the murder of Roy Mason.

== Works ==
=== Foam houses ===
Mason was interested in futuristic homes that use alternative materials which make it easier to build homes and more affordable. He developed foam-built homes, including the Mushroom House in Bethesda, MD outside Washington, D.C., in 1974. The architect Paul Rudolph would call Roy Mason "the marshmallow architect" because of the fluffy outcome of foam-built houses. The Xanadu House belongs to the Blobitecture style.

=== Smart houses ===
Mason also favored the concept of computer automated homes which he demonstrated in his Xanadu homes with Bob Masters. Mason invented architronics, which was exemplified in his Xanadu House near Disney World. The Xanadu was a prototype of a smart home, with a control center in the family room, lightning control, automatic temperature control, sound-proof and computer-equipped work and study stations, kitchen software for cooking and shopping lists (the 'Robutler'), and a plan to create a fridge/microwave to store and cook food, preprogrammed music playlists selected according to the family mood...

List of projects

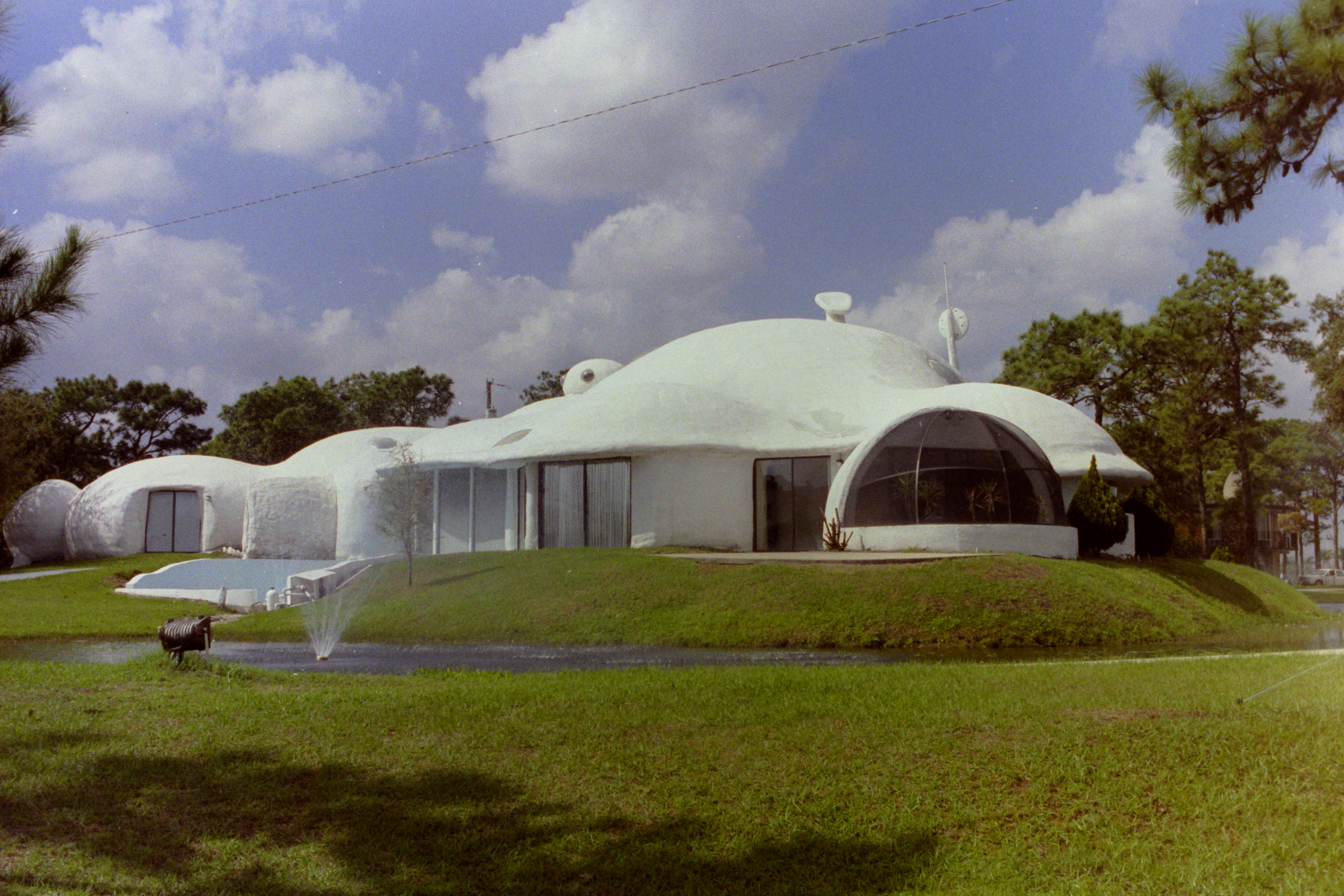
Exterior of Xanadu House in Kissimmee, Florida, 1990.

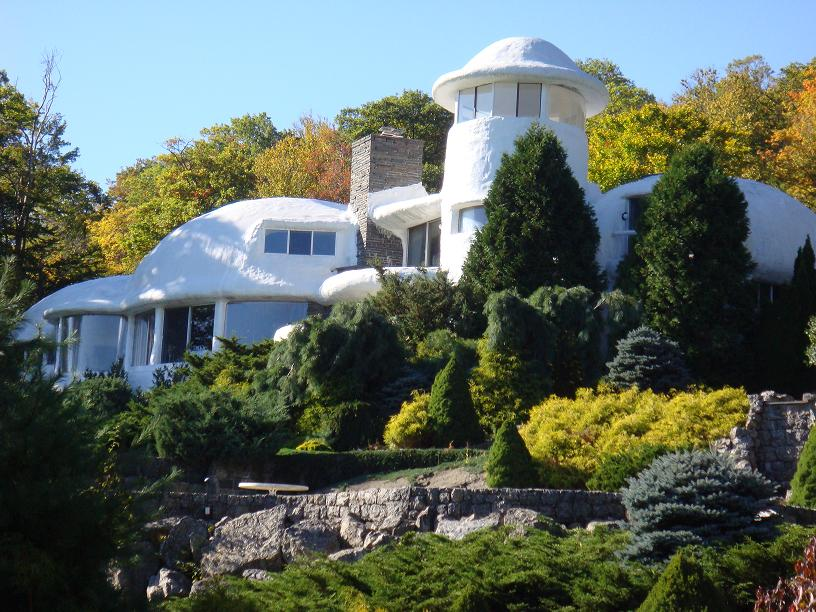
Star Castle in New Fairfield, Connecticut

- Xanadu (1979–1983) visitor attraction franchises built from insulation
- "Star Castle" in New Fairfield, Connecticut
- Experimental school built from insulation in Virginia
- The Mushroom House in Bethesda, MD outside Washington, D.C.
- Exhibits for the Capital Children's Museum
- Capital Children's Museum, India
- 1987: 10130 Darmuid Green Drive, Potomac, Maryland, for Frank and Cecelia Ross.
- Several dome shelter designs for homes
- Solar Village

Roy Mason created several forward-looking exhibits for the Capital Children's Museum in Washington, D.C.

== Awards ==
- 1986: Craftsmanship Award for the Capital Children's Museum in India

== Personal life ==
Mason worked and lived most of his life in and around Washington, D.C. Mason's lover of many years, Brian Carneal, died in 1995 of complications related to HIV. When Mason wasn't in Washington, D.C., he and Carneal resided in Delaware at their Dupont Estate.

== See also ==
- Blobitecture
