= Faith Chapel Christian Center =

- Faith Chapel Christian Center
- 33.51455°N 86.926178°W
- Address: Birmingham, Alabama
- Country: United States
- Denomination: non-denominational
- Website: www.faithchapel.net

History
- Founded: 1981
- Founder: Michael D. Moore

Clergy
- Pastor: Michael K. Moore

Faith Chapel is a non-denominational, Christian, megachurch located in Birmingham, Alabama. The congregation, though largely African American, also consists of a variety of individuals from various ethnic and socio-economic backgrounds. The church has two campuses: their dome campus in which the main services are held, and their older campus in which youth services are held and various administrative offices and resources are located. FCCC is one of the largest churches in Birmingham. Dr. Michael D. Moore was the founding pastor. His son, Michael K. Moore, became the Lead Pastor in 2023.

== History ==
=== Beginnings ===
Faith Chapel started in April, 1981 at Dr. Moore's residence in Wylam, northwest of Fairfield. The church began with four people: Dr. Moore, his wife, his mother, and a friend. The church grew and in six months moved out to Stallworth Funeral home in June 1981. After another year, the church moved to the YWCA in downtown Birmingham.

On February 1, 1982, Faith Chapel sealed the bids for the sale of a 3.4-acre (14,000 m^{2}), 7,645-square-foot (710.2 m^{2}) McDonald Chapel School and were given the right to purchase the property. On July 10, 1983, with less than 30 people, they purchased the land. Between 1990 and 1995, several staff members were hired full-time. The Student Ministry, formerly Lively Stones Teen Church, was also established in 1990. In 1993, the Helps Ministry and the Evangelism Ministry were formed. In the same year, the main sanctuary was renovated, the children’s facility was completed, and the parking lot was paved. The first television broadcast aired in 1994, and in 1996 Faith Chapel paid off $495,000 in about eight months to become debt free.

=== The Word Dome ===
On April 29, 1999, FCCC purchased 37.6 acres (152,000 m^{2}) of land for $237,000. This was the beginning of the multi-million-dollar "Word Dome" building project. On December 19, 1999, Faith Chapel broke ground on the new Dome facility. Construction was completed and use of the facility began on December 15, 2002. Of the $15 million cost, over 98% of the funds came from the within the church via its members. Faith Chapel never had to take out a loan to finance construction of the facility and it was completed entirely debt free, that is, without making use of debt financing.

The building is a concrete, monolithic dome. At 72 feet (22 m) tall, and 280 feet (85 m) in diameter it is the largest diameter monolithic dome designed by the Monolithic Dome Institute. Its large size makes possible a floor area of 74,500 square feet (6,920 m^{2}) in two levels. Designed by Lathan Associates Architects, P.C., it was constructed by Gary C. Wyatt General Contractor, LLC., out of Birmingham.

=== Present day ===
Today, Faith Chapel has a membership of over 6400 members and is embarking on another multi-million-dollar project, their Family Activity Center.

The mission of this center is to provide a safe place for youth and adults to socialize. This $16.5 million project is a six dome addition to FCCC's already vast property. The Groundbreaking ceremony was held on June 12, 2005. Of the six interconnected domes, two will measure 160 feet (49 m) in diameter and four will measure 140 feet (43 m) in diameter. The domes will house many amenities, including a 12-lane bowling alley, a teen dance club, a Christian adult smoke-free and alcohol-free nightclub with Christian entertainers, an indoor playground for children, a fitness center complete with strength training equipment, indoor track, and basketball courts, a banquet facility, and a lobby area with a centrally located climbing wall.
