= Sol Wurtzel House =

House designed by Wallace Neff

Coordinates: 34°5′0″N 118°26′32″W

The Sol Wurtzel House at 10539 Bellagio Road is a house designed by Wallace Neff for the film producer Sol M. Wurtzel and his wife, Marian. It is situated on Bellagio Road, in Bel Air, Los Angeles.

Neff received the commission in 1930 and the house was completed in 1932. It was set over a 1.5-acre site, and was 9,000 sq ft in size in 1991. The house is designed in a semicircle which fits the natural contour of the terrain. The house has two distinctive staircases which lead from the principal rooms of the house to a large terrace and tennis court. The main entrance to the house is framed by an elaborate pair of Corinthian columns two stories in height topped with a broken pediment and urn.

Neff designed all rooms to "have at least two exposures opening onto wide loggias and terraces which overlook the gardens and on beyond to the sea" to enhance the views from the property. The house is 180 ft in length and situated on a 1.5-acre site that overlooks the Bel-Air Country Club. A large terrace and loggia with swimming pool was added by Neff to the west side of the house in 1939. A library and four bedrooms were situated on the second floor at the time of its construction, it had five bedrooms and seven bathrooms at the time of its 2019 sale with separate staff and guest rooms. The house was modelled by Neff on the Villa Giulia designed by Giacomo Barozzi da Vignola for Pope Julius III. Kevin Starr praises the "splendiferous theatricality" of the house in his 1991 book Material Dreams: Southern California Through the 1920s.

Wurtzel's wife, Marian, decorated the house with reproduction antique furniture and English silver and crystal chandeliers sourced from Italy.

The psychic and astrologer Anthony Norvell acquired the house for $125,000 in 1953 (equivalent to $1,469,061 in 2024). It was the home of the British actor Reginald Owen in the 1950s; Owen sold it to Dolly Green in 1962. Green was the last surviving child of Burton Green, the co-founder of Beverly Hills. Green lived in the house from the early 1970s until her death in 1991. It was sold for $4.78 million in 1991 (equivalent to $11,034,991 in 2024) to the television producer William J. Bell, having previously been offered at $6.9 million. It was bought by businessman Jay Stein in 2019 for $31 million having been on the market since 2018 with an asking price of $37.5 million.

It remains privately owned.
