= Fredric March House =

House in Bel Air, Los Angeles

The Fredric March House is a house designed by Wallace Neff for the actors Fredric March and Florence Eldridge. It is situated at 1026 Ridgedale Road, in Bel Air, Los Angeles.

It was built by Neff for the actors Fredric March and Florence Eldridge. It is set in 1.2 acres of grounds. The house had five bedrooms and 13 bathrooms at the time of its 2020 sale. Amenities included a swimming pool and tennis court with pavilion. The style of the house has been described as both Tudor Revival and French Norman. It has a distinctive octagonal 'dovecote' tower.

Subsequent owners included the photographer Shirley Burden, the lawyer Ken Ziffren and the philanthropist Wallis Annenberg. The house was bought in 2001 for $13.5 million by the actors Brad Pitt and Jennifer Aniston who spent two years refurbishing and expanding it. The couple added a screening room. It was listed for sale for $28 million in 2009 following their divorce. It was 10,000-plus-square-foot in size at the time of its 2009 sale, and had expanded to 12,000 sq ft by 2020. It was listed for sale in 2019 for $56 million and subsequently reduced to $44.5 million. It was sold in 2020 for $32.5 million.

It was featured in the January 1934 issue of Architectural Digest, with photography by Padilla.

It remains privately owned as of 2025.
