= Xanadu Houses =

Series of experimental homes in the US

Xanadu: Home of the Future
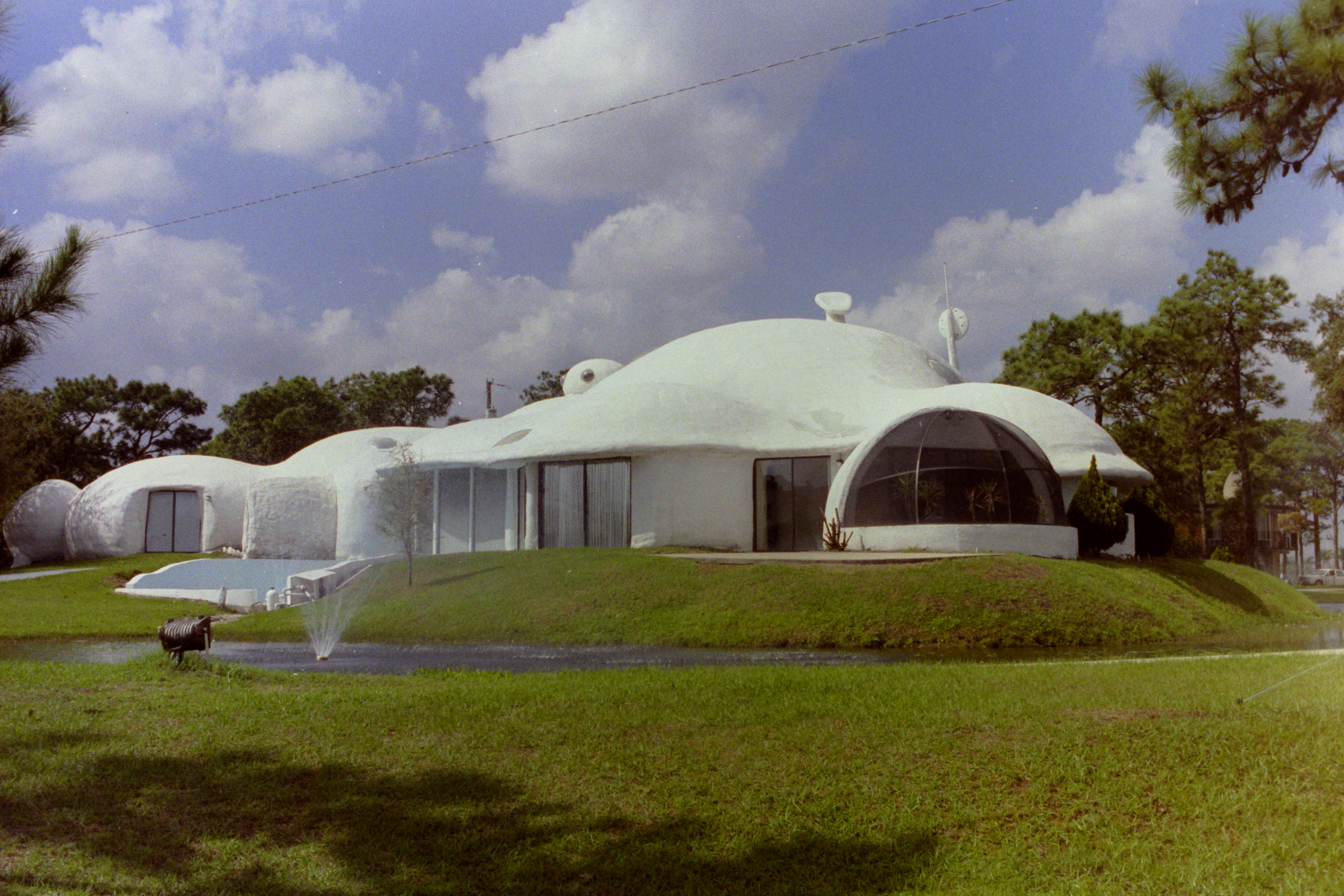
- The Exterior of Xanadu House in Kissimmee, Florida, 1990
- Location: Wisconsin Dells, Wisconsin, Gatlinburg, Tennessee, Kissimmee, Florida
- Status: Defunct
- Opened: 1979
- Closed: 1996
- Owner: Roy Mason

Wisconsin Dells, Wisconsin
- Status: Closed & Demolished In The Early 1990’s
- Opened: 1979
- Closed: Early 1990’s

Gatlinburg, Tennessee
- Status: Closed & Demolished In The Early 1990’s
- Opened: June 1982
- Closed: Early 1990’s

Kissimmee, Florida
- Status: Closed In 1996 & Demolished Around October, 2005
- Opened: 1983
- Closed: 1996

The Xanadu Houses were a series of experimental homes built to showcase examples of computers and automation in the home in the United States. The architectural project began in 1979, and during the early 1980s three houses were built in different parts of the United States: one each in Kissimmee, Florida; Wisconsin Dells, Wisconsin; and Gatlinburg, Tennessee. The houses included novel construction and design techniques, and became popular tourist attractions during the 1980s.

The Xanadu Houses were notable for their easy, fast, and cost-effective construction as self-supporting monolithic domes of polyurethane foam without using concrete. They were ergonomically designed, and contained some of the earliest home automation systems. The Kissimmee Xanadu, designed by Roy Mason, was the most popular, and at its peak was attracting 1000 visitors every day. The Wisconsin Dells and Gatlinburg houses were closed and demolished in the early 1990s; the Kissimmee Xanadu House was closed in 1996 and demolished in October 2005.

== History ==
=== Early development ===
Bob Masters was an early pioneer of houses built of rigid insulation. Before conceiving the Xanadu House concept, Masters designed and created inflatable balloons to be used in the construction of houses. He was inspired by architect Stan Nord Connolly's Kesinger House in Denver, Colorado, one of the earliest homes built from insulation. Masters built his first balloon-constructed house exterior in 1969 in less than three days during a turbulent snowstorm, using the same methods later used to build the Xanadu houses.

Masters was convinced that these dome-shaped homes built of foam could work for others, so he decided to create a series of show homes in the United States. Masters's business partner Tom Gussel chose the name "Xanadu" for the homes, a reference to Xanadu, the summer capital of Yuan, which is prominently featured in Samuel Taylor Coleridge's famous poem Kubla Khan. The first Xanadu House opened in Wisconsin Dells, Wisconsin. It was designed by architect Stewart Gordon and constructed by Masters in 1979. It was 4,000 square feet (370 m^{2}) in area, and featured a geodesic greenhouse. 100,000 people visited the new attraction in its first summer.

=== Popularity ===
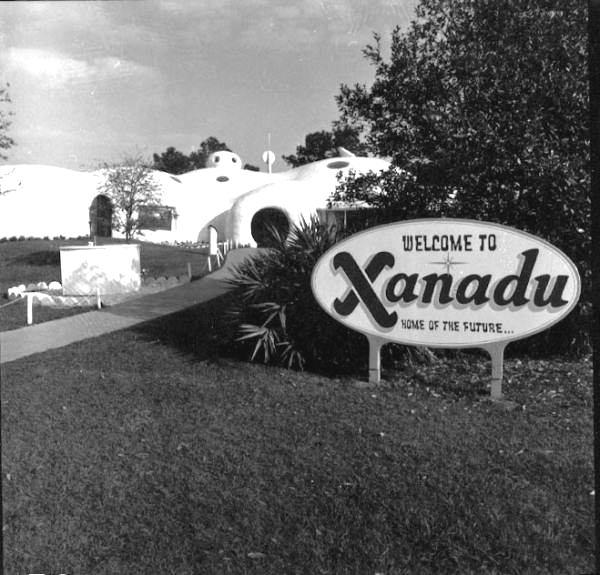
Welcome sign at Kissimmee Xanadu house, 1985

The most popular Xanadu house was the second house, designed by architect Roy Mason. Masters met Mason in 1980 at a futures conference in Toronto. Mason had worked on a similar project prior to his involvement in the creation of the Kissimmee Xanadu House — an "experimental school" on a hill in Virginia which was also a foam structure. Both Mason and Masters were influenced by other experimental houses and building concepts which emphasized ergonomics, usability, and energy efficiency. These included apartments designed by architect Kisho Kurokawa featuring detachable building modules and more significant designs including a floating habitat made of fiberglass designed by Jacques Beufs for living on water surfaces, concepts for living underwater by architect Jacques Rougerie and the Don Metz house built in the 1970s which took advantage of the earth as insulation. Fifty years before Xanadu House, another house from the 1933 Homes of Tomorrow Exhibition at the Century of Progress Exposition in Chicago introduced air conditioning, forced air heating, circuit breakers and electric eye doors.

Mason believed Xanadu House would alter people's views of houses as little more than inanimate, passive shelters against the elements. "No one's really looked at the house as a total organic system", said Mason, who was also the architecture editor of The Futurist magazine. "The house can have intelligence and each room can have intelligence." The estimated cost of construction for one home was $300,000. Roy Mason also planned a low cost version which would cost $80,000, to show that homes using computers do not have to be expensive. The low cost Xanadu was never built. Approximately 1,000 homes were built using this type of construction.

The Walt Disney Company opened Epcot Center in Florida on October 1, 1982 (originally envisioned as the Experimental Prototype Community of Tomorrow). Masters, fellow Aspen High School teacher, Erik V Wolter, and Mason decided to open a Xanadu House several miles away in Kissimmee. It eventually opened in 1983, after several years of research into the concepts Xanadu would use. It was over 6,000 square feet (560 m^{2}) in size, considerably larger than the average house because it was built as a showcase. At its peak in the 1980s, under the management of Wolter, more than 1,000 people visited the new Kissimmee attraction every day. A third Xanadu House was built in Gatlinburg, Tennessee. Shortly after the Xanadu Houses were built and opened as visitor attractions, tourism companies began to advertise them as the "home of the future" in brochures encouraging people to visit.

=== Demise ===
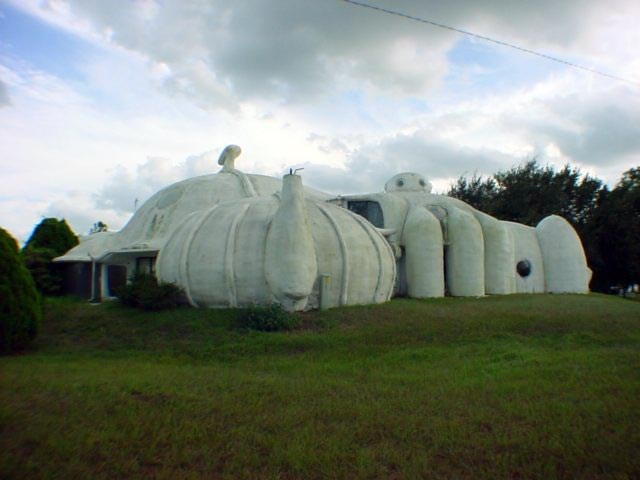
Exterior of Xanadu House in Kissimmee, Florida, 2004

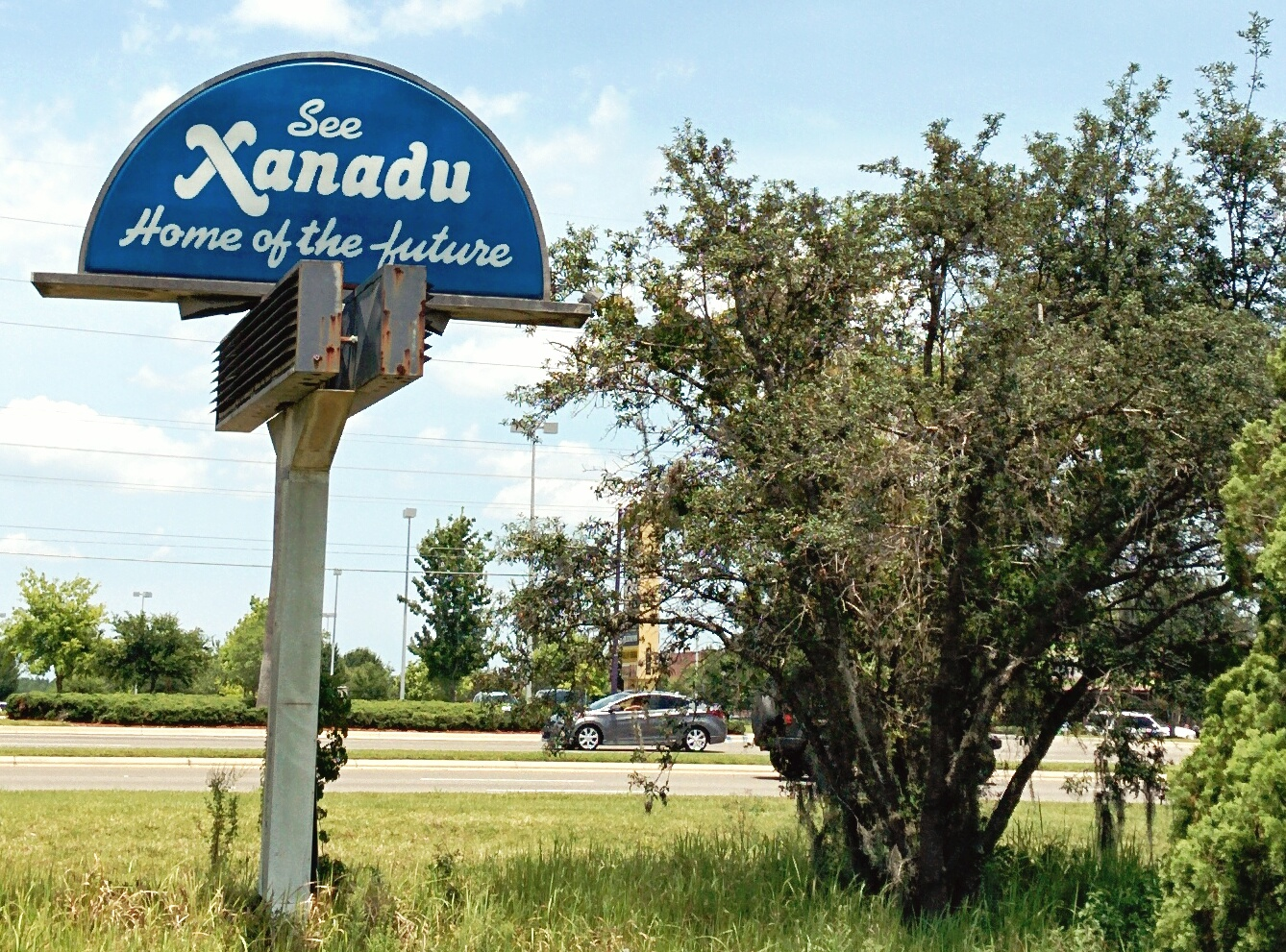
Abandoned sign in Hunter's Creek, Florida, 2014

By the early 1990s, the Xanadu houses began to lose popularity because the technology they used was quickly becoming obsolete, and as a result the houses in Wisconsin and Tennessee were demolished, while the Xanadu House in Kissimmee continued to operate as a public visitor attraction until it was closed in 1996. It was consequently put up for sale in 1997 and was sold for office and storage use. By 2001, the Kissimmee house had suffered greatly from mold and mildew throughout the interior due to a lack of maintenance since being used as a visitor attraction, it was put up for sale again for an asking price of US$2 million. By October 2005, the last of the Xanadu houses had been demolished, following years of abandonment and use by the homeless.

The Kissimmee house was featured in the 2007 movie Urban Explorers: Into the Darkness. It showed the house in disrepair with doors wide open, mold growing everywhere and a homeless man living inside. The "explorers" walked through the house filming the decay firsthand as the homeless man slept in a chair on the main floor. At the end of the segment, the man wakes up and threatens the "explorers" telling them to leave his home.

== Design ==
=== Construction ===
Construction of the Xanadu house in Kissimmee, Florida, began with the pouring of a concrete slab base and the erection of a tension ring 40 feet (12 m) in diameter to anchor the domed roof of what would become the "Great Room" of the house. A pre-shaped vinyl balloon was formed and attached to the ring, and then inflated by air pressure from large fans. Once the form was fully inflated, its surface was sprayed with quick-hardening polyurethane plastic foam. The foam, produced by the sudden mixture of two chemicals that expand on contact to 30 times their original volume, hardened almost instantly. Repeated spraying produced a five-to-six-inch-thick structurally sound shell within a few hours. Once the foam cured, the plastic balloon form was removed to be used again. Once the second dome was completed and the balloon form removed, the two rooms were joined by wire mesh which was also sprayed with foam to form a connecting gallery or hall. This process was repeated until the house was complete. Window, skylight, and door openings were cut and the frames foamed into place. Finally, the interior of the entire structure was sprayed with a 3/4 inch (1.9 cm) coating of fireproof material that also provided a smooth, easy-to-clean finish for walls and ceilings. The exterior was given a coat of white elastomeric paint as the final touch.

=== Interior ===
A Xanadu House was ergonomically designed, with future occupants in mind. It used curved walls, painted concrete floors rather than carpets, a light color scheme featuring cool colors throughout, and an open-floor plan linking rooms together without the use of doors. It had at least two entrances, and large porthole-type windows. The interior of the house was cave-like, featuring cramped rooms and low ceilings, although it is not clear whether these accounts describe the same Xanadu House with a thirty-foot dome. The interiors used a cream color for the walls, and a pale green for the floor.

The Xanadu house in Kissimmee, Florida used an automated system controlled by Commodore microcomputers. The house had fifteen rooms; of these the kitchen, party room, health spa, and bedrooms all used computers and other electronic equipment heavily in their design. The automation concepts which Xanadu House used are based on original ideas conceived in the 1950s and earlier. The Xanadu Houses aimed to bring the original concepts into a finished and working implementation. Inside the house, there was an electronic tour guide for the benefit of visitors, and the family room featured video screens that displayed computer-graphics art. These art displays were constantly changing, being displayed on video screens as opposed to static mediums. The home also featured fire and security systems, along with a master bath that included adjustable weather conditions and a solar-heated steam bath.

At the center of the house was the "great room", the largest in the house. It featured a large false tree supporting the roof, and also acted as part of the built-in heating system. The great room also included a fountain, small television set, and a video projector. Nearby was the dining room, featuring a glass table with a curved seat surrounding it; behind the seats was a large window covering the entire wall. The family room featured walls covered with television monitors and other electronic equipment. The entertainment center in the family room was described as an "electronic hearth" by the home's builders. It was planned as a gathering place for family members and relatives along the same lines as a traditional hearth with a fireplace.

The kitchen was automated by "autochef", an electronic dietitian which planned well-balanced meals. Meals could be cooked automatically at a set date and time. If new food was required, it could either be obtained via tele-shopping through the computer system or from Xanadu's own greenhouse. The kitchen's computer terminal could also be used for the household calendar, records, and home bookkeeping.

The Xanadu homes also suggested a way to do business at home with the office room and the use of computers for electronic mail, access to stock and commodities trading, and news services.

Computers in the master bedroom allowed for other parts of the house to be controlled. This eliminated chores such as having to go downstairs to turn off the coffee pot after one had gone to bed. The children's bedroom featured the latest in teaching microcomputers and "videotexture" windows, whose realistic computer-generated landscapes could shift in a flash from scenes of real places anywhere in the world to imaginary scenes. The beds at the right of the room retreated into the wall to save space and cut down on clutter; the study niches were just the right size for curling up all alone with a pocket computer game or a book.

In the spa, people could relax in a whirlpool, sun sauna, and environmentally-controlled habitat, and exercise with the assistance of spa monitors. One of the advantages of using computers in the home includes security. In Xanadu House, a HAL-type voice spoke when someone entered to make the intruder think someone was home.

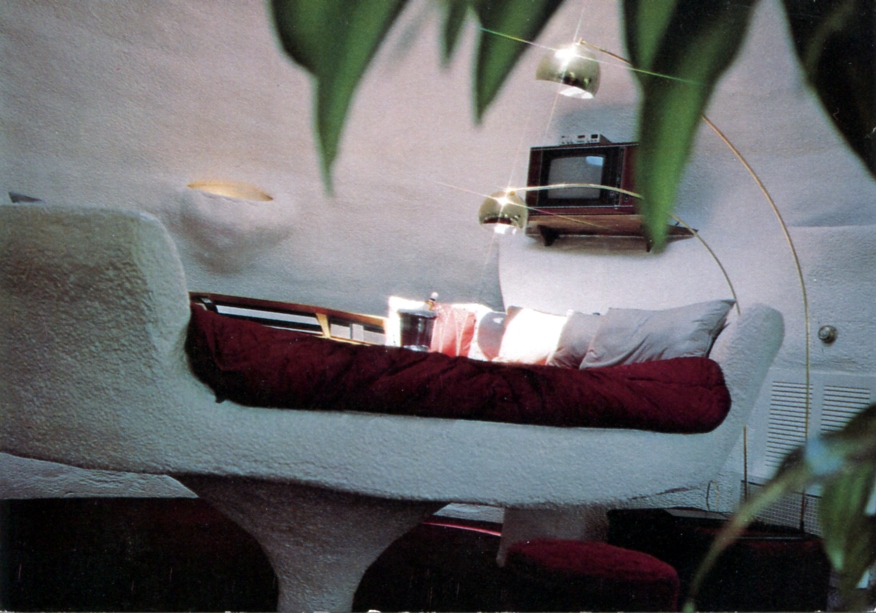
Master Bedroom

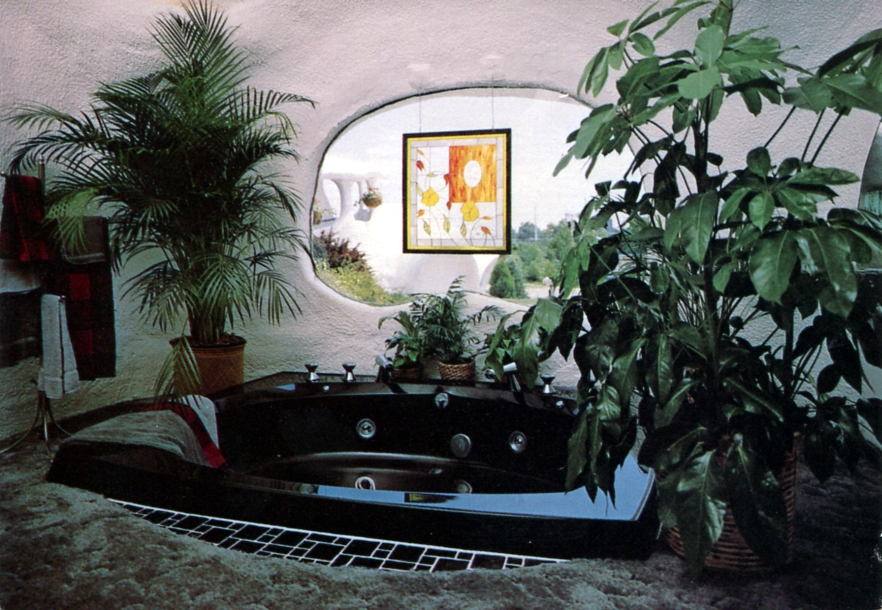
Whirlpool Tub

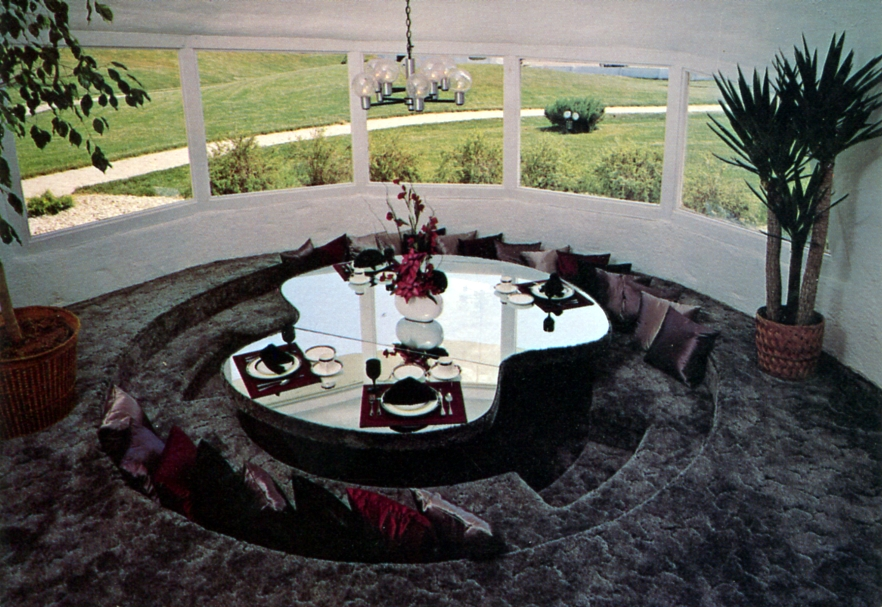
Dining Room

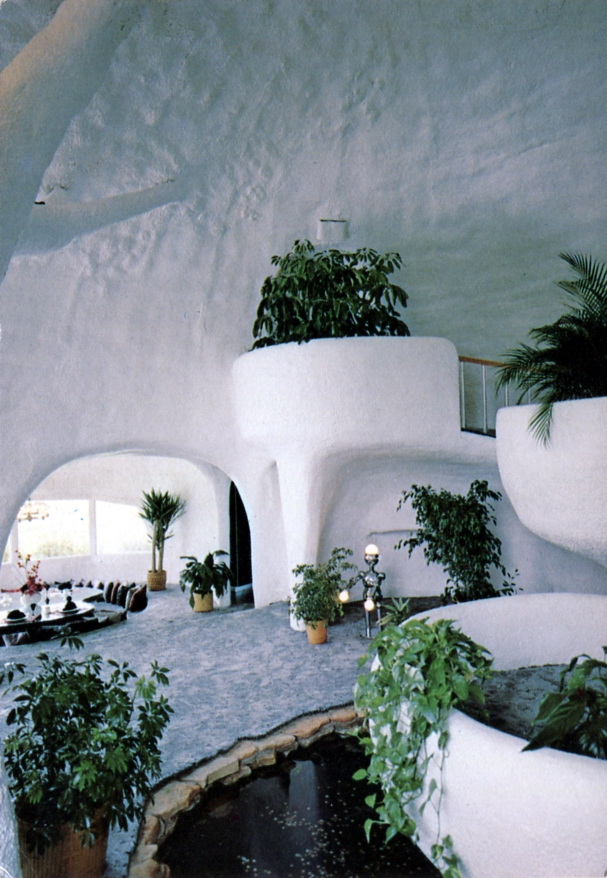
Indoor Ponds

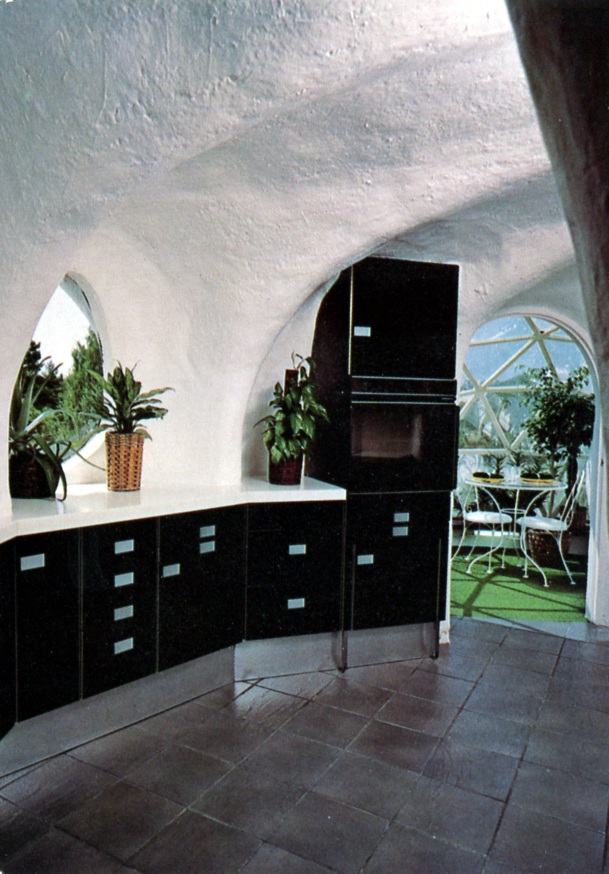
Kitchen

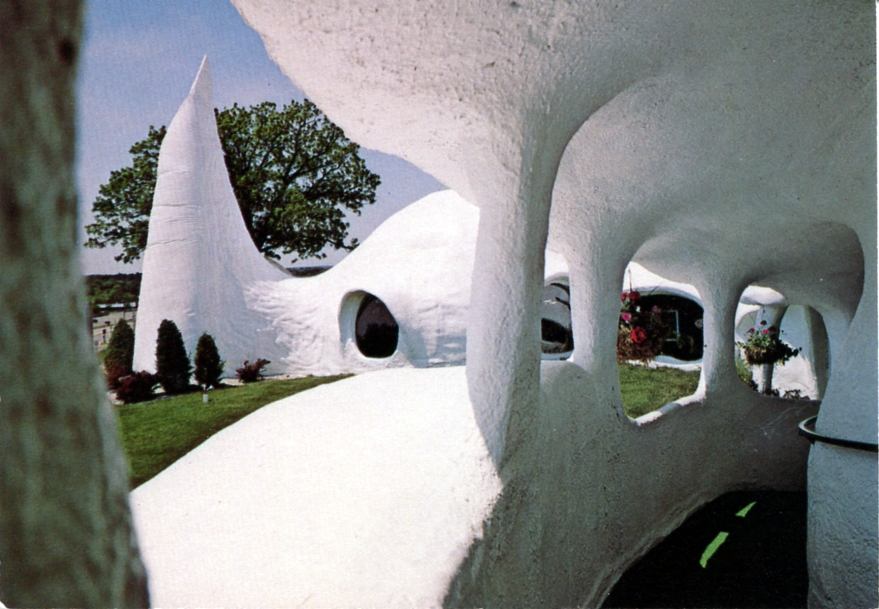
Outdoors View

=== Concerns over energy consumption ===
An initial concern was that electricity costs would be excessive, since several computers would be operating continuously. Mason figured that a central computer could control the energy consumption of all the other computers in the house.

== See also ==
- Buckminster Fuller's Dymaxion house
- House of Innovation
- Sanzhi UFO houses
