= Monolithic dome =

Thin-shell structure cast in a one-piece form

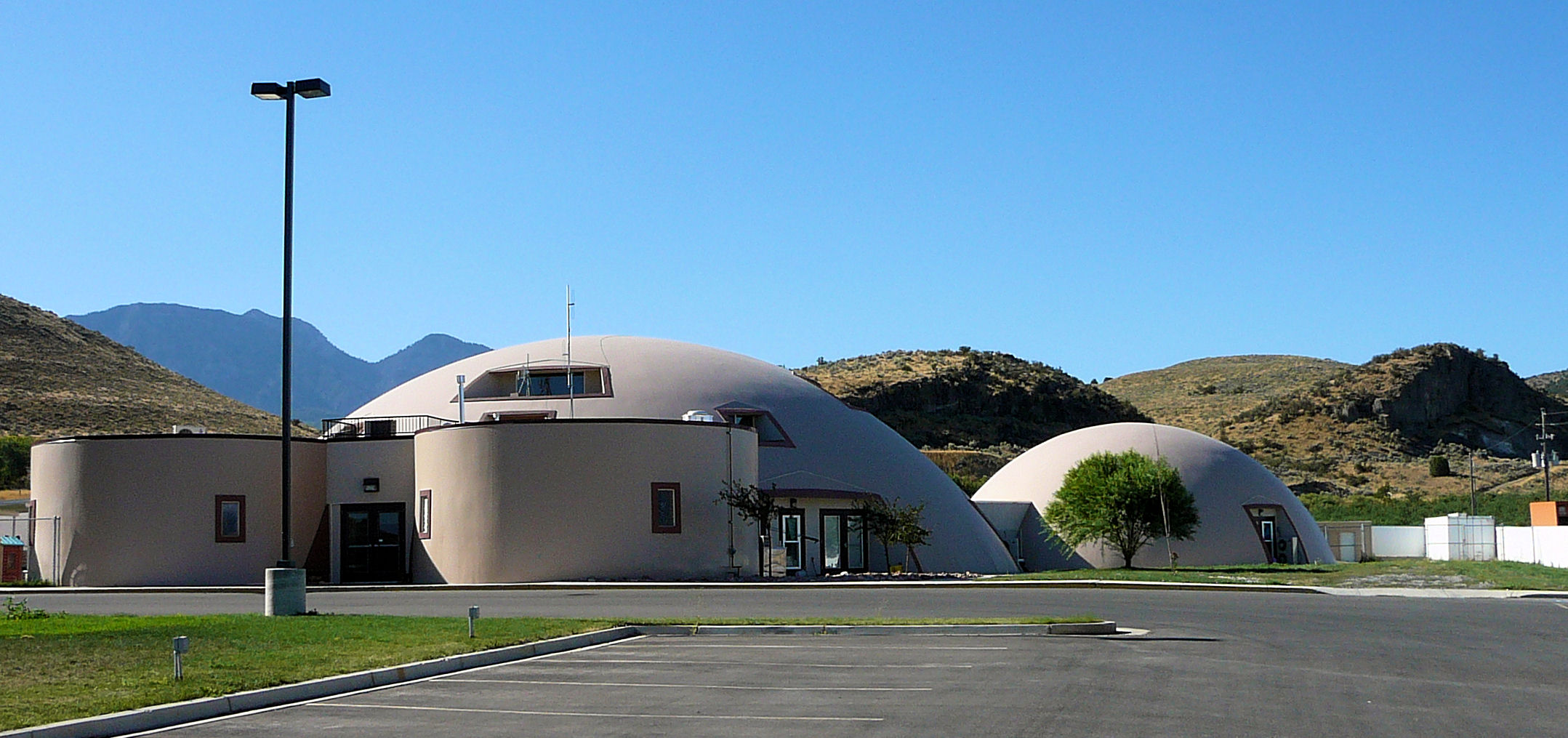
Example of a monolithic dome at the Centro de la Familia de Utah Migrant Head Start Center, Genola, Utah.

A monolithic dome (from Greek mono- and -lithic, meaning "one stone") is a thin-shell structure cast in a one-piece form. The form may be permanent or temporary and may or may not remain part of the finished structure. Monolithic domes are a form of monolithic architecture.

== History ==
The igloo may be the earliest form of monolithic dome. While it is constructed of blocks of compressed snow, these blocks melt and re-freeze to form a strong, homogeneous structure. The dome-like shape of the igloo exhibits the two major advantages of a dome-shaped structure: great strength, and good insulation. The strength is due to the natural strength of the arch, and the insulation is due to the minimal surface area of a spherical section.

The first modern concrete monolithic dome structure were built with US federal government funding in Falls Church, Virginia by architect Wallace Neff. The community of 12 concrete "bubble houses" were used to provide housing for defense workers during World War II. The structures were nicknamed the "Igloo Village" by local residents.

In 1963 architect Lee C. Knell, built a larger dome in Provo, Utah as an ice skating rink. Called Ream's Turtle after its 1967 conversion into a general store by new owner Paul Ream, the building stood until it was demolished in 2006 for new construction.

Turtle Reams was built by first creating a mound of dirt in the desired shape of the shell, an ellipsoidal section 240 feet (73 m) long, 160 feet (49 m) wide and 40 feet (12 m) high. The mound was then covered in a grid of rebar, to provide strength, and a layer of concrete approximately 4 inches (100 mm) thick. After the concrete was cured, the dirt was excavated through the doorways, leaving the roof standing in its place. A floor was then poured to finish the structure.

Today, monolithic domes are used in a variety of residential, commercial and industrial projects. Because of the strength, durability and economics, they are used to store large amounts of various commodities in the cement, fertilizer, agricultural, power and mining industries. Due to their structural integrity, they are used as the containment buildings at some nuclear power plants. Forms have been made using nearly every common structural material, including air-pressure-supported fabric.

== Current construction methods ==
Modern construction differs significantly from the original concrete-over-dirt method. The current methods were developed by three brothers from Idaho: David, Barry, and Randy South. The first dome built using these method was constructed in April 1976 in Shelley, Idaho:

- A reinforced concrete foundation, or "ring beam", is constructed, defining the shape of the base of the structure.
- The fabric form, or air form, is attached to the foundation and inflated with an air blower. The air form contains an airlock to allow workers to enter the form while it is inflated.
- A layer of polyurethane foam is sprayed on the interior of the form. (Its purposes are to give rigidity to the air form, secure the re-bar in place, provide support for spraying in the concrete mixture, and insulate the final structure.)
- Rebar is attached to the outside layer of foam, using clips that are attached to the foam.
- Several inches of concrete are sprayed over the re-bar frame.
- After the concrete has set, the blower is turned off.
- The exposed surface of the air form may be left as is, or a surface treatment such as paint, tile, etc., may be applied. (Proper selection of air form material will ensure prevention from long-term degradation due to ultraviolet radiation.)

In instances where necessity requires economical construction for multiple small and basic dwellings, the dome can be built without insulation and the air form can be removed after completion and re-used to build additional domes.

== Durability ==
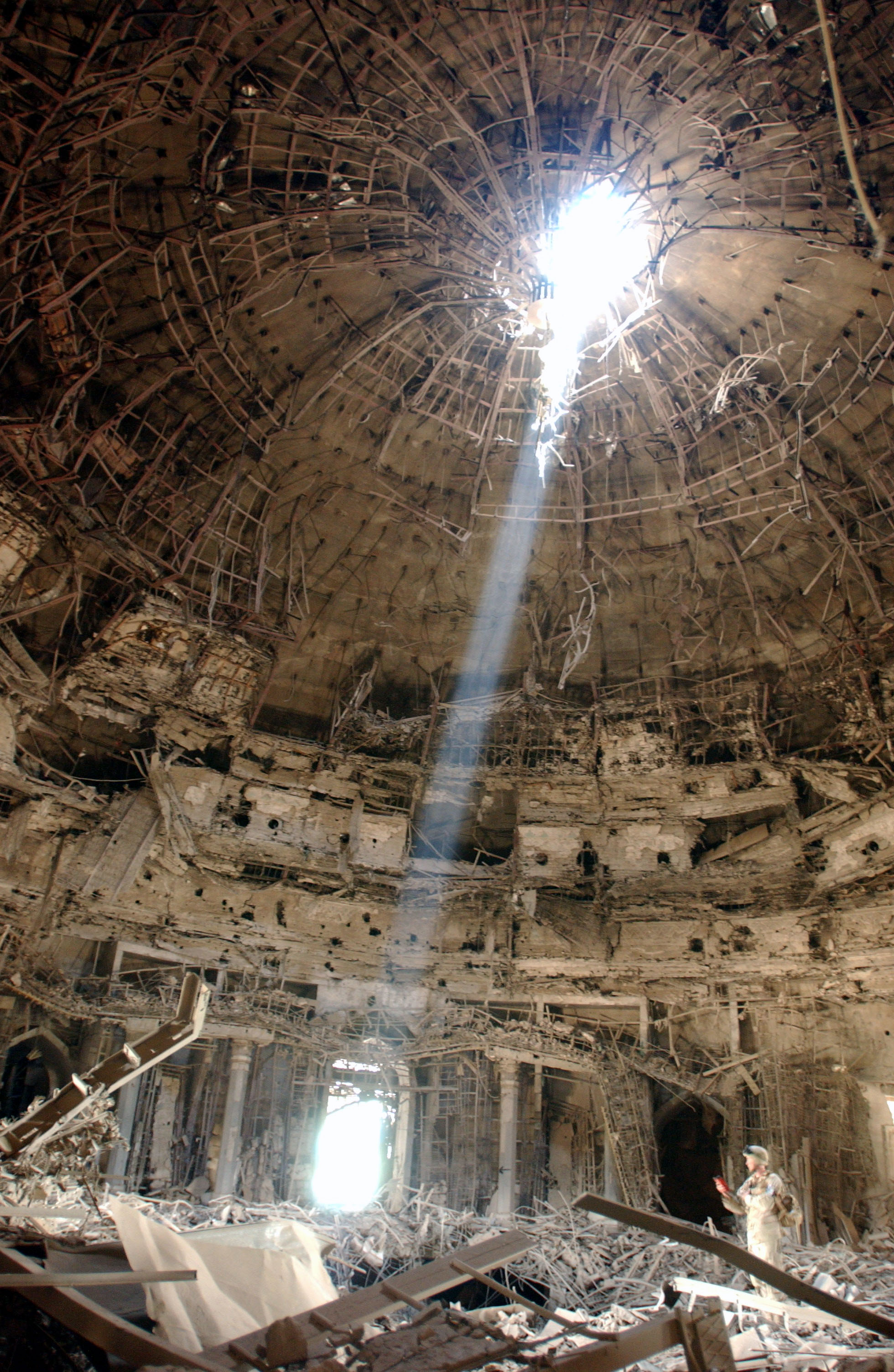
This domed government building in Baghdad, formerly a part of Saddam Hussein's regime, was hit by a 5,000 lb (2,300 kg). bomb. Apart from the hole made by the entry of the bomb, it remained structurally sound.

The dome, when finished, is earthquake, tornado and hurricane resistant (the US Federal Emergency Management Agency rates them as "near-absolute protection" from F5 tornadoes and Category 5 Hurricanes). Recently, a number of monolithic domes constructed using MDI techniques have survived major disasters:

- Several monolithic domes in Florida survived direct hits by Hurricane Katrina in 2005.
- Many monolithic domes were in the path of the 2005 and 2006 wildfires in Oklahoma and Texas, and survived with only slight charring of the exterior foam insulation.
- In 2003, a monolithic dome government building in Iraq survived a direct hit by a 5,000 lb (2,300 kg). bomb. The interior of the structure was totally destroyed, but the dome remained standing (see picture).

The demolition of Reams’ Turtle also demonstrated the durability of the monolithic dome structure. A wrecking ball demolished a strip several feet wide around the perimeter of the structure, without a collapse. When a doorway on one side was pulled down, the dome finally tipped over, and collapsed.

== Climate control ==
The monolithic dome, for a number of reasons, is very energy efficient. The spherical sections of the dome offer minimal surface area for the volume they contain, so there is less surface for heat transfer with the outside air. The one piece construction of the monolithic dome also eliminates many of the seams through which air can leak, though this is nullified to some degree in residential domes by the addition of multiple doors and windows. By placing the insulating foam on the outside of the concrete shell, the concrete acts as a thermal mass inside the building, reducing interior temperature fluctuations far more than the traditional home's insulation inside of a brick or stone veneer.

== Disadvantages ==
While the monolithic dome has numerous demonstrated engineering advantages, there are also some disadvantages, both engineering and social.

=== Engineering ===
- The techniques used in monolithic dome construction are very different from normal construction methods, so only specially trained construction crews are suited for building a dome using the modern techniques.
- The curved surfaces inherent to monolithic dome construction often result in oddly shaped rooms when divided up, which can result in wasted space in narrow corners. There are issues of wasted floor space due to wall curvature and problems fitting furniture, similar to those of Quonset huts. This effect can be minimized by constructing the dome on a stem wall, or by using an airform of such shape as to allow for straight, vertical walls at ground level.
- The monolithic dome's lack of seams may make it too well sealed; dehumidifiers are required in all but the driest climates.

=== Social ===
Social disadvantages of monolithic domes are to a large degree shared by geodesic domes, due to the similar shape and unorthodox construction. These disadvantages are:

- The radically different appearance of the domes also decreases the appeal for their use as private residences—the standard circular base does not fit well on small lots found in many areas, and the strange appearance and design may run afoul of neighborhood building covenants. Depending on the situation, a large variety of variations available from the standard circular shape can avoid some of these problems.
- Building permits may be difficult to obtain if local officials are not familiar with the monolithic dome.
- Resale of a monolithic dome home may be difficult because of its unconventional appearance.

== Construction records ==
The largest monolithic dome in the world is the home of Faith Chapel Christian Center in Birmingham, Alabama, which is 72 feet (22 m) tall, and 280 feet (85 m) in diameter. Inside is a floor area of 74,500 square feet (6,920 m^{2}) in two levels.

Some communities in the United States have chosen to use monolithic dome technology in the construction of new schools.

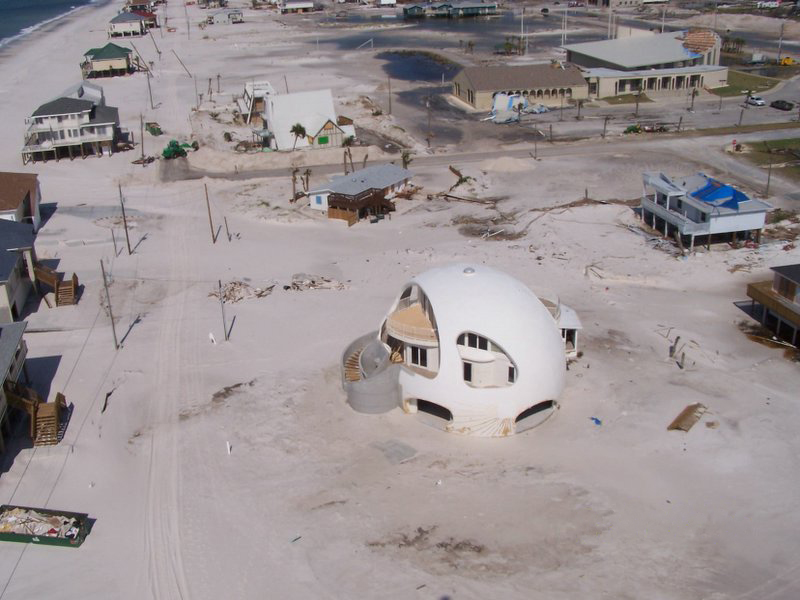
The monolithic "Dome of a Home", seen here after Hurricane Dennis in 2005, has withstood several hurricanes

A residential house, the monolithic "Dome of a Home" on Ariola Drive in Pensacola Beach, Florida, has experienced several hurricanes since it was built in 2003.

== See also ==
- Binishell
- Bubble Houses (Litchfield Park, Arizona)
- Hurricane-proof building
- Monolithic church
- Wallace Neff
- Xanadu House
