= Mike Moore (tight end) =

Former American football tight end

No. 85
- Position: Tight end

Personal information
- Born: c. 1957; Montgomery, Alabama, U.S.
- Listed height: 6 ft 1 in (1.85 m)
- Listed weight: 210 lb (95 kg)

Career information
- High school: Robert E. Lee (Montgomery, AL)
- College: Grambling (1975–1977)

Awards and highlights
- Third-team All-American (1977)

Michael Moore (born c. 1957) is a former American football tight end. He grew up in Montgomery, Alabama, and played football at Robert E. Lee High School. After receiving no scholarship offers from Alabama or Auburn, Moore enrolled at Grambling State University in Louisiana. He played college football for Eddie Robinson's Grambling State Tigers football teams from 1975 to 1977. In 1977, he led the Southwestern Athletic Conference with 40 receptions for 651 yards. As a junior in 1978, he ranked second nationally with 1,112 receiving yards and third nationally with 60 receptions. He was the first player in Grambling history to gain 1,000 receiving yards in a single season. He also received third-team honors from the Associated Press on the 1977 All-America college football team.
