= Bubble Houses (Litchfield Park, Arizona) =

Former Wallace Neff designed houses

General information
- Location: Litchfield Park, Arizona, United States
- Construction started: 1942
- Completed: 1944
- Client: Paul Litchfield

Technical details
- Structural system: Monolithic dome
- Size: base square footage

Design and construction
- Architects: Wallace Neff; builder Case Construction Co., San Pedro, California

The Bubble Houses, also known as the Goodyear Balloon Houses, were four (three single and one double) bubble or airform houses designed by Wallace Neff and built at the Wigwam Resort in Litchfield Park, Arizona, during the 1940s. They were demolished during the 1980s.

== History ==
Located in a row "on the fairway of the first hole of the Wigwam's golf course" at the Wigwam Resort in Litchfield Park, Arizona, a community developed by Goodyear. and built between 1942 and 1944 by Case Construction Company of San Pedro, California, the Bubble Houses were designed by architect Wallace Neff using his patented airform Monolithic dome system, consisting of reinforced concrete cast in place over an inflatable balloon made by the Goodyear Tire and Rubber Company. Once the outer shell of concrete and insulation had hardened, the balloon was removed. The Double Bubble House consisted of two single units joined by a conventional single-story structure. Each Bubble House contained two bedrooms and one bath, a kitchen, living room, pantry with refrigerator, and patio.

All four houses, intended as "alternative wartime housing", were similar to the twelve Neff-designed bubble houses, ten doubles and two singles, previously built by Case in Falls Church, Virginia. The houses were the subject of a 1944 Architectural Record article.

Described as "ideal accommodation for golfers", rates for staying in the Bubble Houses were set at US$42 per night, for two people, during the 1958–59 season. The houses were in use as rentals or employee-housing until the 1970s. In the 1980s Goodyear sold the Wigwam project and the new owners demolished all four bubble houses.

== See also ==
- Bubble Houses (Hobe Sound, Florida)

== Sources ==
- Belloli, Andrea, ed. (1989). Wallace Neff, 1895–1982: The Romance of Regional Architecture. San Marino, California: Huntington Library Press. ISBN 978-0-87328-128-7.
- Burton, Lance W. (2007). The Wigwam Resort. Images of America. Charleston, South Carolina: Arcadia Publishing. ISBN 978-0-7385-4825-8.
- Head, Jeffrey (2011). No Nails, No Lumber: The Bubble Houses of Wallace Neff (1st ed.). New York: Princeton Architectural Press. ISBN 978-1-61689-024-7.
- Weinberg, David (19 September 2013). "How to Build a Housing Bubble". Slate Magazine.
- Milwaukee Public Library STAFF (June 20, 2014). "The bubble houses of Wallace Neff are something to behold indeed. Take a look..." Milwaukee Public Library. Milwaukee County Federated Library System.
