= Michael D. Moore (evangelist) =

Michael D. Moore is the Senior Pastor and Founder of the 6400-member megachurch, Faith Chapel Christian Center and Mike Moore Ministries in Birmingham, Alabama. The church's 3,000-seat Word Dome is situated on approximately 140 acres.

In addition to his pastorate, Moore is the author of three books, God's Heavenly Banking System, Tithing: What A Difference A Dime Makes, and The Word Rich Is Not A Bad Word.

His church, Faith Chapel, has grown from the living room of his home in April 1981 to house its very large congregation today.
