= Wallace Neff =

American architect (1895–1982)

- Born: January 28, 1895; La Mirada, California
- Died: June 8, 1982 (aged 87); Pasadena, California
- Resting place: Mountain View Cemetery and Mausoleum, Altadena, California; 34.186734°N 118.1497°W
- Occupation: Architect
- Known for: Architect and designer of residences for Hollywood personalities
- Notable work: Pickfair
- Style: Mediterranean Revival architecture, Spanish Colonial Revival architecture
- Spouse: Louise U. Neff

Edwin Wallace Neff (January 28, 1895 – June 8, 1982) was an American architect based in Southern California and was largely responsible for developing the region's distinct architectural style referred to as "California" style. Neff was a student of architect Ralph Adams Cram and drew heavily from the architectural styles of both Spain and the Mediterranean as a whole, gaining extensive recognition from the number of celebrity commissions, notably Pickfair, the mansion belonging originally to Mary Pickford and Douglas Fairbanks.

== Early years ==
Edwin Wallace Neff was born January 28, 1895, to Edwin Neff and Nannie McNally, daughter of Chicago printing tycoon Andrew McNally (Rand-McNally Corporation). Since Andrew McNally moved to Altadena, California, in 1887, and founded Rancho La Mirada, La Mirada, California, would be Neff's birthplace. However, he spent a great deal of time at the Altadena residence, a grand Queen Anne Victorian mansion that looked from the hillside community down to the Pacific Ocean. At age nine, Wallace moved to Europe with his family, only to return to the U.S. at the outbreak of World War I.

== Developing career ==
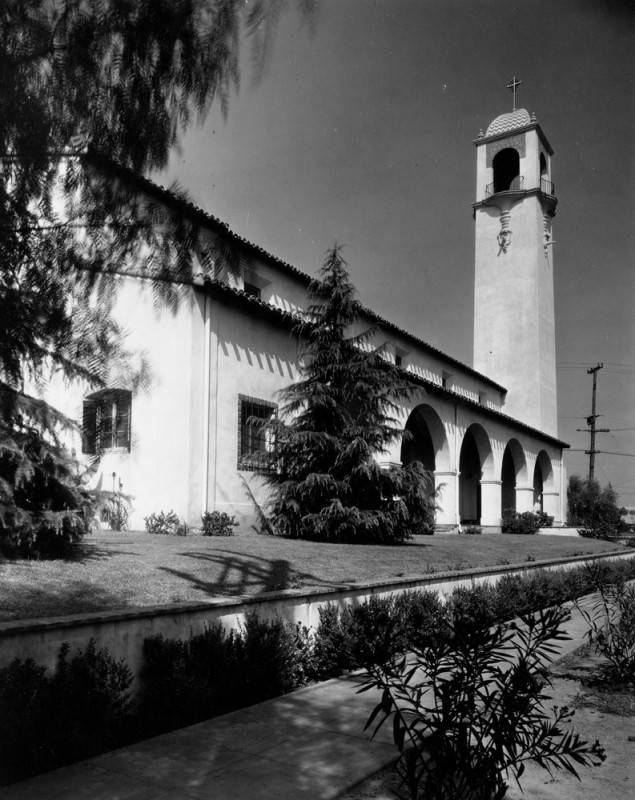
St. Elizabeth of Hungary Roman Catholic Church, Altadena, California, c. 1928

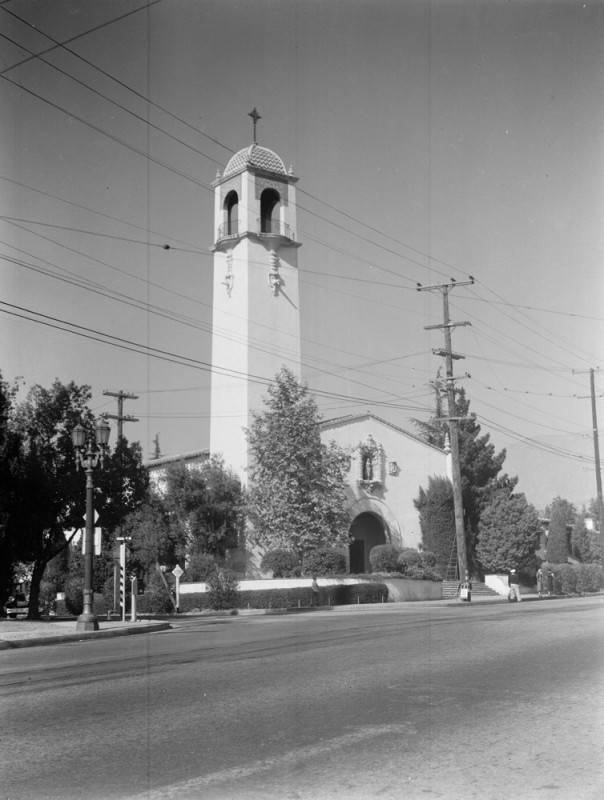
St. Elizabeth, c. 1935

His interest in architecture saw him studying under the revered Ralph Adams Cram in Massachusetts. He eventually returned to California and took up residence in Altadena while serving as a shipyard draftsman in Wilmington. Eventually he found himself ready for the architectural realm creating designs of the Spanish Medieval period including his own home parish of St. Elizabeth of Hungary Roman Catholic Church, established 1918 in Altadena. His gift to the parish as well as the community was the design of the church building finished and dedicated in 1926.

The church is of Spanish Medieval design including a bell tower which is patterned after a Spanish watchtower. The view from its broad portals at 100 feet gave an enormous panorama not only of the Southern California countryside, now blocked by the since-built steeple of Westminster Presbyterian Church to its south, but an expansive view of the San Gabriel Mountains to its north, which boast peaks as high as 10,000 feet in altitude. The building is reminiscent of the Serra Missions with its arched south porch and terra cotta tiles. It has high stucco-on-concrete walls with small, high, stained glass windows. Below each window is a taller stained glass window with biblical depictions leaded into each one.

It boasts a Spanish tile roof and a massive plank wood arched front double door. The interior is vaulted to heights in excess of 50 feet. Across its ceiling are three broad rough-hewn trusses acting to support the gabled ceiling. In actuality, the building's superstructure is built of iron girders. Other details on the exterior are broad wing sweeping walls and exaggerated window sills with wooded bars. These features become an important part of his developing style. The Saint Elizabeth church building is the only house of worship ever designed by Neff, and has the distinction of being the oldest building in use for Catholic worship in the Greater Los Angeles area. To the parish plant Neff added the priests' rectory, the convent for the Holy Name Sisters who taught at the school, and a pet project, a shrine to Saint Theresa of Avila (1929) which features the true style of his architecture. This makes Saint Elizabeth Parish a rare collection of Wallace Neff works.

== California Style ==
Architectural historian Eleanor Schrader wrote "Neff's European training and keen eye for historical styles gave him the ability to combine Spanish, Tuscan, Mediterranean, Islamic, and other design elements that melded seamlessly into something he called 'The California Style.'" As Neff's style became more popular and demanded by the elite, the rich, and the famous, he moved to the exclusive Pasadena suburb of San Marino.

To his client list he added the Singer Mansion, Gillette Mansion, the Gates Residence, Libby Ranch, and the Pickfair Estate. Other fine mansions line the streets of Chapman Woods, Hancock Park, San Marino, Glendora, Beverly Hills, San Pascual Avenue, California Street and others in lower East Pasadena.

Neff's Angelo Drive house for the film director Fred Niblo, Misty Mountain, features a distinctive circular driveway and has been virtually unchanged since its construction. It has since been owned by Jules Stein and latterly Rupert Murdoch.

In 1946 Neff designed the "airform" or "bubble" house, a distinctive form of inexpensive housing, a dome-shaped construction made of reinforced concrete that was cast in position over an inflatable balloon. (The balloon is the "airform", a portmanteau of "air" and "formwork".) Though the design did not gain support in the United States, it was used for large housing projects in Egypt, Brazil, and West Africa during the 1940s and 1950s. The Straus House was designed in 1970 by Neff at the end of his career for Macy's department store heir Robert K. Straus as a weekend retreat. The 1.53-acre (0.62 ha) site is on a bluff overlooking the Santa Barbara Channel in the Hope Ranch community, just north of the city of Santa Barbara.

Neff's 1934 Fredric March House was built for the actor Fredric March and subsequently owned by Wallis Annenberg. It was owned and sold by Brad Pitt and Jennifer Aniston in 2009. In 1998, actress Diane Keaton, an avid fan of Neff's work, purchased a low-slung Neff house in Beverly Hills – featured in Architectural Digest, July 1999 – with the front lawn covered in lavender, for $7.5 million. This home was later purchased by Madonna and Guy Ritchie, and was still in their possession as of 2007. In 1990, Bob Newhart purchased a Neff house in Bel Air for $4.2 million, subsequently selling it to Robert Quigg (developer) in 2016 for $14.5 million. Everett Phipps Babcock and Georgious Y. Cannon worked in Neff's office.

== Concrete dome structures ==
The first modern concrete monolithic dome structures were designed and built by Neff with US government funding in Falls Church, Virginia during World War II. A community of 12 concrete "bubble houses" were built to provide housing for defense workers. Nicknamed the "Igloo Village" by local residents, the structures were fabricated by pouring concrete over inflated rubber balloons resting on a concrete slab. After the concrete had set, the balloons were deflated and removed. Insulation, wire mess reinforcements and additional concrete were then added to complete the structures. Goodyear, which had provided the balloon forms for the construction later built a resort to Neff's design in Arizona using the same technology, see: Bubble Houses (Litchfield Park, Arizona)

== Partial list of works ==
- 1925 – Remodelling of Pickfair at 1143 Summit Drive, Beverly Hills
- 1925 – Falcon Lair at 1436 Bella Drive, Benedict Canyon
- 1926 – Misty Mountain at 1330 Angelo Drive, Beverly Glen
- 1926 – W. N. Caldwell Residence, 805 North Linden Drive, Beverly Hills
- 1928 – Villa del Sol d'Oro at 200 North Michillinda Avenue, Sierra Madre
- 1934 – Fredric March House at 1026 Ridgedale Road, Bel Air, Los Angeles.
- 1934 – Singer Mansion at 820 North Verano Drive, Glendora, California, Los Angeles County, California . - Remains privately owned. As of 2025, it's now for sale.
- 1938 – Sol Wurtzel House, 10539 Bellagio Road, Bel Air
- 1939 – Haldeman House at 10000 Sunset Boulevard, Holmby Hills
- 1944 – Bubble Houses, Litchfield Park, Arizona
- 1948 - Monastery of the Angels, Los Angeles, California
- 1951 – Remodelling of the Precious Blood Catholic Church, and addition of parish hall, 435 South Occidental Boulevard, Los Angeles
- 1963 – Fletcher Residence, 11100 Chalon Road, Los Angeles
- 1970 – Singleton Estate, 384 Delfern Drive, Los Angeles
