= Blobitecture =

Organic architectural style

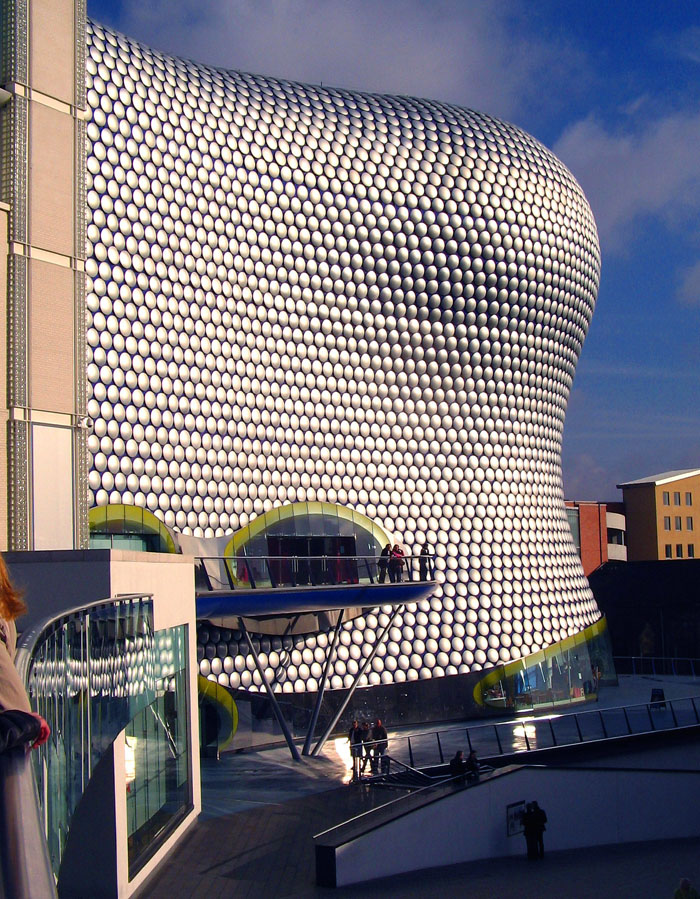
Future Systems' blobitecture design for the 2003 Selfridges Building department store was intended to evoke the female silhouette and a famous "chainmail" dress designed by Paco Rabanne in the 1960s.

Blobitecture (from blob architecture), blobism and blobismus are terms for a movement in architecture in which buildings have an organic, amoeba-shaped building form. Though the term blob architecture was already in vogue in the mid-1990s, the word blobitecture first appeared in print in 2002, in William Safire's "On Language" column in the New York Times Magazine. Though intended in the Safire article to have a derogatory meaning, the word stuck and is often used to describe buildings with curved and rounded shapes.

== Origins of the term "blob architecture" ==
The term "blob" was used by the Czech-British architect Jan Kaplický for the first time for the "Blob Office Building" in London in 1986. The building was characterized by an organic, aerodynamic shape and was touted for being energy-saving. 'Blob architecture' was coined by architect Greg Lynn in 1995 in his experiments in digital design with metaball graphical software. Soon a range of architects and furniture designers began to experiment with this "blobby" software to create new and unusual forms.

The word "blobitecture" itself is a portmanteau of the words "blob" and "architecture".

Despite its seeming organicism, blob architecture is not possible without computer-aided design programs. Architects derive the forms by manipulating algorithms on computer modeling platforms. Other computer-aided design functions used are the nonuniform rational B-spline or NURBS, freeform surfaces, and digitizing of sculpted forms similar to computed tomography.

== Precedents ==
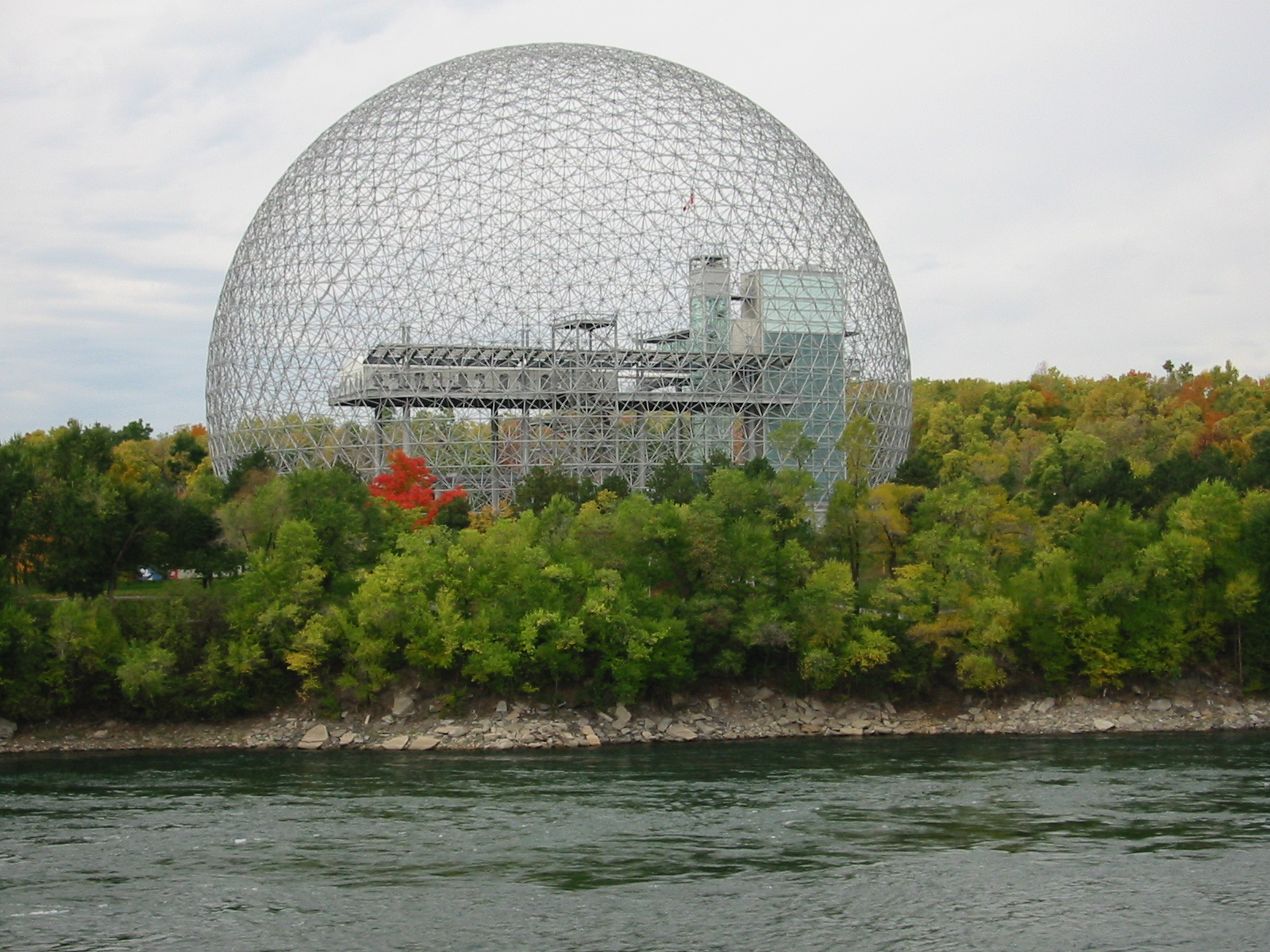
The Montreal Biosphère by Buckminster Fuller, 1967

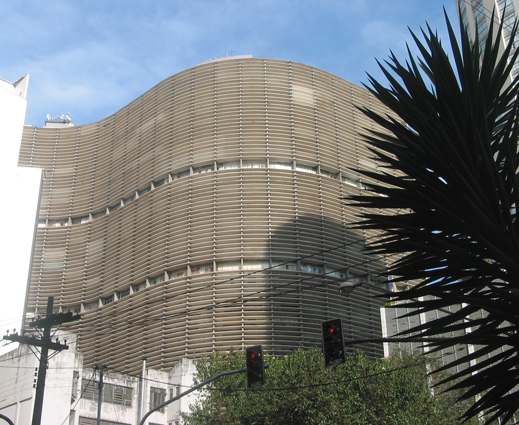
The Edificio Copan by Oscar Niemeyer, 1957

One precedent is Archigram, a group of English architects working in the 1960s, to which Peter Cook belonged. They were interested in inflatable architecture as well as in the shapes that could be generated from plastic. Ron Herron, also a member of Archigram, created blob-like architecture in his projects from the 1960s, such as Walking Cities and Instant City, as did Michael Webb with Sin Centre.

Buckminster Fuller's work with geodesic domes provided both stylistic and structural precedents. Geodesic domes form the building blocks for The Eden Project.

Niemeyer's Edificio Copan built in 1957 undulates asymmetrically, invoking the irregular non-linearity often seen in blobitecture. There was an air of psychedelia in the 1970s that these experimental architecture projects were a part of.

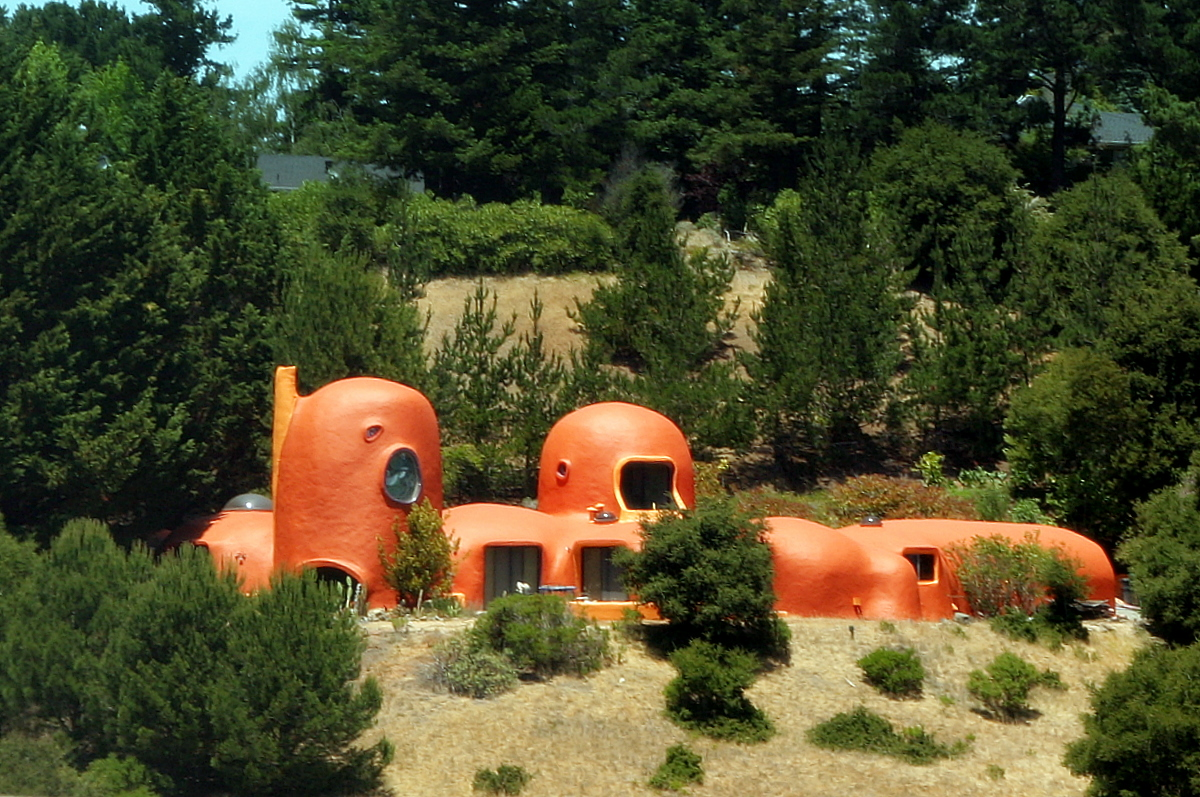
The Flintstone House in northern California

The Flintstone House by William Nicholson in 1976 was built over large inflated balloons. Frederick Kiesler's unbuilt Endless House is another instance of early blob-like architecture, although it is symmetrical in plan and designed before computers; his design for the Shrine of the Book (construction begun 1965) which has the characteristic droplet form of fluid also anticipates forms that interest architects today. Similarly, the work of Vittorio Giorgini (Casa Saldarini), Pascal Haüsermann, and especially that of Antti Lovag are examples of successfully built blobs. The latter built the famous Palais Bulles close to Cannes on the French Côte d'Azur, owned by fashion designer Pierre Cardin.

On the basis of form rather than technology, the organic designs of Antoni Gaudi in Barcelona and of the Expressionists like Bruno Taut and Hermann Finsterlin are considered to be blob architecture. The emergence of new aesthetic-oriented architectural theories like OOO have led contemporary architects to explicitly examine the formal-technological-theoretical implications of blobitecture, including digital-physical augmented reality works of architects like iheartblob.

== Built examples ==
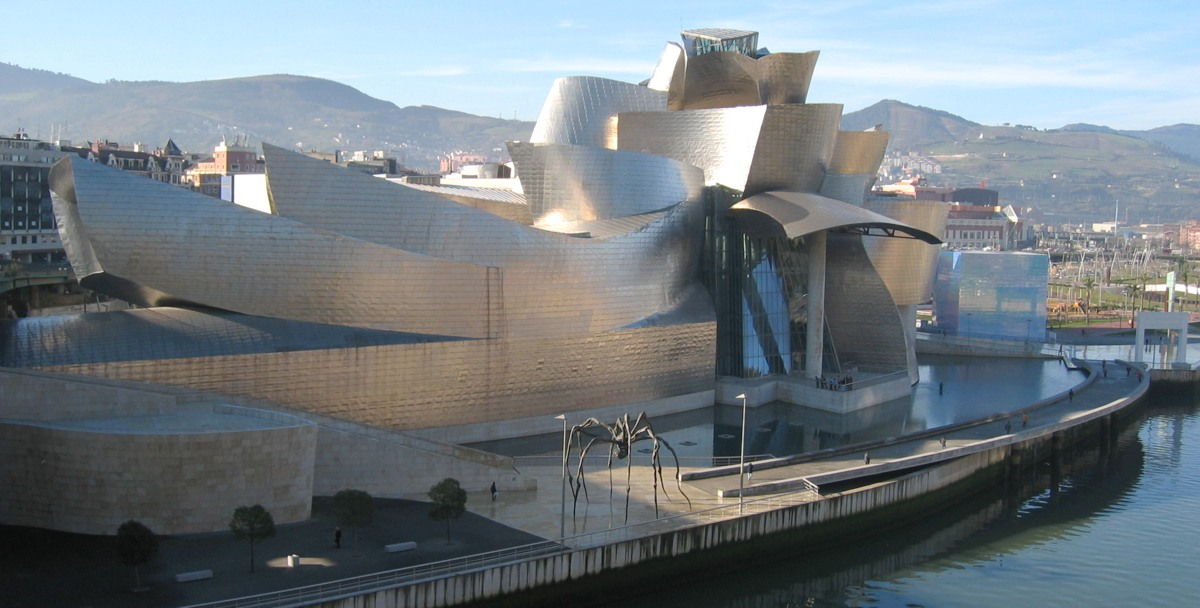
The Guggenheim Museum Bilbao, along the Nervión River, by Frank Gehry, 1997

The term, especially in popular parlance, has come to be associated with odd-looking buildings including Frank Gehry's Guggenheim Museum Bilbao (1997) and the Experience Music Project (2000). These, in the narrower sense, are not blob buildings, even though they were designed by advanced computer-aided design tools, CATIA in particular. The reason for this is that they were designed from physical models rather than from computer manipulations. The first full blob building was built in the Netherlands by Lars Spuybroek (NOX) and Kas Oosterhuis. Called the Water Pavilion (1993–1997), it has a fully computer-based shape manufactured with computer-aided design tools and an electronic interactive interior where sound and light can be transformed by the visitor.

A building that also can be considered an example of a blob is Peter Cook and Colin Fournier's Kunsthaus (2003) in Graz, Austria. Other instances are Roy Mason's Xanadu House (1979), and a rare excursion into the field by Herzog & de Meuron in their Allianz Arena (2005).

By 2005, Norman Foster had involved himself in blobitecture to some extent as well with his brain-shaped design for the Philological Library at the Free University of Berlin and The Glasshouse, Gateshead. French-born architect Ephraim Henry Pavie built the free-shaped Biomorphic House (2012) in Israel.

== Gallery ==
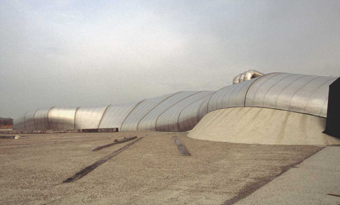
Water Pavilion by NOX/Lars Spuybroek, Netherlands, 1997

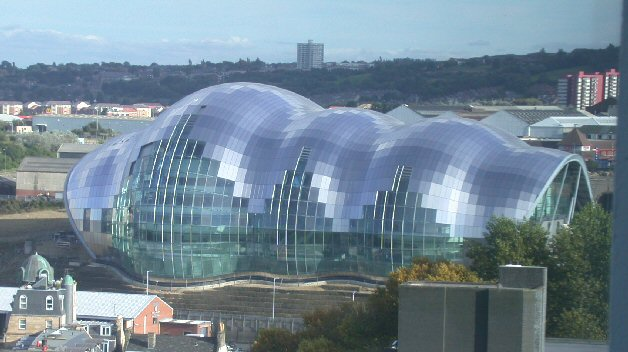
The Glasshouse, Gateshead building by Norman Foster, 2004

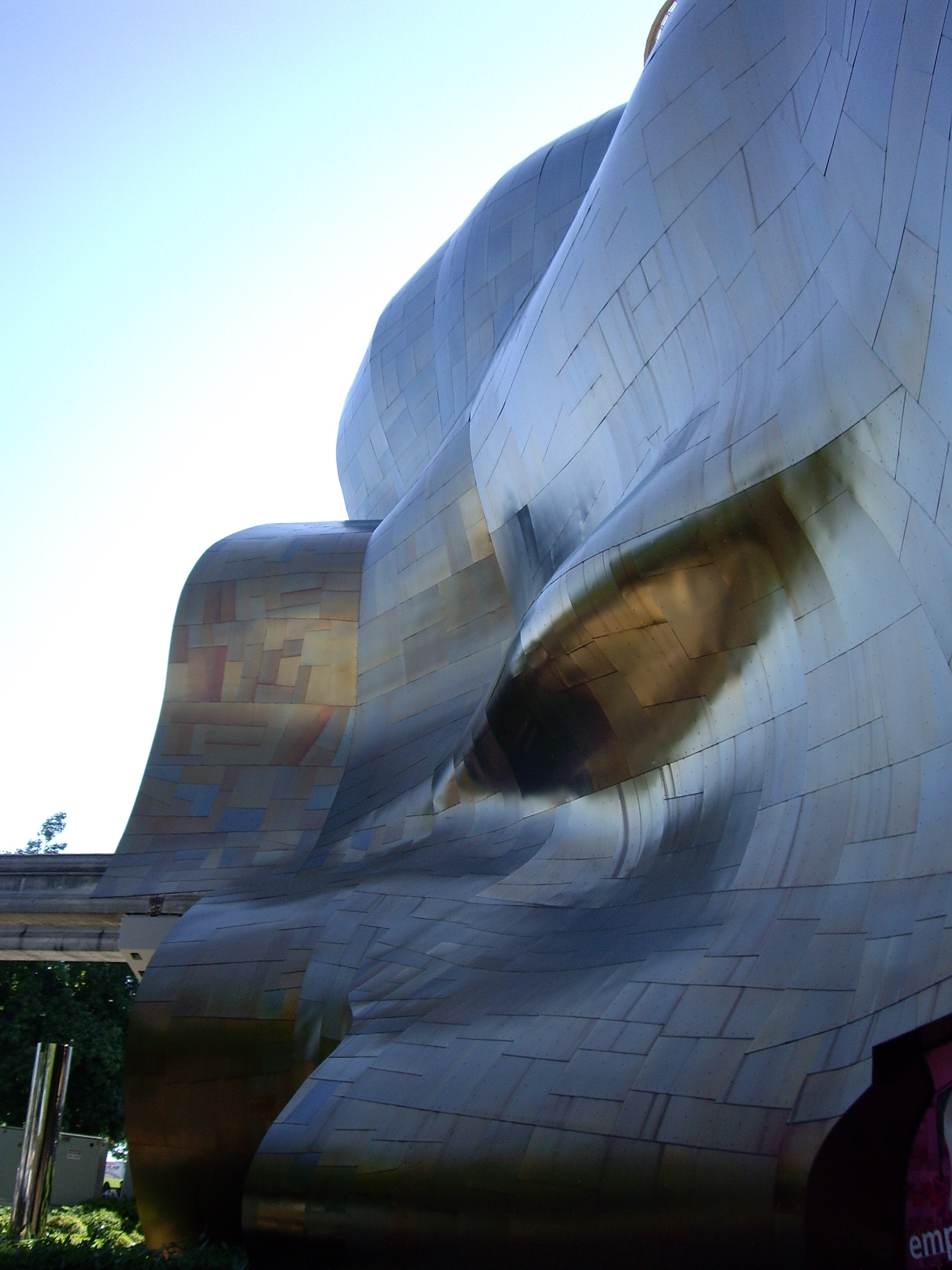
Museum of Pop Culture by Frank Gehry, Seattle, Washington

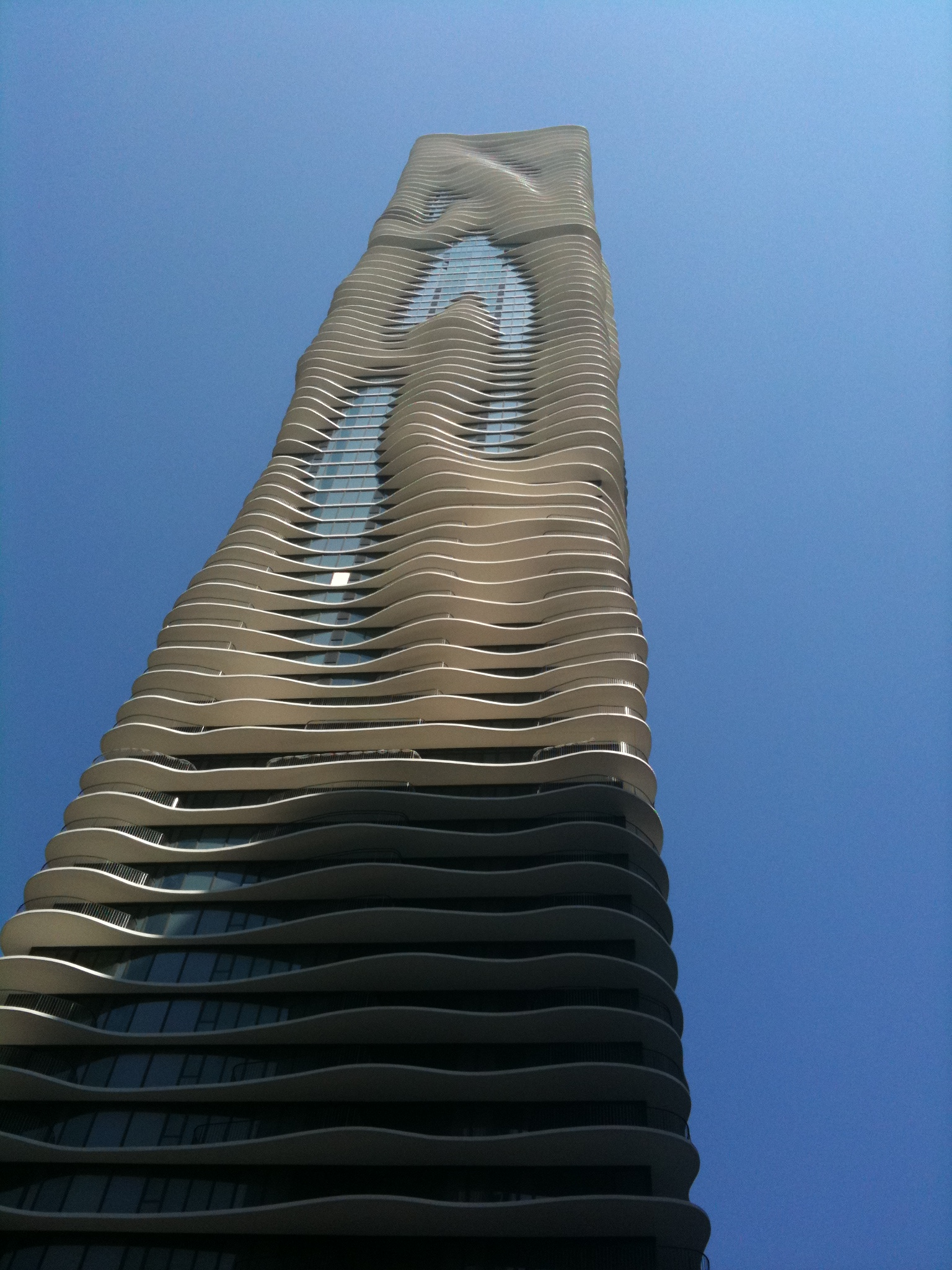
Aqua by Jeanne Gang, Chicago, Illinois

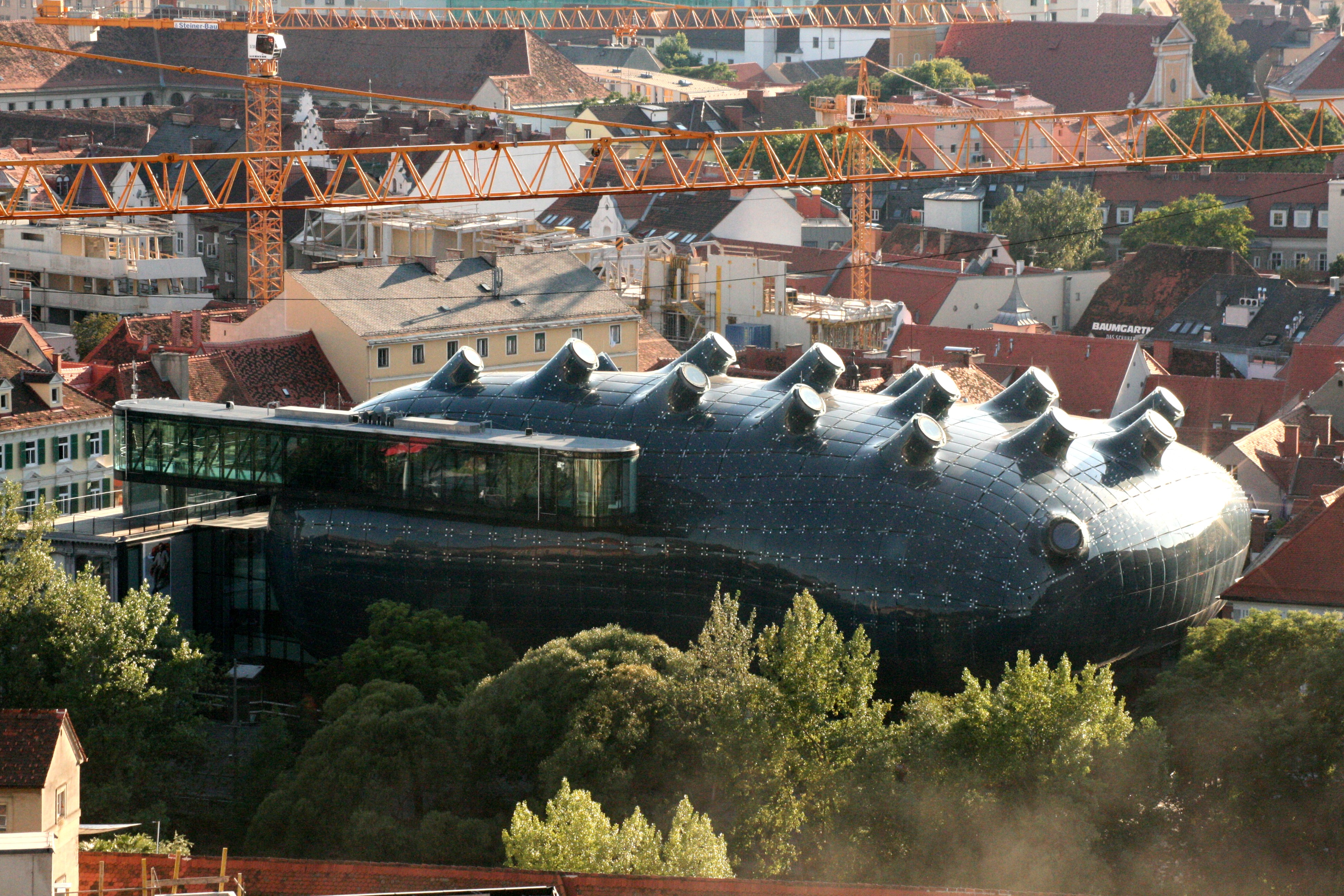
Peter Cook and Colin Fournier's Kunsthaus in Graz, Austria

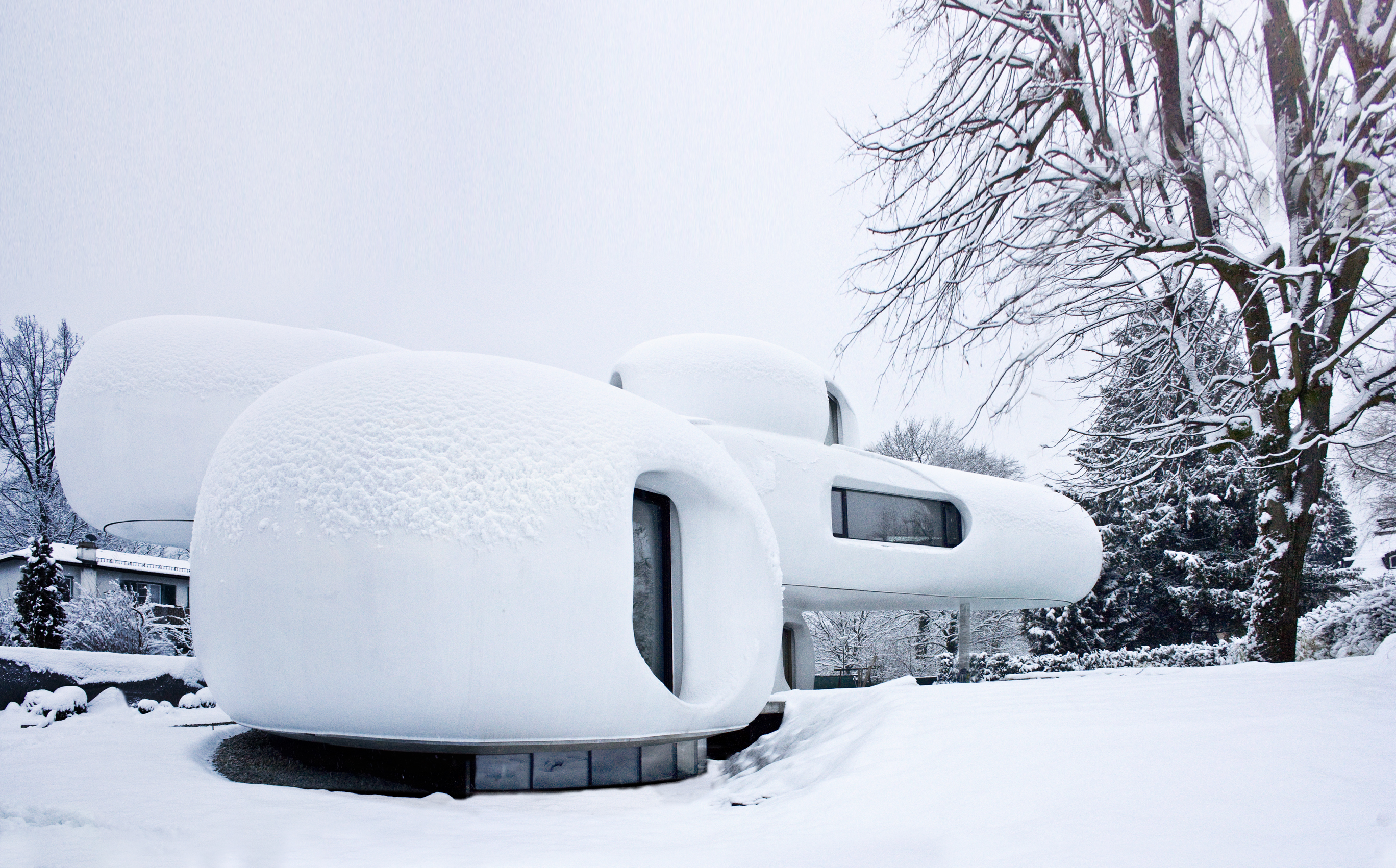
Living Sculpture in Salzburg, Austria, by Christine & Horst Lechner (under construction)

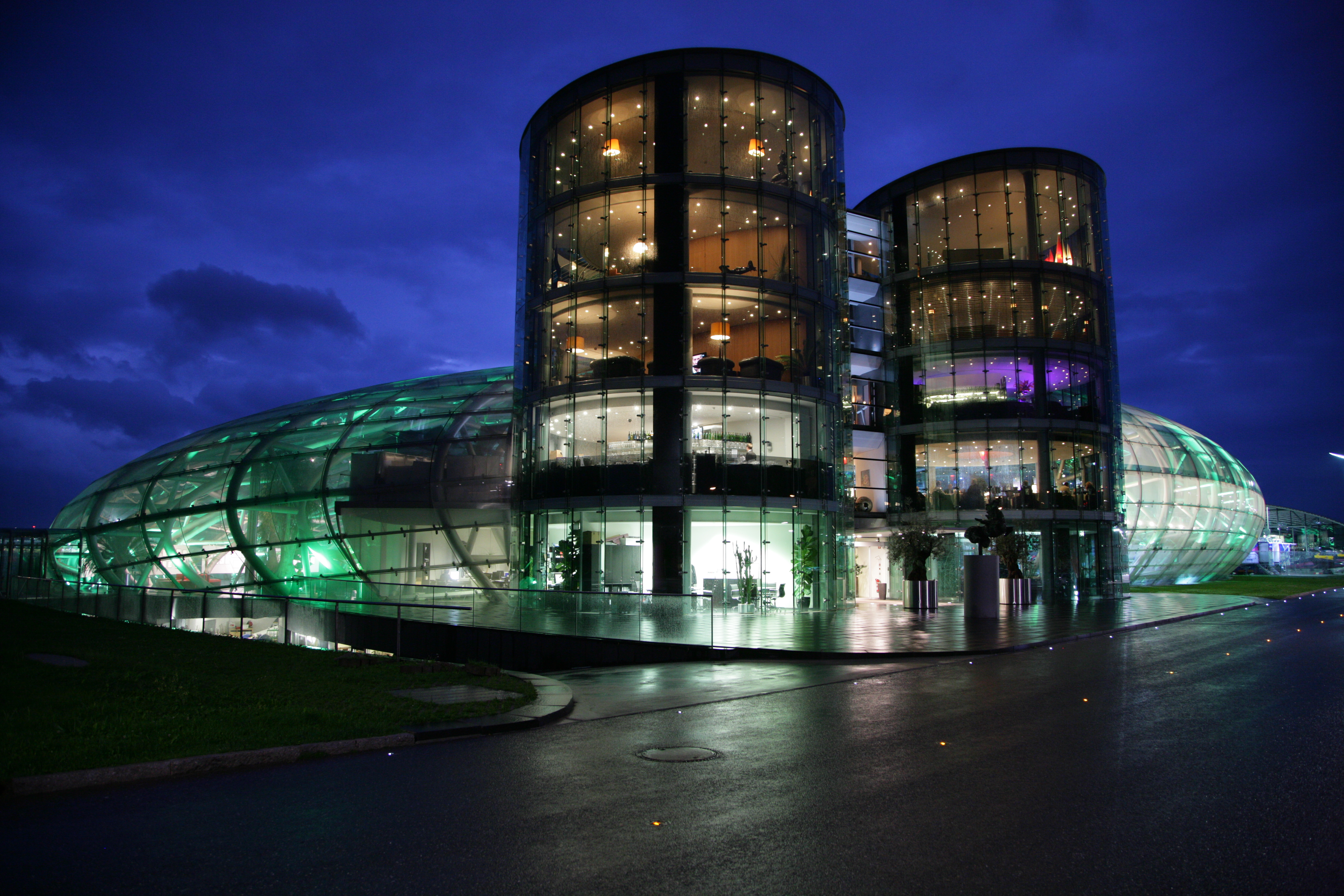
The Red Bull Hangar-7 in Salzburg, Austria, by Volkmar Burgstaller

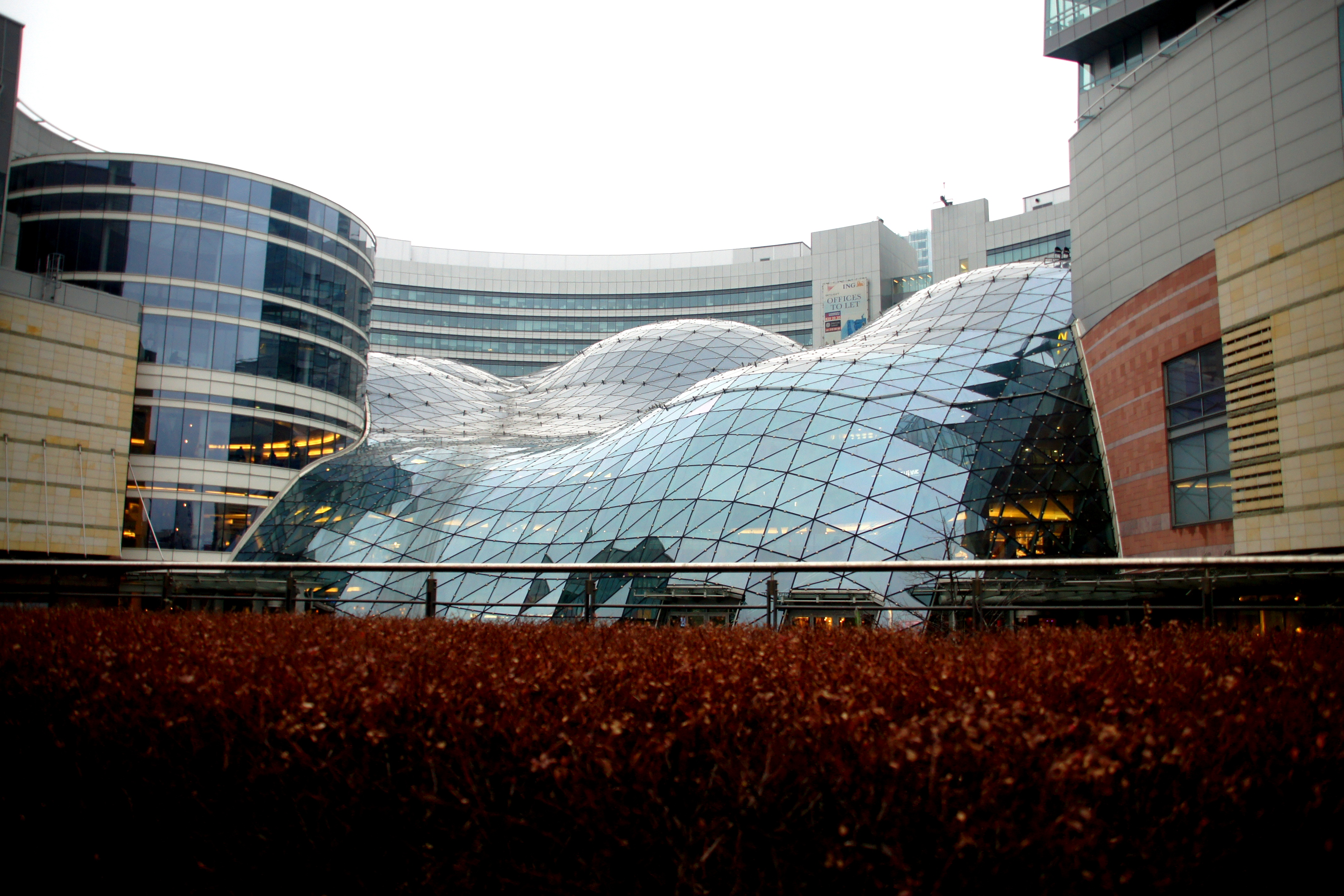
Golden Terraces by "The Jerde Partnership", Warsaw, Poland

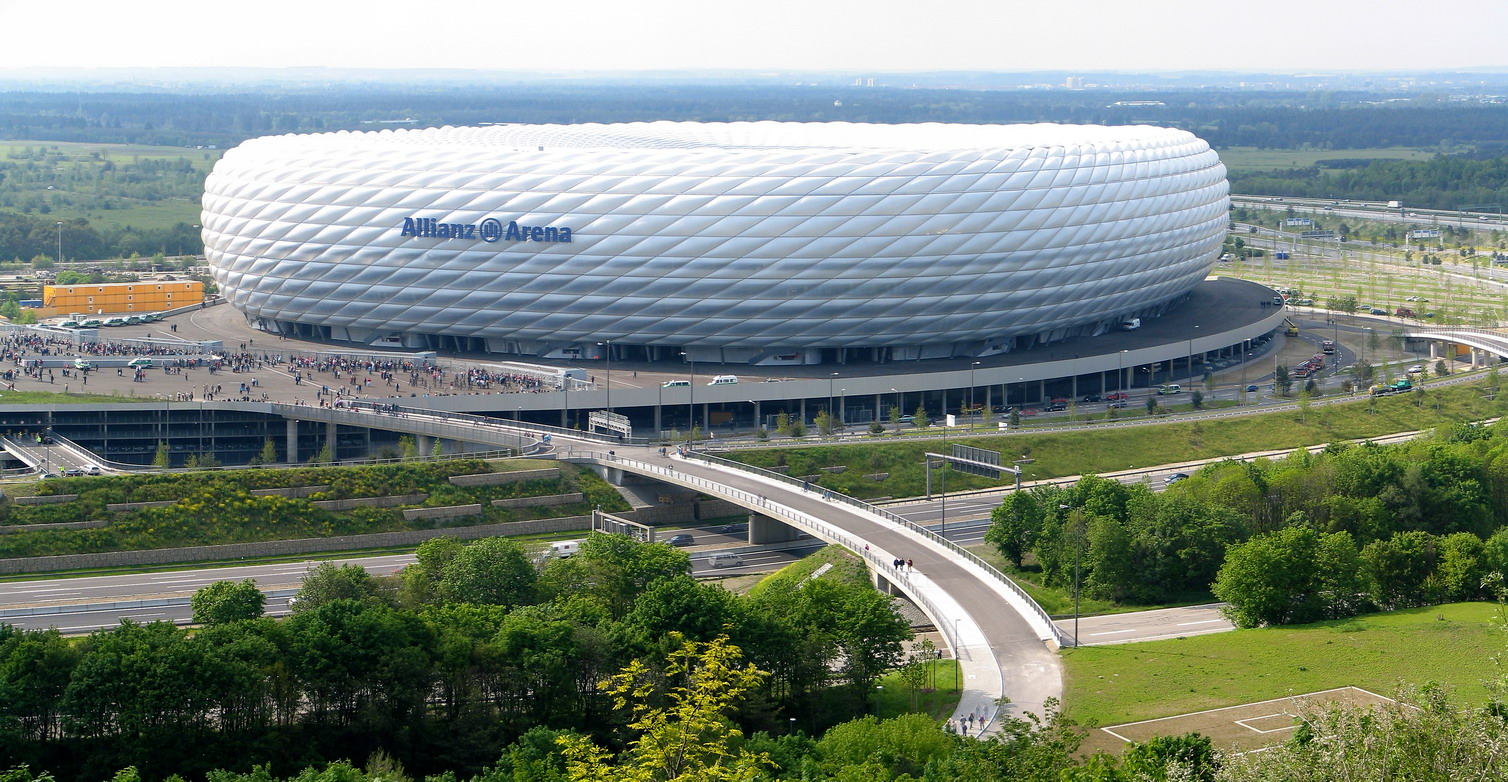
Allianz Arena by Herzog & de Meuron, Munich, Germany

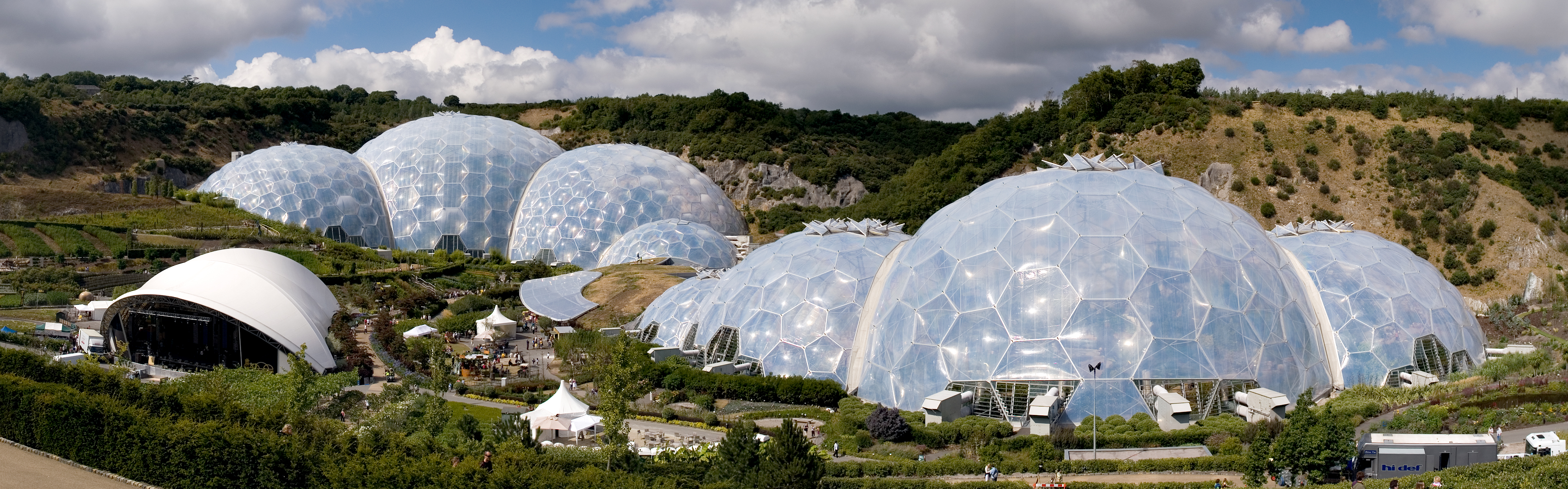
Eden Project by Nicholas Grimshaw, Cornwall, United Kingdom

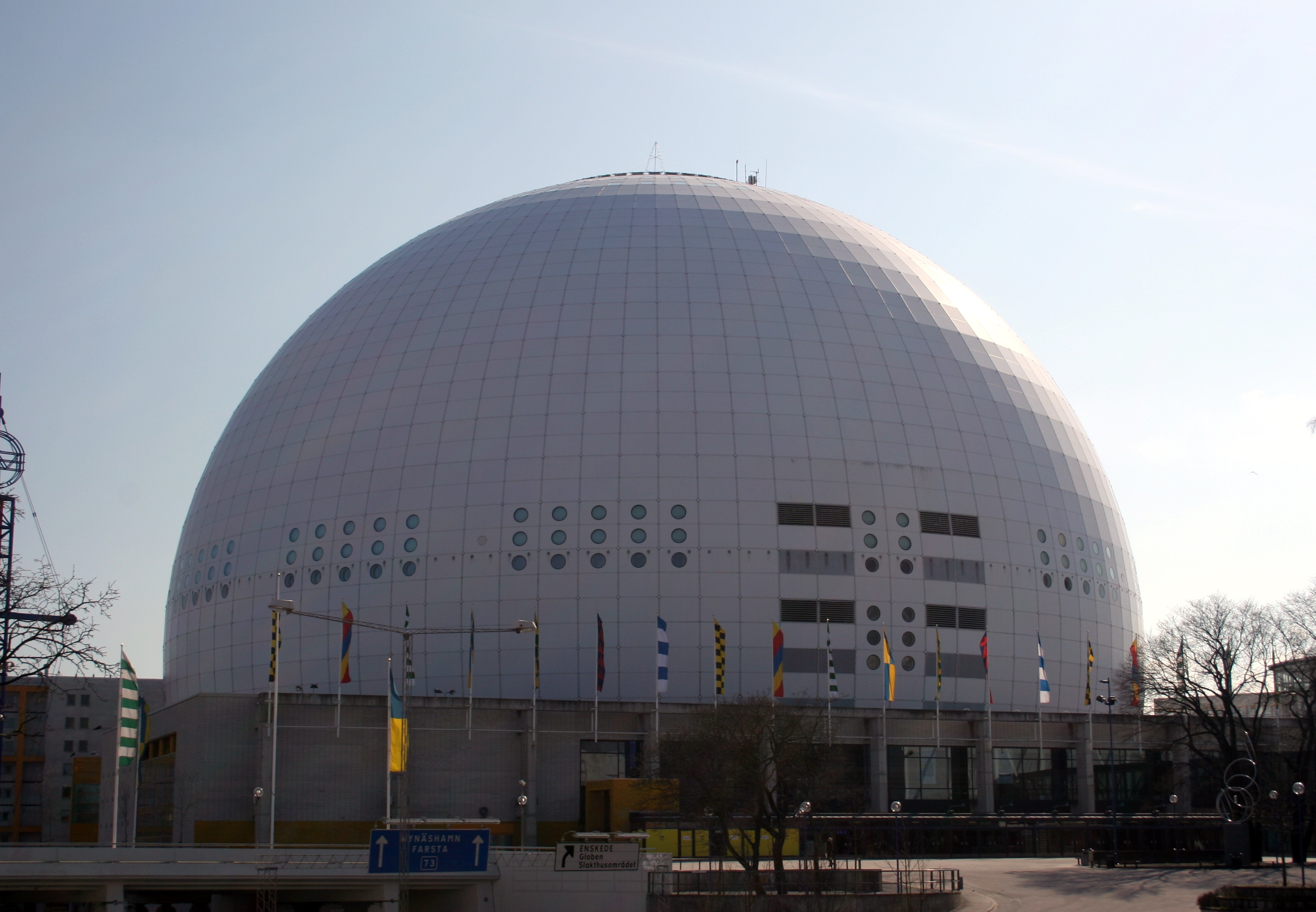
Ericsson Globe by Svante Berg & Lars Vretblad, Stockholm Sweden

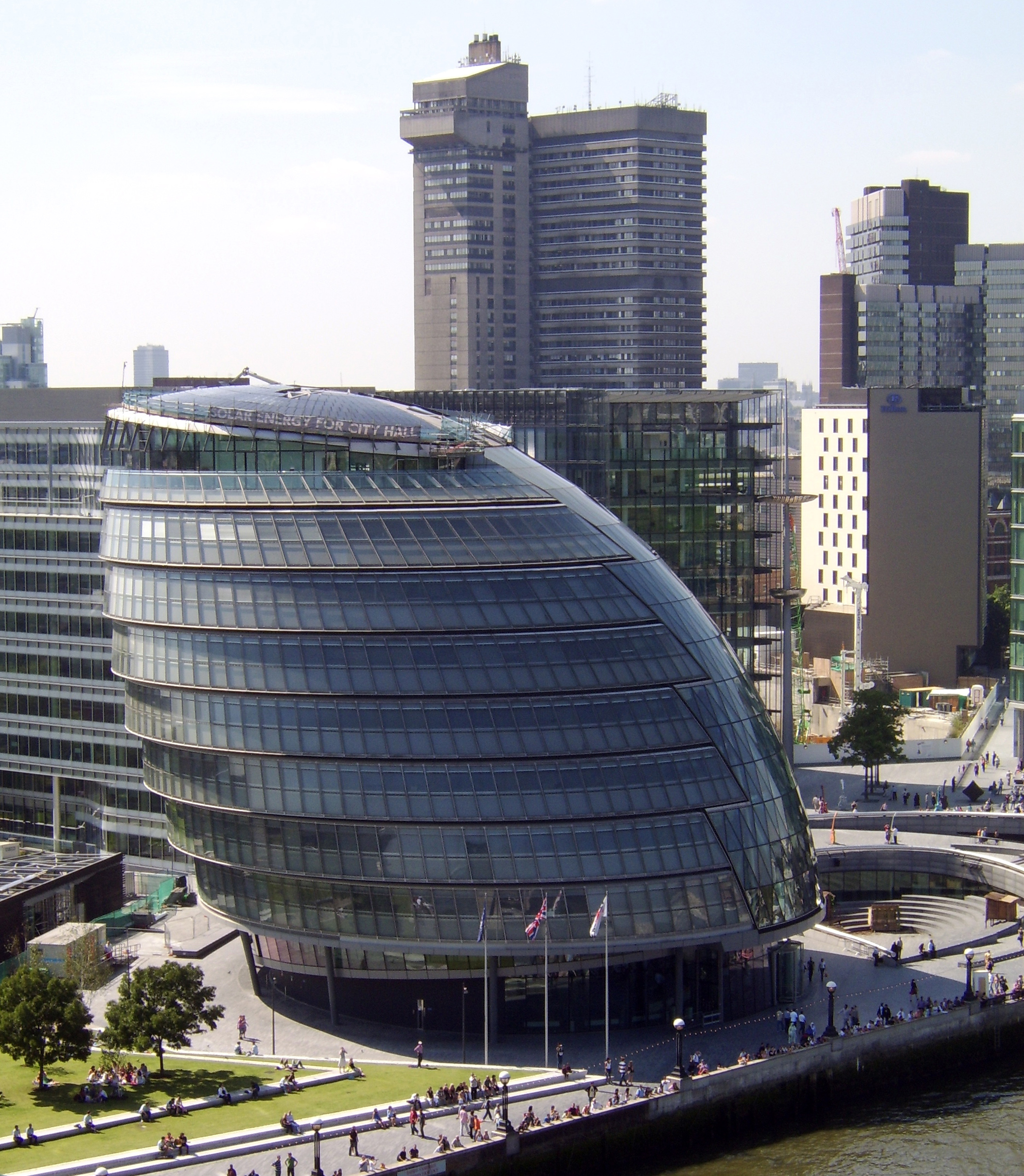
London City Hall by Sir Norman Foster, London, United Kingdom

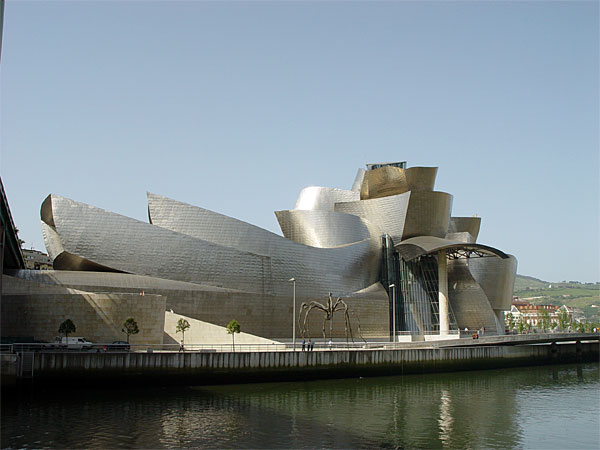
Guggenheim Museum by Frank Gehry, Bilbao, Spain

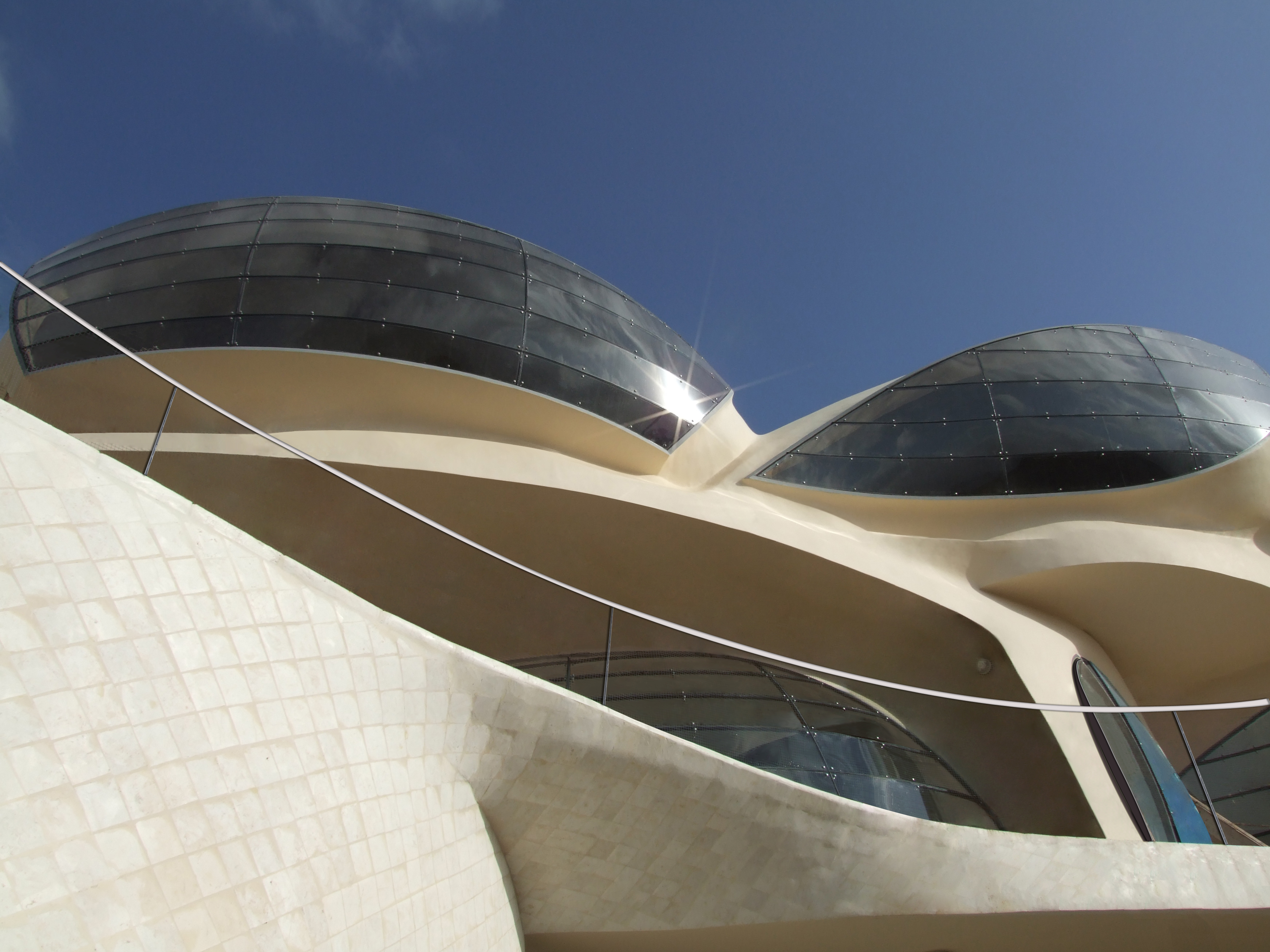
Biomorphic House, by Ephraim Henry Pavie, Neve Daniel, West Bank

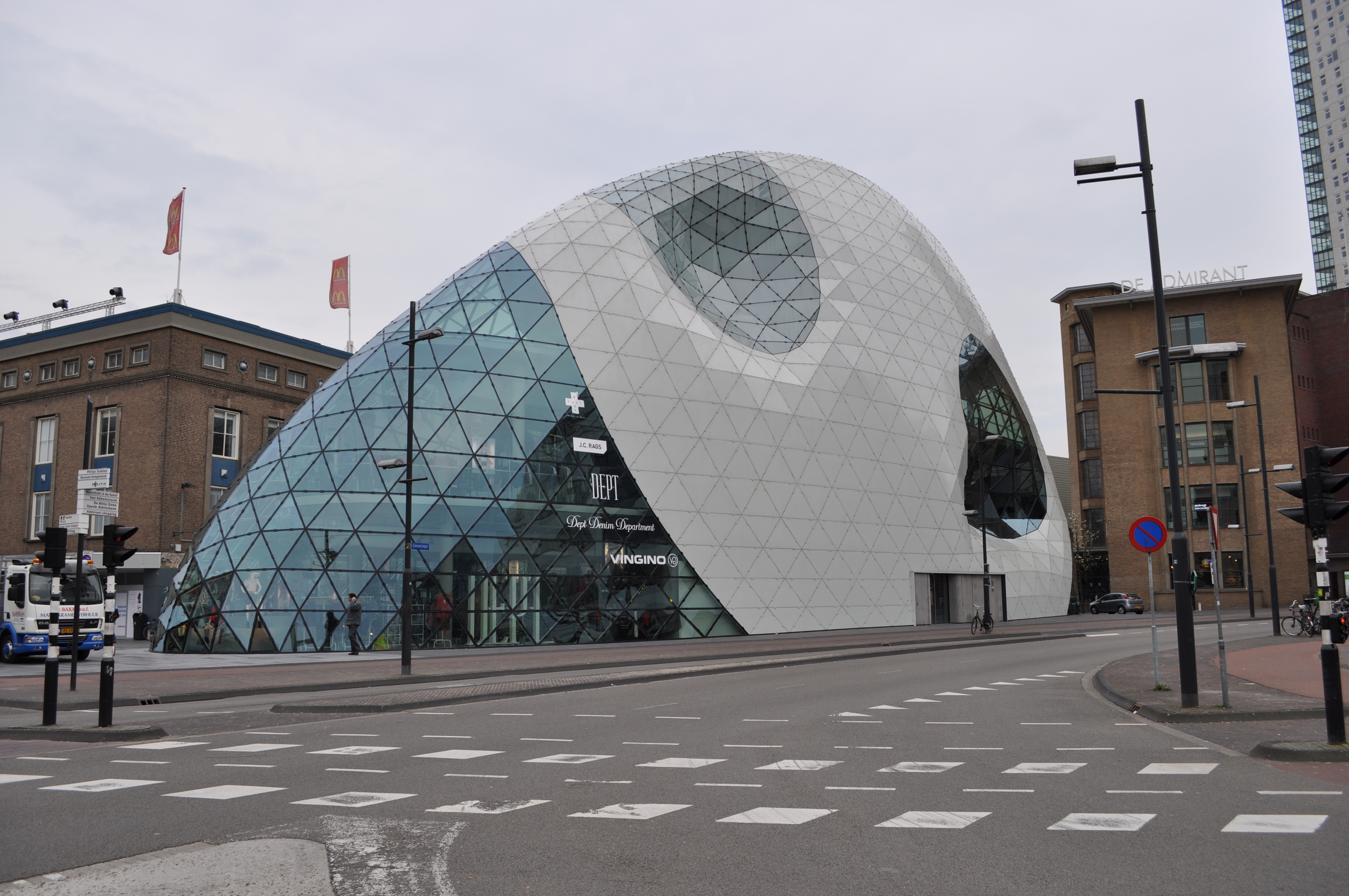
The Blob by Massimiliano Fuksas, Eindhoven, Netherlands

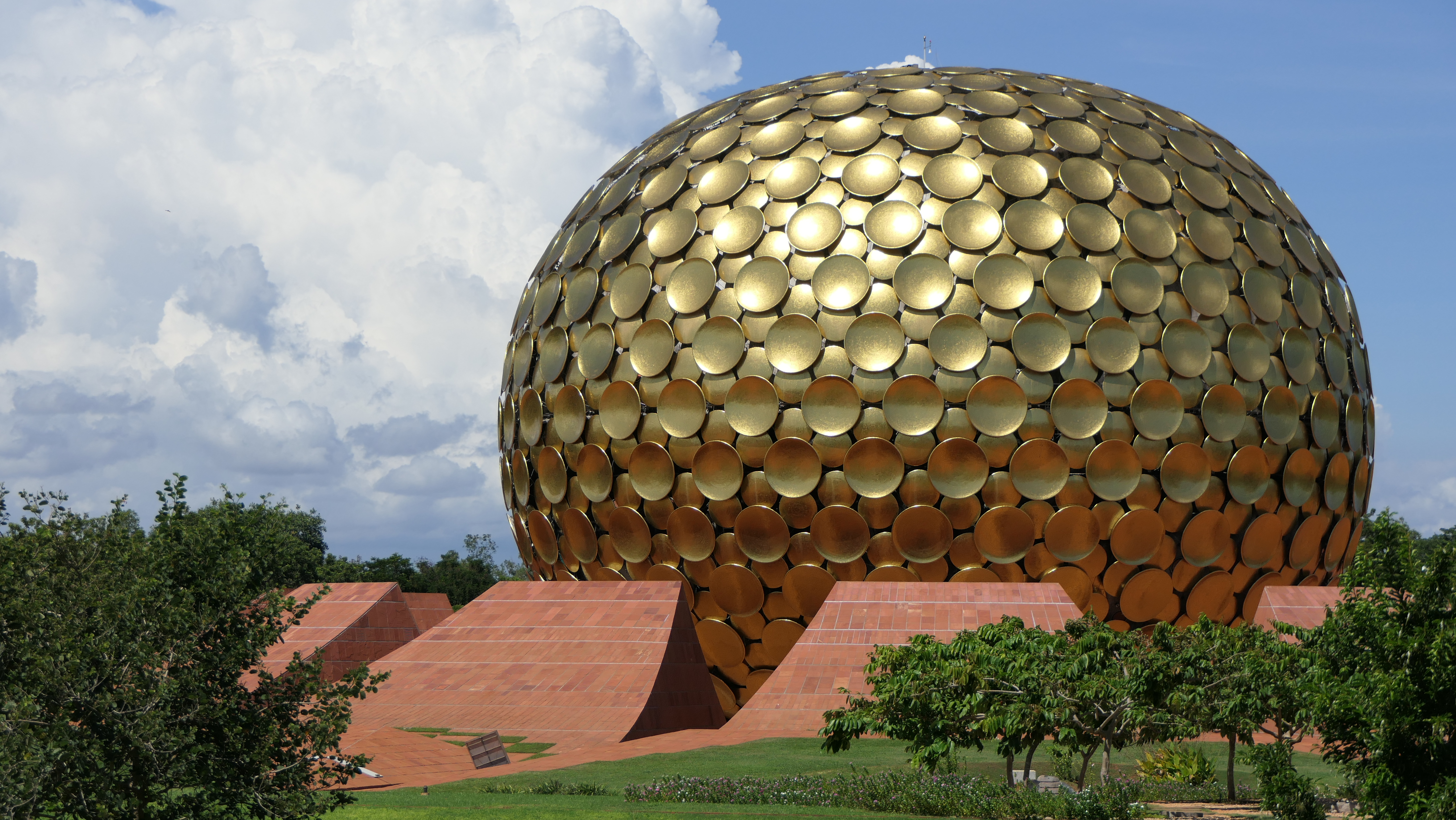
Matrimandir by Mirra Alfassa and Roger Anger, Tamil Nadu, India

== See also ==
- Blobject

== Sources ==
- Lynn, Greg. Folds, Bodies & Blobs : Collected Essays. La Lettre volée, 1998. ISBN
- Muschamp, Herbert. The New York Times, Architecture's Claim on the Future: The Blob. July 23, 2000.
- Safire, Wiliam. The New York Times: On Language. Defenestration. December 1, 2002.
- Waters, John K. Blobitecture: Waveform Architecture and Digital Design. Rockport Publishers, 2003. ISBN
- Margaret Wertheim (2004-03-13). "Prototype shows that buildings may someday be constructed by robots". Oakland Tribune. p. 2. Archived from the original on December 13, 2007.
