= Antje Majewski =

German artist and professor

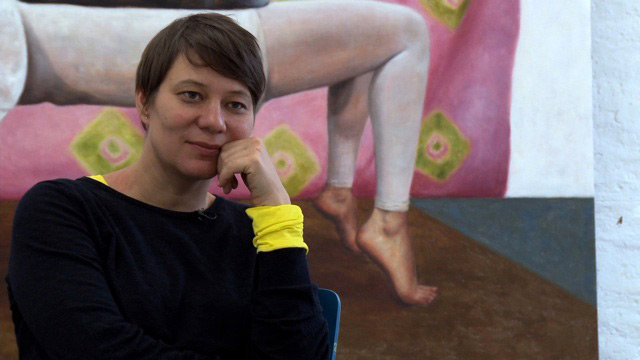
- Antje Majewski in The Future of Art (2010)
- Born: 1968 (age 57–58); Marl, North Rhine-Westphalia, Germany
- Education: Studied art history, history and philosophy in Cologne, Berlin, and Florence
- Employer: Braunschweig University of Art
- Known for: Painting, film, installation
- Notable work: The World of Gimel; Apple. An Introduction. (Over and over and once again); How to talk with birds, trees, fish, shells, snakes, bulls and lions
- Awards: Lingener Kunstpreis (1998)
- Website: www.antjemajewski.de

Antje Majewski (pronounced Ma-yev-ski; born 1968) is a German painter and contemporary artist. Her research-based practice bridges art, ecology, anthropology, and philosophy, and often unfolds through long-term projects that combine painting with film, installation, and collaborative formats. Majewski explores relationships between people, objects, plants, and histories, addressing themes of ecological change, cultural transformation, and collective knowledge. Her major projects include The World of Gimel (2009–ongoing), Apple. An Introduction. (Over and over and once again) (2010–2015), and How to talk with birds, trees, fish, shells, snakes, bulls and lions (2018). In 2023 she presented The Man Who Disappeared / Amerika at neugerriemschneider, Berlin, a project linking human migration history and colonialism with artificial intelligence-assisted painting. Majewski has exhibited at institutions including Hamburger Bahnhof, Kunsthaus Graz, and the Museum of Contemporary Art, Antwerp, and her works are held in the collections of the San Francisco Museum of Modern Art and Museum of Art, Łódź. She is Professor of Painting at the Braunschweig University of Art.

== Early life and education ==
Majewski was born in Marl, North Rhine-Westphalia, in 1968. From 1987 to 1995 she studied art history, history, and philosophy in Cologne, Berlin, and Florence.

== Practice and projects ==
Majewski’s practice combines painting with long-term, research-based projects that often involve collaboration with other artists, scientists and knowledge holders. Her works explore the agency of objects, ecological transformation, and cultural narratives of plants, ecosystems and artifacts.

=== Painting ===
Majewski works primarily in painting, often combining realist and surrealist modes. Her canvases frequently depict objects such as stones, plants, shells, and apples, which act as characters in unfolding narratives. Critics have noted that her approach links figuration to anthropology and ecology, bridging traditional pictorial forms with research into cultural and natural histories.

=== Apple. An Introduction. (Over and over and once again) ===
In 2010 Majewski initiated Apple. An Introduction. (Over and over and once again) with Polish conceptual artist Paweł Freisler. The still-ongoing project combines her own paintings of historic apple varieties with Freisler’s carved apples, her film The Freedom of Apples, and workshops and planting projects with local communities. It has been presented at Museum of Art, Łódź, Abteiberg Museum in Mönchengladbach, and other venues. A book of the same title was published in 2015 with contributions from artists, curators, and ecological collectives.

=== How to talk with birds, trees, fish, shells, snakes, bulls and lions ===
In 2018 Majewski presented the solo exhibition How to talk with birds, trees, fish, shells, snakes, bulls and lions at Hamburger Bahnhof in Berlin. Alongside her own paintings, films, and installations, she invited contributions from artists, Indigenous groups, and activist collectives from Brazil, Cameroon, China, Colombia, Poland, Senegal, and Hungary. The exhibition addressed interspecies communication and ecological change, and reflected her interest in creating layered, collaborative frameworks within the context of a major institutional solo presentation. Contributors included Agnieszka Brzeżańska & Ewa Ciepielewska, Carolina Caycedo, Paweł Freisler, Olivier Guesselé-Garai, Tamás Kaszás, Paulo Nazareth, Guarani-Kaiowá & Luciana de Oliveira, Issa Samb, Xu Tan, and Hervé Yamguen.

=== The World of Gimel ===
Since 2009 Majewski has been developing The World of Gimel, a long-term project that links painting, film, and research. A central part of the work was presented in the exhibition The World of Gimel: How to Make Objects Talk at Kunsthaus Graz (2011–2012). The project revolves around a set of objects, including a meteorite, that serve as points of departure for her paintings, films, and texts. It incorporates contributions from artists and theorists such as Jimmie Durham, Issa Samb, and Agnieszka Polska. Frieze described the project as exploring “how objects speak” and how cultural histories are embedded in things.

=== The Museum in the Garage ===
In 2014 Majewski, together with curator Sebastian Cichocki, presented The Museum in the Garage at Deutsche Bank Kunsthalle, Berlin and Galerija Pola Magnetyczne in Warsaw.

=== My Very Gestures ===
In autumn 2008 the Salzburger Kunstverein presented Antje Majewski: My Very Gestures, the artist’s first comprehensive solo exhibition in Austria. The exhibition brought together works from the previous decade exploring gesture, dance, expression, and costume. Majewski became known for her series of realist paintings that addressed existential themes such as friendship, love, masquerade, and death, and the ways individuals develop in relation to society, history, and social norms.

Several of the works were based on staged photographs, a method Majewski had begun as a teenager when she created photo stories with her sisters. For these images she designed costumes, sets, and face painting, later expanding the approach into dance-theatre works and films in which stagings were realized through performance. At My Very Gestures, paintings, films, sculpture, and costume were installed in dialogue, creating an immersive environment. Elements of Berlin’s Wedding district were transposed to Salzburg in collaboration with the Berlin artist Juliane Solmsdorf. The exhibition was accompanied by a publication released by Sternberg Press in New York and Berlin.

=== The Man Who Disappeared / Amerika ===
In 2023 Majewski presented The Man Who Disappeared / Amerika at neugerriemschneider, Berlin, following a residency at Villa Aurora in Los Angeles. The exhibition was based on letters written by her great-great-granduncle, the artist Georg Pflugradt. Majewski combined these sources with a video retracing his journey in reverse across the United States and a series of AI-assisted paintings titled Unreliable Images. ArtReview described the paintings as “somewhere between creepy and inert, edged with self-criticality.”

== Other activities ==
=== Work with collectives ===
Majewski has been a founding member of feminist and collaborative collectives. In 2010 she co-initiated E.F.A. im Garten, a project in Berlin that combined art, ecology, and community gardening. In 2012 she co-founded the collective ff, active until 2015, which developed experimental formats for discussion, screenings, and collective research. ff organized Temporäre Autonome Zone (2012–2014), a multi-part, temporary project space in Vienna, Berlin and elsewhere that hosted exhibitions and performances. The collective was profiled in Missy Magazine for its feminist and cooperative approach.

=== Curatorial projects ===
Majewski has curated and co-curated projects including Atomkrieg (with Ingo Niermann, Kunsthaus Dresden, 2004), Splendor Geometrik (with Anke Kempkes, Galerie Gisela Capitain, 2004), Temporäre Autonome Zone (with ff, 2012–2014), ANGST, KEINE ANGST / FEAR, NO FEAR (Times Art Center, Berlin, 2021), and Superhost: Antje Majewski (Museum of Contemporary Art, Antwerp, 2024).

=== Teaching ===
From 2011 to 2023 Majewski taught painting at the Muthesius Academy of Art in Kiel. In 2023 she was appointed professor of painting at the Braunschweig University of Art.

== Exhibitions ==
Majewski has exhibited internationally, with solo shows at Kunsthalle Basel, Kunsthaus Graz, Hamburger Bahnhof in Berlin, Salzburger Kunstverein, and the commercial gallery neugerriemschneider, Berlin. She has also participated in group exhibitions at major institutions including Museum of Contemporary Art, Antwerp, Martin-Gropius-Bau Berlin, Bundeskunsthalle Bonn, Kunstmuseum Thun, and KunstHausWien.

== Recognition ==
In 1998 Majewski received the Lingener Kunstpreis. Her work has been discussed in publications including Frieze (magazine), Artforum, ArtReview, Missy Magazine, Die Tageszeitung, and the Berliner Morgenpost.

== Notable works in public collections ==
Her works are in the collections of:

- San Francisco Museum of Modern Art (SFMOMA)
- Muzeum Sztuki, Łódź

== Personal life ==
Majewski lives and works in Berlin and Himmelpfort, Germany. Her father, Frank Majewski (1941–2001), was a pediatrician and professor of human genetics, known for identifying syndromes such as Lenz–Majewski syndrome and Majewski's polydactyly syndrome.
