= Ingo Niermann =

German writer (born 1969)

- Born: 1969 (age 56–57); Bielefeld, West Germany
- Occupations: writer, novelist, artist
- Writing career
- Genre: Cultural design
- Literary movement: Postmodern; Utopian
- Website: ingoniermann.com

Ingo Niermann (born 1969, Bielefeld, West Germany) is a German novelist, writer, and artist.

== Biography ==
Niermann was born in Bielefeld and studied philosophy in Berlin. He has lived in Berlin, to the eastern part of which he allegedly moved in late 1989. Niermann lived in New York from 2013 to 2014, before moving to Basel, Switzerland, where he is currently based.

== Publications ==
Although mostly known for his book releases (see below), Niermann earlier contributed to German newspapers Sueddeutsche Zeitung and Frankfurter Allgemeine Zeitung. He has also conducted interviews for German literary magazine Der Freund and contributed a series of interviews labelled Die Beste aller Welten [~ "The best of all worlds imaginable"] to the German art magazine Monopol.

In 1999, Niermann first contributed a short story (10 000 Jahre [10,000 years]) to the anthology "Mesopotamia" edited by Swiss writer Christian Kracht. His debut novel Der Effekt was published in 2001. It were mainly these two publications that established a perceived link with Germany's 1990s "pop literature" movement.

Niermann successfully veered from this perception with his acclaimed 2003 book Minusvisionen [best translated as "Negative-only visions"; also a neologism in German], published by Suhrkamp. The book revived the literary form of the protocol (German "Protokoll"), drawing on motives of interview and oral history. It chronicles the visions, projects and (economic) failure of several young German entrepreneurs.

In 2006, Umbauland appeared, also at Suhrkamp. It presents ten ideas of Niermann – partly conceived with friends and colleagues – on how Germany could be and should be radically reformed. Suggestion include the construction of a large-scale pyramid as tourist attraction and grave site in Eastern Germany, nuclear armament, or a radical re-vamping of the German language ("Rededeutsch").

Late February 2007 saw the publication of Metan ["Methane", misspelled], the product of teaming up with Christian Kracht and climbing up Kilimanjaro. The book describes the mysterious power of methane gas. Another reviewer refers to the book as a parody of "alarmism" and suggested it should be taken as a joke: "But if this book is taken as a joke, it probably is not a bad one." It has been translated into several languages, such as Latvian and Russian.

Scholarly voices have suggested to read particularly Metan but also Niermann's other offerings as indication of a camp take on public and political issues.

As a result of two stays in Beijing, China, Niermann published another chronicle book, China ruft Dich (China is calling you) in early 2008. The book records the stories, experiences and perceptions of German and other non-Chinese expatriates who have decided to pursue life in rapidly changing China of the 00 years. Niermann flanks these reports (or protocols) with Chinese views, for example by artist Ai Weiwei.

Also in 2008, Niermann's take on the miscellanea wave, entitled The Curious World of Drugs (Breites Wissen) and co-authored with journalist Adriano Sack was published by Plume (US; UK publisher: Turnaround).

Niermann's other titles include: David Lieske: I Tried to Make this Work (Montez Press, 2015); Concentration (ed.) (Fiktion, 2015); and Breites Wissen … nachgelegt. Die seltsame Welt der Drogen und ihrer Nutzer (with Adriano Sack) (Rogner & Bernhard, 2015).

== Solution series ==
Since 2008, Niermann functions as series editor of Solutions (original publications in English), published by Sternberg press and designed by Zak Kyes.

In the series, Niermann together with Jens Thiel published Solution 9: The Great Pyramid, with contributions by Rem Koolhaas, Ai Weiwei, Christian Kracht, David Woodard, and others. Niermann's own titles in the series include the books Solution 1–10: Umbauland (2009), Solution 186–195: Dubai Democracy (2010), Solution 264–274: Drill Nation (2015), the novel Solution 257: Complete Love (2016), Solution 275–294: Communists Anonymous (2017) and Solution 295–304: Mare Amoris (2019).

The ninth volume in the Solution series appeared in 2013: Solution 247–261: Love (edited by Ingo Niermann, with contributions by Douglas Coupland, Eva Illouz, Ben Marcus, Beatriz Preciado, Etel Adnan, Momus, David Pearce, and others).

== Other artistic and editorial activities ==
In 2004, Niermann together with artist Antje Majewski curated the exhibition Atomkrieg ["Nuclear War"] at the Kunsthaus Dresden.

2007 saw the Great Pyramid Monument project as outlined in Umbauland (see above) gain momentum.

In October 2008, Niermann had his first solo exhibition as an artist entitled JOIN THE U.S. ARMY at ZERN Gallery, Berlin.

In 2010, Niermann wrote and co-produced the documentary The Future of Art, followed by the book The Future of Art. A Manual published by Sternberg Press.

Vote: Gwangju folly with Rem Koolhaas (opening Sept. 2013): "Architect Rem Koolhaas and writer Ingo Niermann address public participation. Their folly is positioned in the middle of a busy shopping and entertainment district that is mainly frequented by teenagers. The street has been divided into three pedestrian lanes marked "Yes", "No", and "Maybe". Votes are counted via a digital system and tallies are placed online to create a new form of direct plebiscite."

Niermann is also the co-founder (with Joachim Bessing and Anne Waak) of "waahr.de", a free online archive for literary journalism.

In 2014, Niermann participated in the group exhibition and event series opti-Me* with the artist-run space Auto Italia South East. The project saw Niermann contributing research from Drill Practice, a project initiated at dOCUMTA13.

Niermann is the co-founder of the digital publishing project Fiktion, established by German- and English-language writers in cooperation with Haus der Kulturen der Welt. Fiktion experimentally rejects the economic necessities of the publishing business: all titles are digital and distributed free of charge at www.fiktion.cc.

In 2016, Niermann started an ongoing art-video collaboration with filmmaker Alexa Karolinski. Their film Army of Love premiered at the 9th Berlin Biennale. It has since been included in exhibitions at the Centre Pompidou, MACBA, Castello di Rivoli, as well as CCCB and the Wiesbaden Biennale. Their second installment of the series, OCEANO DE AMOR, was part of a three-month exhibition Auto Italia gallery in London, and it had its world premiere at CPH:DOX in Copenhagen in March 2020. In 2020, Niermann premiered his video "Sea Lovers" at the "Countryside – The Future" exhibition at the Solomon R. Guggenheim Museum.

== Bibliography: original publications ==
- Der Effekt (Roman), Berlin Verlag, Berlin, 2001
- Minusvisionen, Suhrkamp Verlag, Frankfurt/Main, 2003
- Atomkrieg (catalogue; with Antje Majewski), Lukas & Sternberg, Berlin und New York, 2004
- Umbauland, Suhrkamp Verlag, Frankfurt/Main, 2006
- Metan (with Christian Kracht), Rogner & Bernhard, Berlin, 2007
- Breites Wissen. Die seltsame Welt der Drogen und ihrer Nutzer (with Adriano Sack), Eichborn Verlag, Frankfurt/Main, 2007
- China ruft dich, Rogner & Bernhard, Berlin, 2008
- Solution 9. The Great Pyramid (ed. with Jens Thiel), Sternberg Press, 2008
- Solution 1–10: Umbauland [extended and translated], Sternberg Press, 2009
- Deutscher Sohn (with Alexander Wallasch), Blumenbar Verlag, 2010
- Solution 186–195: Dubai Democracy, Sternberg Press, 2010
- The Future of Art: A Manual(with Erik Niedling) Sternberg Press, 2011
- Choose Drill [part of the dOCUMENTA(13) series "100 Notes – 100 Thoughts"], Hatje Cantz, 2011
- The Future of Art: A Diary (with Erik Niedling and Tom McCarthy), Sternberg Press, 2012
- Solution 247–261: Love (ed.), Sternberg Press, 2013
- David Lieske: I Tried To Make This Work Montez Press, 2015
- Concentration (ed.) Fiktion, 2015
- Breites Wissen nachgelegt. Die seltsame Welt der Drogen und ihrer Nutzer (with Adriano Sack) Rogner & Bernhard, 2015
- Solution 264–274: Drill Nation Sternberg Press, 2015
- Solution 257: Complete Love (novel) Sternberg Press, 2016
- Solution 275–294: Communists Anonymous Sternberg Press, 2017
- Burial of the White Man (with Erik Niedling) Sternberg Press, 2019
- Solution 295–304: Mare Amoris Sternberg Press, 2019

and

- Zehntausend Jahre (short story), in Christian Kracht (Hg.), Mesopotamia, DVA, Stuttgart, 1999
- deutschemalereizweitausenddrei, with Nicolaus Schafhausen, Lukas & Sternberg, Berlin, 2003 ISBN 0-9726806-0-8
- On my own, in: The Blind Pavilion by Olafur Eliasson, Hatje Cantz, Ostfildern, 2004, ISBN 3-7757-1377-8
- Die Zukunft der Literatur, in: BELLA triste Nr. 13, Hildesheim 2005.
- Der Geist von Amerika (travelogue, with Christian Kracht), in: Christian Kracht, New Wave, Kiepenheuer & Witsch, Köln, 2007
- Una Piramide per Sempre, in: Abitare, Mailand, 2008
- Erik Niedling / Formation, Hatje Cantz, Ostfildern, 2008.
