= Peter Cook (architect) =

British architect (born 1936)

Sir Peter Cook RA
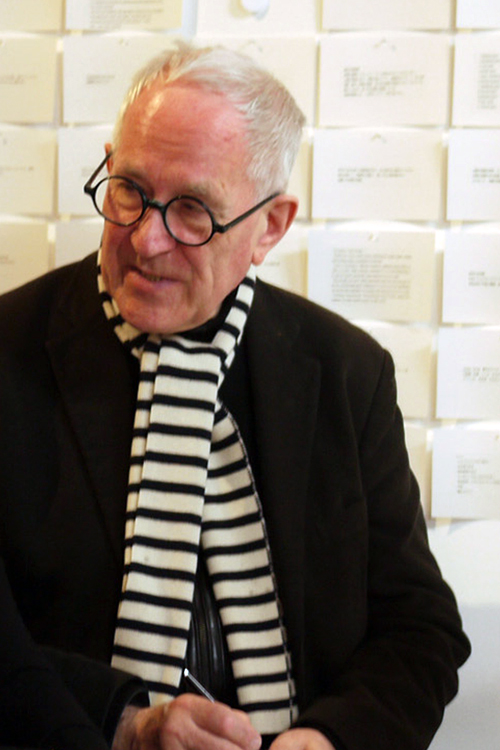
- Cook in 2010
- Born: 22 October 1936 (age 90); Southend-on-Sea, England
- Occupation: Architect
- Spouse: Yael Reisner
- Children: A. G. Cook

Sir Peter Cook RA (born 22 October 1936) is an English architect, lecturer and writer on architectural subjects. He was a founder of Archigram, and was knighted in 2007 by Elizabeth II for his services to architecture and teaching. He is also a Royal Academician and a Commandeur de l'Ordre des Arts et des Lettres of the French Republic. His achievements with Archigram were recognised by the Royal Institute of British Architects in 2004, when the group was awarded the Royal Gold Medal.

== Early life and education ==
Cook was born in Southend-on-Sea, Essex. His mother aspired to a career as an artist, while his father served in the UK as an army officer. Cook studied architecture at Bournemouth College of Art from 1953–58. He then entered the Architectural Association School of Architecture in London, graduating in 1960.

== Career ==
Cook was a director of London's Institute of Contemporary Arts (1970–1972), chair of architecture at The Bartlett School of Architecture at University College London (1990–2006), and has been the director of Art Net in London and curator of the British Pavilion at the Venice Architecture Biennale. He continues to curate, organise and exhibit around the world: in Seoul, LA, Cyprus, the Centre Georges Pompidou, Design Museum, Louisiana Museum of Modern Art, as well as in castles, sheds and garages.

He is a Senior Fellow of the Royal College of Art, London. Cook's professorships include those of the Royal Academy, University College London and the Hochschule für Bildende Künste (Städelschule) in Frankfurt-Main, Germany.

Cook has built in Osaka, Nagoya, Berlin and Madrid. However, it was the construction of his arts building in 2003, the Kunsthaus Graz (also known as 'The Friendly Alien') in Graz, Austria, with Colin Fournier, that brought his work to a wider public.

Cook was awarded a knighthood in Elizabeth II's 2007 Birthday Honours List, for services to architecture.

In 2013, he completed the Vienna University of Economics and Business's new law faculty and Australia's newest school of architecture, the Abedian School of Architecture at Bond University on the Gold Coast.

His first building in the UK, a new drawing studio at the Arts University Bournemouth, was opened by Zaha Hadid in March 2016. He also built the Innovation Studio at the Arts University Bournemouth, which was opened by Odile Decq in 2021.

In 2025, Cook built a Play Pavilion at the Serpentine London in collaboration with LEGO. It opened on World Play Day on the 11th June.

== Awards and honours ==
- 1960 – Henry Florence Student A.A. (Building Centre research Scholar)
- 1961 – Piccadilly Circus competition (Mention)
- 1962 – Gas Council House Design (First Prize)
- 1965 – Selected as one of "Young British Designers" Sunday Times exhibition
- 1996 – Jean Tschumi Medal, International Union of Architects
- 1969 – Grant awarded by Graham Foundation, Chicago, for Instant City
- 2002 – Annie Spink Award, jointly awarded to David Greene (for contribution to architectural education) by the RIBA
- 2002 – Royal Gold Medal (with Archigram) by RIBA
- 2003 – Commandeur de l'Ordre des Arts et des Lettres of the French Republic
- 2004 – Finalist for Stirling Prize for Kunsthaus Graz (with Colin Fournier)
- 2007 – Knighted in Queen's Honours' list (for services in architecture)
- 2008 – Senior Fellow of the Royal College of Art, London
- 2010 – Mario Pani Award for Architecture, Mexico City
- 2010 – Honorary Doctorate of Technology, Lund University, Sweden

== Success in architectural competitions ==
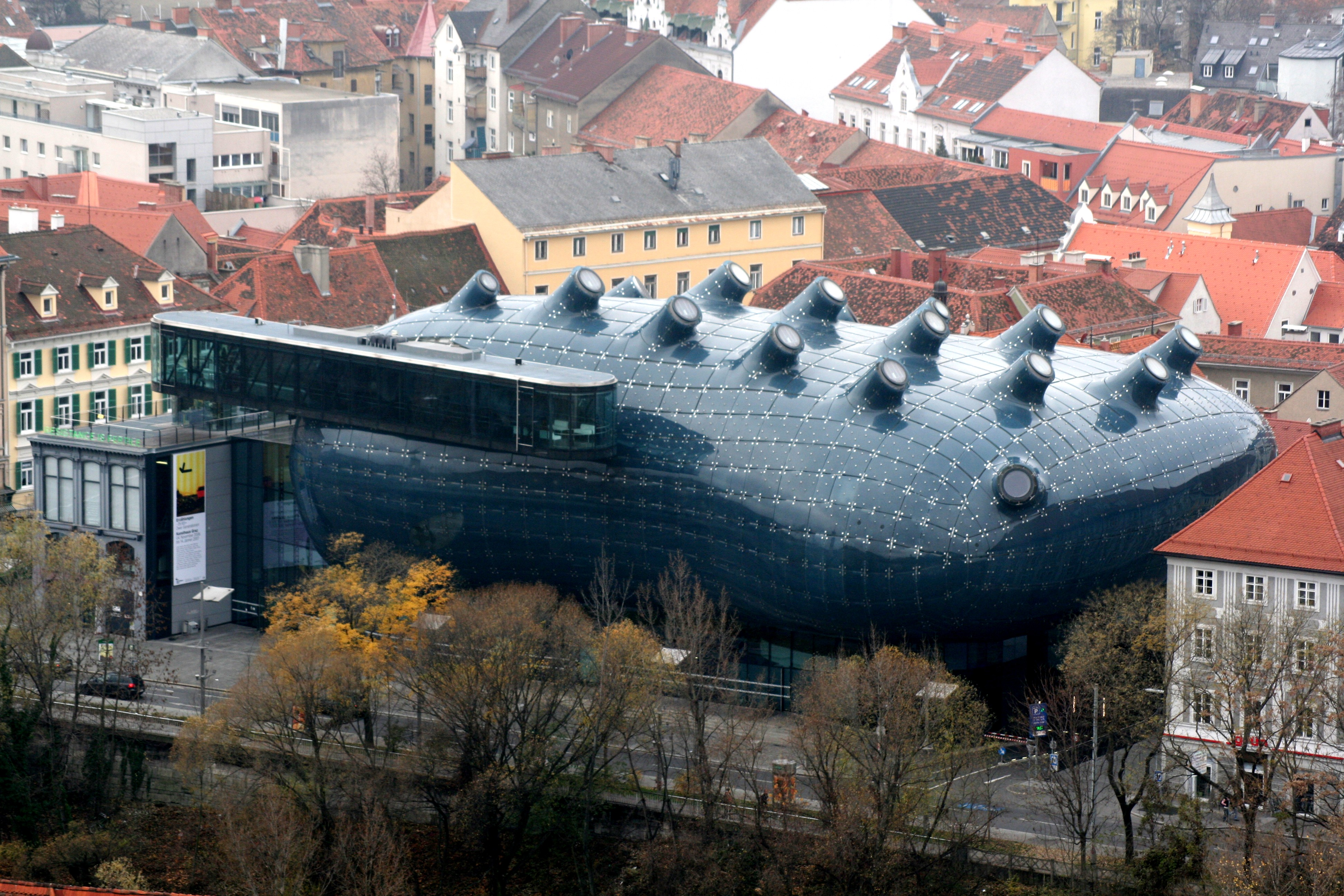
Kunsthaus Graz

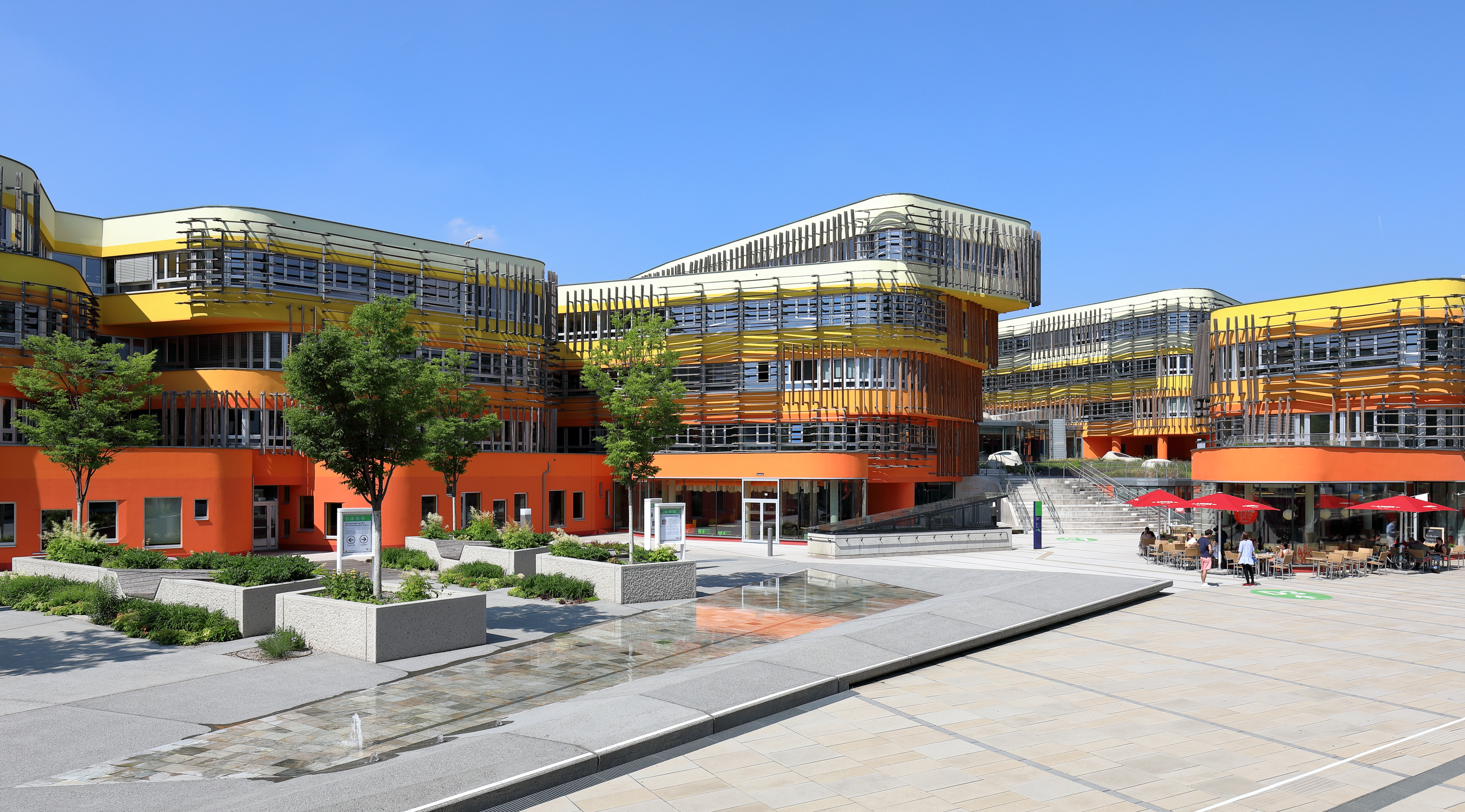
Vienna University of Economics and Business (Department D3 and AD)

- 1970 – Monte Carlo Entertainments Centre (with Archigram)
- 1990 – Solar Housing, Landstuhl, Germany (with Christine Hawley)
- 1992 – Museum of Antiquities, Austria (with Christine Hawley)
- 2000 – Kunsthaus Graz (with Colin Fournier)
- 2006 – New Theatre Verbania, Italy (with Gavin Robotham)
- 2009 – Faculty of Law (D3) and Central Administration (AD), Vienna Business and Economics University (with Gavin Robotham)
- 2010 – 2nd prize in the Taiwan Tower international competition (with Gavin Robotham)
- 2011 – Soheil Abedian School of Architecture, Bond University on the Gold Coast, Australia (with Gavin Robotham and Brit Andresen)
- 2013 – Finalist in the National Stadium of Israel (with POPULOUS)
- 2013 – Finalist in the Gold Coast Cultural Precinct

== Current appointments ==
- Professor Emeritus at University College London
- Professor of Architecture at the Royal Academy of Arts
- Life Professor at the Hochschule für Bildende Kunste (Städelschule) Frankfurt-Main
- Senior Fellow of the Royal College of Art, London
- Honorary Fellow of the Arts University Bournemouth
- Member of the Hessische Architektenkammer
- Member of the RIBA, Architects Registration Board (ARB)
- Fellow of University College London

== Exhibitions ==
- Archigram exhibition – 1994 onwards: Vienna, Paris, New York, London, Pasadena, Chicago, Milan, Hamburg, Seoul, Mito, Taipei, Winnipeg, Zurich, Cracow, Zaragoza, Brussels, Rotterdam.
- Curator of Venice Biennale of Architecture British Pavilion 2004, Cyprus Pavilion 2006
- Personal exhibitions – various dates: Los Angeles, Tokyo, Oslo, Berlin, Osaka, Frankfurt,

== Publications ==
- 1967 – Architecture: Action and Plan. London: Studio Vista.
- 1970 – Experimental Architecture. London/New York: Studio Vista/Universal Books.
- 1972 – Archigram. London: Studio Vista/Reinhold, Birkhauser
- 1975 – Melting Architecture. London: Peter Cook, (published to accompany Art Net exhibition).
- 1976 – Art Net The Rally: Forty London Architects. London: Art Net/Peter Cook, (published to accompany Art Net exhibition).
- 1976 – Arcadia: The Search for the Perfect Suburb. London: Art Net/Peter Cook.
- 1980 – Six Houses (with Christine Hawley). London: AA Publications, (published to accompany exhibition at the Architectural Association).
- 1983 – Los Angeles Now (with Barbara Goldstein). London: AA Publications, (published to accompany exhibition at the Architectural Association).
- 1985 – Peter Cook – 21 Years, 21 Ideas. Christine Hawley; foreword by Reyner Banham. Architectural Association exhibition catalogue. London: AA Publications.
- 1985 – Lebbeus Woods (editor; with Olive Brown); Architectural Association exhibition catalogue. London: AA Publications, 1985.
- 1987 – Cities (with Christine Hawley); exhibition catalogue. London: Fisher Fine Arts.
- 1989 – Peter Cook 1961–89. A+U.
- 1991 – New Spirit in Architecture (with Rosie Llewellyn-Jones). New York: Rizzoli.
- 1993 – Six Conversations. London: Academy Editions, Architectural Monographs Special Issue, No. 28.
- 1996 – Primer. London: Academy Editions.
- 1999 – Archigram. London/New York: Princeton Architectural Press (with Japanese, German, and Chinese translations)
- 1999 – Zvi Hecker, House of the Book (contributor, with John Hejduk and Helene Binet). London: Black Dog.
- 1999 – The Power of Contemporary Architecture (with Neil Spiller). London: Academy Editions.
- 2000 – Bartlett Book of Ideas. London: Bartlett School of Architecture.
- 2001 – The Paradox of Contemporary Architecture (contributor). Chichester: Wiley-Academy.
- 2003 – The City, Seen As A Garden Of Ideas. New York: Monacelli.
- 2008 – Drawing: The Motive Force of Architecture. Chichester: Wiley. 2nd edition published 2014.
- 2016 – Architecture Workbook: Design through Motive. Chichester: Wiley.
- 2021 – Lives in Architecture: Peter Cook. London: RIBA Publishing.
- 2026 – Art of Architecture (with Hans Ulrich Obrist). London: HENI Publishing.
