= Great Pyramid Monument =

Proposed mausoleum in Germany

Great Pyramid Monument (Model)

General information
- Type: Monument

The Great Pyramid Monument is a German proposal for a mausoleum, patterned after the Great Pyramid of Giza in Egypt.

== Beginnings ==
The concept of constructing a modern pyramid was originally proposed by German writer Ingo Niermann. He suggested a memorial be erected in the former East Germany, to serve as a democratic tomb for people from any ethnic, ethical and religious group. If developed correctly it could also become a tourist attraction, and a beginning point for intercultural dialog.

== Concept ==
The Great Pyramid is envisioned as the world's largest monument, potentially serving every human being as a grave or memorial site.

The group's mission statement explains that the monument is envisioned as being "affordable" as well as "[serving] all nationalities and religions. Individuals who are either unwilling or unable to have their ashes buried there can also opt to have a memorial stone placed instead. Stones can be custom designed with any number of colors, images, or relief decorations. The Great Pyramid will continue to grow with every stone placed, eventually forming the largest structure in the history of man."

Choosing (and re-visiting) the ancient building technique and shape of a pyramid is integral to the project, as it allows for continuous growth (see Fig.1) of the monument site.

== Background ==
The Great Pyramid Monument is based on the idea of German writer and journalist Ingo Niermann, which he first proposed in 2006 in a collection of essays on possible measures to restructure German society and to solve some of the pertinent problems of 21st century Germany (Umbauland, – translates to refurbish-country or change-country). Together with economist Jens Thiel, engineer Heiko Holzberger and a few others, he founded the group "Friends of the Great Pyramid". They raised initial funding of some 100.000 € from a German federal foundation Kulturstiftung des Bundes in their program for the Future of Labor. This enabled the group to pursue the project of the Great pyramid in terms of public relations, to develop a solid business plan, and to scout for feasible building sites, especially in Eastern Germany. The endeavour is portrayed in a feature-length documentary film by German director Frauke Finsterwalder.

== Reactions to the Concept of the 'Great Pyramid Monument' ==
=== Regional (Dessau, Eastern Germany) ===
In spring 2007, a thorough analysis of the infrastructure in Eastern Germany narrowed the most feasible site for the great pyramid to a region outside Dessau, 100 km south of Berlin. The two villages of Streetz and Natho, however, showed limited enthusiasm for the project. Nevertheless, an interesting dialogue had begun, and September 2007 saw a symbolic founding stone being laid in Streetz, Dessau-Rosslau, Germany. A festival which showcased international and local artists accompanied this event and received considerable national and international media coverage.

=== International ===
Since the website launch in early spring 2007, the idea of the great pyramid monument has fueled interest in several countries. Almost 1500 entities currently express their support for the idea of such an alternative forthcoming necropolis by holding a non-binding reservation for a resting stone in the pyramid via the group's website.

The relaunch issue of the Italian design magazine Abitare (October 2007) featured Niermann's concept in his own words. Scottish singer and cultural critic Nick Currie aka Momus likes the idea, while remaining wary of an implied or a perceived fascist aesthetic.

==== Architectural competition ====
As of November 2007, a closed-call competition to develop a sound architectural concept in designing the pyramid building and its surroundings is in progress. Participating architects include Ai Weiwei, Beijing, Arquitectonica, Miami and New York, Atelier Bow-Wow, Tokyo, Nikolaus Hirsch, Wolfgang Lorch and Markus Miessen, Frankfurt/M. and London, and MADA s.p.a.m., Shanghai and Los Angeles.

The pyramid monument group have also gathered an internationally renowned jury board, comprising Omar Akbar, Architect and Executive Director of the Bauhaus Dessau Foundation, Stefano Boeri, Architect and Editor of the magazine Abitare, Milan, Rem Koolhaas (President of the Jury), Architect, Rotterdam, for the group themselves Ingo Niermann, writer and journalist, as well as Miuccia Prada, designer and entrepreneur from Milan.
