= Erik Niedling =

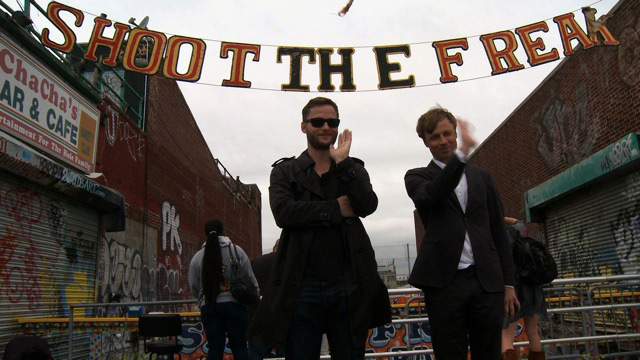
- Niedling and Niermann in their 2010 documentary The Future of Art
- Born: 18 October 1973 (age 52); Erfurt, East Germany
- Known for: Photography
- Notable work: Redox (2010), The Future of Art (2010), Chamber (2012)
- Website: www.erikniedling.com

Erik Niedling (born 1973 in Erfurt, Thuringia) is a German artist. He is also known for his 2010 film The Future of Art, a documentary on the contemporary art scene.

== Life and works ==
Niedling was raised in Erfurt and lives in Berlin. His works revolve around the construction of history, the traces that history left in the collective mind. Later works are also marked with questions on collecting, archiving and organising, whereby the preservation and (fictitious) disappearance of one's own identity comes to the fore.

Since the mid-2000s, Niedling has established himself as a conceptual artist. Along with Ingo Niermann he directed and produced the documentary The Future of Art. It consist of interviews with contemporary artists, critics, and collectors such as Olafur Eliasson, Harald Falckenberg, Damien Hirst, Hans-Ulrich Obrist, Marina Abramović, Olaf Breuning, Terence Koh, Genesis P-Orridge, Boris Groys, and Tobias Rehberger. In the course of the film, Niermann develops the idea of a pyramid mountain as a work of art, which is also the individual burial place of a collector. At the end of the shooting, Niermann transferred the idea to Erik Niedling, who has since continued it in sometimes radical art projects. In particular, "Mein letztes Jahr" (My last year), in which Niedling, implementing a drill by Ingo Niermann, consistently lived for one year in the period from 1 March 2011 to 29 February 2012, as if it were his last. This was followed by exhibitions, publications and artistic actions dealing with the realisation of the pyramid mountain and research into radical political movements. On 8 May 2017, Niedling performed a ritual possession (Seizure) of the mountain Kleiner Gleichberg in the district of Hildburghausen (Thuringia) for the first time, where since then the "Burial of the White Man" has been held on the mountain every 8 May. A critical reflection of his activities took place through publications ("The Future of Art: A Diary", 2012), interviews and most recently with the novel "Burial of the White Man" (Sternberg Press 2019).

== Selected exhibitions ==
- 2005; Archiv, Goethe-Institut, Bratislava
- 2006; Was ist deutsch? (group exhibition), Germanisches Nationalmuseum, Nuremberg
- 2008; Formation, Hamish Morrison Galerie, Berlin
- 2010; Status, Angermuseum, Erfurt
- 2010; Redox, Hamish Morrison Galerie, Berlin
- 2011; "Mein letztes Jahr", Tobias Naehring, Leipzig
- 2012; 18.10.1973—29.02.2012, Neues Museum Weimar, Weimar
- 2018; "The Future of Art: A Camp" – Haus am Lützowplatz, Berlin
- 2021; "2048 (Cat, Man, Rider, Triangle)" – Galerie Tobias Naehring, Berlin
- 2022; "Dokumentationszentrum Thüringen" – EXILE, Wien

== Publications ==
- Wolfram Morath-Vogel, ed. (2006). "Fotografien = Photographs / Erik Niedling." Cologne: Schaden.com.
- Österreichisches Institut für Photographie und Medienkunst, ed. (2007). "Status / Erik Niedling." Vienna: ÖIP.
- ZERN, ed. (2008). "Formation / Erik Niedling." Contributions by Bernd Stiegler and Ingo Niermann. Ostfildern: Hatje Cantz.
- Erik Niedling with Ingo Niermann (2012). "The Future of Art: A Diary." With texts by Tom McCarthy, Erik Niedling, Ingo Niermann, and Amy Patton. Berlin: Sternberg Press.
- Erik Niedling with Ingo Niermann (2019). "Burial of the White Man". With contributions by Ann Cotten and Jakob Nolte. Berlin: Sternberg Press.
