= The Future of Art =

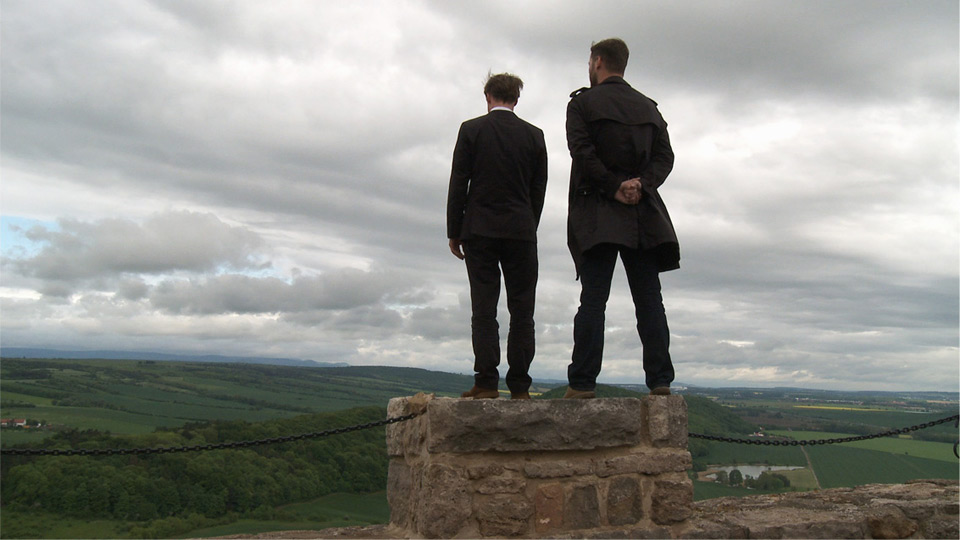
- Niermann and Niedling on the battlements of Castle Wachsenburg in Thuringia
- Directed by: Erik Niedling; Ingo Niermann
- Written by: Ingo Niermann
- Produced by: Erik Niedling; Ingo Niermann
- Cinematography: Christian Görmer
- Edited by: David Adlhoch
- Music by: Katrin Vellrath
- Release date: 10 November 2010
- Running time: 150 minutes
- Country: Germany
- Languages: English; German

The Future of Art is a 2010 documentary film by Erik Niedling and Ingo Niermann. It features interviews with protagonists of the contemporary art scene and premiered on 10 November 2010 in Berlin. The film was released on DVD in September 2011 accompanied by the book The Future of Art. A Manual, published by Sternberg Press.

Subsequent to the premiere screening, the movie was playing at the Angermuseum in Erfurt from 10 to 28 November 2010. Until May 2011 the interviews were also shown as a web series at 3min.de, a video-sharing site of Deutsche Telekom.

The movie was mainly shot in Berlin, Hamburg, Frankfurt and New York.

== Structure ==
The documentary starts with a short prologue (Niermann taking a bath in the Schlachtensee lake in Berlin), followed by the actual interviews which are divided into four main chapters:

I. Investigation
II. Creation
III. Incubation
IV. Presentation

In the interview series, the focus is on how the art business works and how an artist can be successful and create a lasting work of art. In the course of the film, Niermann develops the idea for an epochal work of art in an exemplary manner. Niermann then develops the concept of a pyramid.

The pyramid would be peeled out of a mountain or hill several hundred meters high. The work would be financed by a collector who would then be buried inside the pyramid thus created. After the death of the collector, the demolished material must be piled up again. The pyramid is to disappear.

The film ends at the Wachsenburg in Thuringia. Niedling and Niermann present their idea to the lord of the castle. They ask how much a collector would have to pay to have the castle temporarily pulled down and then the pyramid peeled out of the mountain as planned.

Featured artists, curators, collectors, and critics include (in order of appearance):

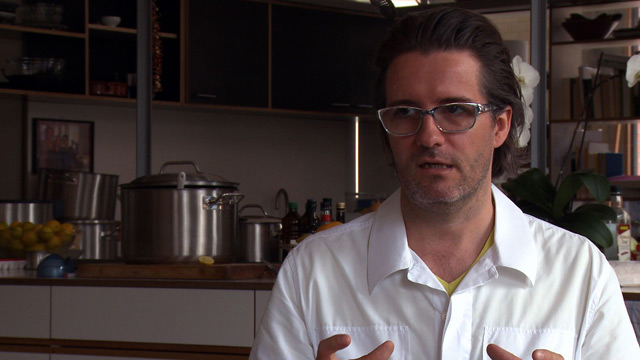
Olafur Eliasson

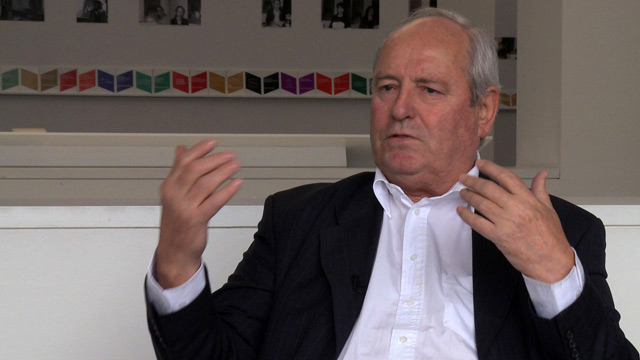
Harald Falckenberg

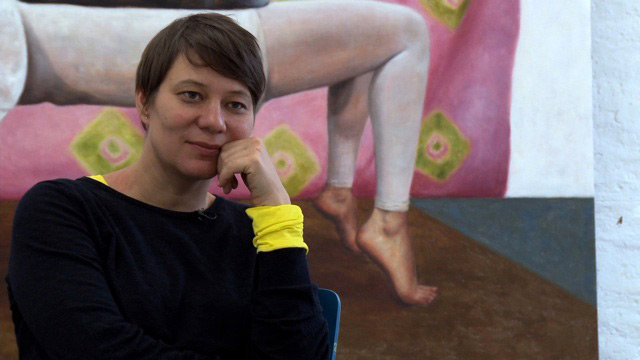
Antje Majewski

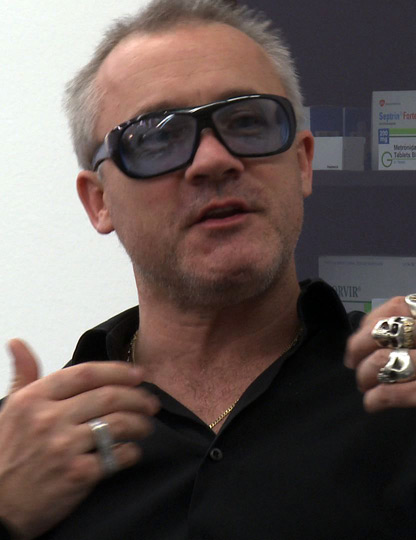
Damien Hirst

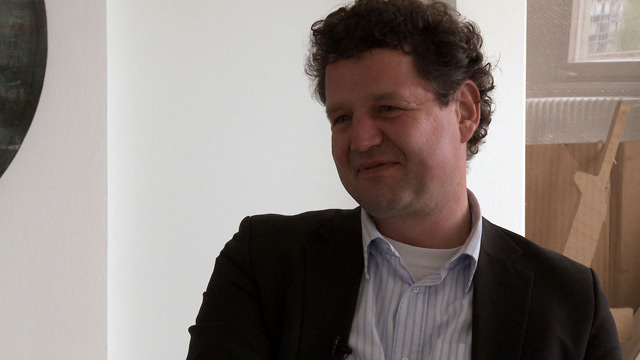
Gregor Jansen

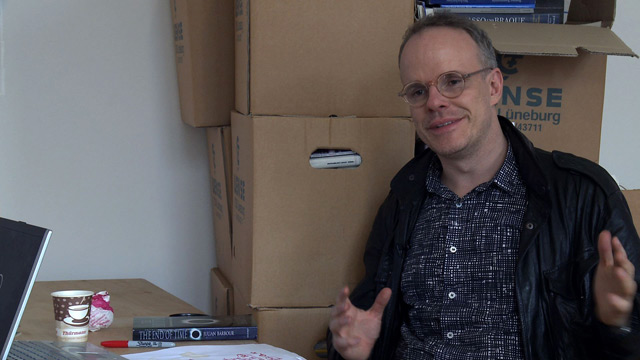
Hans-Ulrich Obrist

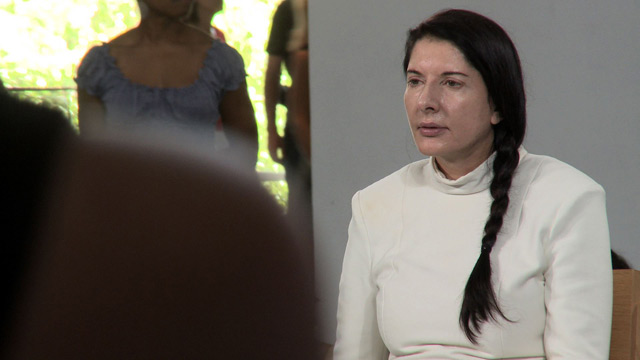
Marina Abramović

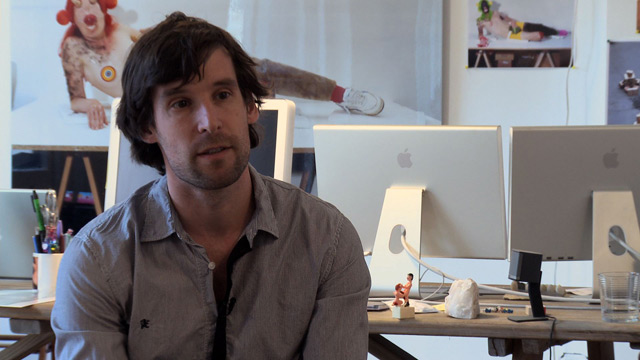
Olaf Breuning

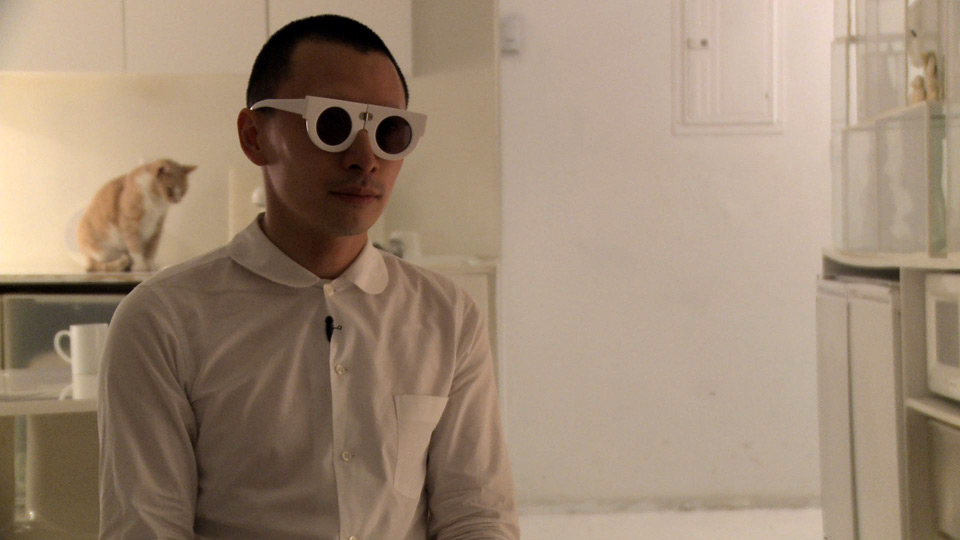
Terence Koh

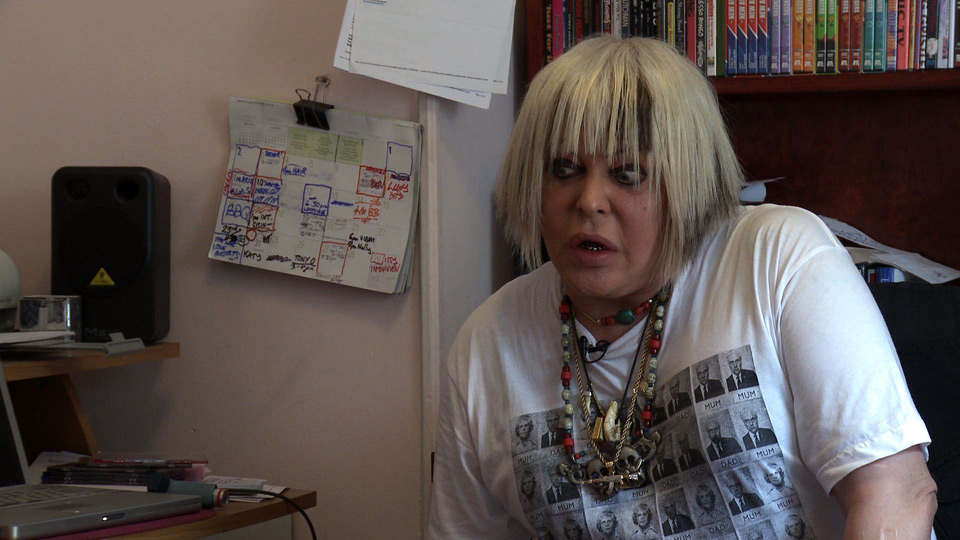
Genesis Breyer P-Orridge

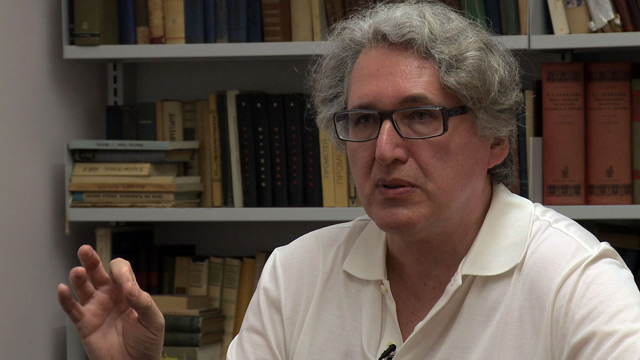
Boris Groys

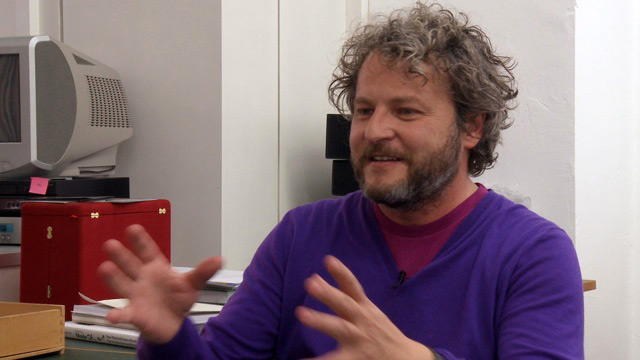
Tobias Rehberger

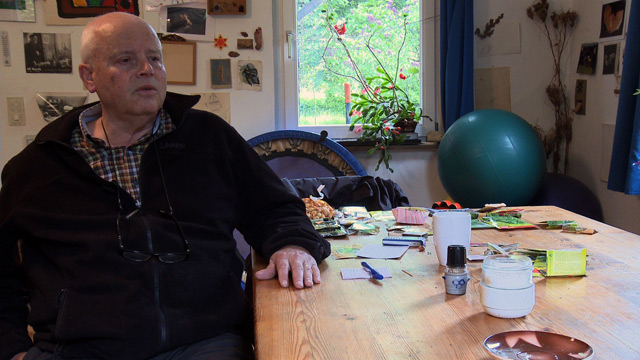
Thomas Bayrle
