= Eisernes Haus, Graz =

Eisernes Haus
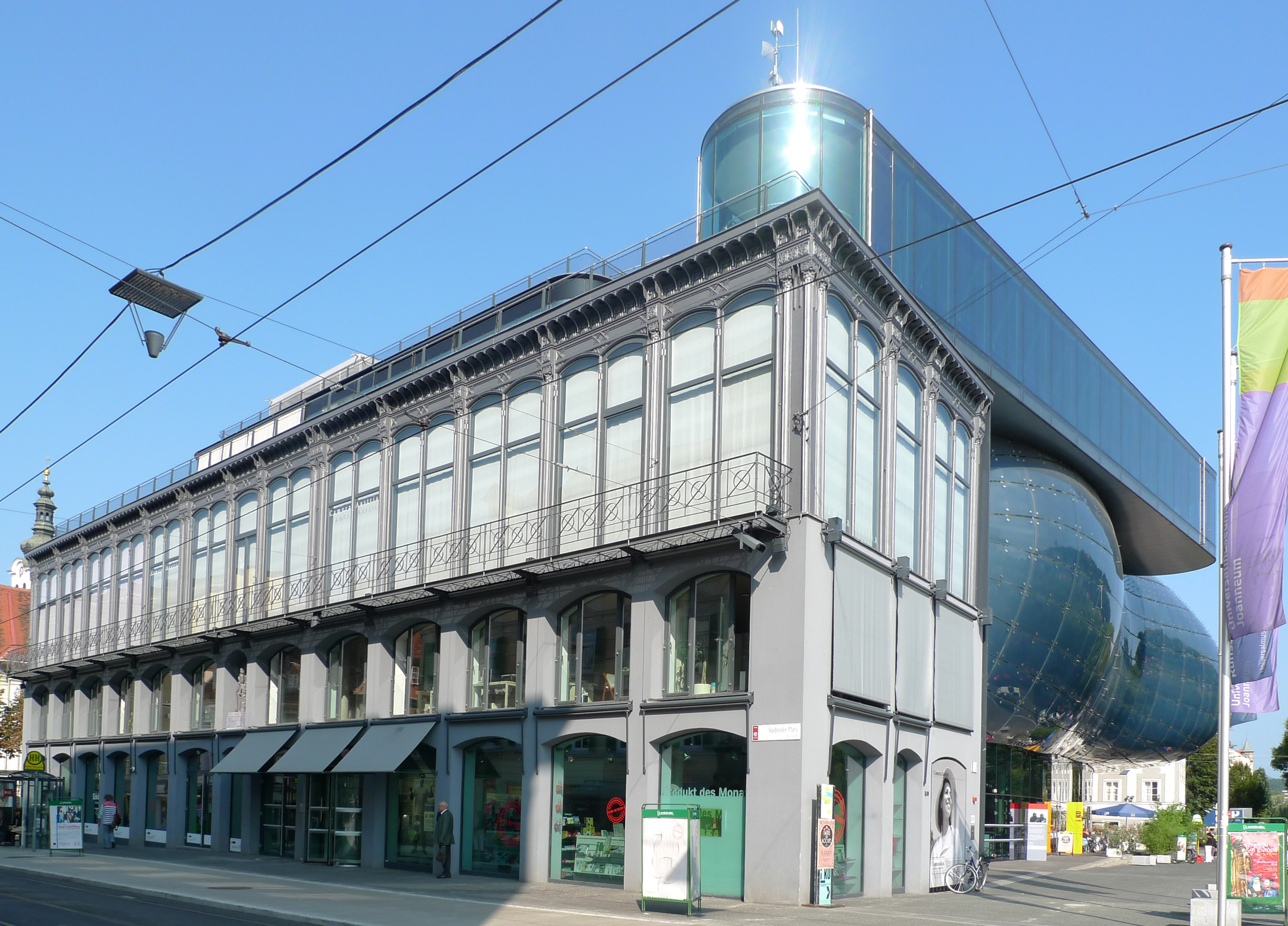
- The building linked to the Kunsthaus
- Interactive map of the Eisernes Haus area

General information
- Location: Graz, Austria
- Coordinates: 47°04′15.96″N 15°26′03.12″E
- Completed: 1848
- Renovated: 2003

The Eiserne Haus (Iron House) is a building in the Lend district of Graz, Austria. It was built in 1848, and is unusual in having a cast iron frame. It is now part of Kunsthaus Graz, a cultural centre.

== History ==
=== Background ===
The bridge over the river Mur at Murplatz (present-day Südtirolerplatz) was for centuries the only crossing point in the city. In 1827 the bridge here, a covered wooden bridge lined on both sides with small wooden shops, was destroyed by flooding. Buildings near the bridge, damaged by the flood, were subsequently demolished.

=== Construction ===
Josef Benedict Withalm, a master builder and manufacturer in Graz, was interested in new construction methods, and recognised the importance of the location of the site on Murplatz, near the main bridge in Graz leading to the city centre. His new structure for the site had a brick-built ground floor and a cast iron frame for the upper floor (modified from his original design to have an iron frame for both floors), with a smaller floor above and a flat roof. The building was completed in 1848; it was one of the first iron-framed buildings in continental Europe.

=== Later history ===
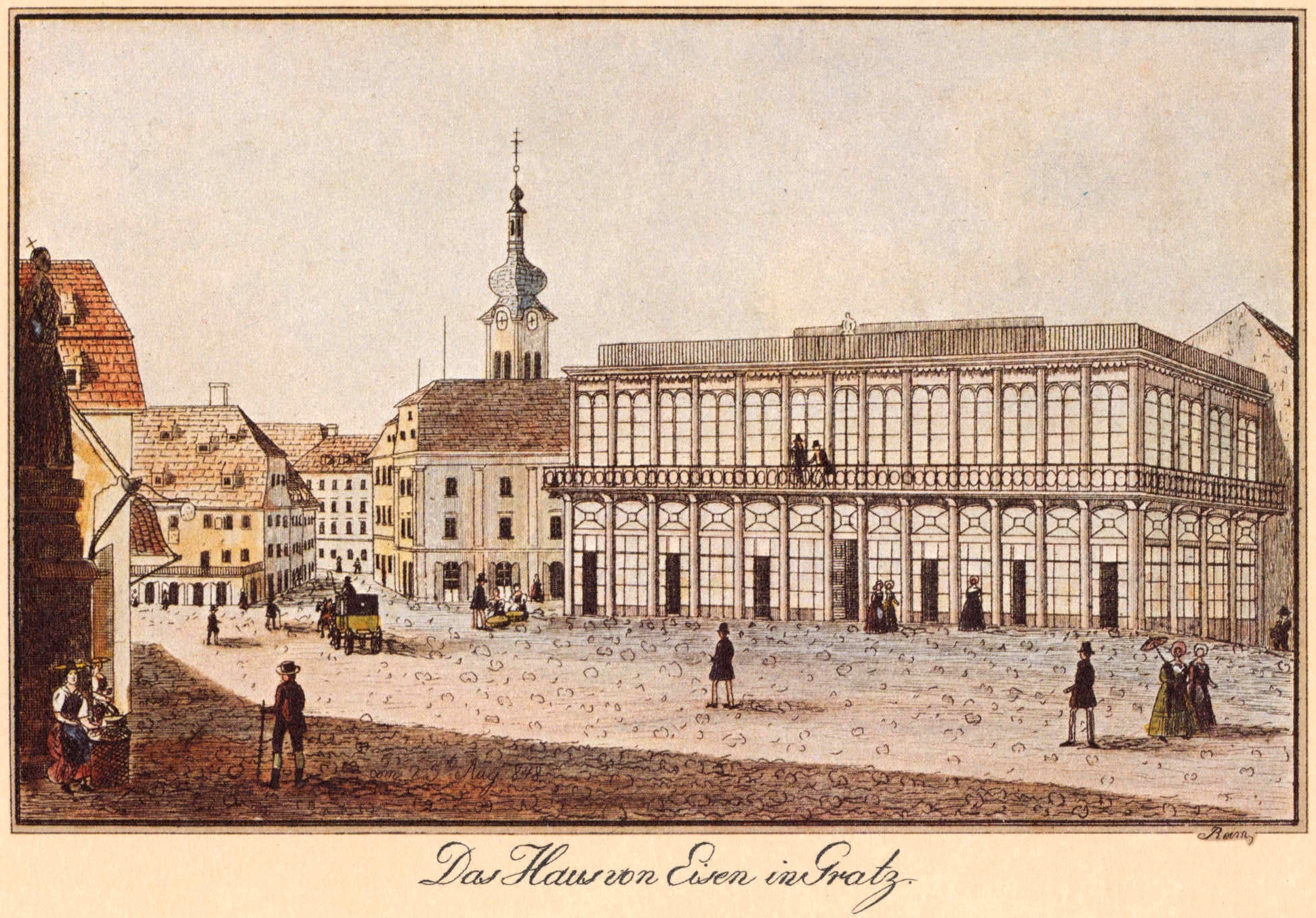
Illustration by Johann Vinzenz Reim of the original design with an iron frame for both storeys

Eisernes Haus was owned and managed by Withalm. There was a department store on the ground floor, a café above (the Café Meran) and a bar in the basement.

After two years the roof was leaking, and an extended top storey was built, with a conventional roof. Withalm sold the property in 1852. Over the following years there were several structural changes, and changes of use.

In 2003 the building, which has protected status, was restored to its original state, and was linked to Kunsthaus Graz, a cultural centre. The former Café Meran became an exhibition space. From 2018, the ground floor has been the location of the Kunsthauscafé.
