= Kunsthaus Graz =

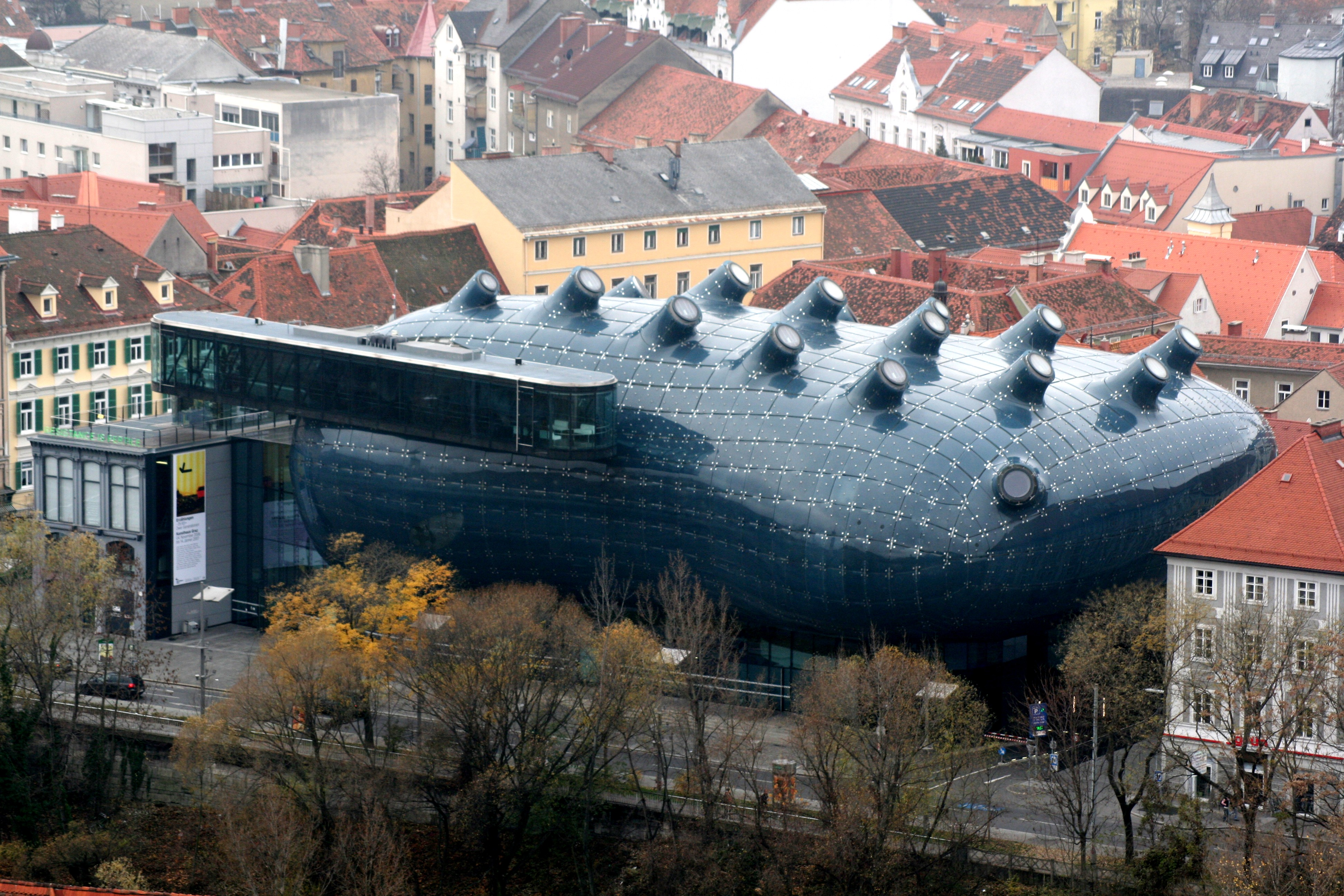
- View of the Kunsthaus Graz from the Castle Hill (Schlossberg)

General information
- Architectural style: Blob architecture
- Location: Graz, Austria
- Coordinates: 47.0714°N 15.4341°E
- Inaugurated: 2003

Design and construction
- Architects: Colin Fournier and Peter Cook

Website
- museum-joanneum.at/en/kunsthaus-graz

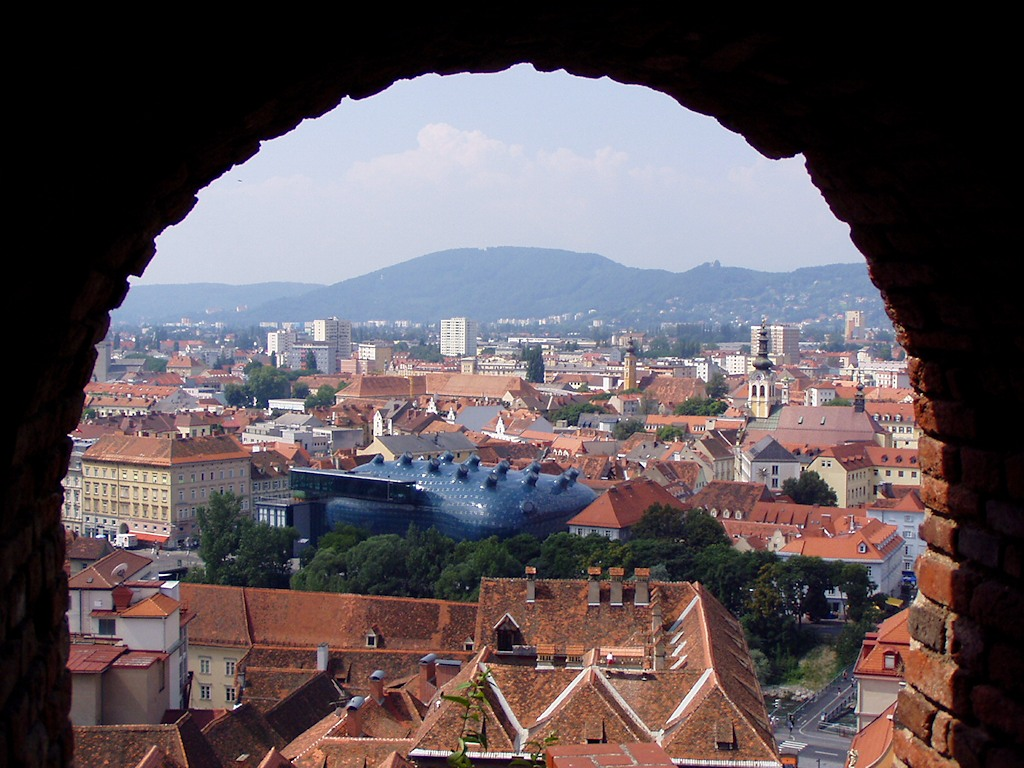
City view from the Castle Hill (Schlossberg) with Kunsthaus in the centre

The Kunsthaus Graz, Grazer Kunsthaus, or Graz Art Museum was built as part of the European Capital of Culture celebrations in 2003 and has since become an architectural landmark in Graz, Austria. Its exhibition program specializes in contemporary art from the 1960s onwards. The museum does not translate its name to English but uses its German name in all its English communications.

== Architecture ==
Kunsthaus Graz was designed by Colin Fournier and Sir Peter Cook. According to The Bartlett School of Architecture at University College London, the Kunsthaus's design sought to be a deliberately provocative, innovate museum design by offering a less "institutional" approach to organising exhibition spaces and employs new materials and manufacturing techniques. The building is an example of blob architecture and has a skin made from iridescent blue acrylic panels, which also double as photovoltaic panels. Owing to its shape and its contrast to its surroundings, it is known as the "Friendly Alien".

The building incorporates the façade of the Iron House, an iron-framed structure built in 1848.

== Concept ==
Architecture, design, new media, internet art, film, and photography are united under one roof. Kunsthaus Graz was developed as an institution to stage international exhibitions of multidisciplinary, modern and contemporary art from the 1960s to the present day. It does not collect art, maintains no permanent exhibitions and does not have its own depot. Rather, its exclusive purpose is to present and procure contemporary art productions.

As founding director, Peter Pakesch was responsible for the Kunsthaus's orientation and programme between the administration in 2003 and the end of his directorship at the Universalmuseum Joanneum.

== Big pixel façade ==
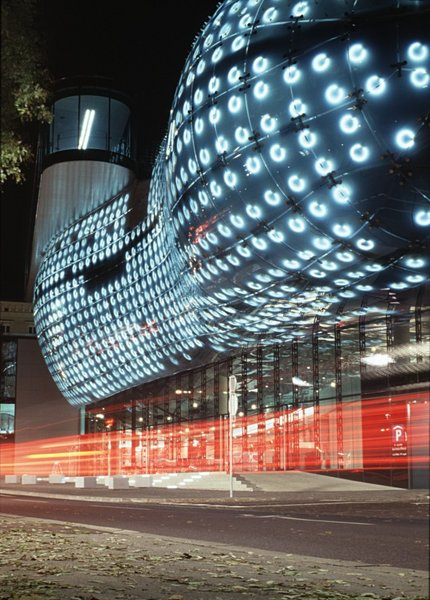
The Kunsthaus Graz at night showing the big pixel media façade

The big pixel (BIX) façade of the museum is based on a concept of the Berlin architects realities:united. The BIX was created inside the acrylic glass skin of the eastern side of the building and it consists of 930 fluorescent lamps, whose brightness can be adjusted individually. The façade can be used as a large screen for films and animations in what is referred to as a "communicative display skin".

The BIX façade concept was entered into the permanent Architecture and Design Collection of the Museum of Modern Art (MoMA) in New York in 2011.

== Other ==
On 1 May 2011, the Austrian Postal Service released a stamp commemorating the object as part of the Kunsthäuser permanent stamp series.

To mark the tenth anniversary of the Kunsthaus, Ingo J. Biermann, Fiene Scharp and Kai Miedendorp made a short half-documentary film in and about the building. The film Astronaut's Ark was conceived for the Kultur:Stadt exhibition, which took place from March to June 2013 at the Akademie der Künste (Berlin) and from July to October 2013 at the Kunsthaus Graz.

== Literature ==
- Cook, Peter & Fournier, Colin. A Friendly Alien: Ein Kunsthaus fur Graz. Hatje Cantz Publishers. September 30, 2004. ISBN 3-7757-1350-6
