= Colin Fournier =

British architect (1944–2024)

- Born: November 1944
- Died: 4 September 2024 (aged 79); Paris, France
- Education: Architectural Association School of Architecture
- Occupation: Architect
- Employer(s): The Bartlett School of Architecture, Confluence Institute for Innovation and Creative Strategies in Architecture, Chinese University of Hong Kong
- Known for: Kunsthaus Graz, member of Archigram
- Title: Professor

Colin Fournier (November 1944 – 4 September 2024) was a British architect. He worked as co-architect with Peter Cook of the Kunsthaus Graz in Austria. Educated at the Architectural Association, Fournier was a founding member of Archigram.

== Life and career ==
Fournier was born in November 1944. He was also professor at Confluence Institute for Innovation and Creative Strategies in Architecture, and The Bartlett School of Architecture, a part of University College London.

He was a faculty member at the School of Architecture, Chinese University of Hong Kong. He was an invited Visiting Professor at National University of Singapore in 2018.

Fournier died in Paris on 4 September 2024, at the age of 79.
