= 2014 in architecture =

The year 2014 in architecture involved some significant architectural events and new buildings.

== Events ==
- June 8–November 23 – Venice Biennale of Architecture curated by Rem Koolhaas
- October 1–3 – The seventh World Architecture Festival in Singapore
- November 4 – Construction of Santiago Calatrava's Chicago Spire is abandoned

== Buildings and structures ==
=== Antarctica ===
- February 12 – Jang Bogo Station opens.

=== Australia ===
- date unknown – Infinity Tower, the tallest building in Brisbane, is completed (until 2016).
- November 11 – Dr Chau Chak Wing Building, University of Technology, Sydney, designed by Frank Gehry, is completed.

=== Canada ===
- September 18 – Aga Khan Museum in Toronto, opens.
- September 19 – Canadian Museum for Human Rights in Winnipeg, Manitoba, designed by Antoine Predock, opens.
- December 13 – Halifax Central Library in Halifax, Nova Scotia, designed by Fowler Bauld and schmidt hammer lassen architects, opens.

=== France ===
Louis Vuitton Foundation

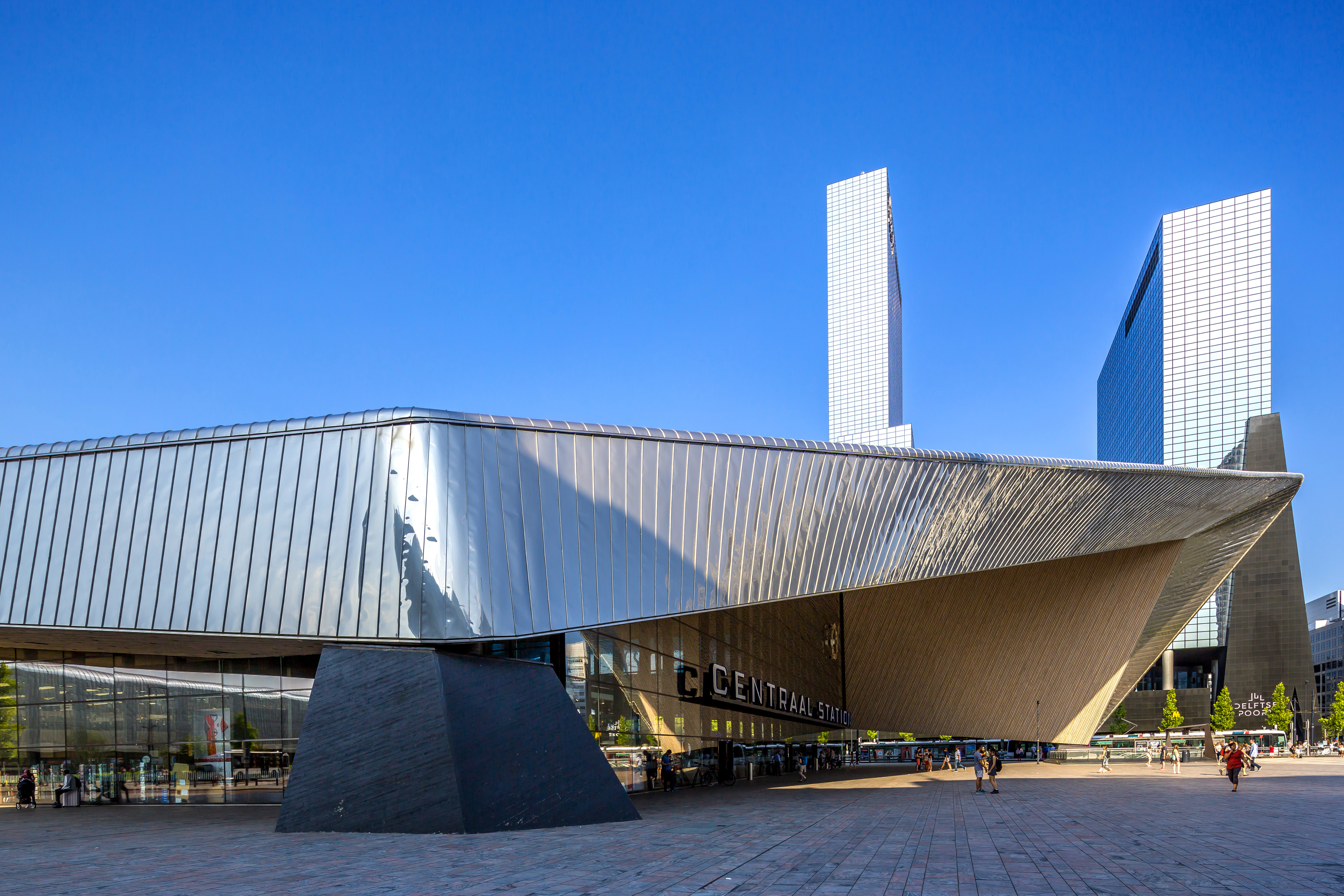
The Rotterdam Central Station

- October 28 – Louis Vuitton Foundation in Paris, designed by Frank Gehry, opens.

=== Germany ===
- February – Taunusturm in Frankfurt opens.

=== Iran ===
- October – Tabiat Bridge in Tehran, designed by Leila Araghian, opens.

=== Italy ===
- October 17 – Bosco Verticale in Milan, by Stefano Boeri opens.

=== Latvia ===
- August 29 – New National Library of Latvia building in Riga, designed by Gunnar Birkerts, opens.

=== Netherlands ===
- March 13 - The new Rotterdam Central Station building, by Benthem Crouwel Architekten opens.

=== Panama ===
- October 2 – Biomuseo in Panama City, designed by Frank Gehry, opens.

=== Philippines ===
- July 21 – Philippine Arena, the world's largest indoor domed-arena, in Ciudad de Victoria, Bocaue and Santa Maria, Bulacan, is completed.

=== Poland ===
- Szczecin Philharmonic Hall, by Barozzi Veiga, is completed.

=== Romania ===
- Summer – The Maryam Mosque, a mosque for Romanian converts to Islam in Rediu, is completed.

=== Taiwan ===
- November 23 – National Taichung Theater, by Toyo Ito with Cecil Balmond, is opened.

=== United Arab Emirates ===
- Marina 101, supertall skyscraper in Dubai, projected for completion. If completed before World One will become the tallest residential building in the world upon completion.

=== United Kingdom ===
- July – Buildings in London designed by Rogers Stirk Harbour + Partners completed:
  - 122 Leadenhall Street in the City.
  - World Conservation and Exhibitions Centre, British Museum.
- August – 20 Fenchurch Street in the City of London, designed by Rafael Viñoly, completed.
- September 16 – The News Building (London), designed by Renzo Piano, officially opened and named.
- September 29 – Weston Library, a major reconstruction of the University of Oxford's New Bodleian Library by WilkinsonEyre, opens to readers.
- December 9 – University of Greenwich Stockwell Street Building, designed by heneghan peng architects (hparc), opened.
- London School of Economics Saw Swee Hock Student Centre, designed by O'Donnell & Tuomey.
- Burntwood School, Wandsworth, London, designed by Allford Hall Monaghan Morris, completed; awarded 2015 Stirling Prize.
- Everyman Theatre, Liverpool, designed by Haworth Tompkins, completed and awarded Stirling Prize.
- Maggie's palliative care centres opened in
  - Lanarkshire, designed by Reiach and Hall (September).
  - Oxford, designed by Wilkinson Eyre Architects (October).

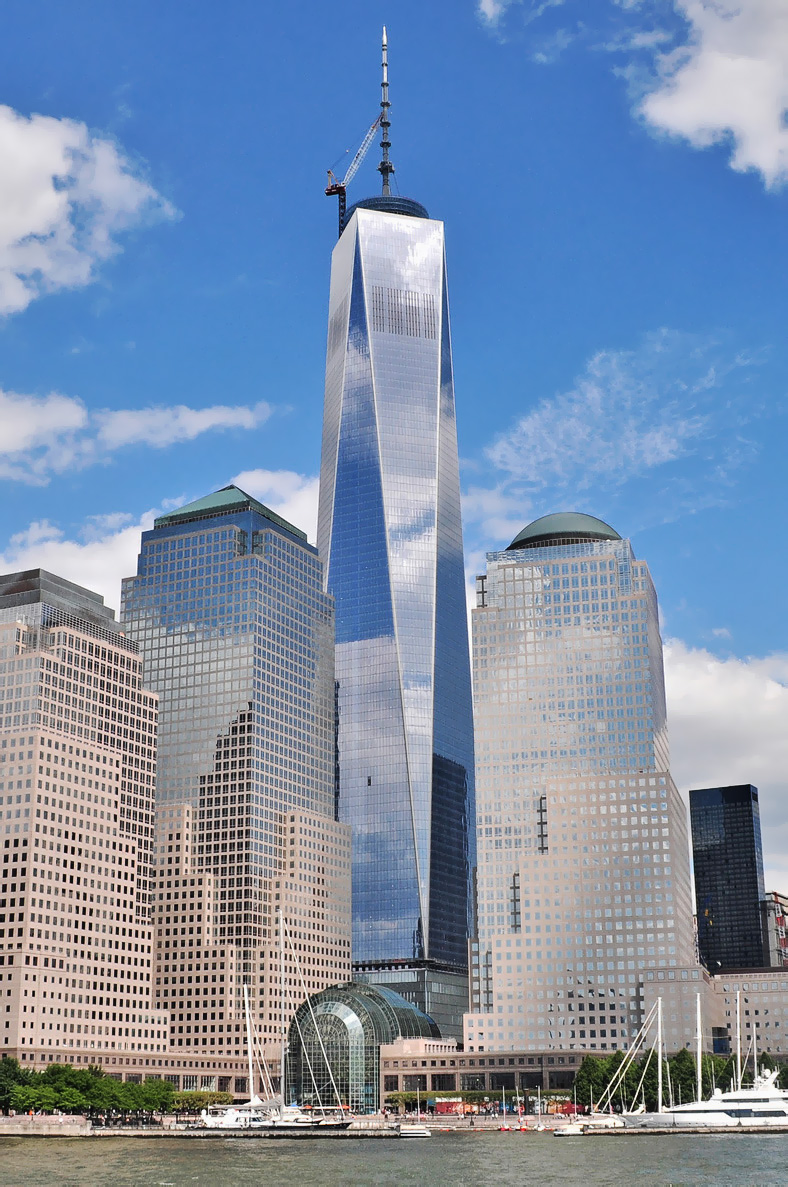
One World Trade Center

=== United States ===
- October 1 — Bill & Melinda Gates Hall at Cornell University is dedicated, designed by Thom Mayne of Morphosis Architects.
- October 9 – Windhover Contemplative Center, designed by Aidlin Darling Design, opens at Stanford University.
- October 10 – 432 Park Avenue, the tallest residential buildings in the world is topped out.
- November 3 – One World Trade Center in New York City, designed by David Childs of Skidmore, Owings & Merrill with Daniel Libeskind, the tallest building in the Western Hemisphere, opens.
- One57, one of the tallest buildings in New York City became the tallest mixed-use (residential and hotel) skyscraper in the city.

== Exhibitions ==
- October 25 until February 22, 2015 - Diller & Scofidio + Renfro Musings on a Glass Box at Fondation Cartier pour l'Art Contemporain in Paris, France.
- December 3 (ends May 2015) – "One Way: Peter Marino" at the Bass Museum in Miami Beach, Florida.

== Awards ==
- AIA Architecture Firm Award – Eskew+Dumez+Ripple
- AIA Gold Medal – Julia Morgan
- Emporis Skyscraper Award – Wangjing SOHO designed by Zaha Hadid
- Driehaus Architecture Prize for New Classical architecture – Pier Carlo Bontempi
- Lawrence Israel Prize – LOT-EK
- LEAF Award, Overall Winner – Ateliers Jean Nouvel and PTW Architects
- Praemium Imperiale Architecture Laureate – Steven Holl
- Pritzker Architecture Prize – Shigeru Ban
- Reed Award for classical architecture commitment – Ruan Yisan
- RAIA Gold Medal – Phil Harris and Adrian Welke
- RIBA Royal Gold Medal – Joseph Rykwert
- Stirling Prize – Haworth Tompkins for Everyman Theatre, Liverpool
- Thomas Jefferson Medal in Architecture – Toyo Ito
- Twenty-five Year Award by AIA – Harry Weese for Washington Metro
- UIA Gold Medal – Ieoh Ming Pei
- Vincent Scully Prize from National Building Museum – Charlie Rose

== Deaths ==
- January 10 – Kathryn Findlay, British-born architect working in Japan (b. 1953)
- February 25 – Heikki Siren, Finnish architect (b. 1918)
- March 20 – William Toomath, (b. 1925), New Zealand architect
- March 28
  - Robin Gibson, Australian architect (b. 1930)
  - Avraham Yaski, Romanian-born Israeli architect and academic (b. 1927)
- April 24 – Hans Hollein, Austrian architect (b. 1934)
- April 28 – Frederic Schwartz, American architect, author and city planner (b. 1951)
- July 11 – Randall Stout, 56, American architect (b. 1958)
- July 26 – Sir Richard MacCormac, British architect (b. 1938)
- August 18 – Kurt Meyer, Swiss-born architect working in the United States and Nepal (b. 1922)
- August 22 – Sir Philip Dowson, British architect (b. 1924)
- September 6 – Édith Girard, French architect (b. 1949)
- September 27
  - Taylor Hardwick, American architect (b. 1925)
  - Antti Lovag, Hungarian architect (Palais Bulles) (b. 1920)
- December 24 – Ricardo Porro, Cuban architect who worked in France (b. 1925)

== See also ==
- Timeline of architecture
