= Odile Decq =

French architect, urban planner, and academic

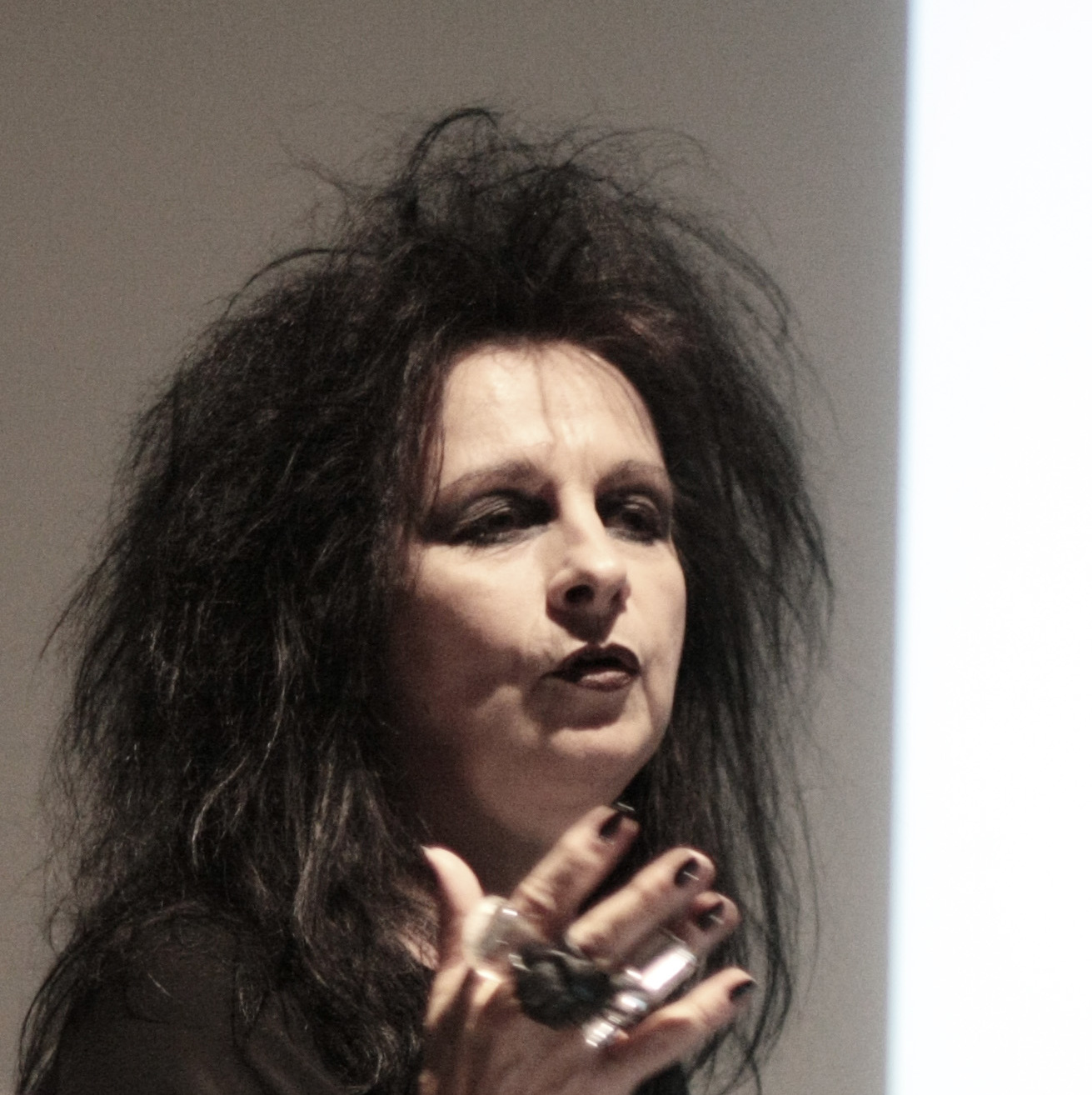
- Decq at GSAPP
- Born: 1955 (age 70–71); Laval, France
- Occupation: Architect
- Practice: Studio Odile Decq
- Website: www.odiledecq.com

Odile Decq (born 1955) is a French architect, urban planner, and academic. She is the founder of the Paris firm, Studio Odile Decq and the architecture school, Confluence Institute. Decq is known for her self-described goth appearance and style.

== Education ==
In the 1970s, Odile Decq first entered École Régionale d'Architecture de Rennes. She was told by the first year director that she would never become an architect because she did not possess the right spirit. She completed two years at Rennes, then moved to Paris, where she enrolled at La Villette (formerly called UP6). Because of the Protests of 1968, Decq spent a lot of time on strike, instead of in class.

In order to finance her education, she began to work for French writer, architect, and urban planner Philippe Boudon. Boudon was writing about the theory of architecture at that time, and was interested in Decq because of her studies in literature and linguistics. Decq began reading for Boudon, and later went on writing for him. After four years, Decq resigned from her job with Boudon to pursue her diploma.

She graduated in 1978 from École nationale supérieure d'architecture de Paris-La Villette with a diploma in urban planning from the Paris Institute of Political Studies in 1979.

== Career ==
Decq opened her own firm in 1979. Her future partner in the firm and in life, Benoît Cornette, was studying medicine at the time. In 1985, Cornette earned a degree in architecture, and the couple established the architecture firm ODBC. The buildings they completed for the Banque Populaire de l’Ouest in Rennes with Peter Rice in 1990 brought them numerous awards and international recognition. It was the first metal-construction office building in France.

Model building is especially important to her process. Decq and Benoît would create models with modular parts that could be moved in order to test the feasibility of various configurations.

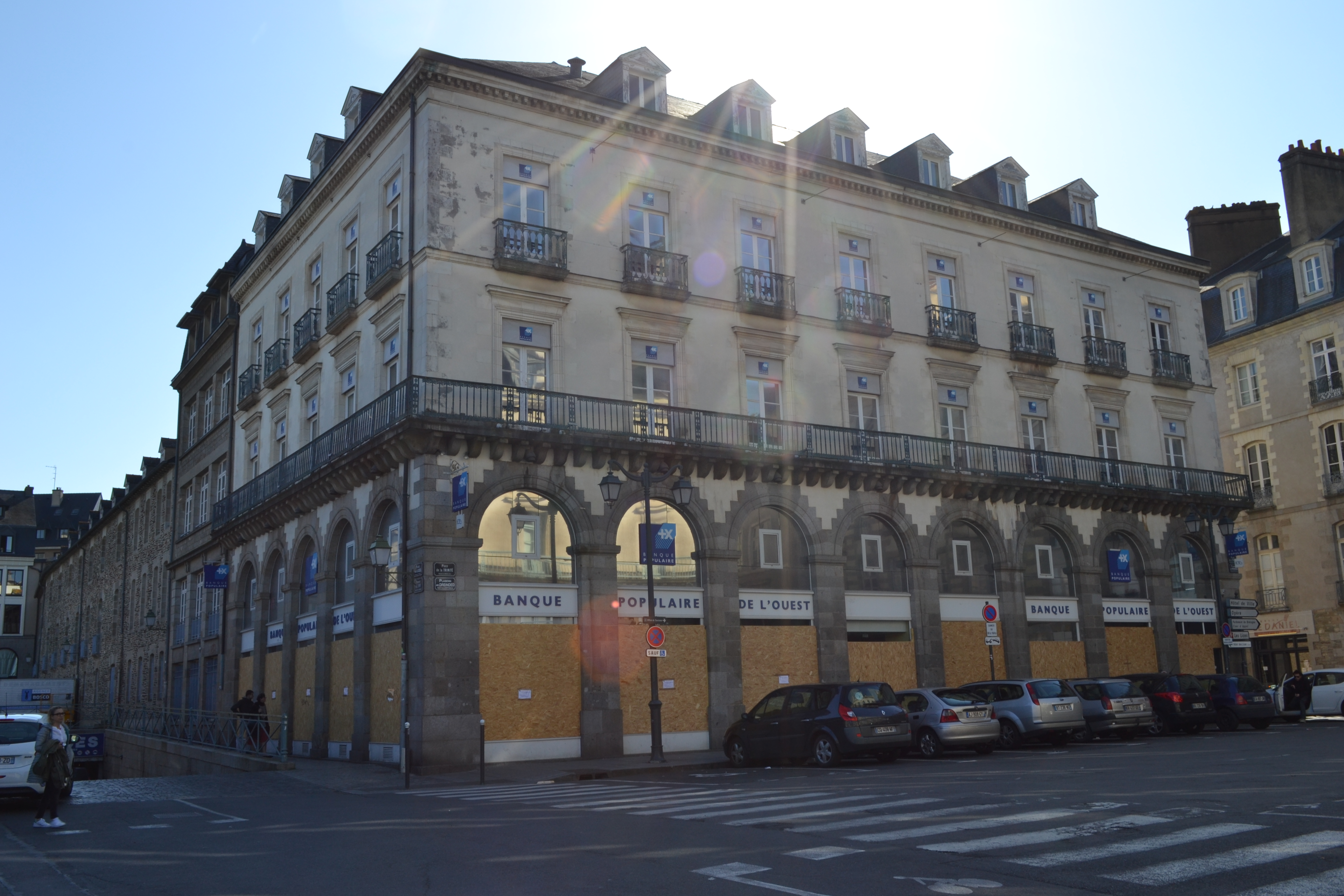
Banque Populaire de l'Ouest à Rennes

In 1998, Cornette died in a car accident at the age of 45. Decq continued to work under the firm ODBC, but in 2013 changed the name to Studio Odile Decq. The name change was prompted by her late husband still being credited with buildings that were solely her design. Despite her husband's death, Decq began experimenting with her designs and ideas even more and trying to find herself again, and soon producing some of her most well-known and successful designs, including the Banque Populaire de l'Ouest à Rennes, the Golden Lion at the Venice Architecture Biennale, and the Macro Museum in Rome. Her projects have grown and continue to grow larger in size, complexity, and daring.

Decq has stated that her philosophy on architecture is that a building " has to be a place where people can move, live in good conditions, forget the hardness of the life outside, so it has to have a kind of humanistic approach..."

She has "been faithful to her fighting attitude while diversifying and radicalizing her research." Being awarded the Golden Lion of Architecture during the Venice Biennale in 1996 acknowledged her early and unusual career. Other than just a style, an attitude, or a process, Odile Decq's work materializes a complete universe that embraces urban planning, architecture, design, and art. Her multidisciplinary approach was recently recognized with the Jane Drew Prize in 2016 and Architizer's Lifetime Achievement Award in 2017.

Since 1992, Odile Decq has been a professor at the École Spéciale d’Architecture in Paris, where she was elected head of the Department of Architecture in 2007. She left in 2012 and subsequently designed and opened her own school, Confluence Institute for Innovation and Creative Strategies in Architecture, https://www.confluence.eu/ in Lyon, France in 2014. She describes her approach to education as forcing students to take a strong position to foster their independence and ability to "express themselves strongly and very clearly." Since 2019, her school is based in Paris and was accredited by the "Royal Institute of British Architects" (RIBA) in 2017.

This school was a place where Decq was able to put her unique design philosophy into an educational context, fostering innovation and creative problem-solving in future architects. This led to significant changes in the way people viewed architectural education. It encouraged young architects to take risks and not adhere to current conditions and ideas.

More than 20 years ago, she entered the field of design by creating a series of furniture, armchairs, and tables for the UNESCO headquarters in Paris with the Editors Domeau & Peres. Since then, each of her projects has been the subject of new creations, such as new lamps developed in the Luceplan catalog.

She has always been passionate about and a collector of contemporary art, and in 2007, she had her first exhibition at the Polaris gallery in Paris. She then seeks to reinvest her own research in architecture in art and gradually moves away from it while sometimes keeping a link. Thus, the portfolios of serigraphs produced for the publisher Bernard Chauveau on the occasion of the realization of the Macro, the Frac Bretagne, or the restaurant Phantom at the Opéra Garnier are graphic deconstructions of the elements of the projects; the same is true of the series of ALOD plates made in 2016.

After creating the Oniris gallery stand for Art Paris in 2010, she exhibited at the Gallery in 2017 and produced photos and mobiles on this occasion. Finally, the Philippe Gravier gallery in Paris offered her to create a set of tables and lamps for Design Miami Art Basel in 2019 and for the FIAC the “Pavillon Noir” built Place de la Concorde in Paris in October of the same year, and the “Green Pavilion” for Paris + Art Basel built in the Tuileries Gardens in 2022.

Recent exhibitions and installations: In 2018, Odile Decq was invited to create two installations, "Pahtom's Phantom" and "Time-Space-Existence," during the 16th Venice Biennale and an ongoing traveling exhibition, "Horizons," at the House of Arts in Ostrava. At the moment, the exhibition is installed in Kosice.

== Notable works ==
- 1990 – Banque populaire de l’Ouest (BPO), administrative and social centers, Rennesrance
- 1996 – Scenography of the French pavilion, Venice Biennale of Architecture
- 1998 – University of Nantes, formation center, library, and science building
- 1999 – Viaduct and Operation Center of the A14 motorway, Nanterre, France
- 2001 – Redevelopment and furniture design of the UNESCO Conference Hall, Paris, France
- 2007 – Greenland Pavilion, Shanghai, China
- 2010 – MACRO, Museum of Contemporary Art of Rome, Italy (extension-renovation)
- 2011 – PHANTOM, L'Opéra Restaurant of the Opéra Garnier in Paris, France
- 2012 – FRAC Bretagne, Regional Contemporary Art Fund, Rennes, France
- 2014 – GL Events Headquarters in Lyon, France
- 2015 – Pentania, a mix of residential buildings and individual houses, Lille, France
- 2015 – Fangshan Tangshan National Geopark Museum, Museum of Geology and Anthropology, Nanjing, China
- 2015 – Maison Bernard, Antti Lovag's Bubble Palace, Théoule-sur-Mer, France (renovation)
- 2015 – Confluence Institute for Innovation and Creative Strategies in Architecture, a school in Lyon, France (renovation-rehabilitation)
- 2015 – Saint-Ange, artist's residency, Seyssins, France
- 2016 – Le CARGO, offices and startup incubator, Paris, France
- 2018 - Twist, office building, Paris, France
- 2020 - Antares building, Barcelona, Spain

== Awards and honors ==
- 1986 – Albums of young architects, with Benoît Cornette
- 1990 – Nominated for Prix de l’Équerre d’Argent
- 1990 – Architecture and Working Space Award - AMO
- 1990 – Premier Award, Ninth International Prize for Architecture, London 1990
- 1991 – Special Mention – the Iritecna of Europe Award – Milan, Italy
- 1991 – Regional Award – Rennes, France
- 1991 – International Award of Architecture Andrea Palladio
- 1992 – Oscar du Design, Le Nouvel Économiste, Paris
- 1996 – Golden Lion of the Venice Biennale of Architecture, with Benoît Cornette
- 1996 – Best Steel Construction Awards – Paris, France – Banque Populaire de l’Ouest
- 1999 – Benedictus Awards – Washington, USA – University of Nantes
- 2001 – Commander of the Order of Arts and Letters, France
- 2003 – Knight of the National Order of the Legion of Honor, France
- 2005 – Passeport Artiste Sans Frontière – AFAA Paris, France
- 2006 – International Architecture Awards – Chicago Athenaeum – L. Museum
- 2007 – International Fellowship of the Royal Institute of British Architects, RIBA
- 2007 – Show Boats International Awards – Monaco – Esense Wally 143.
- 2008 – World Architecture Community Awards – Sea Passenger Terminal in Tanger
- 2008 – World Architecture Community Awards – Macro
- 2008 – Culture World Architecture Festival – Barcelona – Greenland Pavilion
- 2008 – Athenaeum International Architecture Award – GL Events HQ
- 2009 – MIPIM AR Future Project Award – GL Events HQ
- 2010 – Premio di Architettura Ance Catania – Macro
- 2010 – Athenaeum International Architecture Award – Tangier Med Sea Passenger Terminal
- 2012 – Paris Shop & Design Award – Cafes, Restaurants – Phantom
- 2012 – Ecola Award – Phantom
- 2013 – Women in Architecture Prize, ARVHA
- 2013 – MAISON&OBJET Designer of the Year
- 2013 – Athenaeum International Architecture Award – Phantom
- 2014 – Médaille de Vermeil et d’Honneur de l’Académie d’Architecture
- 2014 – Dedalo Minosse Special Prize – Marco
- 2015 – Targhe d’Oro / Gold Plaque – Unione Italiana Disegno
- 2015 – Nanjing Municipal Architecture Prize – Tangshan Museum
- 2015 – Jiangsu Provincial Architecture Award – Tangshan Museum
- 2015 – Doctorate honoris causa in architecture, Université Laval
- 2015 – Blueprint Award – Saint-Ange Residence – Best Non-public Use Residential Project
- 2016 – National Wood Construction Prize – Saint-Ange Residence
- 2016 – Jane Drew Prize, Architects' Journal
- 2016 – Athenaeum International Architecture Award – Tangshan Museum
- 2017 – NYCXDesign Award – Soleil Noir – Best Suspension Lamp
- 2017 – Architizer A+Awards — Lifetime Achievement Award
- 2018 - European Cultural Centre Architecture Award, Venice
- 2018 - Honorary Fellowship of the Royal Institute of the Architects of Ireland
