= Colin Jeavons =

Welsh retired actor and television presenter (born 1929)

- Born: Colin Abel Jeavons; 20 October 1929 (age 97); Newport, Monmouthshire, Wales
- Education: Old Vic Theatre School
- Occupations: Actor, television presenter
- Years active: 1946–1993 • 2007
- Spouse: Rosie Jeavons (m. 1965; died 2018)
- Children: 2

Colin Abel Jeavons (born 20 October 1929) is an English retired actor and television presenter, having trained at the Old Vic Theatre School. He is known for his character roles and has worked in theatre, television and film, especially in literary adaptations and roles related to the works of Charles Dickens.

== Career ==
Jeavons' started his career in Birmingham Repertory Theatre in a production of Shakespeare's Twelfth Night in 1946, and also worked for such companies as the Bristol Old Vic, Royal Court Theatre and the Royal Shakespeare Company. His earliest television role was as Jules Neraud in an episode of the 1956 anthology series of teleplays Nom-de-Plume.

Jeavons began appearing in BBC literary adaptation roles including a production of Pride and Prejudice, an association with Dickens productions on BBC Television began in 1959 with Bleak House as Richard Carstone, and Great Expectations (for the first time) as Herbert Pocket. The same year he played Prince Hal/Henry V in the BBC's The Life and Death of Sir John Falstaff. In 1963 he played the extremely reluctant hero Vadassy forced into espionage in Epitaph for a Spy for BBC Television.

Jeavons portrayed Uriah Heep in the BBC's David Copperfield (1966). Only one episode featuring him (episode 11, "Umble Aspirations") is known to exist. He appeared in a host of 1960s and 1970s TV programmes including Doctor Who (in The Underwater Menace), Adam Adamant Lives! as a murderous fashion designer, as the undertaker Shadrack in Billy Liar (1973), as businessman Leonard Gold in The Sweeney (in the 1978 episode "The Bigger They Are"), as shop owner Ellery in Shoestring in the episode "Where Was I?" (1980) and The Avengers (in "A Touch of Brimstone" and "The Winged Avenger"). Pete Stampede and Alan Hayes wrote of Jeavons in the latter series as "one of those under-rated, ever-present supporting actors who never turn in a bad performance." On children's TV, he hosted Play School for a time, and read "The Black Vicar" on Jackanory. He also appeared in the 1981 Doctor Who spin-off K-9 and Company, and he narrated two BBC children's animated series, namely Barnaby and Joe.

He appeared in the Play for Today production of David Edgar's play about British neo-Nazis, Destiny (1978). The same year he played the part of Mr. Johnson, a schoolteacher, in Peter McDougall's BBC supernatural drama Tarry-Dan Tarry-Dan Scarey Old Spooky Man. He appeared as Samson Brass in another BBC Dickens production, The Old Curiosity Shop (1979), and in another version of Great Expectations (1981), this time as Wemmick. The same year he played a recurring UFO-obsessed character in the sci-fi comedy Kinvig. His most critically acclaimed role during this period was as the neglected and abused child, Donald, in Dennis Potter's Blue Remembered Hills (1979).

In the 1980s, Jeavons was involved with two dramatisations of Sherlock Holmes stories. He played "with chilling authority" in the words of writer David Stuart Davies, Professor Moriarty in The Baker Street Boys (1982), and "with great panache" Inspector Lestrade in the Granada Television series The Adventures of Sherlock Holmes (featuring Jeremy Brett as Holmes). Producer Michael Cox of the Granada Television series stated frankly that they were given the best Lestrade of his generation. In the 1981 TV production of The Hitchhiker's Guide to the Galaxy, he portrayed Max Quordlepleen, an entertainer who hosts at Milliways, the Restaurant at the End of the Universe.

Jeavons was Briggs, the lawyer who halts the marriage between Jane and Rochester, in a BBC version of Jane Eyre (1983). In 1984, he played the existentialist philosopher Søren Kierkegaard in the "Prometheus Unbound" episode of Don Cupitt's Sea of Faith for BBC. The following year he played Adolf Hitler in Hitler's SS: Portrait in Evil. He played the solicitor Vholes in another BBC adaptation of Bleak House in 1985. In 1986 he was seen in Paradise Postponed.

Jeavons featured in the 1990 television drama House of Cards by Michael Dobbs, as Tim Stamper, Tory Whip and ally of Ian Richardson's Francis Urquhart. The character returned – promoted initially to Chief Whip, then to Party Chairman – in the 1993 sequel, To Play the King. Jeavons played Del Boy's lawyer, Solly Atwell, in Only Fools and Horses. He also played the role of Genrikh Yagoda in the 1992 television film Stalin.

Jeavons also appeared in many films over the years, often as priests or vicars. These included roles in The Devil's Daffodil (1961), Frankenstein Created Woman (1967), Sleep Is Lovely (1968), The Oblong Box (1969), The Games (1970), Bartleby (1970), Diagnosis: Murder (1975), Schizo (1976), The Island (1980), The French Lieutenant's Woman (1981), Absolute Beginners (1986) and Secret Friends (1991). Jeavons retired from acting in 1993; his final role was a reprise of Tim Stamper in To Play the King.

== Personal life ==
Jeavons' elder son Barney managed the British rock band Reuben, and in 2007 Jeavons emerged from retirement, heavily bearded, to appear as the enigmatic General in Reuben's Rock video "Blood, Bunny, Larkhall". In a behind-the-scenes short, Jeavons explained briefly some of the highlights of his acting career.

== Filmography ==
Year	Title	Role
1956	Nom-de-Plume (TV series)	Jules Neraud (1 episode)
1957–58, 1960	ITV Television Playhouse (TV series, 3 episodes)	Harry Leak - Niko - Stephens
1958	Television World Theatre (TV series)	Yasha (1 episode)
1958	The Black Arrow (TV series)	Rutter (1 episode)
1958	Pride and Prejudice (TV series)	Mr. Wickham (3 episodes)
1958	Yvette (TV movie, film debut)	Xanrof
1958	The Firm of Girdlestone (TV miniseries)	Farintosh
1958	The Lost King (TV series)	Karl Von Ense
1959	The Life and Death of Sir John Falstaff (TV series, 6 episodes)	King Henry V - Prince Henry
1959	Danton's Death (TV movie)	St. Just - Executioner
1959	Great Expectations (TV miniseries)	Herbert Pocket
1959	World Theatre (TV miniseries)	Jack Barthwick - St. Just - Executioner
1959	Sunday Night Theatre (TV series)	Hotel manager
1959	Bleak House (TV miniseries)	Mr Vholes, solicitor (2 episodes)
1960	A Matter of Degree (TV series)	Julian
1960	Boyd Q.C. (TV series)	1 episode
1960	The Small House at Allington (TV series)	John Eames
1961	Saturday Playhouse (TV series)	John Gourley. Jnr.
1961	Solitaire (TV movie)	Philippe
1961	The Devil's Daffodil (English version)	Peter Keene
1960–1961	ITV Play of the Week (TV series)	Patrick Oman - Steven Channer - Frederick Ellis
1962	Sir Francis Drake (TV series)	Spanish Officer
1962	Maigret (TV series)	Jean Metayer
1963	Epitaph for a Spy	Joseph Vadassy
1961–1963	BBC Sunday-Night Play (TV series)	The Intruder - Joseph Conrad - John Horner
1963	The Odd Man trilogy (TV series)	Harry Kapp
1964	Moonstrike (TV series)	Guillaume
1964	Theatre 625 (TV series)	Colonel Levin
1965	The Wednesday Play (TV series)	Barry Raines
1965	The Villains (TV series)	Nicholls
1965	The Man in Room 17 (TV series)	Dr. Jim Pearson
1965	Wednesday Theatre (TV series)	Albert
1966	The Liars (TV series)	David
1966	The Baron (TV series)	Tom Stirling
1966	David Copperfield (TV series)	Uriah Heep
1966	Emergency Ward 10 (TV series)	John Edwards
1966	Adam Adamant Lives! (TV series)	Roger Clair
1966–1967	The Avengers (TV series, serial: The Underwater Menace)	Stanton - Darcy
1967	Uncle Charles (TV series)	M. de Grochy
1967	Doctor Who (TV series)	Damon
1967	Mr. Rose (TV series)	Lucius Prentiss
1967	Frankenstein Created Woman	Priest
1967	St. Ives (TV series)	Major Chevenix
1967	The Further Adventures of Lucky Jim (TV series)	Brian
1968	Man in a Suitcase (TV series)	Gaoler
1968	The Ronnie Barker Playhouse (TV series)	Gosling
1968	The Jazz Age (TV series)	Perry
1968	Sleep Is Lovely	Butler
1968	Dixon of Dock Green (TV series)	George Sanders
1969	The Oblong Box	Doctor
1969	Detective (TV series)	Dr. Glyn Lawrence
1970	The Hero of My Life (TV movie)	Wilkie Collins
1970	The Games	Earnest Man
1970	Thirty-Minute Theatre (TV series)	Conspirator
1970	The Doctors (TV series)	Frank Ogden
1970	Bartleby	Tucker
1971	Doomwatch (TV series)	Botting
1971	Paul Temple (TV series)	Vasili Paradeisianos
1971	Bless This House	Vicar
1971	Frankie Howerds Hour (TV mini-series)	Actor
1971	ITV Saturday Night Hour (TV series)	Ken Winters
1972	The Shadow of the Tower (TV series)	Sir Robert Clifford
1972	The Dick Emery Show (TV series)	Actor
1970–1972	Scott On... (TV series)	Actor
1973	All Star Comedy Carnival (TV series)	Mr. Shadrack (segment: "Billy Liar")
1973–1974	Billy Liar (TV series)	Mr. Shadrack (23 episodes)
1974	Barnaby (TV series)	Narrator (English Version)
1974	Fall of Eagles (TV mini-series)	Printer
1974	Diagnosis: Murder	Bob Dawson
1966–1975	BBC Play of the House (TV series)	Snake - Kislytsin
1975	Wodehouse Playhouse (TV series)	Stranger
1975	Churchill's People (TV series)	Hon. Robert Boyle
1975	Centre Play	Charles Kingsley
1971–1976	Z Cars (TV series)	Ambulance Man - Potter
1980	Lady Killers	Mr. A.T. Lawrence
1981	K-9 and Company (TV pilot)	George Tracey
1981	The Hitchhiker's Guide to the Galaxy (TV series)	Max Quordlepleen
1984–1994	Sherlock Holmes (TV series)	Inspector G. Lestrade
1985	Hitler's SS: Portrait in Evil (TV movie)	Adolph Hitler

== Bibliography ==
- Starring Sherlock Holmes, David Stuart Davies; Titan Books 2001. ISBN 978-1-840-23250-9
