= Great Expectations (2007 film) =

- Written by: Jesper Wachtmeister
- Directed by: Jesper Wachtmeister
- Starring: Le Corbusier; Oscar Niemeyer; Peter Cook; Buckminster Fuller; Moshe Safdie; Antti Lovag; Superstudio; Archigram; Paolo Soleri; Peter Vetsch; Jacque Fresco
- Music by: Silverbullit
- Original language: English

Production
- Producer: Jonas Kellagher
- Cinematography: Simon Pramsten
- Editor: Jesper Wachtmeister
- Running time: 52 min
- Production companies: Solaris Filmproduktion; Eight Millimetres AB; Sveriges Television

Original release
- Release: 2007

Great Expectations (a journey through the history of visionary architecture) is a 2007 documentary about the history of visionary architecture by director Jesper Wachtmeister. The film uses interviews to frame the history of utopian and visionary architecture through the 20th century. Subjects include Le Corbusier, Oscar Niemeyer, Peter Cook, Buckminster Fuller, Moshe Safdie, Antti Lovag, Paolo Soleri, Peter Vetsch and Jacque Fresco.

== Reception ==
Dagens Nyheter reviewer Tomas Lisinski wrote that "the astounding images of more or less bizarre projects were intertwined with a fantastic interview material. This was also a documentary that treated the viewer seriously. We were assumed capable of following a train of thought, and understanding interviews without meddlesome guidance.”(translated from Swedish)" Leonardo reviewer Michael R. Mosher wrote that "the architects articulate their visions, and the camera explores at least one of the major built accomplishments of each. Wachtmeister brings to his documentary a fun and light touch, with little bits of Monty Python-style animation, hand-colored photographs, even flying saucer noises. Archigram, and its London Pop Art-influenced publications, made him do it! Sometimes it's as if the filmmaker really doesn't put much stock in the promised completion of the Venus Project, but was happy to enjoy the trek in bejungled Florida alongside its talkative old planner Jacques Fresco.”"
