= Christophe Aribert =

French chef (born 1971)

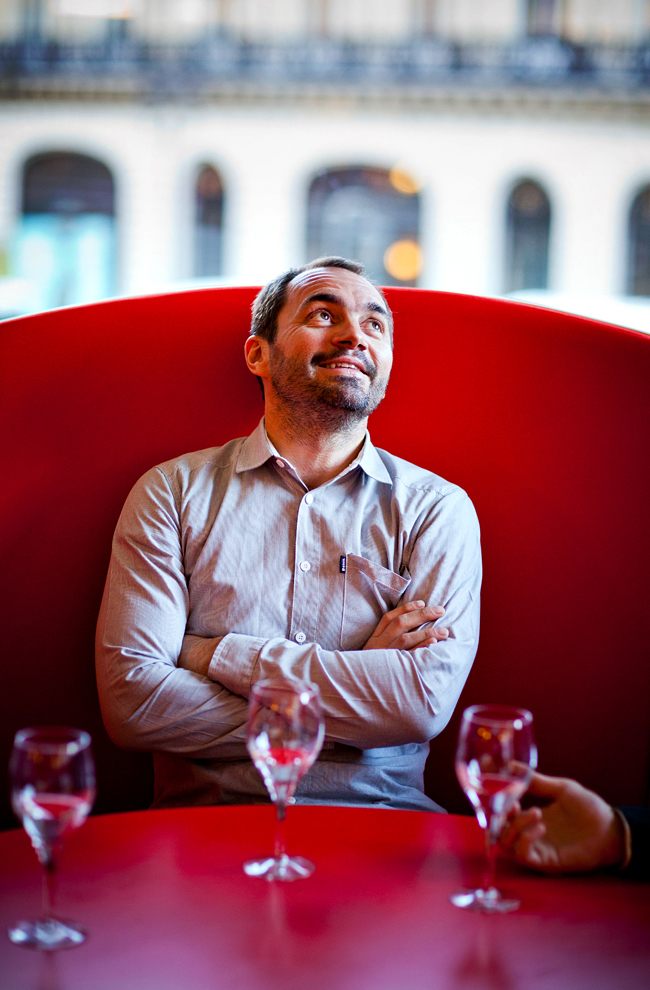
- Christophe Aribert at L'Opera Restaurant
- Born: 24 May 1971 (age 54); Grenoble, France
- Culinary career
- Rating(s): Michelin stars
- Current restaurant(s): Les Terrasses in Uriage
- Website: http://www.grand-hotel-uriage.com

Christophe Aribert (born 25 April 1971, Grenoble, Isère) is a French chef with two Michelin stars and 4 toques Gault Millau. He runs the kitchen of the restaurant at the Grand Hotel Les Terrasses at Uriage-les-Bains.

== Education ==
Christophe Aribert graduated at the hotel school in Grenoble.

== Career ==
Christophe Aribert began his career at the Hotel Beau Rivage in Condrieu in 1991. A few years later he tasted the first time the kitchen of the restaurant Les Terrasses in Uriage in 1993. In 1995, he moved to Paris and officiates at Tour d'Argent in 1995–96 and then at Les Ambassadeurs at the Hôtel de Crillon in 1996–97 alongside Christian Constant.

In 1997, he returned to the restaurant Les Terrasses in Uriage, the restaurant of the Grand Hotel, once frequented by Coco Chanel, Sacha Guitry and Maurice Chevalier, Stendhal, Alphonse Daudet... In 2004, chef Philippe Buissou left Uriage. Christophe Aribert takes over and keep the two stars.

In November 2007, he published La Brigade Christophe Aribert by Glénat, a cookbook showcasing his brigade, with the help of Pierre-François Couderc for the photos, Pierrick Jégu for the texts and Georges Riu for the illustrations. 46 recipes are presented and illustrated by numerous photographs showing the various stages of completion and revealing a number of tricks.

In cooperation with photographer Pierre-François Couderc, he won in June 2009 the culinary photo contest of Oloron-Sainte-Marie.

That summer he was asked to become the chef of the Crillon following the departure of Jean-François Piège. He declined the offer in order to stick to his roots in Uriage.

In June 2011 he designed the menu of the long-awaited restaurant of the Paris Opera, Palais Garnier, L'Opéra Restaurant.
