= Great Expectations (disambiguation) =

Great Expectations is an 1860 novel by Charles Dickens.

Great Expectations may also refer to:

== Adaptations of the Dickens novel ==
- Great Expectations (1917 film), a silent, black-and-white version starring Jack Pickford as Pip
- Great Expectations (1934 film), a Hollywood production directed by Stuart Walker
- Great Expectations (1946 film), a British film directed by David Lean
- Great Expectations (1974 film), a television version, directed by Joseph Hardy
- Great Expectations (musical), a 1975 stage musical by Cyril Ornadel and Hal Shaper
- Great Expectations (1967 TV series), a 1967 television serialisation, directed by Alan Bridges
- Great Expectations (1981 TV series), a BBC serialisation, starring Graham McGrath as young Pip
- Great Expectations (1989 TV series), a 1989 British serialisation, directed by Kevin Connor
- Great Expectations (1998 film), a Hollywood production directed by Alfonso Cuarón
- Great Expectations (1999 film), a BBC production, directed by Julian Jarrold
- Great Expectations (2011 TV series), a BBC serialization, featuring Gillian Anderson as Miss Havisham
- Great Expectations (2012 film), a British film directed by Mike Newell
- Great Expectations (2023 TV series), a 2023 television serialisation, developed by Steven Knight
- Great Expectations, a 1993 West End musical with music by Mike Read
- Great Expectations, a 1983 novel by Kathy Acker, the opening of which is a plagiarization (though re-written) of Dickens's novel

== Music ==
- Great Expectations, a 1970 album by Kiki Dee
- Great Expectations (album), a 1992 album by Tasmin Archer
- Great Expectations, a 2008 album by Michael Rose
- "Great Expectations", a song by Miles Davis from his 1974 album Big Fun
- "Great Expectations", a song by Eric Carmen from his eponymous 1975 album Eric Carmen
- "Great Expectations", a song by Kiss from their 1976 album Destroyer
- "Great Expectations", a song by The Men They Couldn't Hang from their 1990 album The Domino Club
- "Great Expectations", a song by Cat Power from her 1995 album Dear Sir
- "Great Expectations", a song by Jurassic 5 from their 2000 album Quality Control (album)
- "Great Expectations", a song by Elbow from their 2005 album Leaders of the Free World
- "Great Expectations", a song by The Gaslight Anthem from their 2008 album The '59 Sound
- "Great Expectations", a song by Porcupine Tree from their 2009 album The Incident
- "Great Expectations", a song by Diggy Simmons featuring Bei Maejor from his 2010 mixtape, Airborne
- "Great Expectations", a song by Jonathan Clay, Justin Levine, and Zach Chance from the broadway musical The Outsiders
- "Great Expectation" (song), a 2026 song by Sienna Spiro

== Other uses ==
- Great Expectations (2007 film), a 2007 documentary by Jesper Wachtmeister
- Great Expectations (2018 TV series), a 2018 Chinese television series
- Great Expectations (company), established in 1987 as an SEC rule 12b-2 shell company in the medical field
- "Great Expectations" (Grey's Anatomy), a television episode
- "Great Expectations" (Happy Days), a television episode
- "Great Expectations" (Modern Family), a television episode
- "Great Expectations" (Rising Damp), a television episode
- Hythe Scene, a ferry formerly named Great Expectations used on the Hythe ferry service in Southampton, England
- "Pip" (South Park), also known as "Great Expectations", an episode of the American animated series South Park which parodies Dickens' novel

== See also ==
- "Great Xpectations", a 2000 episode of Dawson's Creek
