= Pierre Bernard (industrialist) =

French industrialist (1922–1991)

Pierre Bernard (1922–1991) was a French industrialist, best known for commissioning the Palais Bulles (Bubble Palace), a large house in Théoule-sur-Mer, near Cannes, France, designed by the Hungarian architect Antiti Lovag, and built between 1975 and 1989. After his death in 1991, it was bought by the fashion designer Pierre Cardin.

Bernard was an industrialist active in the field of automobile distribution since the 1950s.
