= L'Opéra restaurant =

Former restaurant in Paris, France

Coordinates: 48.8720826°N 2.3327065°E

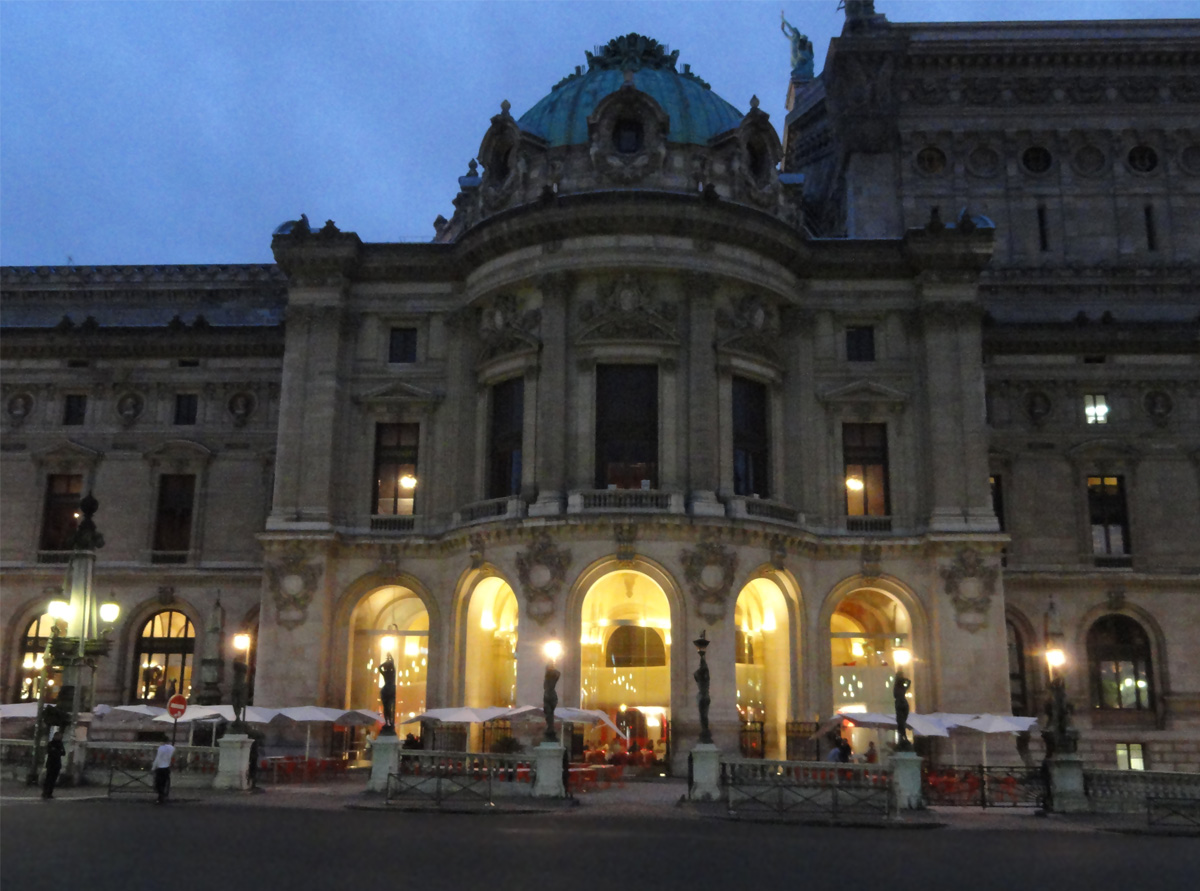
L'Opéra restaurant in 2011

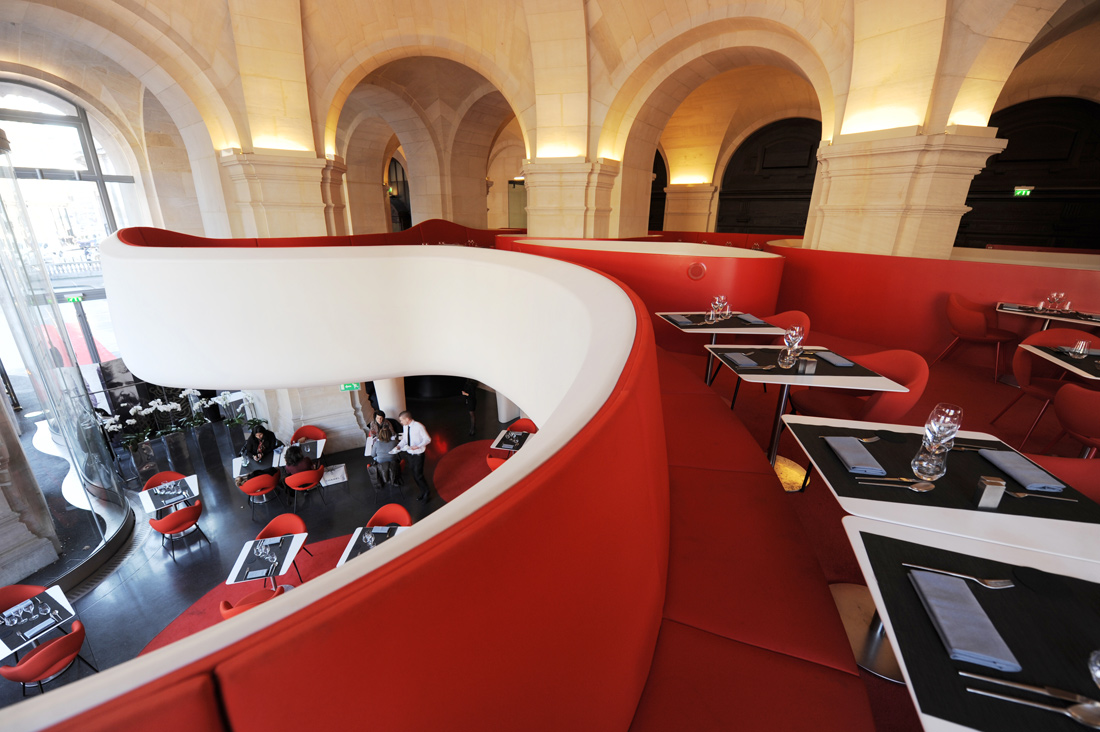
View from the mezzanine to the ground floor level, 2011

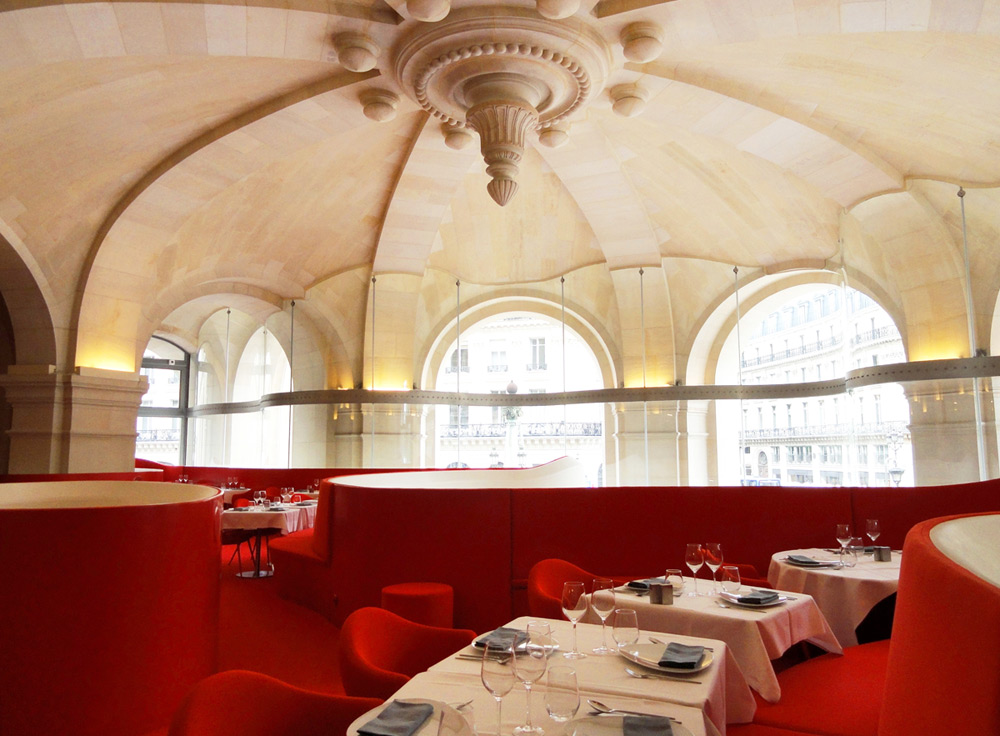
Ceiling of cupola above the mezzanine

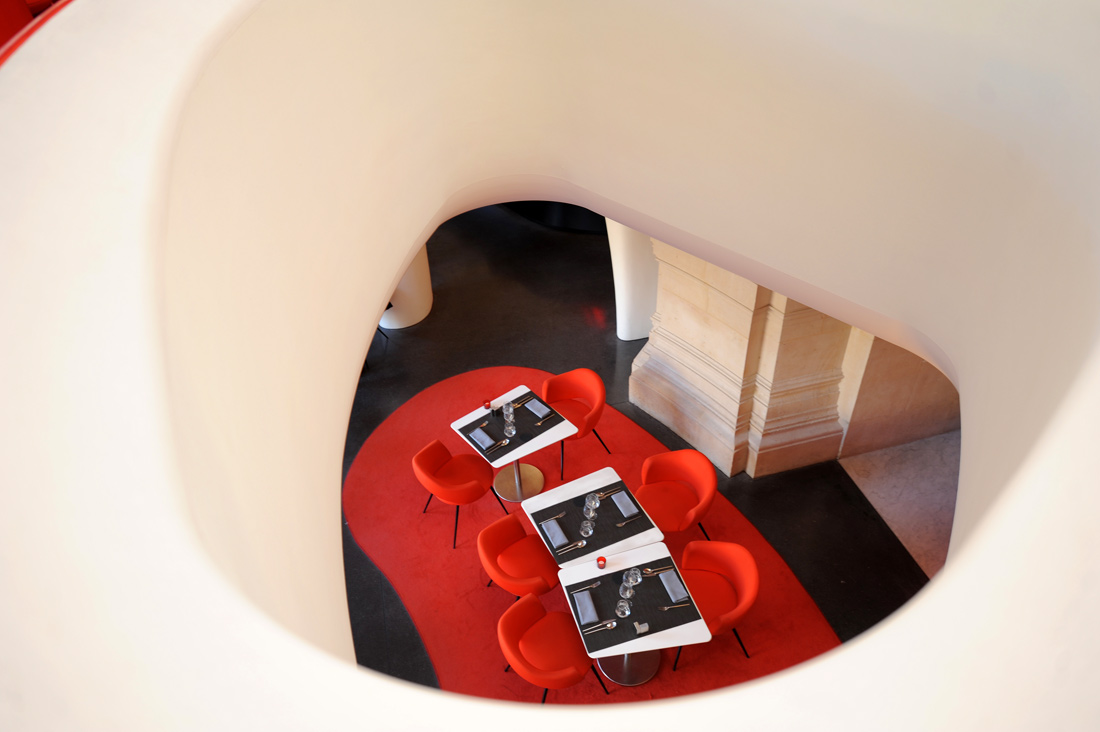
Oculus in the floor of the mezzanine

L'Opéra restaurant is a former restaurant in Paris, built into the east facade of the Palais Garnier opera house at Place Jacques Rouché, at the intersection of rue Gluck and rue Halévy in the 9th arrondissement. The restaurant premiered in 2011 and was replaced in 2019 by CoCo.

== History ==
A restaurant had been proposed since the beginning of architect Charles Garnier's plans for the opera house, which opened in 1875. Lack of funds prevented the realization of the plan, and also two attempts in the 20th century to open a restaurant there, by composer Rolf Liebermann in 1973 and by businessman Pierre Bergé in 1992.

Seeking to broaden audiences for the opera house, director Gérard Mortier advertised for bids in March 2007. In summer 2008 the proposal by Pierre François Blanc was accepted, with the restaurant being granted a 20-year lease by the National Commission of Historic Monuments. The Ministry of Culture rejected the winning architectural design, but in June 2009 approved a replacement design by Odile Decq.

L'Opéra restaurant opened in summer 2011 with a menu designed by Christophe Aribert and head chef Yann Tanneau. Stéphane Bidi became head chef in 2013 and Chihiro Yamazaki in 2016, who redesigned the menu. It served traditional French and Asian-inspired food with an emphasis on fresh produce.

The restaurant closed in 2019 and was replaced by CoCo, owned by the hospitality company Paris Society and designed by Corinne Sachot.

== Design ==
The restaurant is located behind the east facade of the opera house, within a porte cochère at the base of the Rotonde du Glacier which was designed for patrons arriving by carriage. The building is a historic monument, so the architect was required to create the restaurant in a reversible manner, without contact with the original walls, pillars, and other stone structural elements and without concealing the pendant keystone of the domed ceiling above. It was designed to seat 170, 90 on a mezzanine which consists of a moulded plaster hull on a steel skeleton, with a glass facade behind the existing pillars connected to a strip of steel affixed to their tops. Decq called the newly completed restaurant a "phantom", comparing the undulating edges of the white hull to the "white veil" of a ghost; a writer for Architectural Record saw the "sinuous form [as evoking] the Paris Opera's infamous phantom"; The Phantom of the Opera is set at the Opera Garnier.

Decq furnished the restaurant in modern style, with bright red upholstery contrasting with the white hull, which curves up to form the handrail on the stairs and around the mezzanine. The red carpet on the stairs extended in islands on the black floor of the ground floor dining area. The private bar, wrapped around a column, was also black. Decq described the dominant red as lighter than "opera red", "between orange and red". The terrace also had red seating, including large benches.
