= Édith Girard =

French architect

Édith Girard (1949 – 6 September 2014) was a French architect who in particular designed a number of apartment buildings in the Paris area.

== Biography ==
Girard was born and lived in Paris. Girard's main developments include apartment buildings in the 13th and 19th arrondissements of Paris and in the Aunettes district of Évry in the southern suburbs. She also designed the Cité de Kerigonan in Brest. Girard taught at the Paris-Belleville School of Architecture.

== Selected works ==
Among Edith Girard's social housing developments are:

- 227 PLA housing units in the îlot Carnot, Stains (completed 1984)
- 111 PLI housing units, quai de Loire, Paris – Awarded the "Equerre d'argent" (1985)
- 107 PLA housing units in the Aunettes development in Évry (1987)
- 82 PLA housing units and 5 artists' studios in the Rue du Chevaleret, Paris (1990)
- 128 PLA housing units in the Kerigonan quarter, Brest (1990)
- 120 PLA housing units in the îlot Carnot, Stains (1992).
- 62 PLA housing units in the Hautes-Bruyères ZAC development, Villejuif (1993)
- 35 PLI housing units in the Rue de Flandre, Paris (1993)
- 72 PLI housing units in the Rue des Vignoles, Paris (1994)
- 20 housing units in The Hague, Netherlands (1997)
- 94 PLA housing units in Vitry-sur-Seine – Housing Award (1999)
- Conversion of an office building into 41 housing units in the Rue de Turenne, Paris (1999)
- 24 artists' studios in Saint-Ouen (2000)
- 48 PLA housing units in Villejuif (2000)
- 36 PLA housing units in the Malassis quarter, Bagnolet (2001).
