= Palais Bulles =

Villa in Théoule-sur-Mer, France

Coordinates: 43.4886°N 6.94363°E

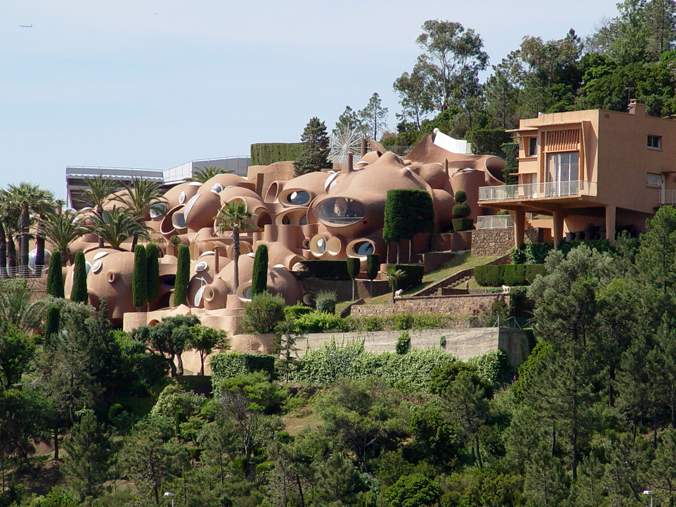
- Interactive map of the Palais Bulles area

General information
- Type: Villa
- Location: Théoule-sur-Mer, France
- Groundbreaking: 1975
- Completed: 1989
- Owner: Pierre Cardin

Design and construction
- Architect: Antti Lovag
- Other designers: Patrice Breteau, Jérôme Tisserand, Daniel You, François Chauvin, Gérard Le Cloarec
- Main contractor: Pierre Bernard

Website
- www.palaisbulles.com

The Palais Bulles (French pronunciation: [palɛ byl]; lit. 'Bubbles Palace') is an iconoclastic villa in Théoule-sur-Mer, near Cannes, on the French Riviera, which was designed by the Hungarian architect Antti Lovag. It was built for the French industrialist Pierre Bernard, and later bought by the fashion designer Pierre Cardin as a holiday home.

== History ==
The 1,200 m^{2} (13,000 sq ft) house was built between 1975 and 1989 for Pierre Bernard, a French industrialist. The architect Antti Lovag hated straight lines as "an aggression against nature" and designed the house as a "form of play—spontaneous, joyful, full of surprise".

Fashion designer Pierre Cardin bought the house after Bernard's death in 1991. While Bernard never actually lived in the building, he said that "[t]his palace has become my own bit of paradise. Its cellular forms have long reflected the outward manifestations of the image of my creations. It is a museum where I exhibit the works of contemporary designers and artists".

In 2016, a five-year renovation by French architect Odile Decq was completed. In March 2017, it was listed for sale with an asking price of €350 million but did not find a buyer. It could be rented to groups for $33,200 a day.

Following Cardin's death in December 2020, it has been suggested that the building be turned into a public venue for art expos.

== Description ==
The house comprises a reception hall, panoramic lounge, 500-seat open-air amphitheatre, 10 bedrooms, various swimming pools and waterfalls in extensive landscaped grounds.

The Palais has 29 rooms, 11 bathrooms, and ten bedrooms that have each been decorated by a specific artist, including Patrice Breteau, Jerome Tisserand, Daniel You, François Chauvin, and Gerard Cloarec.

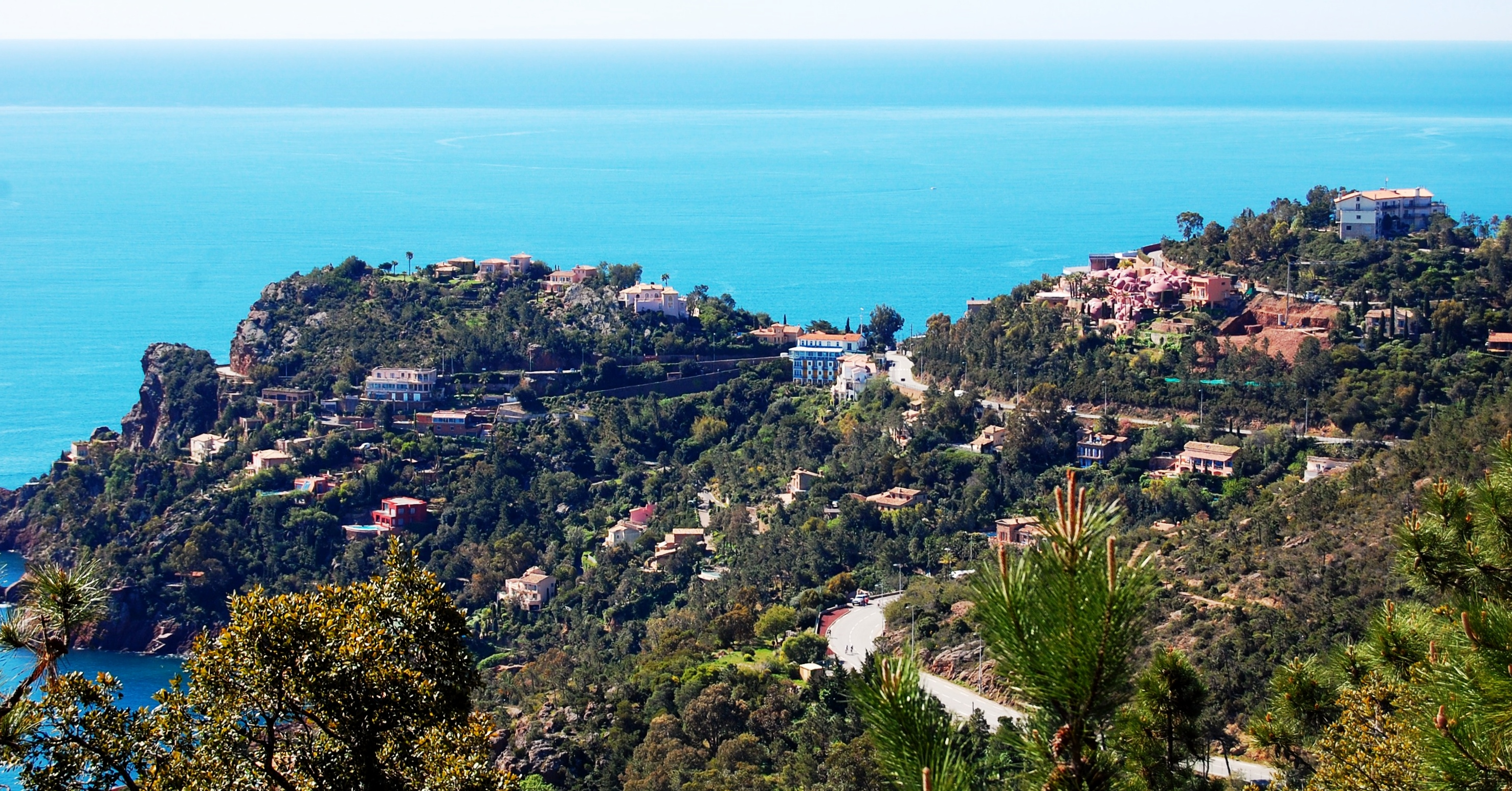
The pointe de l'Esquillon and the "Palais Bulles".

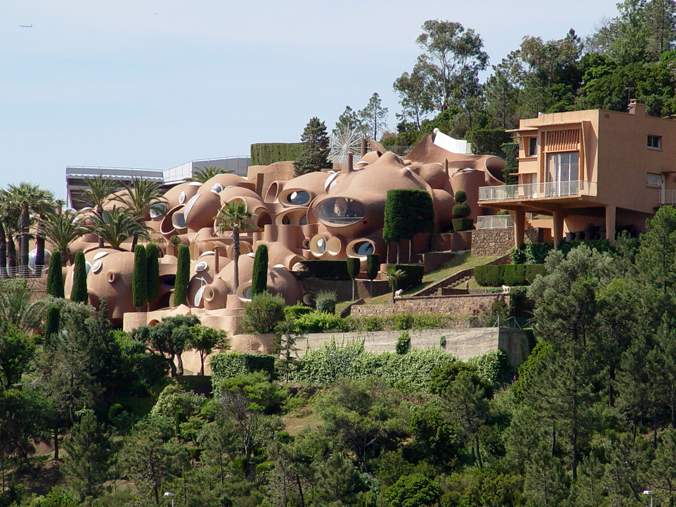
Seaside view.

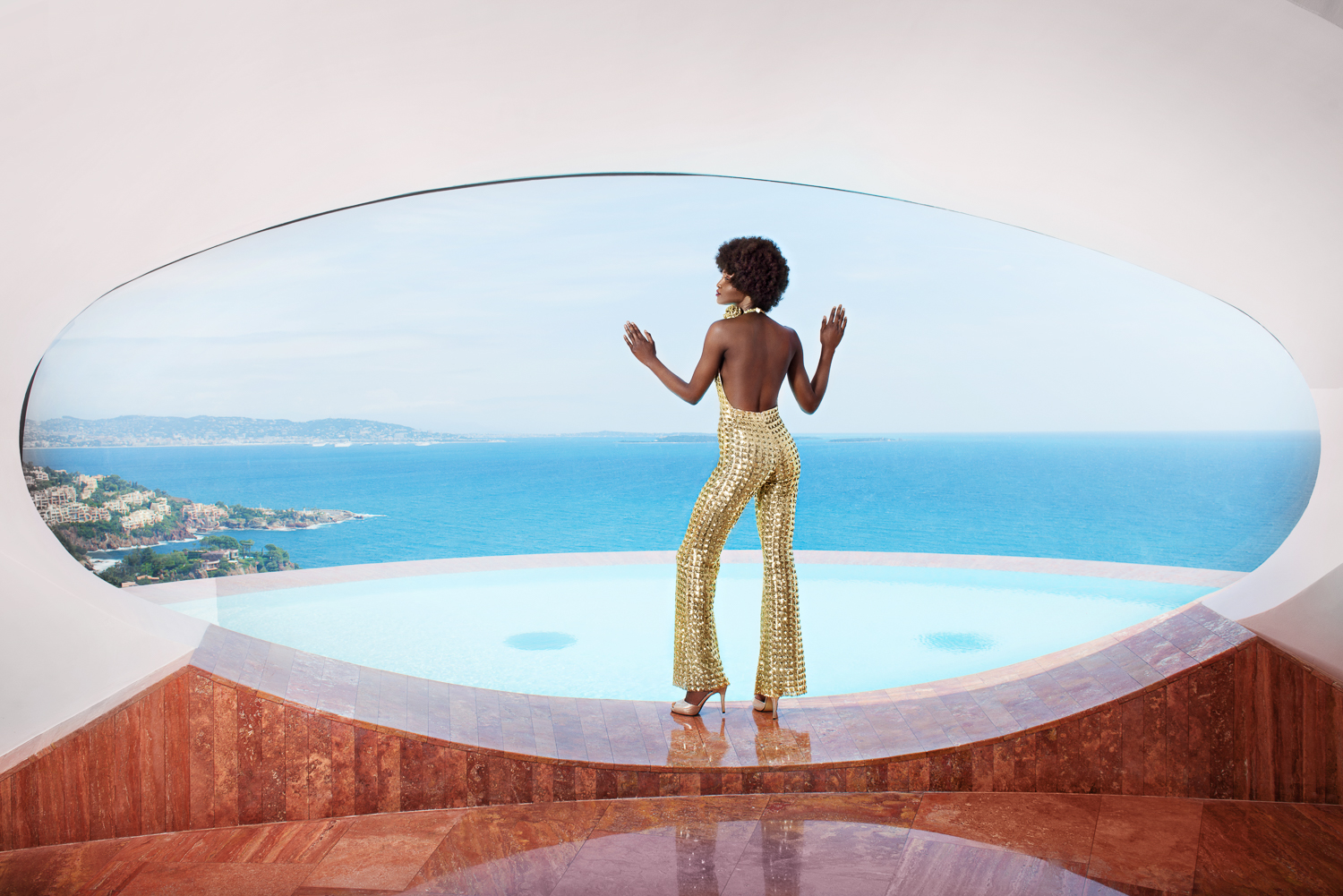
A window in the living room looking out on the Bay of Cannes.

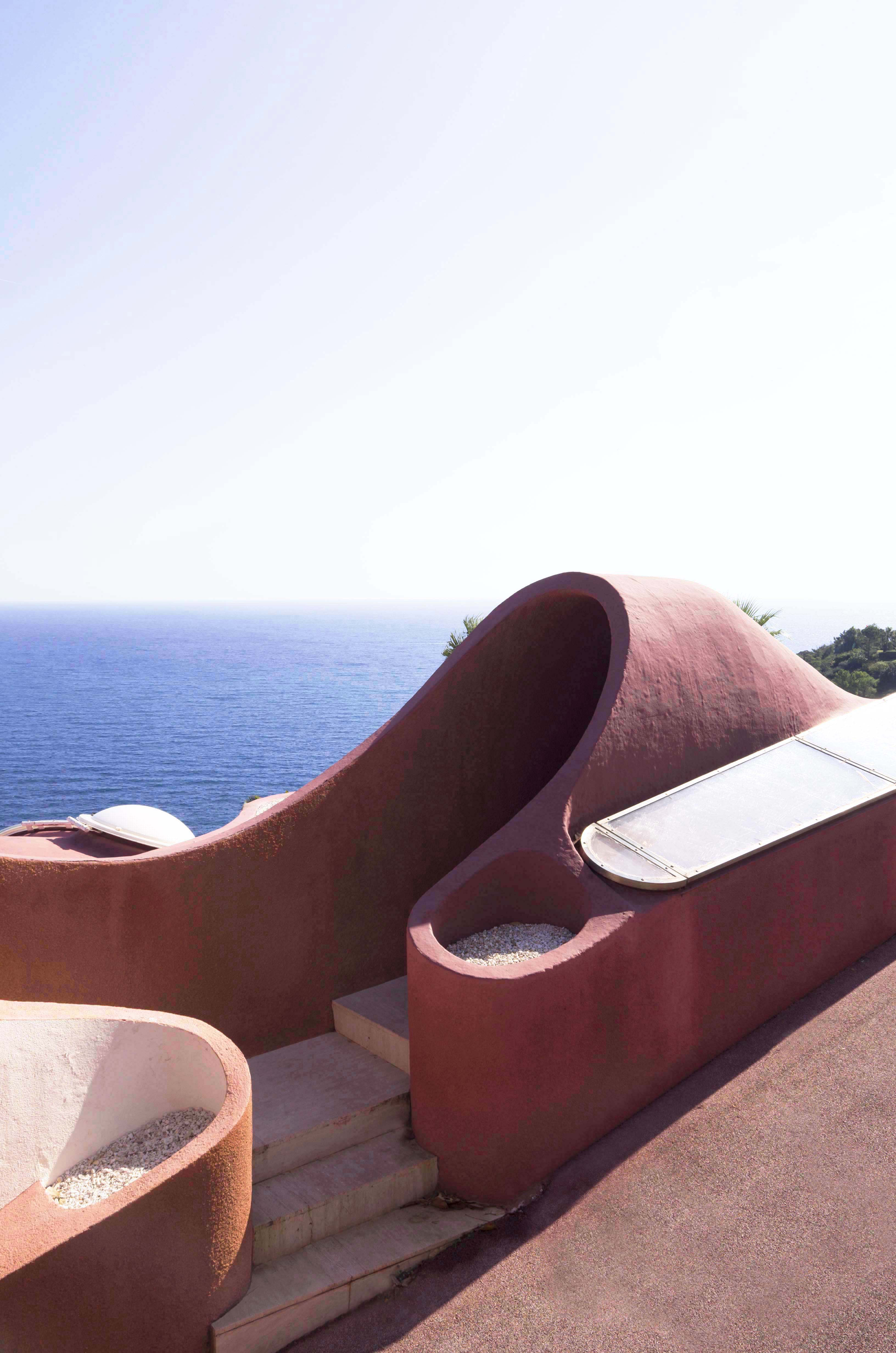
Curvy detail of the house.

== In popular culture ==
Emma Bunton, the British pop singer and former member of the band Spice Girls shot the artwork for her 2004 album Free Me at the house in the summer of 2003.

The house was featured in Absolutely Fabulous: The Movie.

The house was featured in the music video for the lead single 'K-Pop' off rapper Travis Scott's 2023 album Utopia featuring the Weeknd and Bad Bunny

The French band L'Impératrice recorded a session at the house in 2024.
