= Taunusturm =

Residential skyscraper in Frankfurt, Germany

TaunusTurm
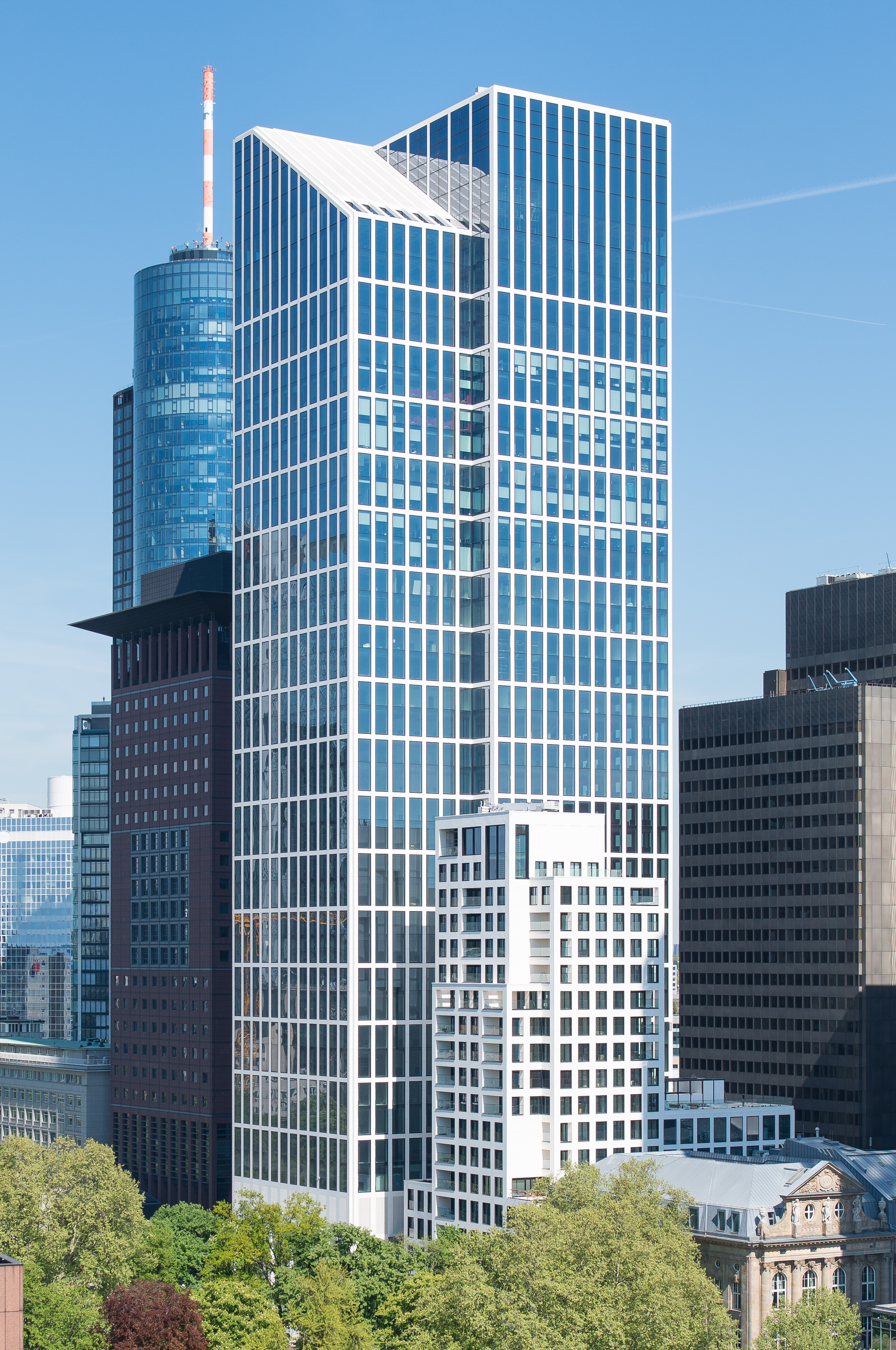
- The towers as seen from South (April 2014)
- Interactive map of the TaunusTurm area

General information
- Status: Completed
- Type: Commercial offices
- Location: Taunustor 1–3; Frankfurt; Hesse, Germany
- Coordinates: 50°06′39″N 8°40′22″E
- Construction started: April 2011
- Opening: February 2014

Height
- Roof: 170 m (560 ft)

Technical details
- Floor count: 40
- Floor area: 85,746 m^{2} (922,960 sq ft)

Design and construction
- Architect: Gruber + Kleine-Kraneburg
- Developer: Tishman Speyer Properties

Other information
- Public transit: Willy-Brandt-Platz; Taunusanlage; 11 Willy-Brandt-Platz

TaunusTurm (originally Kaiserkarree) is the project name for a complex of two buildings, a 170 m (560 ft) skyscraper and a 63 m (207 ft) high-rise residential building, in Frankfurt, Germany. The site is located in Frankfurt's financial district, the Bankenviertel, at the corner of Neue Mainzer Straße and Taunustor. The site borders a park named Taunusanlage, which gave the tower its name (the Taunus is a low mountain range north of Frankfurt). The buildings were designed by architecture firm Gruber + Kleine-Kraneburg. The project developer is real estate building and operating company Tishman Speyer which also built the Messeturm and the Opernturm in Frankfurt. The start of construction was in April 2011 and the first tenants moved in February 2014.

== History ==
In 1998 the City of Frankfurt approved a new high-rise development plan which specifies where new skyscrapers are allowed to be built in the city. One of the approved locations was the estate owned by Commerzbank and Rheinhyp at Taunustor, right at the heart of Frankfurt's financial district. The development plan envisioned a 135 m (443 ft) high-rise building for the property, named Kaiserkarree. In 2000 architecture firm Gruber + Kleine-Kraneburg won an architecture competition for the planned tower, but the project slowed down after the Dot-com bubble burst in 2000 and the September 11 attacks in 2001. Meanwhile the Rheinhyp became part of real estate bank Eurohypo and moved to Eschborn, therefore Commerzbank took over responsibility for the property.

In 2007 Commerzbank announced that it wanted to sell the property because there was no need to use it for own purposes. At the end of the same year Tishman Speyer and Commerz Real bought the property and said that they would build the tower unchanged from the previous design. It was agreed upon with the City of Frankfurt that a part of the tower would be used for apartments. The demolition of the existing buildings on the property was scheduled to start in spring 2008 but was delayed because Tishman Speyer surprisingly announced that the plans for the tower had changed: Instead of one broad tower they changed the design to two towers, one 160 m (520 ft) and one 60 m (200 ft), and therefore a clear parting between office use and residential use.

Tishman Speyer submitted a building application in 2010 and started the demolition process but shortly after the demolition was once again stopped because the main tenant for the office tower (rumoured to be Clifford Chance) cancelled the contract negotiations. Tishman Speyer then announced that the towers, now called Taunusturm, would not be built in the near future.

In January 2011 demolition works continued and Tishman Speyer officially presented the final design for the towers, again from Gruber + Kleine-Kraneburg: 170 m (560 ft) and 60 m (200 ft). The construction of the towers began in April 2011 and finished in time to open in February 2014.

== Gallery ==
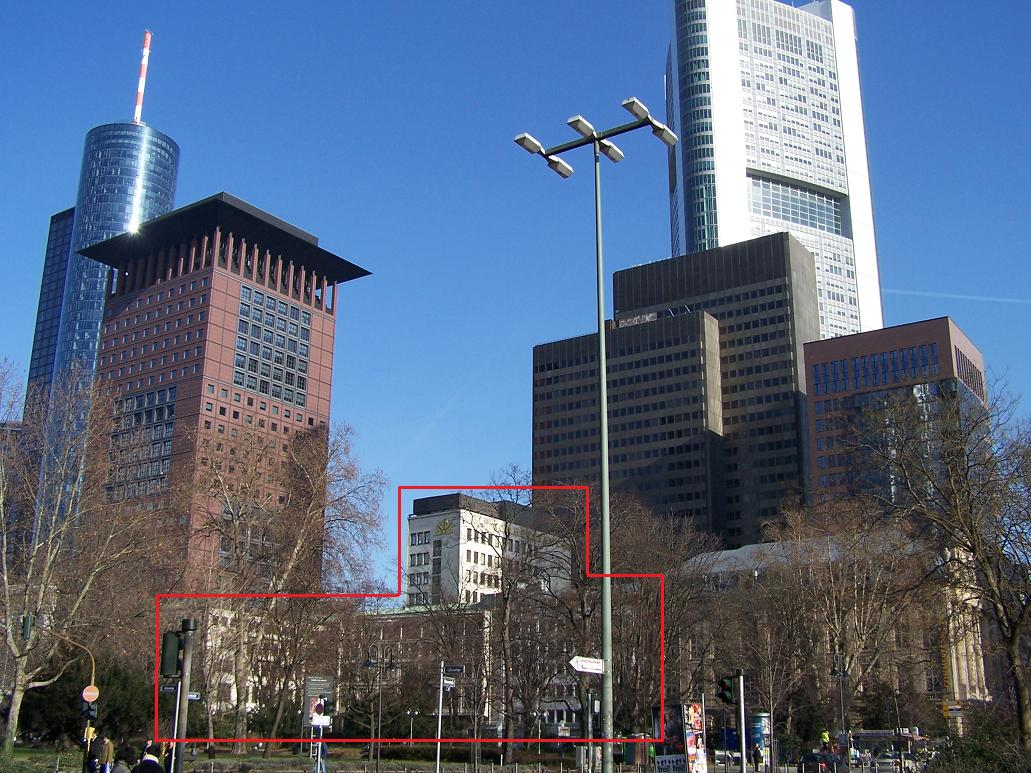
Former buildings (2008), demolished 2011

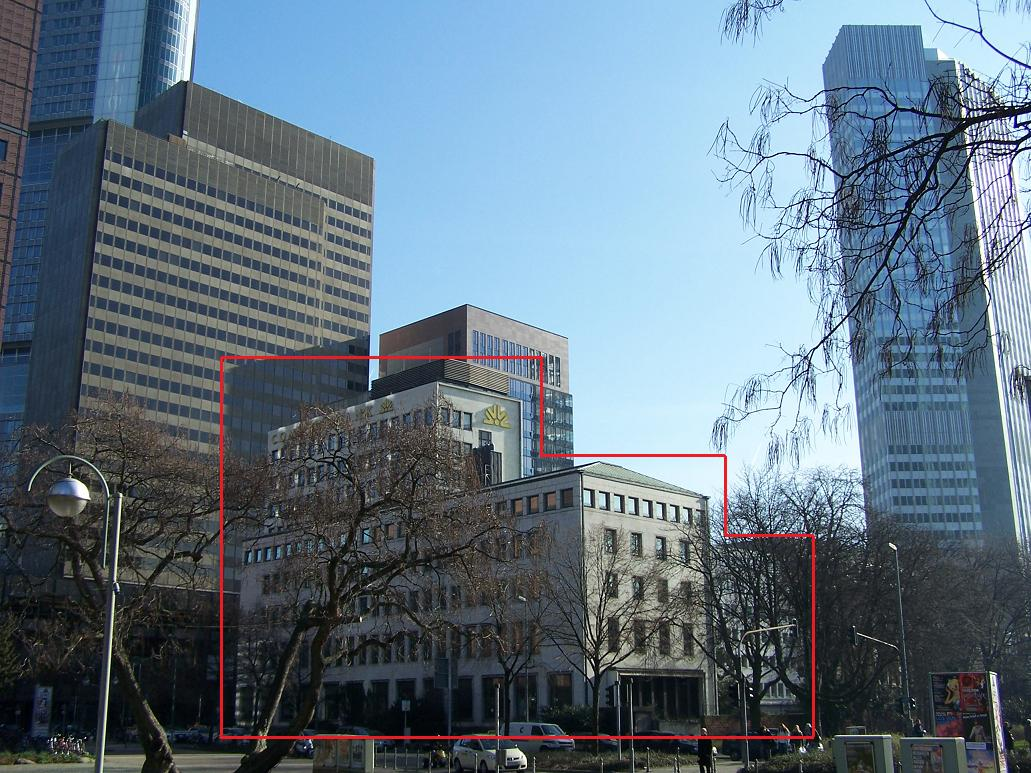
Former buildings (2008), demolished 2011

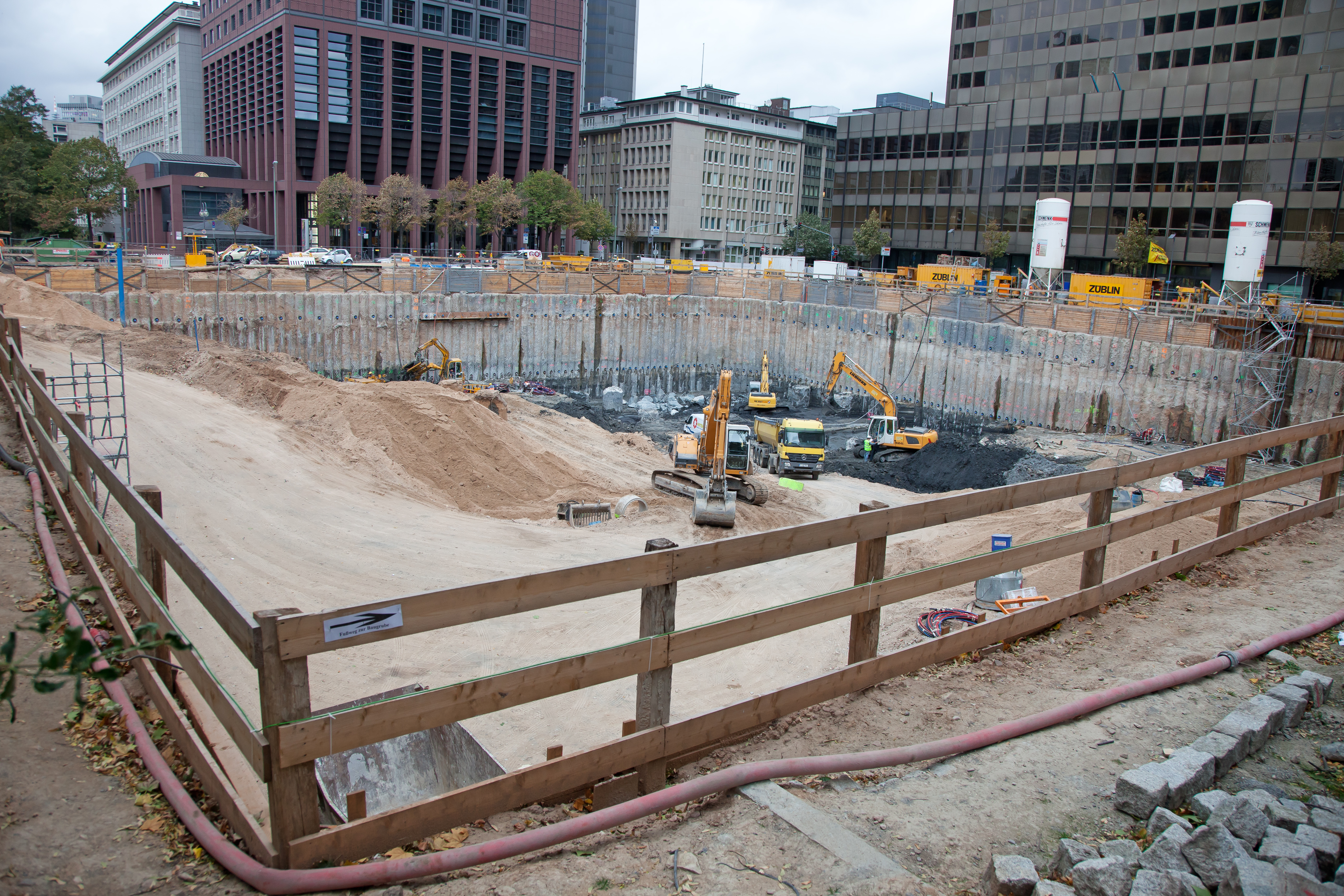
Construction site (October 2011)

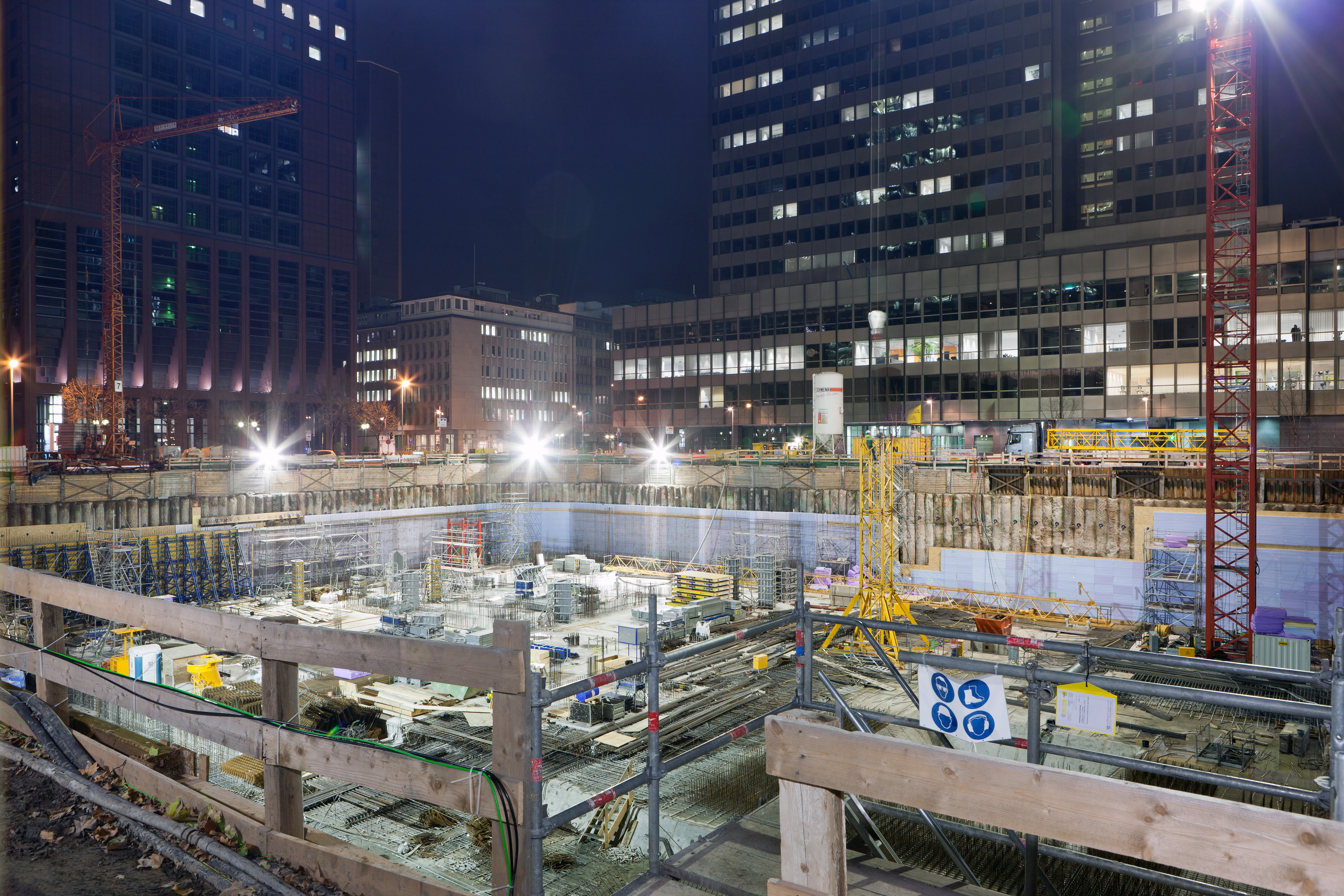
Construction site (December 2011)

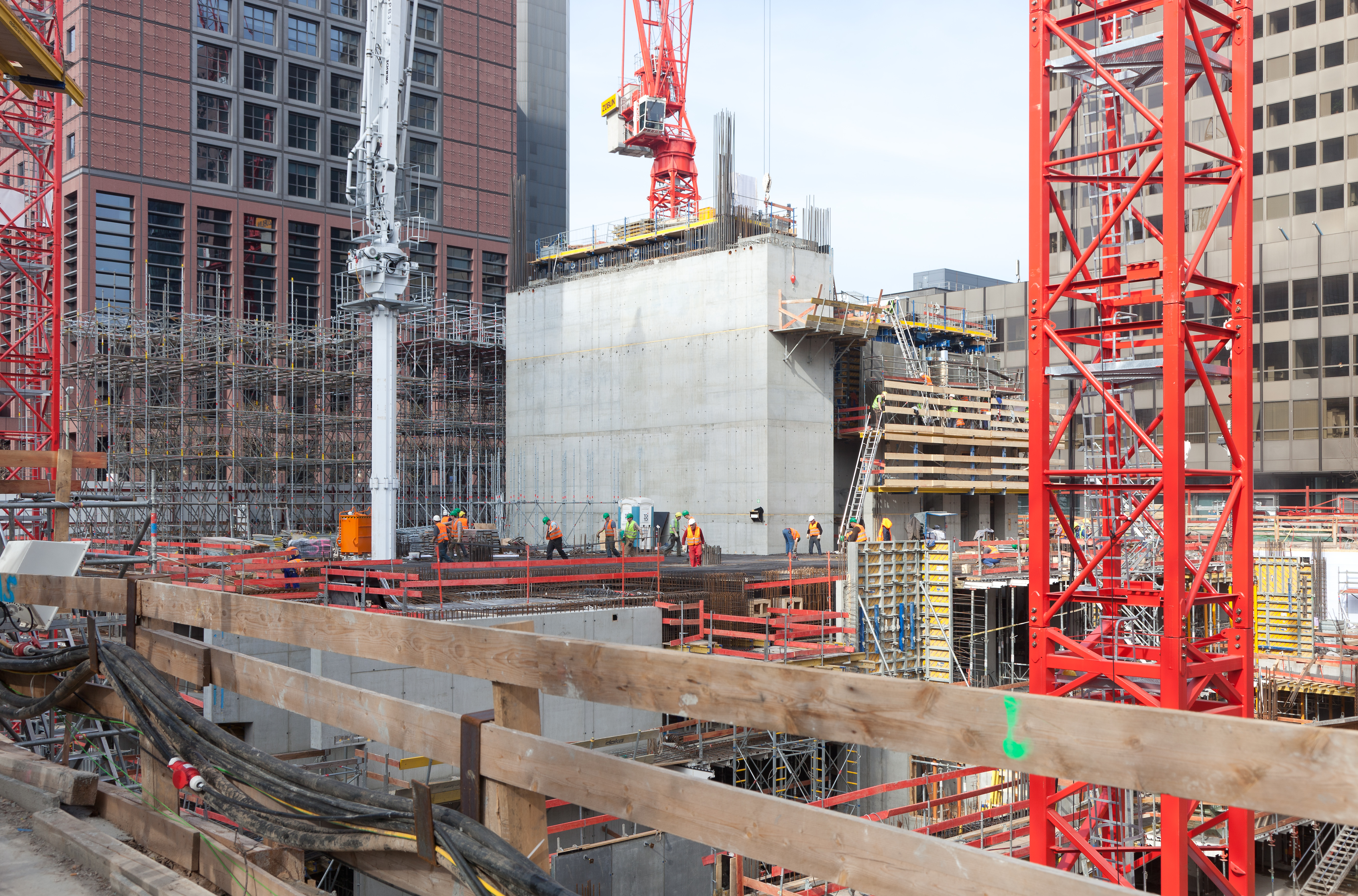
Construction site (March 2012)

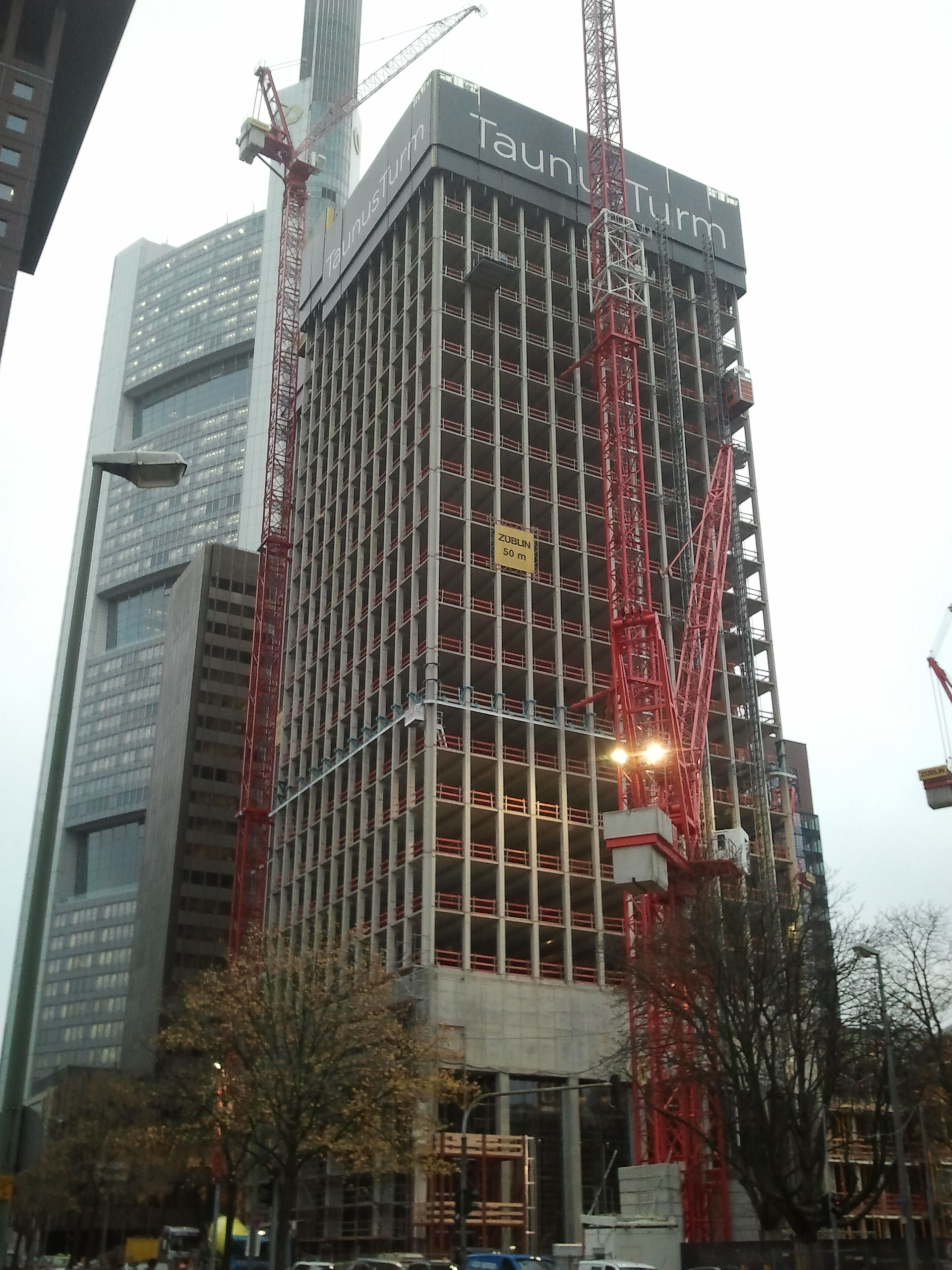
Construction site (November 2012)

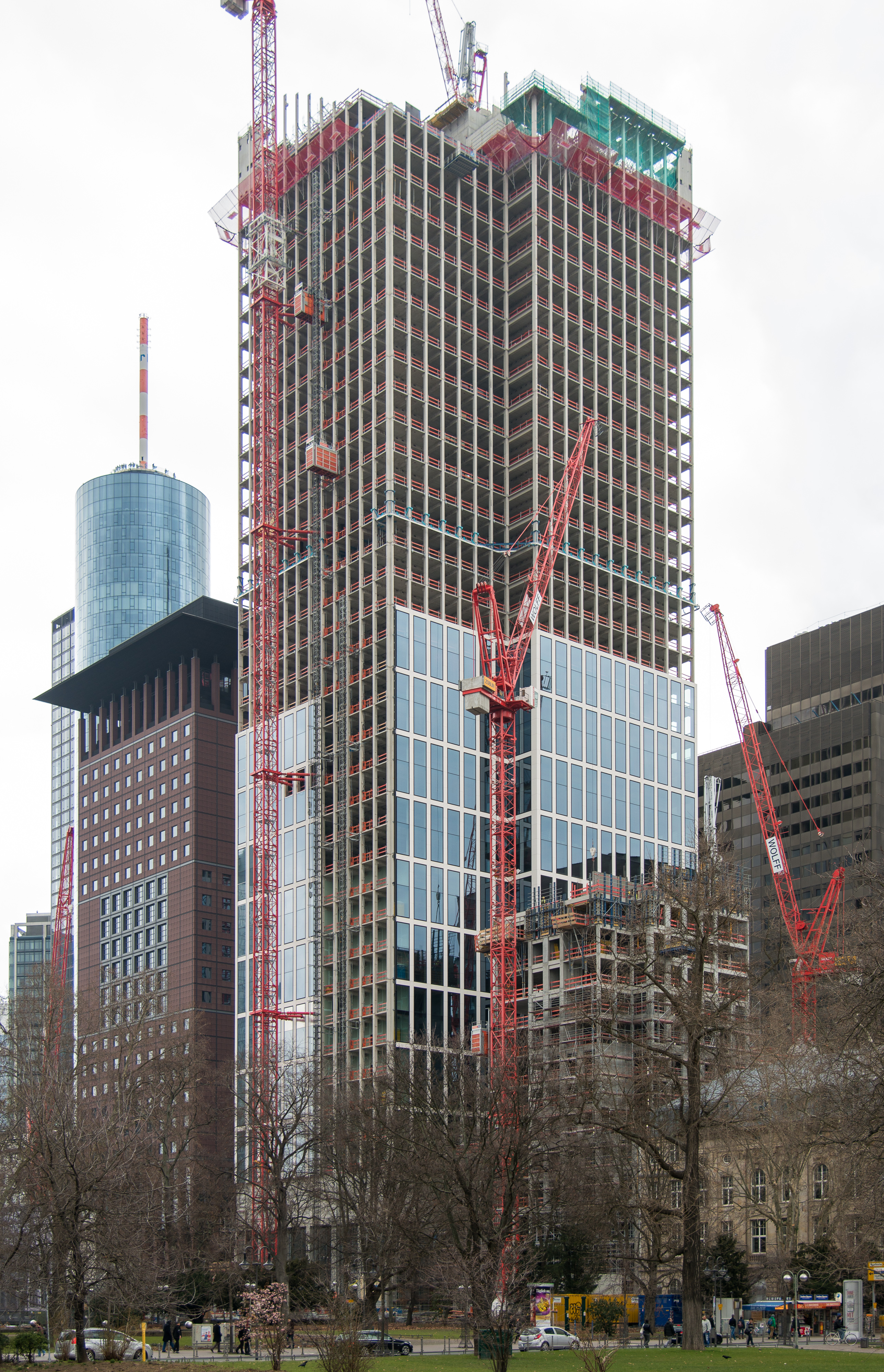
Construction site (March 2013)

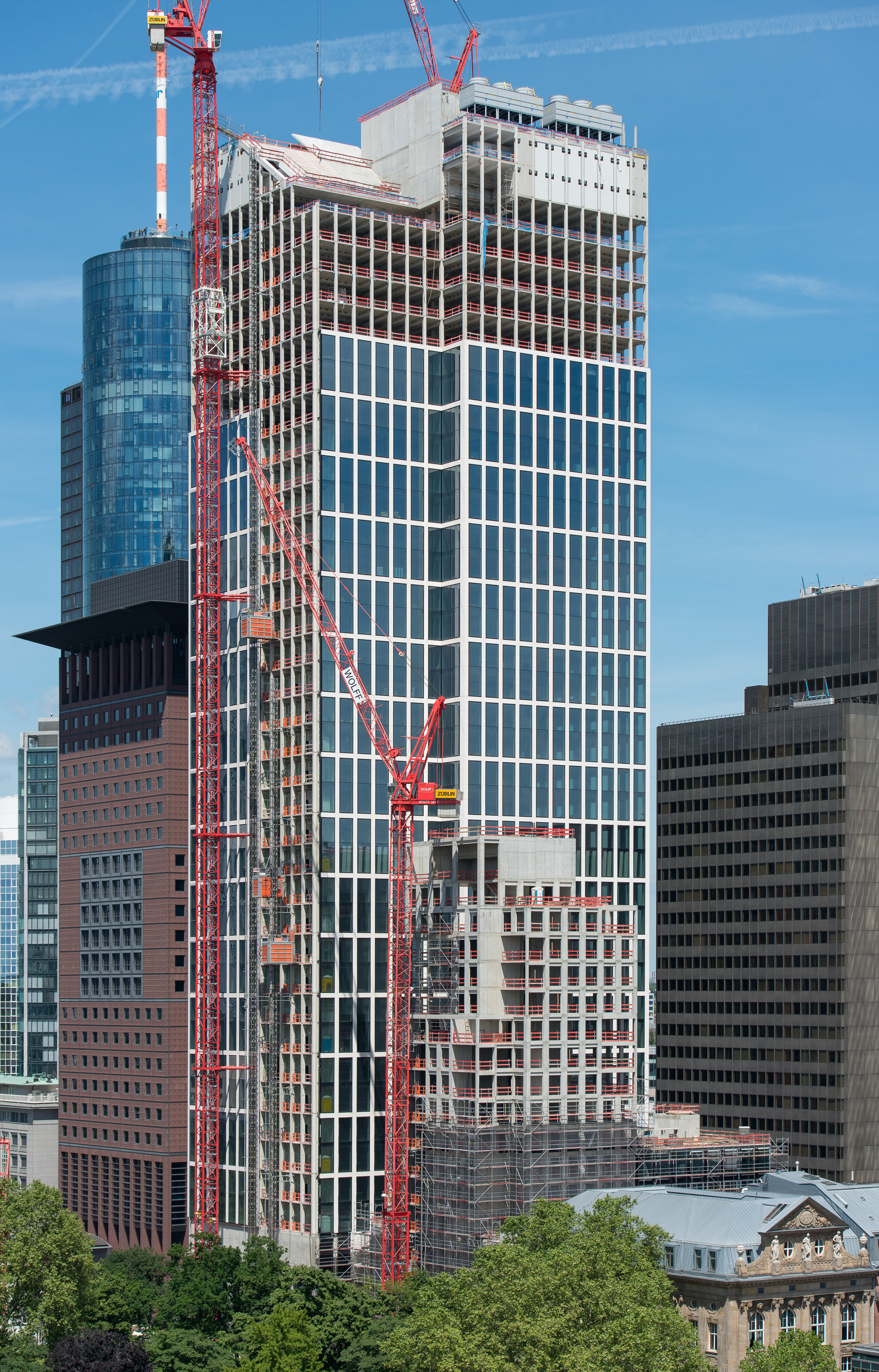
Construction site (June 2013)

== See also ==
- List of tallest buildings in Frankfurt
- List of tallest buildings in Germany
