= Antti Lovag =

Hungarian architect (1920–2014)

Antti Lovag (1920 – 27 September 2014) was a Hungarian architect, by his own definition a habitologist. He is best known for his Palais Bulles (Bubble House) design. His mother was Finnish and father Russian.
