= Ben Ormenese =

Benito Ormenese ( 3 March 1930 – 18 July 2013) was an Italian kinetic artist.

== Biography ==
Ben Ormenese was born in Prata di Pordenone, Province of Pordenone, in 1930. In 1960 he left the faculty of architecture and went to live in Milan where his career started.

Through the gallery owner Silvano Falchi in Milan, Ben Ormenese, was able to show his work in various solo exhibitions in Italy and Germany, and in other exhibitions for example at the Royal Academy of Arts in London, as well as at modern art shows in Switzerland and Germany.

== Career ==
His artworks are recognizable by the "geometrical and three-dimensional aspects he incorporates into them."

Since the 2000s, he has often been compared, for the originality of his exploration of light, to leading artists of European kinetic art such as Alberto Biasi, Edoardo Landi, Hugo Demarco, Horacio Garcia Rossi, Julio Le Parc, Francisco Sobrino, and Franco Costalonga. However, Ormenese remained a solitary artist, dedicated to creating works closely connected to the surrounding environment, regardless of the materials he used during different periods of his long creative career.

In the 1960s (in the LAM series), he incorporated small canvases covered with lamellae into larger surfaces, enclosed in acrylic glass cases painted from the inside to multiply the planes of projection of light and shadows among the forms. In the early 1970s, he experimented with wooden constructions (in the metonymic "Legni" series, lacquered, burned, or treated with impregnants), where the voids in the wall became integral parts of the works. His research during these years led him to exhibit in Italy, Germany, Spain, and the Royal Academy of Arts in London.

In 1978, unexpectedly, he withdrew into solitude, discontinuing his exhibition activity and leaving Milan, where he had moved in the early 1960s. However, upon his return to Friuli, he continued his artistic exploration. In the following years, his works merged the boundaries between painting and sculpture, eventually becoming true sculptures constructed through the assembly of shaped wood pieces. In the last decade of the 20th century, his sculptures became a unique synthesis of aniconism and almost expressionist figural aspiration. After the 2000s, he returned to "paintings," although his works consistently challenged the conventional framing of art, and he began to use light as a structural element to create works that were like "aesthetic machines," capable of blending into the surrounding reality (in the "Levitazioni" and "Teatrini musicali" series).

He lived and worked in Sacile, in the province of Pordenone. In 2014, the Ormenese Archive was established to protect and promote the master's work, with a project to publish a Catalogo Ragionato (Catalogue Raisonné) of his works.
