= Gschwend =

Gschwend may refer to:

== Places ==
- Gschwend, a town in the German state of Baden-Württemberg
- Mrtvice, Kočevje, Gschwend in German, a settlement northwest of the town of Kočevje in southern Slovenia

== People ==
- Brigitte Gyr-Gschwend (born 1964), Swiss Olympic cyclist
- Florence Gschwend (born 1991), Swiss chemical engineer and businesswoman
- Philip Gschwend, American engineer
- Ralfonso Gschwend (born 1959), Swiss kinetic sculptor
