= Groupe de Recherche d'Art Visuel =

Groupe de Recherche d'Art Visuel (GRAV) (Research Group for Visual Art) was a collaborative artists group in Paris that consisted of eleven opto-kinetic artists, like François Morellet, Julio Le Parc, Francisco Sobrino, Horacio Garcia Rossi, Yvaral, Joël Stein and Vera Molnár, who picked up on Victor Vasarely's concept that the sole artist was outdated and which, according to its 1963 manifesto, appealed to the direct participation of the public with an influence on its behavior, notably through the use of interactive labyrinths.

GRAV was active in Paris from 1960 to 1968. Their main aim was to merge the individual identities of the members into a collective and individually anonymous activity linked to the scientific and technological disciplines based around collective events called Labyrinths.

Their ideals enticed them to investigate a wide spectrum of kinetic art and op art optical effects by using various types of artificial light and mechanical movement. In their first Labyrinth, held in 1963 at the Paris Biennale, they presented three years work based on optical and kinetic devices. Thereafter they discovered that their effort to engage the human eye had shifted their concerns towards those of spectator participation; a foreshadow of interactive art.

== Labyrinth 1963 ==
In 1963 GRAV produced a labyrinth for the third Paris Biennial that invited viewers to walk through twenty environmental experiences. Made up of wall mounted reliefs, light installations and mobile bridges in different rooms the labyrinth was meant to invoke different viewer reactions. GRAV argued that viewers' reactions had social implications and the group defined different types of audience interaction with their art, such as: "perception as it is today", "contemplation", "visual activation", "active involuntary participation", "voluntary participation" and "active spectatorship". GRAV published the Assez des Mystification ("Enough Mystification") manifesto alongside the labyrinth, stating that:

If there is a social preoccupation in today's art, then it must take into account this very social reality: the viewer.

To the best of our abilities we want to free the viewers from this apathetic dependence that makes him passively accept, not only what one imposes on him as art, but a whole system of life... We want to make him participate. We want to place him in a situation that he triggers and transforms. We want him to be conscious of his participation...

A viewer conscious of his power of action, and tired of so many abuses and mystifications, will be able to make his own 'revolution in art'.

According to Claire Bishop the GRAV labyrinth installation would today be described as interactive art, rather than participatory art.

== Day in the Street 1966 ==
On April 19, 1966 GRAV created the Day in the Street itinerary (Une Journée dans la rue) in Paris where they invited passing public to involve themselves in various kinetic activities. The itinerary started 8 o'clock in the morning with the GRAV artists handing out small gifts to passengers at the entrance of the Châtelet Metro. At 10 am the public was invited to assemble and disassemble changeable structures on the Champs-Élysées. At midday habitable kinetic objects could be manipulated, and at 2pm a giant kaleidoscope was made available to passers by while balloons floated in the fountain. 6 pm passers by where invited to walk on moveable paving slabs at Montparnasse.

Photos of the installations show Parisians of all ages engaging with all kinds of objects and constructions. According to GRAV the public passes through city streets everyday with habits and actions repeating daily. "We think that the sum total of these routine gestures can lead to total passivity, and create a general need to reaction."

== Critique ==
The Situationist International criticised GRAV's installations for requiring the viewer to fulfill preexisting options devised by the artists. While GRAV and the Situationaists employed similar rhetoric around participation and spectatorship, and both criticised consumerism, GRAV's aim was to achieve a shift in the audiences' perception. Joël Stein later acknowledged that audience interaction with GRAV installations "can become a sort of entertainment, a spectacle in which the public is one of the elements in the work".

Their agreed dissolution in November 1968 was based on their recognition that it was impossible to maintain the rigor of a joint program.
