= Martha Boto =

Argentine artist (1925–2004)

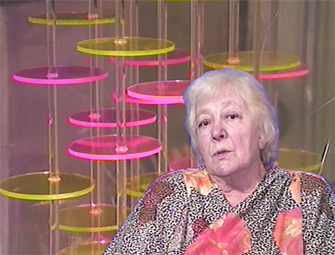
- Martha Boto (1995)
- Born: December 27, 1925; Buenos Aires, Argentina
- Died: October 13, 2004 (aged 78); Paris, France
- Known for: Sculpture
- Movement: Kinetic art
- Spouse: Gregorio Vardanega

Martha Boto (27 December 1925 – 13 October 2004) was an Argentine artist. Boto was born in Buenos Aires, Argentina, and was co-founder of the Group of Non-Figurative Artists of Argentina. She is considered to be a pioneer of kinetic and programmed art.

== Life ==
Coming from a family of artists, where they always supported her in her vocation. She studied drawing and painting at Escuela Superior de Bellas Artes in 1944, and graduated in 1950.

She moved to Paris in 1959 with her husband and collaborator Gregorio Vardanega, where she lived until her death in 2004.

== Work ==
Boto's earliest work was primarily geometric abstractions. During the 50s she had her first concerns regarding space, which ended in creations of structures where she made use of plexiglass with colored water. By 1956, she joined the Concrete art group "Arte Nuevo".

She was among the first artists in Buenos Aires to use movement as a component in her sculptures. In 1957, she started the group Artistas No Figurativos de la Argentina alongside Gregorio Vardanega.

In 1959 she moved to Paris and a year later she took part in the I Biennale de Paris where her career as a kinetic artist took off, her work was centered on the concepts of movement, light and color.

After Boto moved to Paris, Denise René promoted her work. Boto began to incorporate more industrial materials, such as electric motors, into her sculptures at this time.

She was known for her "investigations led on the principle of repetition in the world of reflection". Boto looked for an art capable of awakening different emotions, psychological reactions of joy and tension, an art that could become a medicine for the spirit.

Boto's work is included in international collections world wide, which includes the collection of the Pérez Art Museum Miami, Florida. Her work is on view to the audience as of 2024.

== Representative Artworks ==
- Optical Structure, 1962, plexiglass, 90 x 45 x 45 cm.
- Mouvements chromocinétiques, 1971. MNBA collection, Buenos Aires.

== Personal exhibitions ==
- 2004 - Moving Parts: Forms of the Kinetic, Museum Tinguely, Basel, Switzerland; Kunsthaus, Gras, Austria.

== Collective exhibitions ==
- 1964/65 - Kunsthalle, Museum of Bern, Switzerland.
- 2015 - Un Tournant - A turning point: Antonio Asis, Martha Boto, Horacio García Rossi, Hugo De Marziani, Georgio Vardanega, Sicardi Gallery. Houston, Texas, United States.
- 2021 - Women in Abstraction, Centre Pompidou.

== Bibliography ==
- Herrera, M.J. Real Virtual, arte cinético argentino en los años sesenta. (pág. 211). 1era edición. Buenos Aires. Amigos del Museo Nacional de Bellas Artes (2012).
- Rivenc, R. and Reinhard, B. (2016). Keep it Moving? Conserving Kinetic Art. Los Angeles. Getty Publications.
