= Kinetic art =

Genre of artworks that contains movement

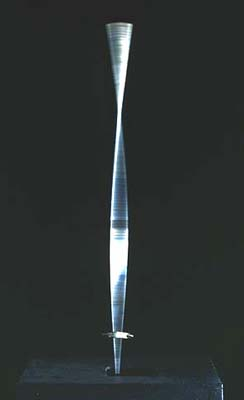
Naum Gabo, Kinetic Construction, also titled Standing Wave (1919–20)

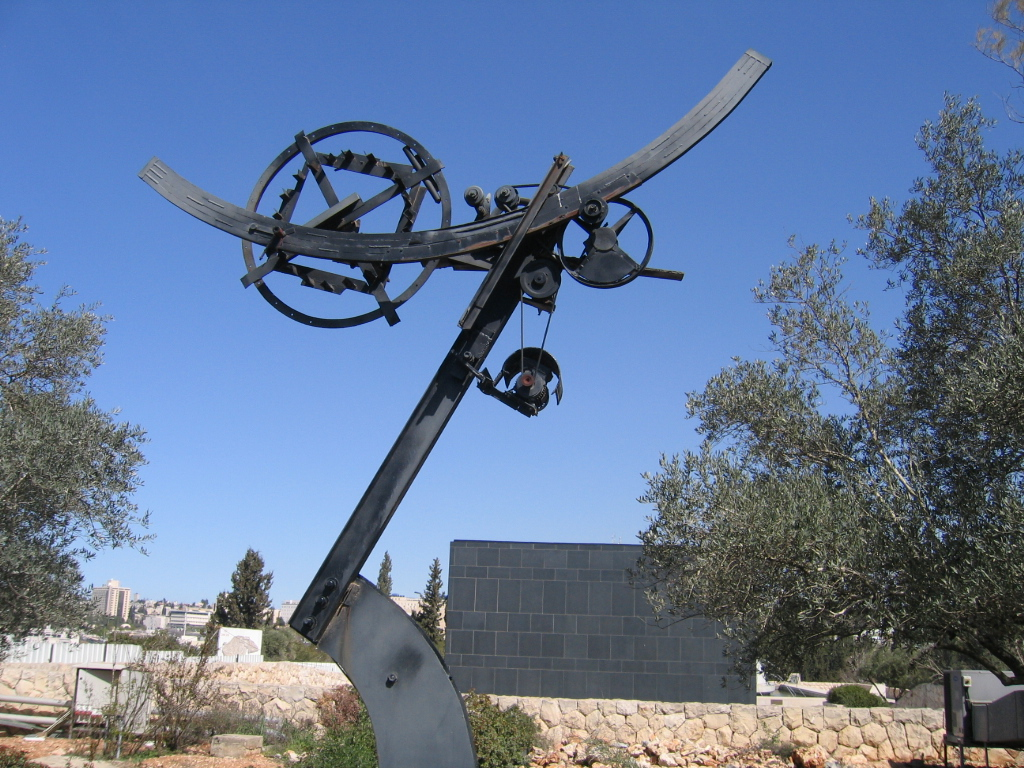
Jean Tinguely, Eos (1965)

George Rickey, Four Squares in Square Arrangement (1969), terrace of the New National Gallery, Berlin

Kinetic art is art that incorporates real or apparent movement. The term has been used for motorized works, works moved or modified by natural forces such as wind or water, works altered through the intervention of the viewer, and static works whose appearance changes as the viewer moves around them. The term partly overlaps with op art, particularly in works based on optical effects.

Early works incorporating actual movement include Marcel Duchamp's Bicycle Wheel (1913), Naum Gabo's motor-driven Kinetic Construction (1920), and László Moholy-Nagy's Light Prop for an Electric Stage, also known as the Light-Space Modulator (1930). Alexander Calder initially used motors to move some of his abstract sculptures before turning to air currents and other changes in the surrounding environment to produce less predictable movement.

The 1955 exhibition Le Mouvement at the Galerie Denise René in Paris was a landmark in the development of kinetic art. It included works by Yaacov Agam, Pol Bury, Calder, Duchamp, Robert Jacobsen, Jesús Rafael Soto, Jean Tinguely and Victor Vasarely. Tinguely became particularly associated with motor-driven sculptural machines. During the 1960s, exhibitions devoted to kinetic art were organized across Europe and a number of artist groups formed around experiments with movement, optical effects and viewer participation.

== Early development ==
Experiments with actual movement in modern art appeared before kinetic art was established as a distinct tendency. In 1913, Marcel Duchamp mounted a bicycle wheel on a stool to make Bicycle Wheel. The work later came to be regarded as an important precursor of kinetic art.

Movement became an explicit concern in Constructivist theory and practice after the Russian Revolution. In their 1920 Realistic Manifesto, Naum Gabo and Antoine Pevsner rejected static artistic rhythms in favor of what they called kinetic rhythms. Around the same time, Gabo made Kinetic Construction (Standing Wave), in which a motor caused a metal rod to oscillate, producing the appearance of a three-dimensional volume.

Other Constructivists explored movement without motors. Around 1920, Alexander Rodchenko made suspended geometric constructions from sheets of plywood cut into concentric forms. Once opened into three dimensions and hung from the ceiling, the constructions could move in air currents.

László Moholy-Nagy began work on his Light Prop for an Electric Stage, later known as the Light-Space Modulator, in 1922 and completed it in 1930. The electrically powered rotating construction used metal, glass and plastic components to produce changing reflections, shadows and patterns of light.

Alexander Calder began making wholly abstract compositions after visiting Piet Mondrian's studio in 1930. His early abstract sculptures included motor-driven works, followed by works whose parts moved freely in response to air currents and other changes in their surroundings. Marcel Duchamp coined the term mobile for Calder's moving sculptures in 1931; Jean Arp subsequently used the term stabile for Calder's stationary abstract works.

== Postwar emergence ==
Kinetic art gained wider attention during the 1950s. Galerie Denise René in Paris was one of its main venues. Its exhibition Le Mouvement, held from 6 to 30 April 1955, included works by Yaacov Agam, Pol Bury, Alexander Calder, Marcel Duchamp, Robert Jacobsen, Jesús Rafael Soto, Jean Tinguely and Victor Vasarely.

Works by Agam, Soto and Vasarely changed in appearance as the spectator moved around them. Some works could be altered directly by visitors, while Tinguely showed sculptures driven by motors. Calder's mobiles and Duchamp's earlier experiments were included as precedents.

Tinguely's sculptures of the 1950s used wheels, drive belts and electric motors. In 1960 he constructed Homage to New York for the sculpture garden of the Museum of Modern Art in New York. Built from motors, bicycle wheels, a player piano and other found materials, the work was intended to destroy itself during a single performance.

Nicolas Schöffer developed motorized and cybernetic sculptures during the 1950s. Takis began using magnetic forces in his work in the late 1950s. Soto used layered surfaces and repeated elements to create optical effects that changed as the viewer moved.

== International expansion and op art ==
Bewogen Beweging, held at the Stedelijk Museum Amsterdam in 1961, included more than 200 works by artists from 18 countries. It was subsequently shown at Moderna Museet in Stockholm and at the Louisiana Museum of Modern Art near Copenhagen. The exhibition included kinetic art, performance, happenings and film, as well as static works concerned with movement.

The Groupe de Recherche d'Art Visuel (GRAV) was formed in Paris in 1961 by Horacio Garcia Rossi, Julio Le Parc, François Morellet, Francisco Sobrino, Joël Stein and Yvaral. At the 1963 Paris Biennale, the group presented Labyrinthe, an environment in which light, movement and the spectator's actions formed part of the work. GRAV also presented works collectively or anonymously. The group dissolved in 1968.

In Zagreb, the Gallery of Contemporary Art, now the Museum of Contemporary Art, Zagreb, organized the first New Tendencies exhibition in 1961. Five exhibitions were held between 1961 and 1973. They included programmed, kinetic and lumino-kinetic art, while later editions also dealt with computer art and visual research.

Op art often relied on perceptual rather than physical movement. Static patterns and color relationships could create impressions of vibration or motion, while some works changed in appearance as the spectator moved.

The Museum of Modern Art exhibition The Responsive Eye, organized by William C. Seitz in 1965, helped popularize op art. It included approximately 125 works by almost 100 artists. Fully kinetic sculpture was not included; the exhibition concentrated instead on perceptual effects, including works whose appearance changed with the position of the viewer. Participants included Agam, Soto, Le Parc and Yvaral.

In 1970, Kinetics: An International Survey of Kinetic Art at the Hayward Gallery in London included works by 68 artists. Its selector, Theo Crosby, noted that earlier definitions of kinetic art had included op art, light art, inflatables, happenings and performance, but concentrated the exhibition on mechanical art.

== Later developments and conservation ==
In 2013, the MIT Museum opened 5000 Moving Parts, an exhibition of kinetic art featuring works by Arthur Ganson, Anne Lilly, Rafael Lozano-Hemmer, John Douglas Powers and Takis. The museum described the surrounding program as a "year of kinetic art", with exhibitions, public events and teaching related to the subject.

Public installations include ART+COM's Kinetic Rain (2012) at Singapore Changi Airport, made from 1,216 suspended droplets moved by computer-controlled motors. Christian Moeller's Daisy at the same airport responds to the movement of nearby visitors through built-in sensors.

Since the 1960s, kinetic artworks have incorporated increasingly complex mechanical, electronic and digital systems. Movement also creates particular conservation problems. Motors and other components wear out, and older electrical and electronic systems can become obsolete. Operating a work can itself contribute to its deterioration. Conservators may therefore have to decide whether to maintain or replace components, replicate a mechanism, or retire a work from operation.

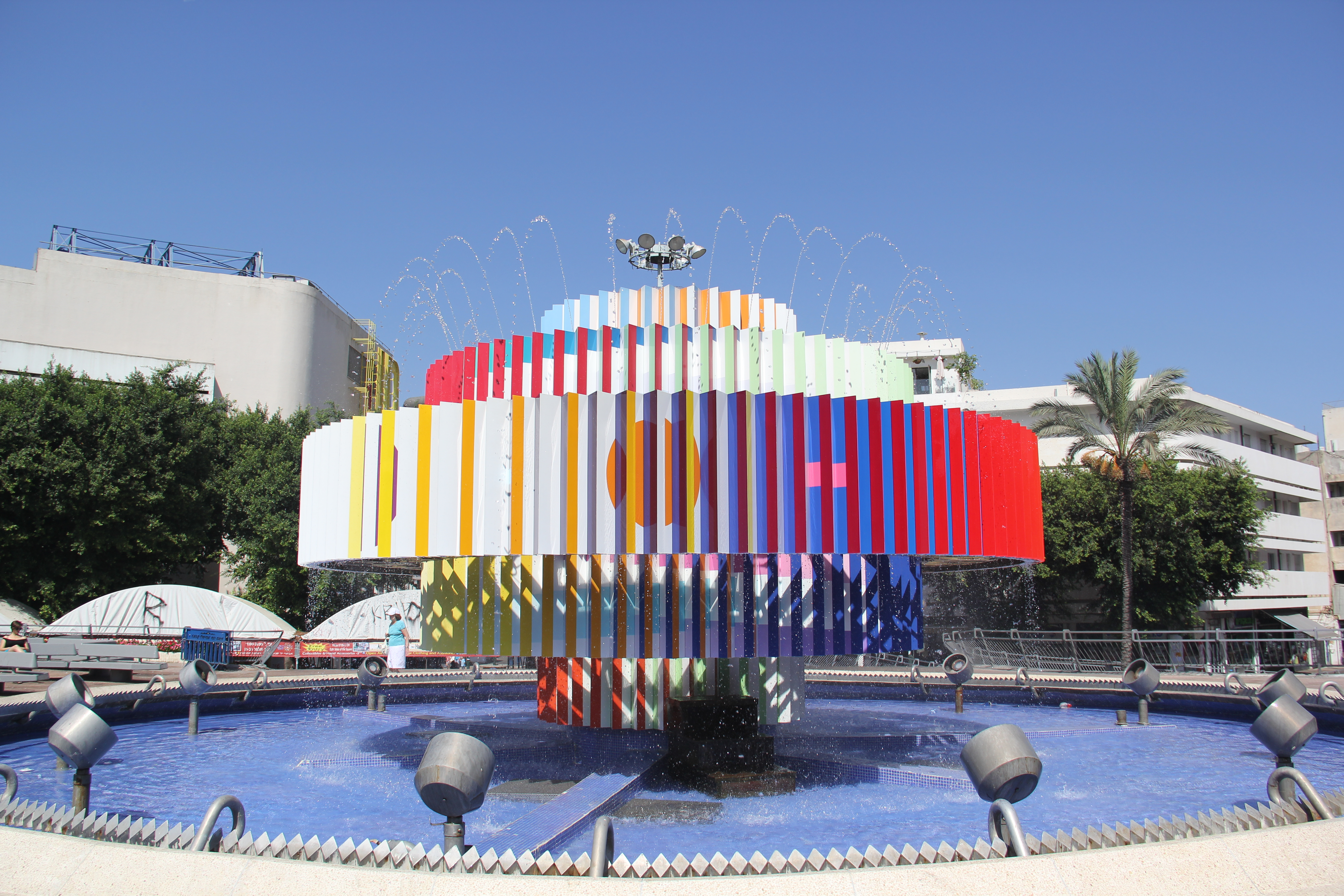
Yaacov Agam, Fire and Water Fountain (1986), Dizengoff Square, Tel Aviv. The work combines kinetic and optical effects.

== Selected works ==
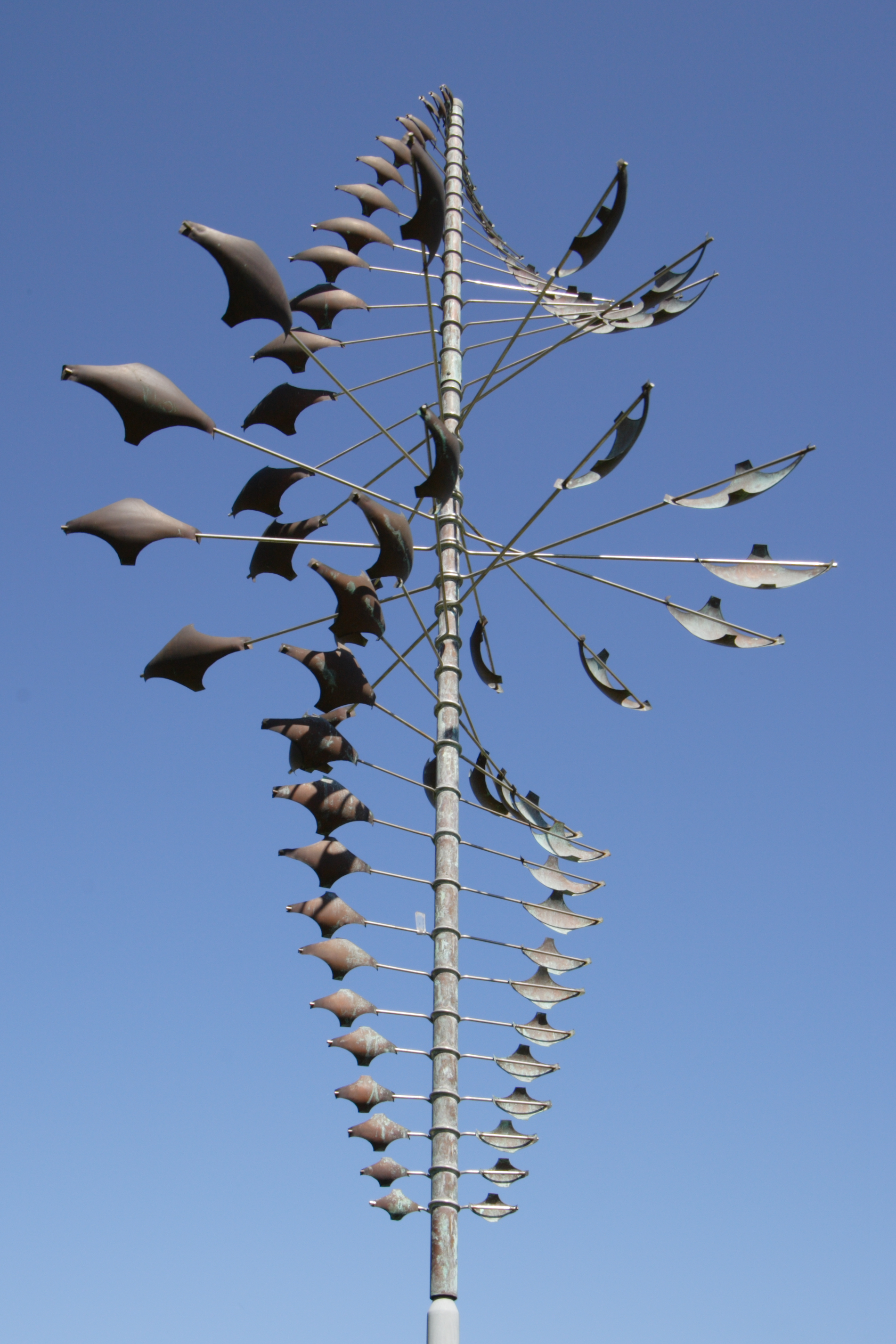
Lyman Whitaker, The Twister Star Huge, a whirligig sculpture

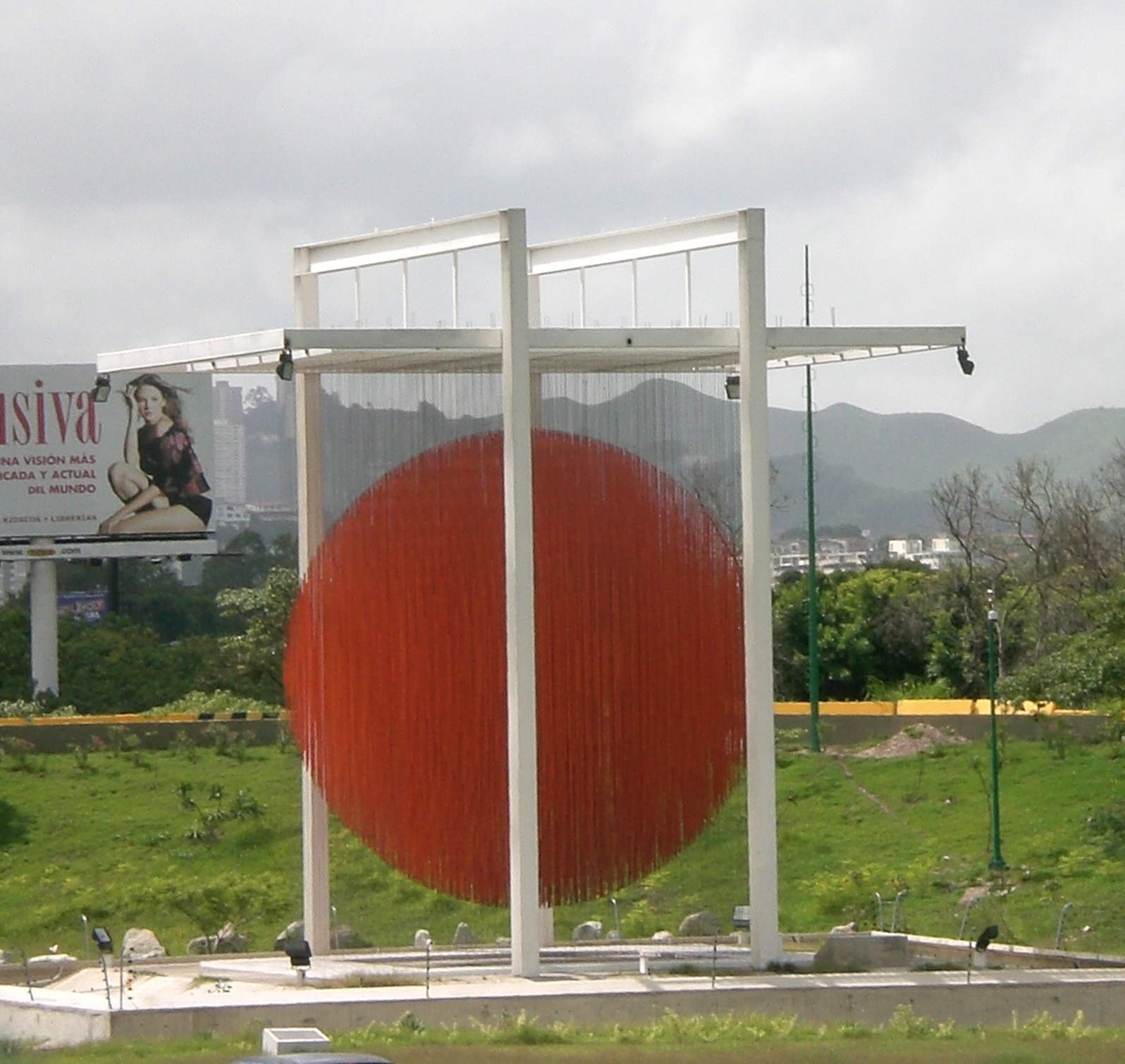
Jesús Rafael Soto, La Esfera, Caracas, Venezuela

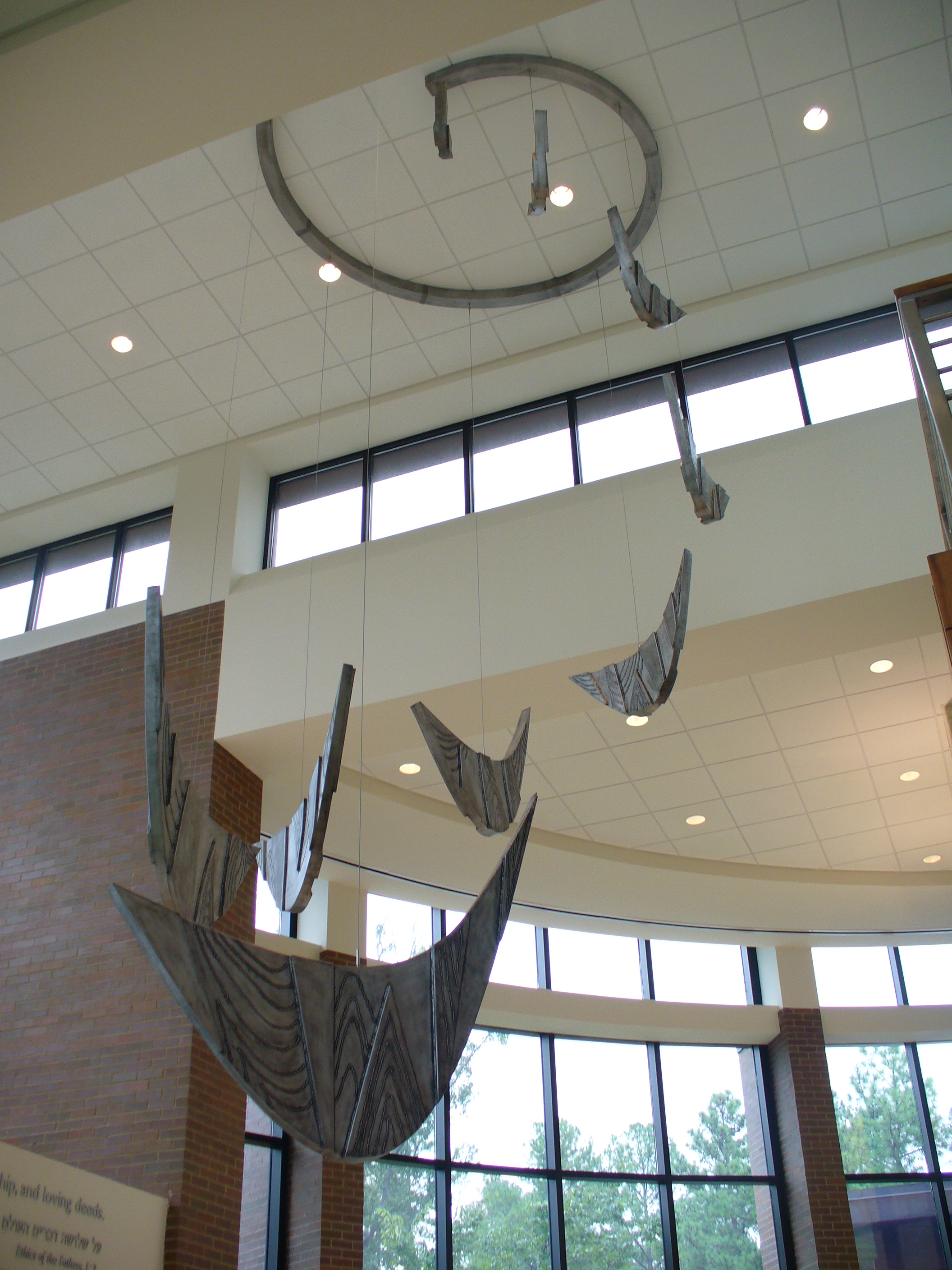
David Ascalon, Wings to the Heavens, 2008. Fabricated and brazed aluminum and stainless steel cable, Temple Israel, Memphis, Tennessee

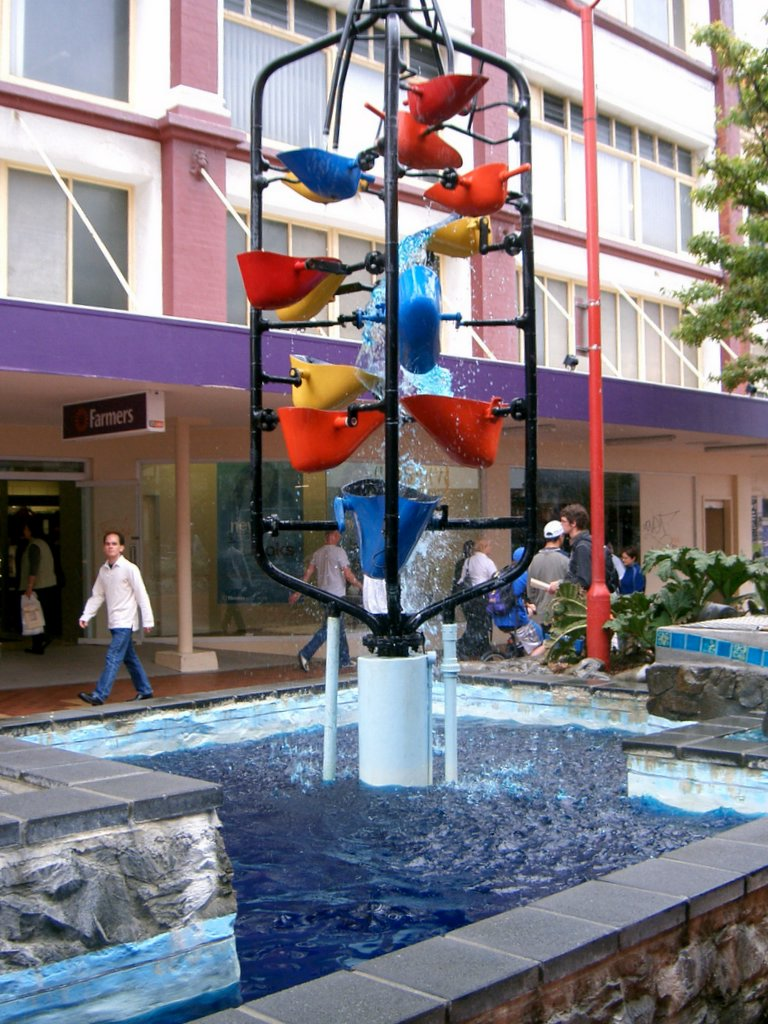
The Bucket Fountain, Wellington, NZ

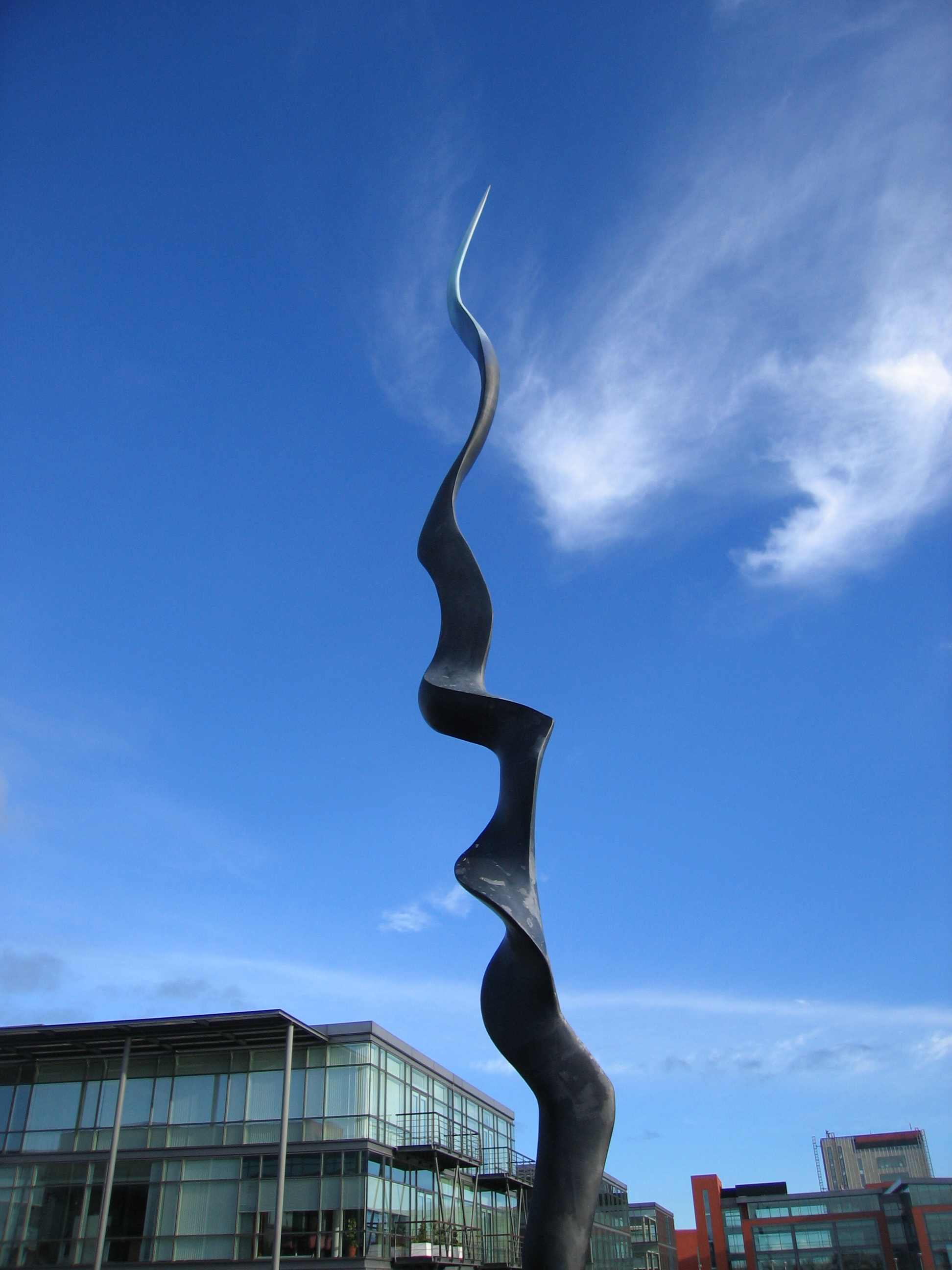
Wave, Park West, Angela Conner

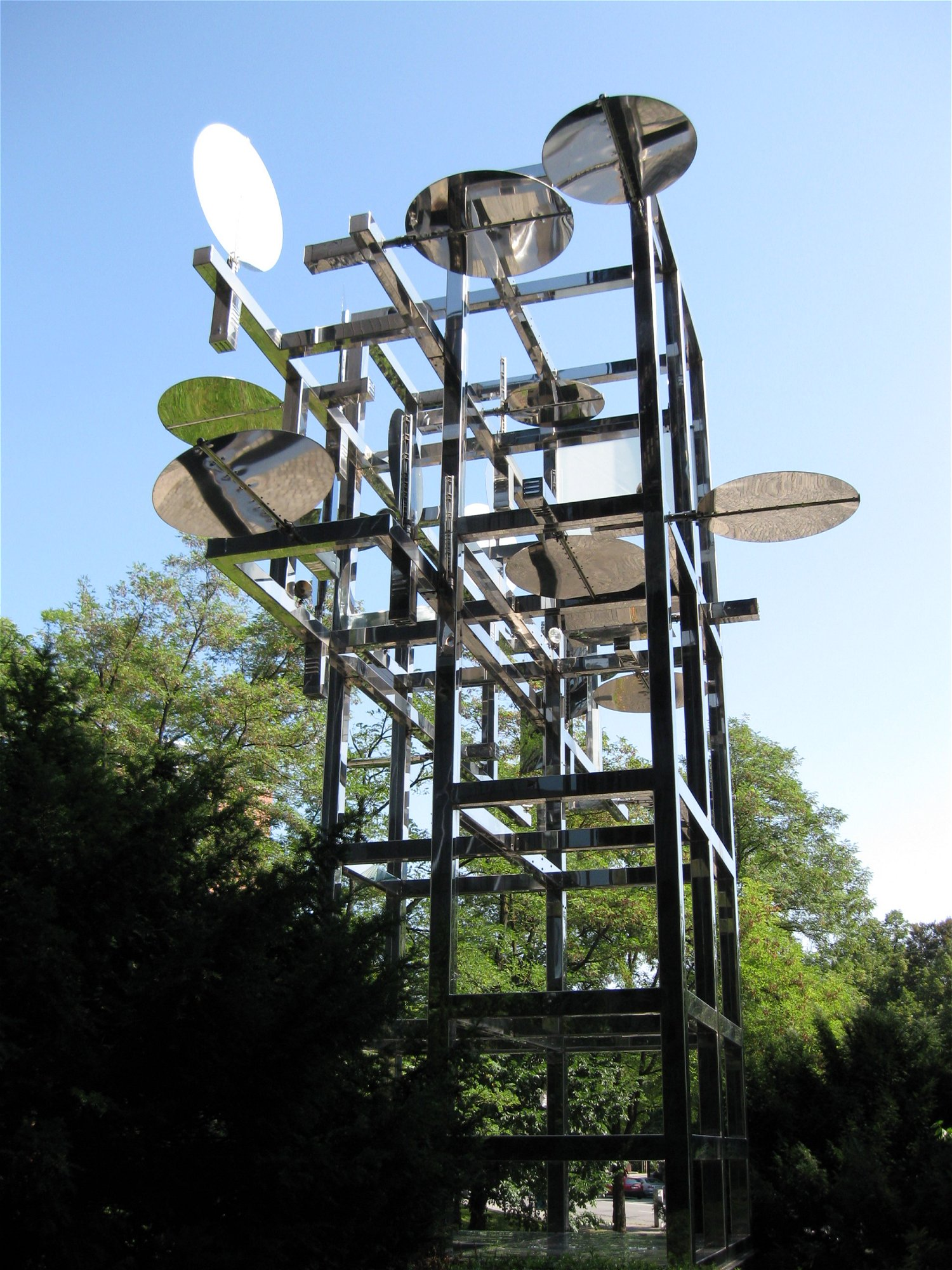
Nicolas Schoeffer Chronos 10B, 1980, Munich

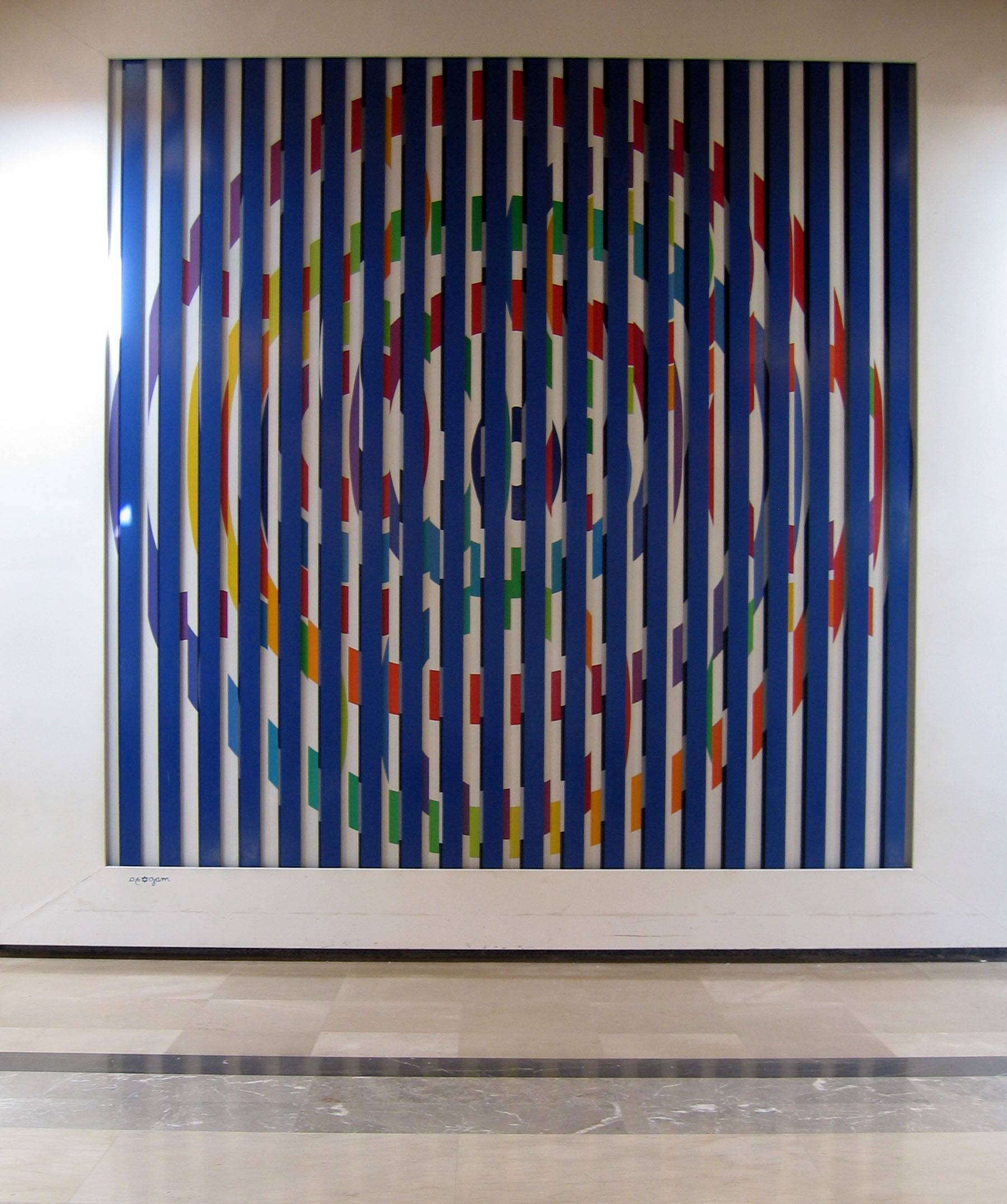
Yaacov Agam, Sheba Medical Center, Israel

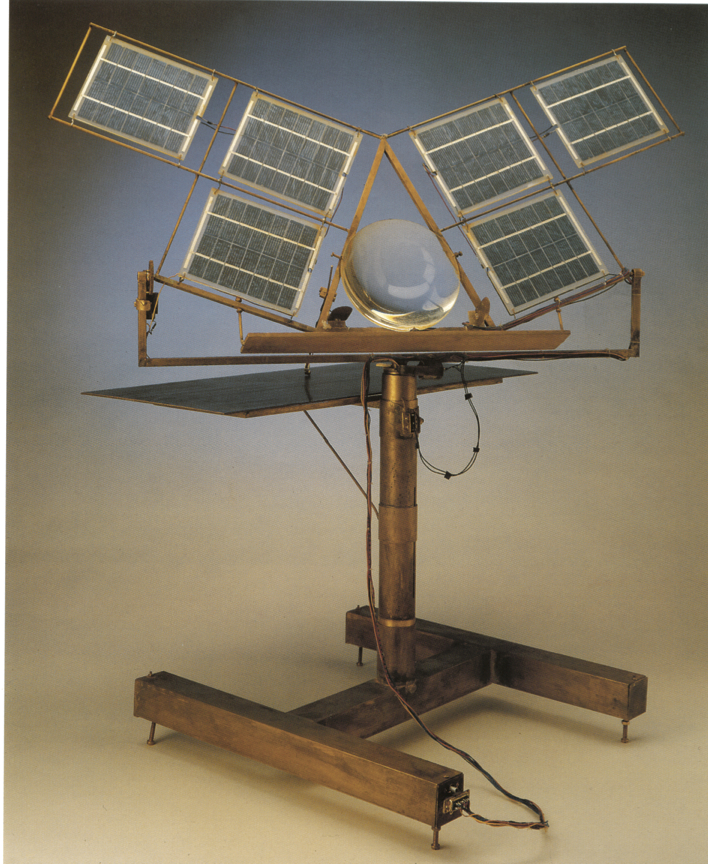
Marc van den Broek, Sun Writer, 1986, Germany

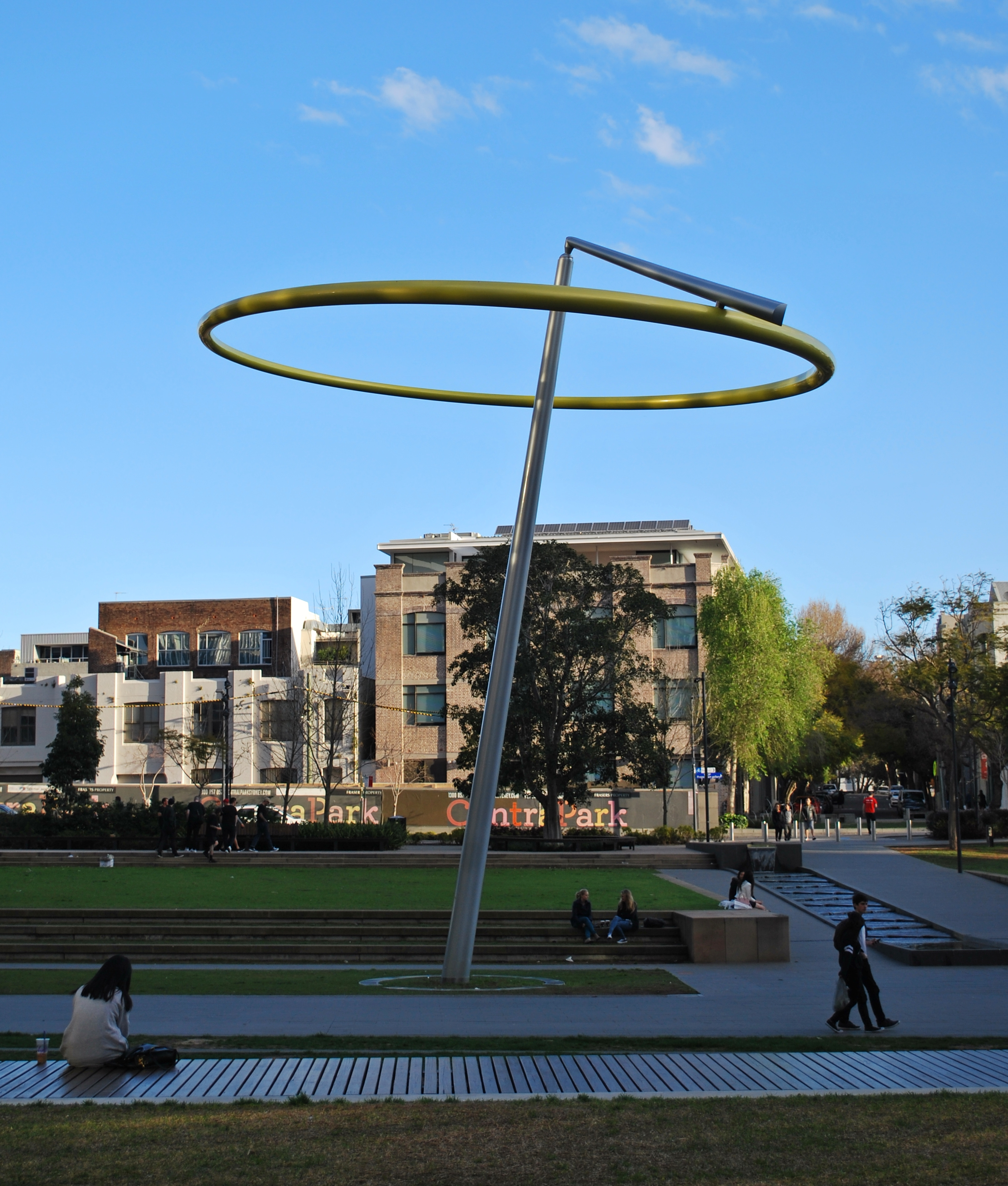
Turpin + Crawford Studio, Halo, Sydney, Australia

Uli Aschenborn, turning Sculpture-Morph its shadow shows the Male Life Cycle, Namibia

Uli Aschenborn, if the onlooker passes this ‘chameleon-painting’ Magic Dice it shows 1, 2 or 3 pips and its colour changes - sand and paint, Namibia

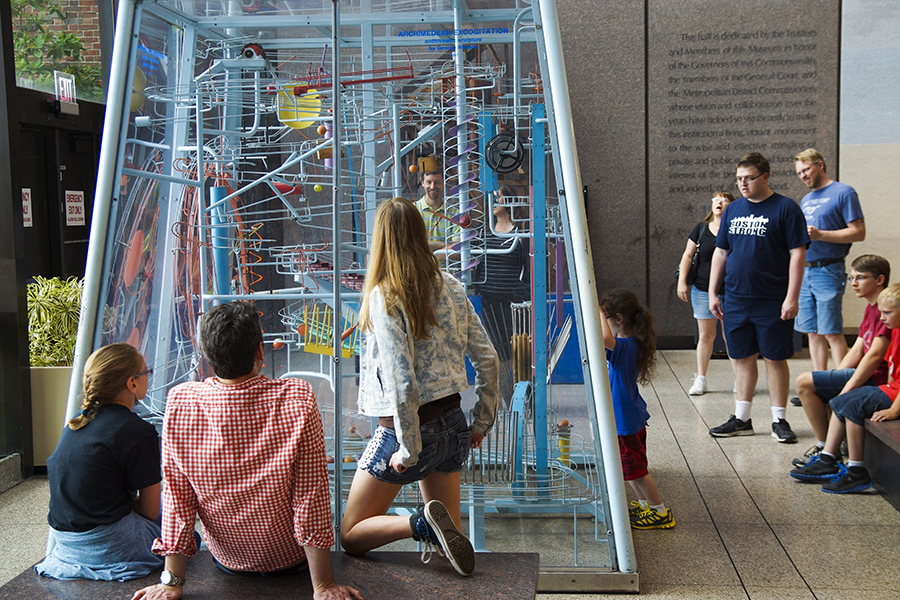
George Rhoads, Archimedean Excogitation (1987), a rolling ball sculpture, Museum of Science, Boston, United States

== Selected kinetic sculptors ==
- Yaacov Agam
- Uli Aschenborn
- David Ascalon
- Fletcher Benton
- Mark Bischof
- Daniel Buren
- Alexander Calder
- Gregorio Vardanega
- Martha Boto
- U-Ram Choe
- Angela Conner
- Carlos Cruz-Diez
- Marcel Duchamp
- Lin Emery
- Rowland Emett
- Ivana Franke
- Arthur Ganson
- Nemo Gould
- Gerhard von Graevenitz
- Bruce Gray
- Ralfonso Gschwend
- Rafael Lozano-Hemmer
- Chuck Hoberman
- Anthony Howe
- Irma Hünerfauth
- Tim Hunkin
- Theo Jansen
- Ned Kahn
- Roger Katan
- Starr Kempf
- Frederick Kiesler
- Viacheslav Koleichuk
- Gyula Kosice
- Paul Kuniholm
- Gilles Larrain
- Julio Le Parc
- Liliane Lijn
- Len Lye
- Sal Maccarone
- Heinz Mack
- Phyllis Mark
- László Moholy-Nagy
- Alejandro Otero
- Robert Perless
- Otto Piene
- George Rickey
- Ken Rinaldo
- Barton Rubenstein
- Nicolas Schöffer
- Eusebio Sempere
- Jesús Rafael Soto
- Mark di Suvero
- Takis
- Jean Tinguely
- Wen-Ying Tsai
- Marc van den Broek
- Willem van Weeghel
- Lyman Whitaker
- Ludwig Wilding

=== Selected kinetic op artists ===
- Nadir Afonso
- Getulio Alviani
- Marina Apollonio
- Carlos Cruz-Díez
- Milan Dobeš
- Ronald Mallory
- Youri Messen-Jaschin
- Vera Molnár
- Abraham Palatnik
- Bridget Riley
- Eusebio Sempere
- Grazia Varisco
- Victor Vasarely
- Jean-Pierre Yvaral
- Romano Rizzato

== See also ==
- Barrier-grid animation § Kinegram
- Gas sculpture
- Lumino kinetic art
- Odonien
- Robotic art
- Sound art
- Sound installation
