= Jean-Pierre Yvaral =

French painter

Jean-Pierre Vasarhelyi (Yvaral)
- Born: Jean-Pierre Vasarhelyi; 25 January 1934; Paris, France
- Died: 2 August 2002 (aged 68)
- Education: École des Arts Appliqués, Paris
- Known for: Painting
- Movement: Optical art
- Awards: Gold Medal: 5th San Marino Biennale (with GRAV) (1963). Gold Medal: New Delhi Triennale (1971). Gold Medal: Alexandria Triennale (1971)

Jean-Pierre Vasarely (1934–2002), professionally known as Yvaral, was a French artist working in the fields of op-art and kinetic art from 1954 onwards. He was the son of Victor Vasarely, who was a pioneer of op-art.

== Life and work ==
Yvaral studied graphic art and publicity at the École des Arts Appliqués in Paris between 1950 and 1953. In 1960, Yvaral co-founded the Groupe de Recherche d’Art Visual (GRAV) with Julio Le Parc, François Morellet, Francisco Sobrino, Horacio Garcia Rossi and Joel Stein, seeking to develop a coherent abstract visual language composed of simple geometric elements.

In 1975 he coined the phrase 'Numerical Art' to describe artwork composed (or programmed) according to numerical rules or algorithms. From this time onwards he used computers to digitally process and manipulate images, although the final images were always hand painted. He used this technique to produce several series of portraits starting from instantly recognisable images, such as the face of Marilyn Monroe, and processing them to the point where they become abstract compositions, while the original image remains recognisable.

== Death ==
He died on 2 August 2002, aged 68 and was survived by his widow, Michèle Taburno.
