= Prata di Pordenone =

Prata di Pordenone Prate (Friulian)
- Comune
- Comune di Prata di Pordenone
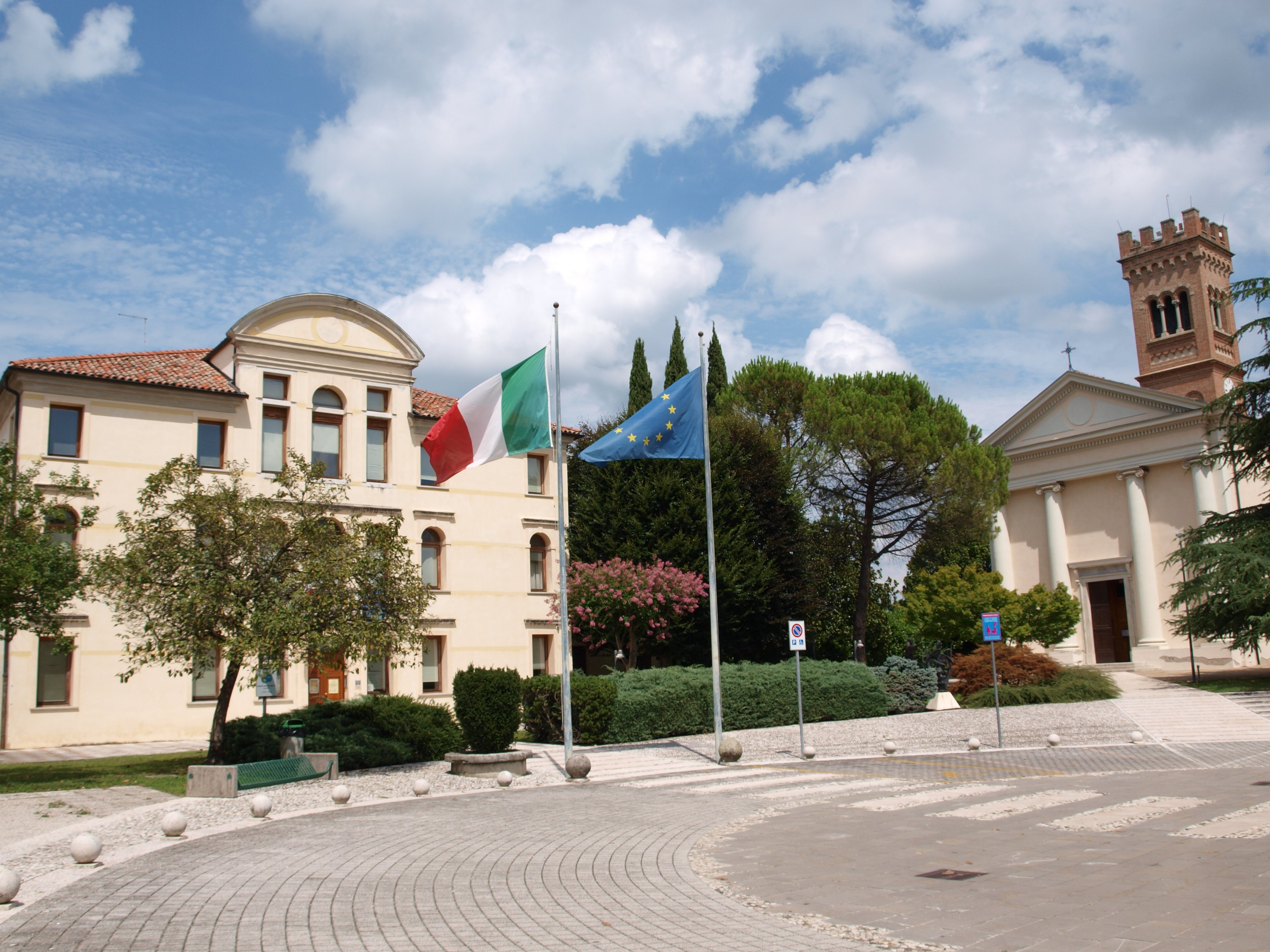
- The town hall and the church of Santa Lucia

- Coat of arms

- Location within Italy Location within Friuli-Venezia Giulia
- Coordinates: 45°54′N 12°36′E
- Country: Italy
- Region: Friuli-Venezia Giulia
- Province: Pordenone (PN)
- Frazioni: Ghirano, Prata di Sopra, Prata di Sotto (municipal seat), Puja, Villanova

Government
  - Mayor: Katia Cescon

Area
  - Total: 22.9 km^{2} (8.8 sq mi)
- Highest elevation: 50 m (160 ft)
- Lowest elevation: 17 m (56 ft)

Population (31 January 2026)
  - Total: 8,362
  - Density: 365/km^{2} (946/sq mi)
- Demonym: Pratensi
- Time zone: UTC+1 (CET)
  - Summer (DST): UTC+2 (CEST)
- Postal code: 33080
- Dialing code: 0434
- Website: Official website

Prata di Pordenone (Friulian: Prate) is a comune (municipality) in the Regional decentralization entity of Pordenone, in the Italian region of Friuli-Venezia Giulia, located about 100 kilometres (62 mi) northwest of Trieste and about 8 kilometres (5 mi) southwest of Pordenone.

Prata di Pordenone borders the following municipalities: Brugnera, Mansuè, Pasiano di Pordenone, Porcia, Pordenone, Portobuffolé.

The city is home to the headquarters of the furniture company Friul Intagli Industries S.p.A.

== Physical geography ==
The municipality of Prata di Pordenone is located in Friuli-Venezia Giulia, on the border with Veneto. It is made up of the main town, Prata di Pordenone and the hamlets of Villanova, Ghirano, Borgo Passo, Puja, Peressine, Prata di Sopra and Le Monde. It is part of the 16 municipalities of the catchment area of the Livenza river.

== Monuments and places of interest ==
=== Museo della Miniera (Mine Museum) ===
The Mine Museum is located in the center of Prata (in via Manin, next to the civic library) and illustrates the life of the Friulian emigrants who worked in the coal mines abroad, especially in Belgium, through the detailed reconstruction of a gallery, tools, photographs and documents. The exhibits on display are derived from the coal mine in the city of Roton. Returning to their homeland, deeply marked by silicosis, but also by the memory of many hardships and accidents, by the difficulties of integration and by the hostility of the environment, the former miners, pushed by Luigi Agnoletto, decided to carry out this work so that a difficult period of our history, marked by numerous tragedies, such as that of Marcinelle on 8 August 1956, is always present in the memory. The museum, dedicated to Saint Barbara (Santa Barbara), patron saint of miners, it is also a focal point where religious functions are also celebrated. In 2009 the former miners association, Gemp, donated the museum to the Municipality of Prata di Pordenone. The museum can be visited on request.

=== The parish church of Prata ===
The parish church of Prata, part of the diocese of Concordia-Pordenone, is a building built, or rather enlarged, in 1772, with a neoclassical facade marked by four semi-columns with Ionic capitals. Inside, in the high altar, two statues by the Venetian sculptor Bartolomeo Modolo, depicting the Saints Lucia and Giacomo (1748), an altarpiece with S. Carlo, S. Antonio Abate and S. Floriano (1630) by Gasparo Narvesa and an altarpiece (Madonna del Rosario between S. Domenico and S. Rosa) by Jacopo Amigoni (1682-1752). The latter was a Neapolitan painter who, having come young in Venice, was among the protagonists of Rococò with Sebastiano Ricci and Gian Domenico Pellegrini: in this 1740 painting, the wide and open phrasing is highlighted, together with the indeterminacy of the contours and the fluffiness of the color.

=== The parish church of Ghirano ===
The parish church of Ghirano, dedicated to Saints Peter and Paul and included in the diocese of Vittorio Veneto, was built between 1797 and 1846.

=== Ancient Temple of S. Giovanni dei Cavalieri ===
Important historical construction, the ancient Temple of S. Giovanni dei Cavalieri, dating back to the fourteenth century, contains precious evidence of Gothic sculpture in Friuli, such as the fourteenth-century tomb seals with the representation of the presbyters Giacomo da Prata (1330) and Bonaccorso ( 1337), the ark of Pileo da Prata (1325) and above all those of Nicolò da Prata and Caterina di Castrucco (1344), enriched by the bas-relief figures of the Madonna and Child and the Saints Francesco and Giovanni Battista, and considered the work of a collaborator of the Venetian sculptor Andriolo de Santi.

=== Church of Saints Simon and Judas ===
The Church of Saints Simon and Judas, mentioned in the testament of Guecello II di Prata on 7 August 1262, preserves in the apse the memory of the Renaissance decoration: frescoes with the Doctors of the Church in the sails of the vaults and a Crucifixion on the back wall, and then the Sacrifice of Cain and Abel and the Annunciation in the triumphal arch and Saints in the under arch attributable to the painter Pietro Gorizio and datable to 1498. Still in Prata, in a road capital in front of Palazzo Brunetta, a Madonna with Child painted by Gianfrancesco da Tolmezzo around 1500.

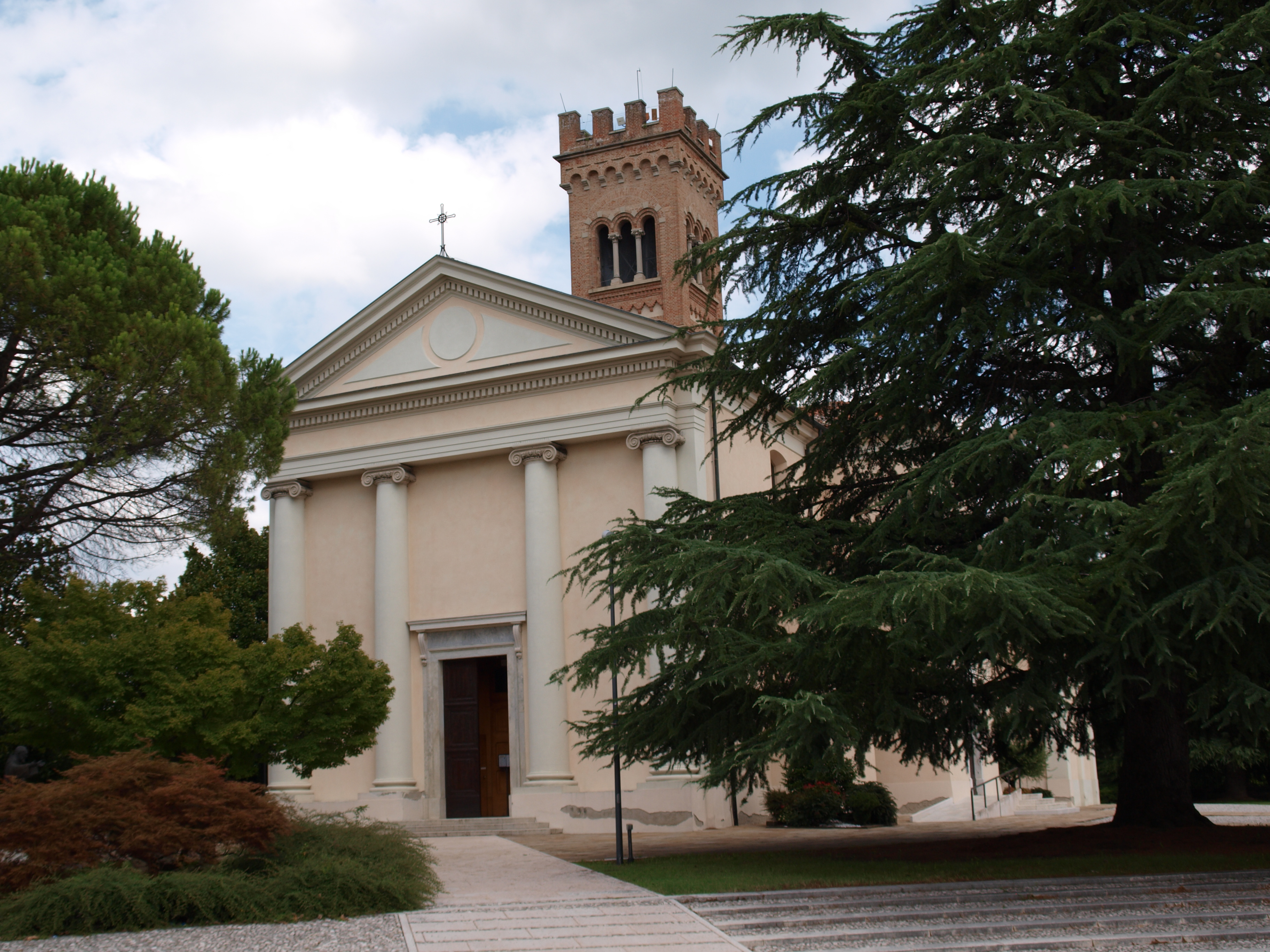
The parish church

=== Villa Morosini Memmo ===
The Villa Morosini Memmo, now the Town Hall, dates back to the end of the sixteenth century.

=== Villa Brunetta ===
Villa Brunetta is characterised by the height of the central part, statues in the garden and indoor eighteenth-century fireplaces and frescoes.

=== Brunetta capitello ===
Nearby the Church of Saints Simon and Judas, it is still possible to see a valuable pictorial work: a fresco depicting the Madonna on the throne holding the Child with her right arm, standing on her knees, holding an apple with left hand.

The fresco, in a precarious state of conservation, is the work of Gianfrancesco da Tolmezzo and is dated to 1499.

The capitello, similar to a wayside shrine, is what remains of the small apse of a larger oratory, which, according to some oral sources, had a gabled facade surmounted by a single-hole bell tower. The oratory was demolished around 1940 to allow for the widening of the road at the intersection. For popular devotion the fresco was saved. The original building belonged to the Brunetta family.

In 2017 the Brunetta capitello was returned to the community after a restoration.

== Sports ==
=== Men's Volleyball ===
In the 2025-2026 season, Volley Prata participated in the Serie A2 championship and after several years was promoted to the Serie A1 of Italian men's volleyball.

== Twin towns and sister cities ==
Prata di Pordenone is twinned with:

- Floreffe, Belgium

== People ==
- Ben Ormenese (1930–2013), Italian kinetic artist
- Giorgia Moll (1938), Italian actress
