= Robert Perless =

American artist

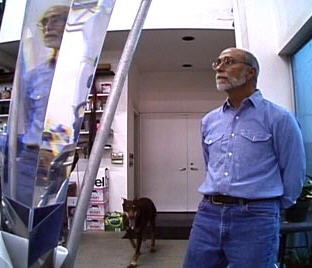
- Robert Perless in his studio
- Born: 1938; Brooklyn, New York
- Died: September 8, 2023; Greenwich, Connecticut
- Known for: Kinetic Art
- Notable work: Dream Weaver 2008, Sun Dagger 2004, Orion's Belt 2002,
- Movement: Kinetic Art

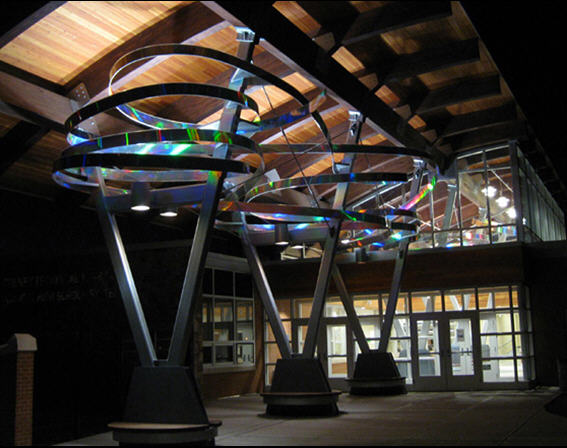
Dream Weaver (2008). 20’ high; welded aluminum, holographic material. Howell Cheney Technical High School, Manchester, Connecticut.

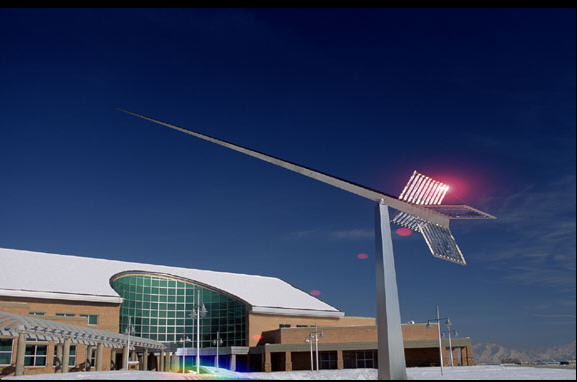
Solar Wind (2000). 28’ high; stainless steel and polymer prisms. Wind and light interactive. Utah Arts Council, Salt Lake Community College.

Robert Perless was an American artist whose particular focus is kinetic art sculptures.

== Personal background ==
Perless was born in Brooklyn, New York, in 1938. He studied Art and Engineering at the University of Miami in Florida. In 1978 after working in cramped quarters in New York City, Perless determined to build an all-metal house and studio in Greenwich, Connecticut. He contracted architect John Ciardullo who designed a house and studio framed in steel, with aluminum exterior paneling, which Perless built himself, welding and erecting the structure and sculptural railings and cutting and hanging the exterior Alucobond panels. The large sculpture studio with 25 foot high ceilings is part of the main structure.

== Kinetic Art ==
Perless was part of the Kinetic Art movement. He has created kinetic structures as public artworks for municipalities, post-secondary educational institutions as well as private sector commissioned art installations for various corporations. His works were discussed at the first International Kinetic Art Symposium February 9, 2013 in the presentation on the link between Kinetic Art and the generation of Electricity from the wind; They were also discussed during the Breaking The Barriers panel discussion and detailed in the presentation following the panel discussion on how his 40 years of Kinetic Art works, lead to the development of small wind turbines for use in urban environments.

== Body of work ==
The works were created in his large Greenwich studio adjacent to his home, using industrial materials. His works were inspired by early 20th-century modern sculptors, including the Russian Constructivists, the Italian Futurists, and European and American masters who used new materials and the concept of motion and speed in art and life.

=== Selected sculptures ===
Orion's Belt, Corpus Christi, Texas.

Sun Dagger (2004), on the campus of Utah Valley University, Wasatch in Heber City, Utah.

Solar Wind, on the High Tech Campus of Salt Lake Community College.

=== Selected collections ===
His works have been acquired by museums and public galleries including:

- Aldrich Museum of Contemporary Art, Ridgefield, Connecticut
- Boca Raton Museum of Art, Boca Raton, Florida
- Oklahoma Art Center, University of Oklahoma,
- Phoenix Art Museum, Phoenix, Arizona
- Stamford Museum & Nature Center, Stamford, Connecticut
- Whitney Museum of American Art, New York City
- William Benton Museum of Art, Storrs, Connecticut

=== Selected exhibitions ===
Perless's work has been exhibited in solo and group shows, including:

- 2012 Sculptors Guild, Saks Fifth Avenue, New York, NY
- 2008 In-Site Governor’s Island, NY
- 2006 Robert Perless: Public Visions One-Man Show, Flinn Gallery, Greenwich, CT
- 2006 Sculpture in the Park, White Plains, NY
- 2004 Art Omi International Arts Center, Omi, New York
- 2003 Sculpture Now, Stockbridge, MS
- 2001 Space 2001, Bruce Museum, Greenwich, CT
- 2000 12X12X12, Greenwich Art Society
- 1997‘94‘87‘78 Aldrich Museum of Contemporary Art, Ridgefield, CT
- 1995 Environmental Sculptures, Kukje Gallery, Seoul, Korea.
- 1991 - 96 Andre Emmerich’s Top Gallant Farm Sculpture Garden, Quaker Hill, NY
- 1991 ‘92 Paris-New York-Kent Gallery, Kent, CT
- 1989 Connecticut Biennial Bruce Museum, Greenwich, CT
- 1980 Taft Museum, Cincinnati, Ohio
- 1976 Bonino Gallery, One-Man Show, New York, NY
- 1975 Forum Gallery, New York, NY
- 1972 Bernard Danenberg Gallery, One-Man Show, New York, NY
- 1970 Light, Motion, & Sound, Hudson River Museum, Yonkers, NY
- 1970 Eclectra ‘70 Pepsico, New York, NY
- 1970 Whitney Museum, New York, NY
- 1969 Galerie Simonne Stern, One-Man Show, New Orleans, LA
- 1968 Bodley Gallery, One-Man Show, New York, NY

== External images ==
- Sculptors Guild Images of Perless' work
- Works: Rainbow Monad, 2006; Molecular Exploration, 2002; Molecule, 2002
- Public Sculptures, 2009 Video 9 min. 30 sec. on YouTube
- Photos of Perless kinetic sculptures
