= Friul Intagli Industries S.p.A. =

- Type: privately held
- Industry: manufacturing
- Founded: 1968
- Headquarters: Prata di Pordenone, Pordenone, Italy
- Products: furniture
- Revenue: USD 1.2 billion (2023)
- Number of employees: 2500 (2018)
- Parent: Maccan Group

Friul Intagli Industries S.p.A. is an Italian multinational company founded in 1968 by Inaco Maccan.

It is a part of the Maccan Group. Friul Intagli Industries, is the largest furniture component manufacturer in the World, supplying Europe as well as the US, such as IKEA, their main client. Their markets include kitchens, bathrooms, bedrooms, home office, children's furniture and entertainment furniture for residential and commercial buildings as well as cruises and ships. It is headquartered in Prata di Pordenone with other work sites in the biggest capitals of Europe, America and Russia.

== History ==
Inaco Maccan R, Knight of the Order of St. Gregory the Great, founded Friul Intagli in 1968 at the age of 20 years. He wanted to create his own productive activity, differently from the market of those times, providing furniture components rather than finished products. In 1979 was founded the second company of the Group, ERREGIEMME SpA, for the production of veneer frames, later incorporated into the Friul Intagli.

Friul Intagli provides furnitures and services to hotels, cruises, residential and community spaces.

Today the covered surface area of Friul Intagli occupies 3.000.000 sq feet, with over 2.500 employees and an annual revenue over US$950 million.

== See also ==
- List of Italian companies
