= Gregorio Vardanega =

Italian artist (1923–2007)

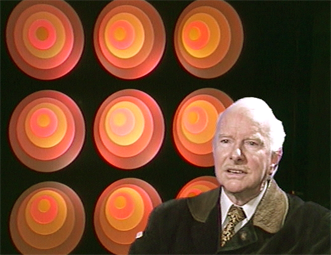
- Gregorio Vardanega in 1995
- Born: 21 March 1923; Possagno, Italy
- Died: 7 October 2007 (aged 84); Paris, France
- Occupation: Artist
- Known for: Chromocinetism

Gregorio Vardanega (21 March 1923 – 7 October 2007) was an artist of Italian origins who worked in Argentina and France. Vardanega and Martha Boto, his companion, created the term "chromocinetism" to describe their artistic research.

== Early life ==
Vardanega was born in Possagno, Italy.

Vardanega's family migrated to Argentina when he was three years old. He attended the Escuela Nacional de Bellas Artes in Buenos Aires from 1939 to 1946.

== Career ==
Vardanega at a young age showed enthusiasm for space, questioned its form and its elements, what this achieves in the world.

Gregorio Vardanega inquired in the direction of light, in relation to color, movement and space, adding electronics in his artistic work

He used electric and transparent colors, color spaces, diffraction and light transmission in solid liquids and gases.

Vardanega was a member of Nouvelle Tendance together with Luis Tomasello, Enrico Castellani, Enzo Mari among others, who had as an end in common the exchange and develop projects.

In 1946 Vardanega began working in acrylic glass, and also produced structures using overlapping wires. In the same year, when he was studying at the National Academy of Fine Arts, he participated in exhibitions in 1946 where he made overlapping glass or plexiglass plates.

In 1948 he traveled to Europe in the company of Carmelo Arden Quin. After exhibiting in the Amerique Latine lounge, she is related to Michael Seuphot, Georges Vantongerloo, Max Bill and others.

Through the 1950s he experimented with kinetic art, constructing artworks moving and rotating at irregular intervals, which produced abstract patterns through lighting, reflections and shadows. He also made his first luminous sculpture as a result of trying to embody the physical and psychic universe mind.

In 1955, is one of the founders of an art association and a few years after the ANFA group.

His first kinetic piece using an electric motor was exhibited in the gallery of the Estimulo de Bellas Artes in October 1957.

In 1959 Vardanega moved to Paris, where he met the Argentinian artist Martha Boto. They maintained contact with artists in Buenos Aires, including Eduardo Jonquières and his group "Arte Nuevo", and the artists' group MADI.

1960 does a work with Plexiglas again, which has small spheres inside that are illuminated by projections of lights. Vardanega explored the field of the discovery of the electro technique of environmental situations using different forms of artistic expression, I believe electronic oscillators in some of his works.

Between 1960 and 1968 he was also a member of the GRAV group (Groupe de Recherche d'Art Visuel).

He was represented by Galerie Denise René. Vardanega had his first solo exhibition in Paris in 1964, which established him as an important practitioner of kinetic art.

== Honors ==
He won gold medals at the Exposition of Visual Art in Argentina and at the International and Universal Exposition in Brussels in 1958.

== Art works ==
Couleurs Sonores, 1963-1979 It is artistic work that for a city planning metropolis of skyscrapers, this was exposed in 2013 but due to its great height could not be exhibited in the place.

Cosmic Dream which is a plexiglass composition, uses the electric color that is based on the analysis of its major sensory mark and its aesthetic fruit, has reliefs with concentrated tajaduras.

Electronic relief is composed of a white wood, with 10 cylindrical lamps, these together with the support called the geometric figures, square and circle, and represent their stage where he worked the repetition of these elements to achieve optical effects.

Electronic Universe 1958 allowed the viewer to interact directly to modify the work through the evolution of colors.

== Personal life ==
Vardanega lived in France from 1959 till his death in Paris in 2007.
