= Lyman Whitaker =

American sculptor

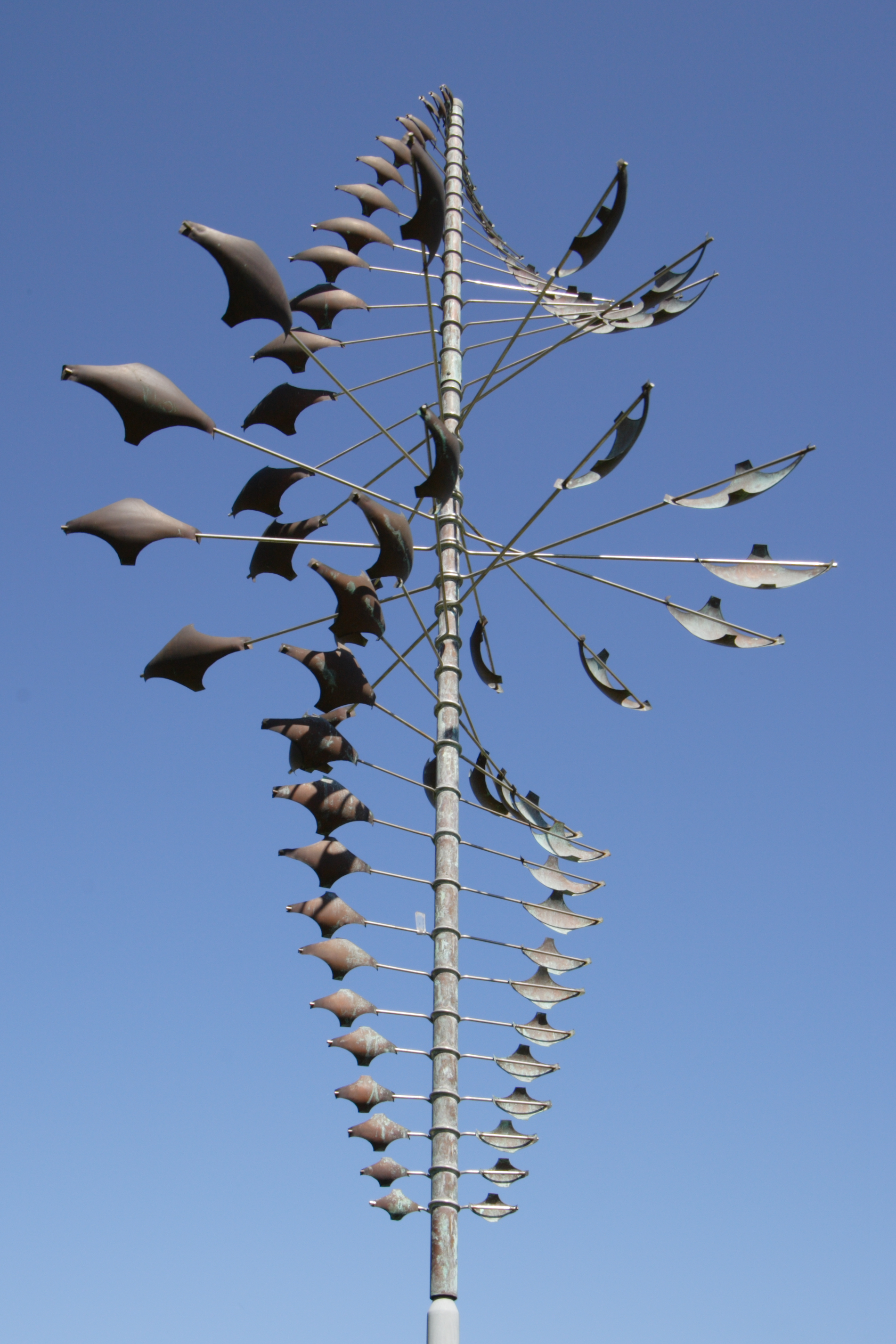
"The Twister Star Huge", a type of Whirligig.

Lyman Whitaker is an American sculptor working in southern Utah. Whitaker has been a working sculptor for more than 50 years and is known for his kinetic sculptures.

== Early work ==
Whitaker's early work consisted of largely representational sculpture, varying from traditional bronzes, small mobiles, and public fountains.

== Recent work ==
During the past 40 years he has primarily focused upon creating "wind sculptures" which are handmade kinetic art that responds to the changing currents of the wind. His compositions vary from single, 5 foot (1.5 m) tall pieces to "Wind Forests" consisting of groups of sculptures standing up to 35 foot (11 m) tall.

Whitaker's work is represented at art galleries and in private collections throughout the United States and abroad, as well as in museums and public spaces.
