= Marc van den Broek =

Belgian artist and sculptor

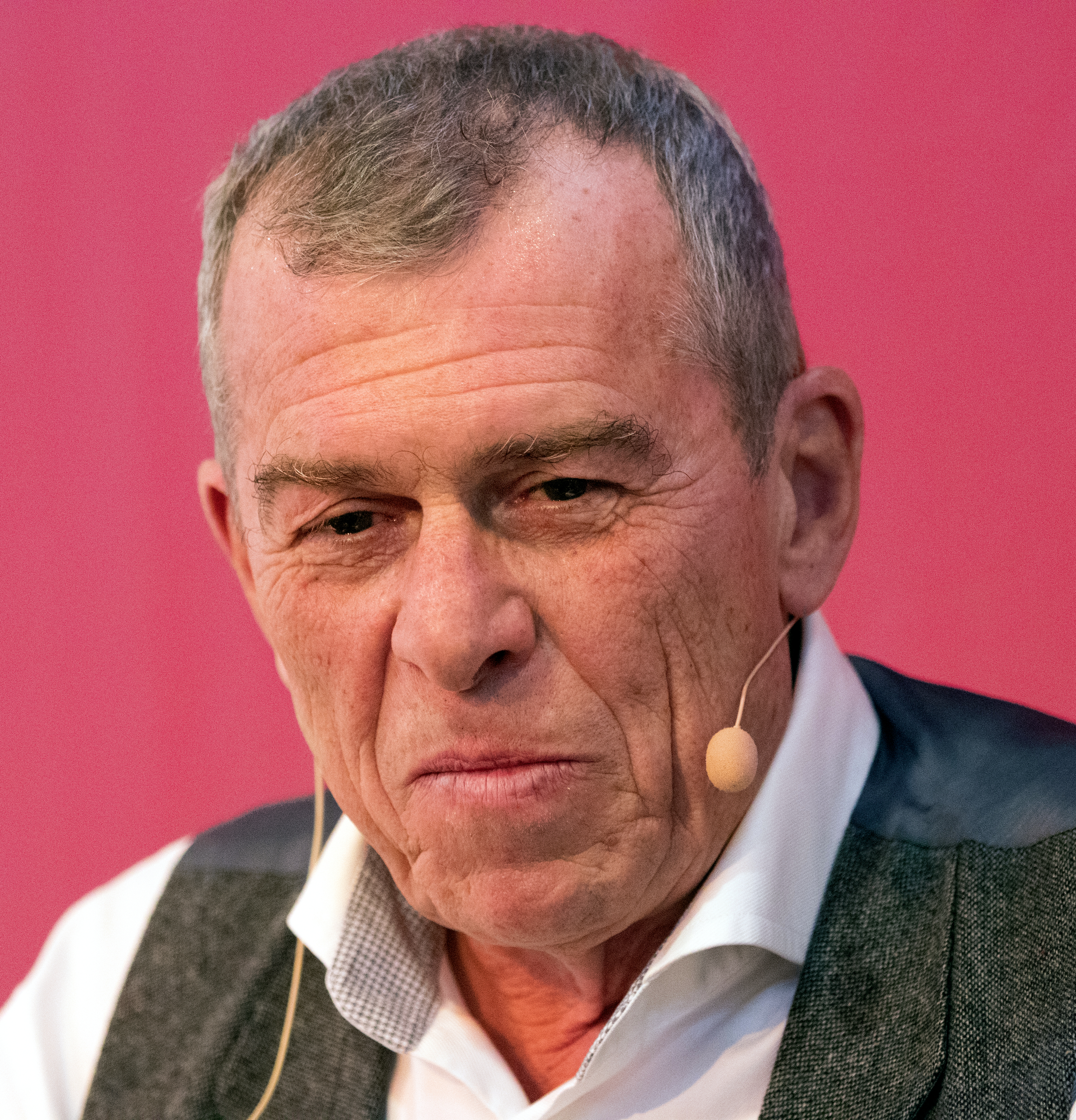
Marc van den Broek at Frankfurt Book Fair 2018

Marc Jozef Magareta van den Broek (born 1953 in Antwerp, Belgium) is a Belgian artist and sculptor.

== Life ==
Marc van den Broek was born on February 2, 1953, in Mortsel-Antwerp. From 1963 to 1965 and from 1970 to 1971 he studied at the Akademie voor Schone Kunsten in Bechem-Antwerp. During the years 1965–70, he attended the Technical School voor Electro-Mechanic in Antwerp, followed by studies at the Institut voor Kunstambachten in Antwerp from 1972 to 1975. Marc van den Broek is a founding member of the "Hinterhaus" cultural center established in Wiesbaden, Germany in 1978. He co-founded the Art Research Laboratories in 1990.

== Art ==
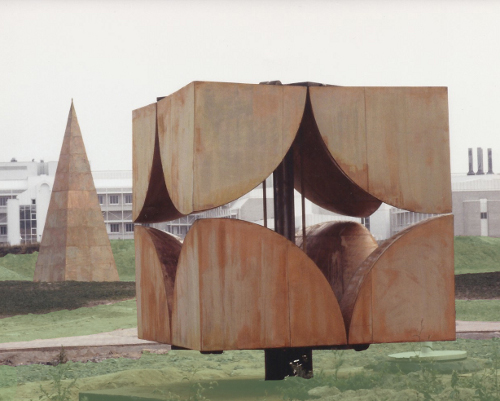
A.TE.M. Langen

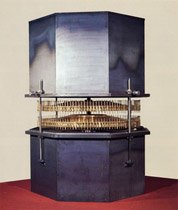
Die Unabhängigkeitserklärung

In the early 1980s, Marc van den Broek focused largely on spatial installations based on a symbiosis of art and technology: the flying objects known as mutants. In 1984, he began developing works of kinetic art, culminating in the Archaic-Technological-Metamorphosis (A.TE.M.) in 1987–1989. A.TE.M. is the manifest expression of Marc van den Broek's overall intellectual and spiritual concept: The archaic is represented by the basic forms (sphere, cube and pyramid); the technological aspect is the principle underlying the construction of the objects, and metamorphosis is realized in the movements of the objects.

The Declaration of Independence (Die Unabhängigkeitserklärung) was realized between 1990 and 1992 as a kinetic sculpture which marks the end of the era of materialism in the waning years of the industrial age.

Inspired by intensive, long-term cooperation with leading industrial and commercial firms, Marc van den Broek developed the project entitled "The Impact of Art in Business." In this work he takes up Joseph Beuys's concept of "Social Sculpture" and concludes that the symbiosis of art and entrepreneurship is a synergetic process of creation which contributes to the spiritual development of society through innovation and revelation. Marc van den Broek continued to pursue this approach during his years in New York (1998–2008), where he worked with numerous well-known companies.

The artist is also concerned with changing perceptions of reality under the influence of the Internet and the question of how this process can be visualized in art. His work in this area includes a series of large-scale paintings grouped under the heading of Angels and other Ambassadors. In spring 2010 Marc van den Broek launched an art installation referring to Social Sculptures: The Garden of Nomads, a modular ensemble that can be installed in any setting and thus impacts on the urban organism in variety of ways.

Since more than 35 years Marc van den Broek has been working on the artwork and technical illustrations of Leonardo da Vinci. This leads him in 2018 to the publication of his artistic book Leonardo da Vincis Spirits of Inventions, where the sources and origins of da Vincis inventions has been researched and documented. In 2019 the english edition Leonardo da Vinci Spirits of Inventions - A Search for Traces has been published.

== Exhibitions ==
- 1974: Gallery Den Bellaert, Antwerp/Belgium
- 1976: Salon International Jeune Peinture, Versailles/France
- 1977: Belgian House (Consulat), Cologne/Germany
- 1977: International Drawing Biennale, Cleveland/Great Britain
- 1977: University Museum, Marburg/Germany
- 1977: Gallery Christa Moehring, Wiesbaden/Germany
- 1977: Kulturamt Wetzlar, Avemann'sches House, Wetzlar/Germany
- 1979: Kunstkamer Manebrugge, Antwerp/Belgium
- 1980: Internationale Jugendtriennale und Meister der Zeichnung, Nürnberg/Germany
- 1982: University of Arts, Berlin/Germany
- 1983: Kunsthalle-Studio, Darmstadt/Germany
- 1983: Brückenturm-Gallery, Mainz/Germany
- 1984: BMW-Gallery, Munic/Germany
- 1984: BMW-Gallery, Berlin/Germany
- 1985: Art Gallery Artists from Hesse, Darmstadt/Germany
- 1985: AREA, New York/USA
- 1985: Hessian Days of Culture in Armenia/USSR-Erevan
- 1985: Gallery CA, Düsseldorf/Germany
- 1986: Museum, San Sebastian/Spain
- 1986: Mathildenhöhe "Symmetrie", Darmstadt/Germany
- 1986: Neue Darmstädter Sezession, Darmstadt/Germany
- 1987: Town Hall Tempelhof "The Dream of Flying", Berlin/Germany
- 1987: Trade Fair "Energy and Environment", Saarbrücken/Germany
- 1987: Federal state Hesse "Angels and other Heavenly Beings", Bonn, Bad Soden, Hanover/Germany
- 1989: Airport, Frankfurt/Germany
- 1992: Museum, Bad Hersfeld/Germany
- 1992: Brückenturm-Gallery, Mainz/Germany
- 1994: The New Adam, Berlin, Kassel/Germany
- 1994: Town Hall at the Dome, Wetzlar/Germany
- 1997: IHK Würzburg-Schweinfurt, Würzburg/Germany
- 2000: Iron Cast Gallery, New York/USA
- 2003: N6 Gallery, Brooklyn, New York/USA
- 2006: ZDF Studio Exhibition, Brüssel/Belgien
- 2011: Schaalsee Gallery, Dargow/Germany
- 2013: A.TE.M. Werkstätten, Hamburg/Germany
- 2015: Kulturschiff MS Stubnitz, Museum Ship Cap San Diego, Hamburg/Germany
- 2016: A.TE.M. Gallery, Hamburg/Germany
- 2019: Kunstarche, Wiesbaden/Germany

== Art in public ==
- 1987: Entrance Hall Louise-Schröder-School, Wiesbaden/Germany
- 1988: Design Prehistoric Museum, Dotternhausen/Germany
- 1988: Foyer design Telecommunication Centre, Wiesbaden/Germany
- 1988: "A.TE.M.", Outdoor area design, training center of Bundesanstalt für Flugsicherung, Langen/Frankfurt a. Main/Germany [1]
- 1989: Foyer design, M.C.S. Company, Eltville/Germany
- 1990: Foyer design, Ploenzke Company, Wiesbaden/Germany
- 1990: "ATEMSTERN", Open air sculpture, Kreditanstalt für Wiederaufbau, Frankfurt a.Main/Germany
- 1990: "Implantat", art project for the German Electron Synchrotron (DESY), Hamburg, Frankfurt a. Main/Germany
- 1990: Design of the Municipal Conference Room, City Hall of the State Capital, Wiesbaden/Germany
- 1993: Foyer design Procedo Company, Wiesbaden/Germany
- 1994: Holocaust Memorial, Wiesbaden-Nordenstadt/Germany
- 1995: Design Crédit Suisse, Messeturm, Frankfurt/Germany
- 1995: Design Flying Object, Airport Zürich/Switzerland

== Collections ==
Marc van den Broek's work is held in the following collections:
City of Mainz, City of Wiesbaden, City of Wetzlar, Kreditanstalt für Wiederaufbau KfW, Frankfurt, Credit Suisse and Zurich Airport

== Awards ==
- 1994–1995 German Corporate Design Award
- 2001 Exhibit Design Award Monsanto
- 2001 Exhibit Design Award AVAYA (AT&T)
- 2004 Industrial Designer Society of America Excellence Awards-Silver; IDEA for the Botanical Garden Cleveland
- 2017 Remi Winner, 50th Worldfest Houston, International Film Festival, Houston/Texas
- 2017 Winner, Best Experimental Shortfilm, Short to the Point, Film Festival Bukarest/Rumänien
- 2017 Winner, Liverpool Independent Film Festival, Liverpool/UK
- 2018 Winner/Gold Award, International Independent Film Awards, Encino, Los Angeles/US

== Literature ==
- Der Traum vom Fliegen, Rathaus Tempelhof, Berlin/Germany ISBN 3-88520-223-9
- Symmetrie in Kunst, Natur und Wissenschaft, Ausstellungskatalog Mathildenhöhe Darmstadt/Germany, August 1986
- Marc van den Broek: Brush Tracks, 1994–1995, Wiesbaden, author´s edition
- Marc van den Broek: gezeichnet gedacht gelebt, 2013, Hamburg, author´s edition
- Leonardo da Vincis Erfindungsgeister, 2018, Mainz/Germany ISBN 978-3-961760-45-9
- Leonardo da Vinci Spirits of Invention - A Search for Traces, 2019, Hamburg ISBN 978-3-00-063700-1
