= Mark Bischof =

Dutch artist

Mark Bischof (born 1958, Duisburg) is a Dutch artist specializing in kinetic installations. His works have been featured in the Ambient Art Gallery in Amsterdam, the film Kinetic, and in the motion picture Fracture. Among his most impressive creations is Markrokosmos, a complex kinetic glass marble machine measuring 300x300x250cm.
