= Julio Le Parc =

Argentine artist (1928–2026)

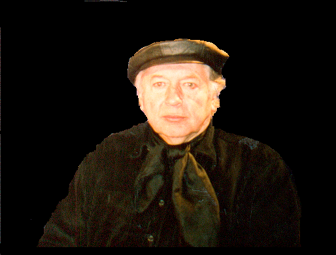
- Born: 23 September 1928; Palmira, Mendoza province, Argentina
- Died: 30 May 2026 (aged 97); Paris, France
- Education: School of Fine Arts
- Movement: Groupe de Recherche d'Art Visuel (GRAV)

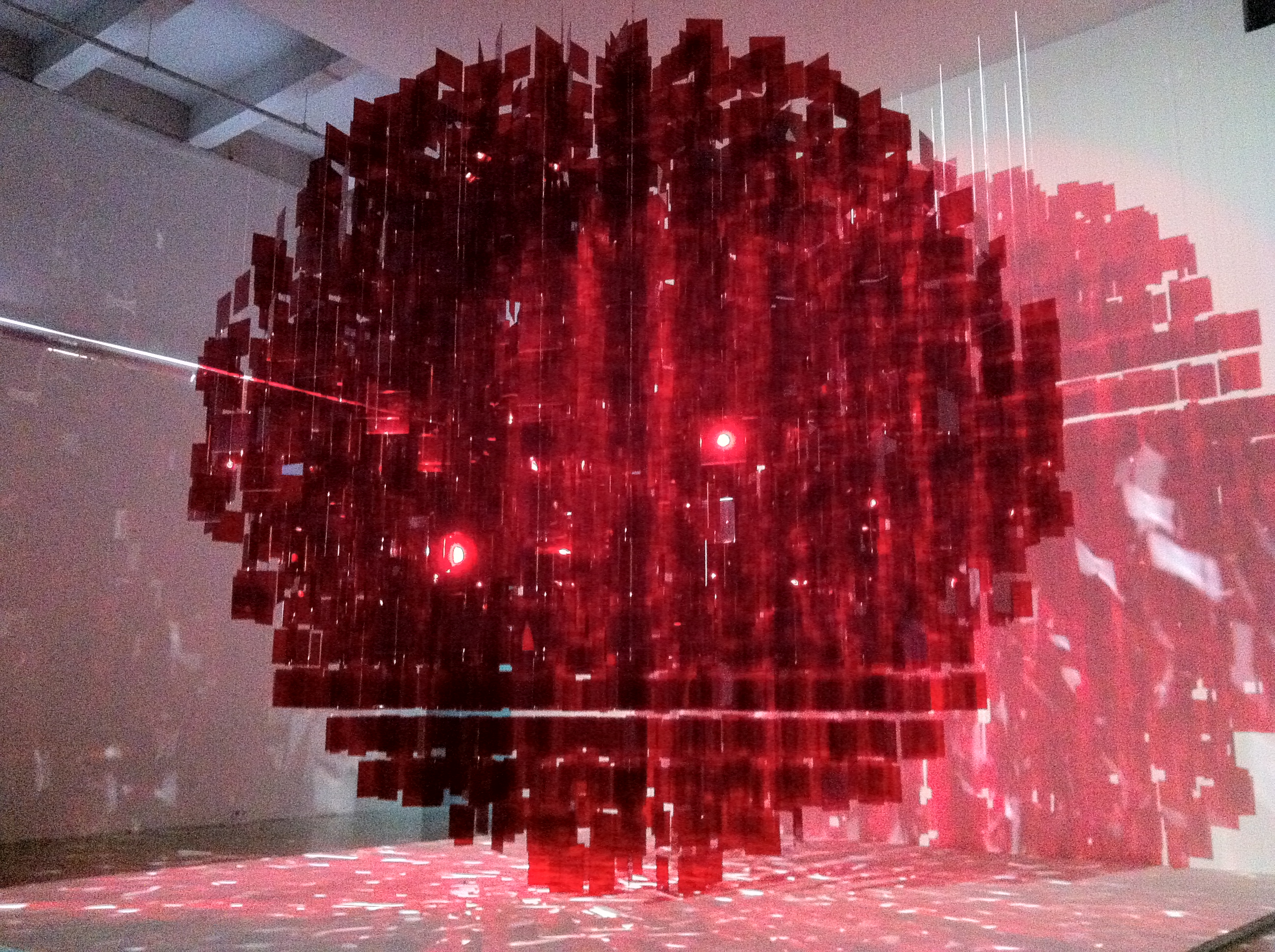
"Sphere Rouge" installed at Palais du Tokyo

Julio Le Parc (23 September 1928 – 30 May 2026) was an Argentine-born artist who focused on both modern op art and kinetic art. Le Parc attended the School of Fine Arts in Argentina. A founding member of the Groupe de Recherche d’Art Visuel (GRAV) and creator of award-winning artworks, he remains a significant figure in the history of Argentine modern art. He was bestowed the Konex Award from Argentina in 1982 and 2022.

== Background ==
Julio Le Parc was born on 23 September 1928 in Mendoza, Argentina, into a family of limited economic means. At age thirteen he moved with his mother and brothers to Buenos Aires. While there he attended the School of Fine Arts and showed growing interest in artistic avant-garde movement in Argentina.

A precursor of Kinetic Art and Op Art, founding member of Groupe de Recherche d’Art Visuel and recipient of the Grand Prize for Painting at the 33rd Venice Biennale in 1966, Julio Le Parc is a major figure in modern art history. The socially conscious artist was expelled from France in May 1968, after participating in the Atelier Populaire and its protests against major institutions.

Le Parc later lived and worked in Cachan, France. He died in Paris on 30 May 2026, at the age of 97.

== Career ==
=== Early ===
Le Parc found an interest in art at the age of thirteen when it was evident that, while he was a mediocre student, he was exceptional at sketching portraits and illustration cards. His environment, mainly being the School of Fine Arts significantly influenced the early part of his career. While there he attended night classes while working full-time. Le Parc took a special interest in the avant-garde artistic movements in Argentina: Movement of Arte Concreto Invencion. After attending the School for four and a half years he decided to leave the school and the area. He decided to go travel the country, and did not speak to his family for eight years. He later returned to the Academy of Fine Arts, where he took an active role in student movement groups. Le Parc graduated from the Academy of Fine Arts with Luis Wells and Rogelio Polesello. After returning, in 1958 Le Parc received a grant from the French Cultural Service to go to Paris. Much of his early career was committed to painting, engraving, and creating monotypes. However, in 1959 Le Parc begins his experimentation with image produced by light multiplied by layers of planes of Plexiglas. Le Parc participated in his first exhibition, Bienal de São Paulo in São Paulo, Brazil, in 1957.

=== Middle ===
Upon arriving in Paris in 1958 he connected with Jesús Rafael Soto and Carlos Cruz-Diez who were already in Paris. There they met Victor Vasarely, Georges Vantongerloo, Morellet, and Denise René, with whom they became friends. René, a French art dealer, was committed to the promotion of abstract art, and later helped launch kineticism. Upon building relationships with these fellow artists and moving permanently to Paris, Le Parc began to paint what came to be known as Surfaces Sequences. These are works in which the progression of forms with slight variations create illusions of rhythmic movements when completed. In 1960 the GRAV group was established with the collective strategy to delegate the creative act to the viewer. The group advocated for art to play a wider and more active role in society.

In 1966, Le Parc won the Grand Prize in Painting at the 33rd Biennale di Venezia, Venice. He had been living in Paris for eight years at the time of receiving the award. By this time, Le Parc had invested himself in experiments with light. Le Parc had personal experiences with light and mobiles in a translucid cube, as well as an animated piece of light projected on ceilings, walls and the floor. He was also experimenting with light on a reflecting cylinder.

A defender of human rights, he fought against dictatorship in Latin America. In 1972 he refused to hold a retrospective exhibition at the Musée d'Art Moderne de la Ville de Paris, after flipping a coin to make the decision.

=== Late ===
Le Parc continued his use of light and kinetics. However, "in the 1970s, Le Parc's artistic activities became less frequent, to the degree that his work almost went unnoticed in the international arena for several decades". Nonetheless, with a renewed interest in using light as a medium, Le Parc's work was brought to the attention of a wider public.

In 2004 he produced with Yvonne Argenterio in the Elettrofiamma workshops, Italy, a series of sculptures (Torsions) presented at the event "Verso la Luce", in the Castle of Boldeniga (Brescia, Italy). The monumental sculpture Verso la Luce is still visible in the castle garden. He received a one-man show at the Palais de Tokyo in Paris in 2013. He was socially committed to immersive art.

== Selected artworks ==
=== Mobil Transparent theme, 1960 ===
Mobil Transparent theme is made up of small pieces of Plexiglas connected together like a translucent cascade flowing from the ceiling. This work was the most highlighted work in his exhibition in Miami, United States, in 2011. This work was placed at the center of the main room, allowing the viewer to walk around it to see all the different angles reflected on a mirror directly below it on the floor. Le Parc made an additional version of this work, originally from 1960, for the exhibition in Miami. He was also in the school.

=== Light in Movement, 1962 ===
Light in Movement is another sensorial artwork as with all of Le Parc's works, which did not aim to be a narrative but experienced-based. The piece is made up of painted drywall, mirrors, stainless steel, nylon thread, and two spotlights. The work is approximately 42 ft. x 16 ft. x 16 ft. This artwork is found inside a dark semi-circular hallway where light is experienced as both a reflection and refraction. The viewer stands below the work and observes the myriad of twinkling lights around the space. This piece was also re-fabricated in 2010 for its installation at the Geffen. As with many of Le Parc's works form this time, in an interview with Alma Ruiz on MOCAs website, this piece focuses on the "visual experience and omits the anecdotal". Le Parc along with the other member of GRAV focused heavily on the viewers experience and interaction with the artworks.

=== Celule Avec Luminere un Vibration, 1968 ===
Similar to the Mobil Transparent theme, this piece was also a part of the Miami exhibition in 2011. The intention of Celule Avec Luminere un Vibration is to incorporate light and the sensorial experience of the viewer. This piece is from 1968 and is 150 x 157x 137 in. A projector displays light on a wall and changes pattern in a rhythmical way that appears to be a vibration. This piece was placed in a separate room by itself away from the other artworks to help the viewer enjoy the experiences of light and sound. The goal Is to make the viewer feel as though they were isolated from the rest of the world.

=== Alchemy 175 and 216, 1991–92 ===
One of Le Parc's key endeavors is the Alchemy series. He used two paintings from this series in the Miami exhibition of 2011, Alchemy 175 and Alchemy 216. The Alchemy series is titled Alchemy, followed by a number representing the order that it was created. Alchemy 175 is from 1991, and Alchemy 216 from 1992. These two pieces are SAID to be Le Parc's tribute to this science as they both explore the significance of water. Water is one of the four main elements of nature and is the symbol of flux, renovation, and purification. He is again exploring movement, however in these paintings he uses water, he does this by painting fountains sprinkling water in an umbrella form and using light to change the perception of the viewer.

=== Modulation 1160, 2004 ===
The Modulation series is another significant series Le Parc worked on beginning in the early 1970s. Again, similar to the Alchemy series, this series is titled Modulation, followed by a number in the order that it was created. Modulation 1160 is a work from 2004 in which many believe this is one of the finest works from the Modulation group. The piece is split into quarters, right in the middle from the top to the bottom with what appears to be a ray of light, and side to side with a structure that looks like an open fan. The work is acrylic on canvas and measures 39 ½ x 39 ½ in. This painting gives the illusion of movement of both the light and the fan at the same time. It appears that the light is actually activating the fan, thus putting it into motion. The Modulation series consists of hundreds of different works that Le Parc described as experiments.

=== Additional Artworks ===
- Images projetées, 1962
- Sol instable, 1964/2005
- Retrospectiva, Instituto Di Tella, Buenos Aires, 1967
- Rubans au vent, 1988
- Lumière sur mât, 1999

== Exhibitions ==
=== Solo ===
- Julio Le Parc, Tate Modern , London, United Kingdom, 11 June 2026–3 May 2027
- Julio Le Parc 1959, Metropolitan Museum of Art, New York, United States, 2018
- Perez Art Museum Miami (PAMM), Miami, Florida, United States, 2016
- Serpentine Sackler Gallery, London, United Kingdom, 25 November 2014–15 February 2015
- Palais de Tokyo, Paris, France, 2013
- Otra Mirada, Buenos Aires, Argentina, 2010
- Le Parc. Lumière. La Habana, Cuba, 2009
- Julio Le Parc et Vertige Vertical. Cachan, France, 2005
- Julio Le Parc - Verso la Luce - TORSIONS, scultura monumentale permanente nel giardino del Castello di Boldeniga-Brescia (Italia), 2004
- Alquimias. Quito, Ecuador, 1998
- Salle de jeux et travaux de surface. Arcueil, France, 1996
- Obra reciente. Valencia, Spain, 1991
- Modulazioni di Julio Le Parc. Brescia, Italy, 1988
- Galleria La Polena, Genova, Italy, 1979
- Galerie Denise René, New York, United States, 1973
- Kinetische Objekte. Ulm, Germany, 1970

=== Group ===
- Flash! Light and Movement. Tampere, Finland, 2009
- 50 años de pintura geométrica latino-americana. La Plata, Argentina, 2002
- Portes ouvertes. Cachan, France, 1994
- I Bienal de Cuenca. Cuenca, Ecuador, 1987
- Arte Programmata e Cinetica 1953–1963. Milan, Italy, 1983
- Brigade International de Peintres Antifascistes. Athens, Greece, 1975
- Kinetics. London, UK, 1970
- Light in Orbit. New York, New York, USA, 1967
- Groupe de Recherche d'Art Visuel. Paris, France, 1960
- IV Bienal de São Paulo. São Paulo, Brazil, 1957
