= Ralfonso Gschwend =

Swiss kinetic sculptor (born 1959)

Ralfonso "Ralf" Gschwend (born April 29, 1959) is a Swiss kinetic sculptor.

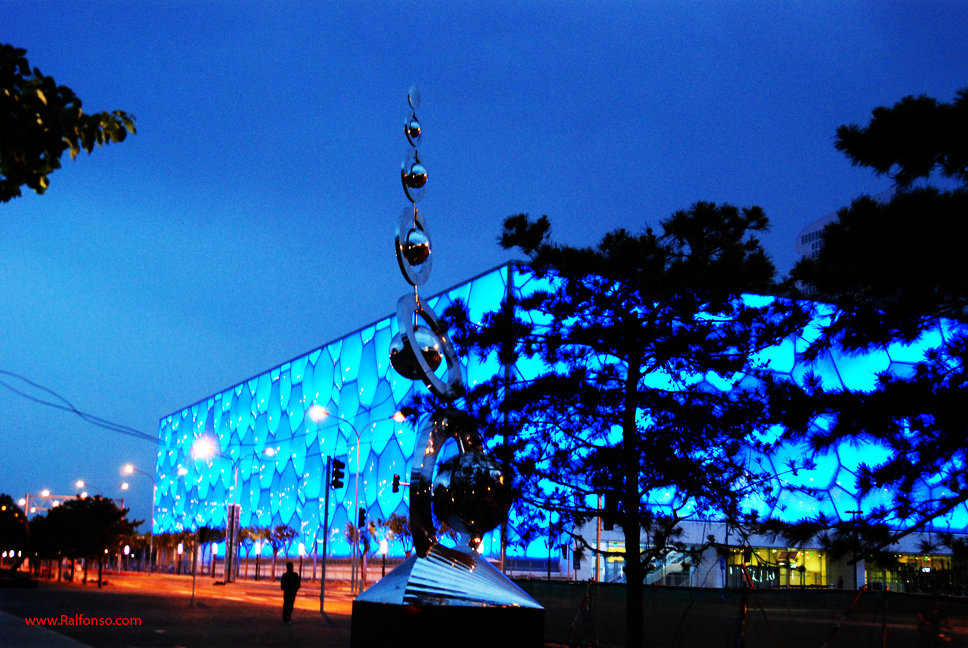
Dance with the Wind, Beijing Olympic Park, China

== Life and work ==
Sculpture designs range in size from 2 ft to 180 ft. Sculptures have been exhibited or installed in Switzerland, Russia, Netherlands, China, Germany and the USA.

As president from its inception, he co-founded the Kinetic Art Organization (KAO) www.kinetic-art.org in 2001 with a German and a US fellow Kinetic Artist. Now, with more than 1,000 members in over 60 Countries around the world, KAO has become the largest kinetic art organization in the world. KAO has co-organized Kinetic Art Exhibitions, such as the ART IN MOTION in The Netherlands, St. Petersburg, Russia, and the MomentuM exhibition at Grounds for Sculpture in New Jersey, USA.

As an award winner of the Beijing City Sculpture Competition 2007 and a finalist for the "Contest of Landscape Sculpture Designs for Beijing 2008 Olympic Games", Ralfonso was invited to speak at "Olympic Culture and Public Art Conference".
