= Nemo Gould =

American artist and sculptor

Nemo Gould (born October 3, 1975) is an American artist and sculptor known widely for his kinetic found-object sculpture as well as two-dimensional graphic work. Much of his work presents whimsical aluminum and wooden robotic and sci-fi creatures of as-yet unnamed and threatening genus and species. He cites Clayton Bailey as an early and inspirational influence.

== Biography ==
Gould was born in Minneapolis, Minnesota, and grew up in Nevada City, California. He earned his BFA from the Kansas City Art Institute in 1998, the alma mater of both of his parents, potter Linda Webb Elfert and ceramic artist and sculptor Arthur Gould. Nemo Gould holds a master's degree in Fine Arts from the University of California-Berkeley. His work has been shown at several museums, including the San Jose Museum of Art, the Berkeley Art Museum, and the Arizona Museum for Youth.

His work has been featured frequently in national media including the Discovery Channel, Wired, Travel and Leisure, Make and the San Francisco Chronicle.

=== Personal life ===
Nemo Gould lives in Oakland, California, with his wife Nancy Leung.

== Work with Recology ==
Gould was chosen in 2007 as an artist in residence at the Recology Solid Waste Transfer and Recycling Center, an honor given to the Bay Area's found object artists, who are given free access to the tons of consumer detritus collected daily at the dump.
