= Florence Gschwend =

Swiss chemical engineer

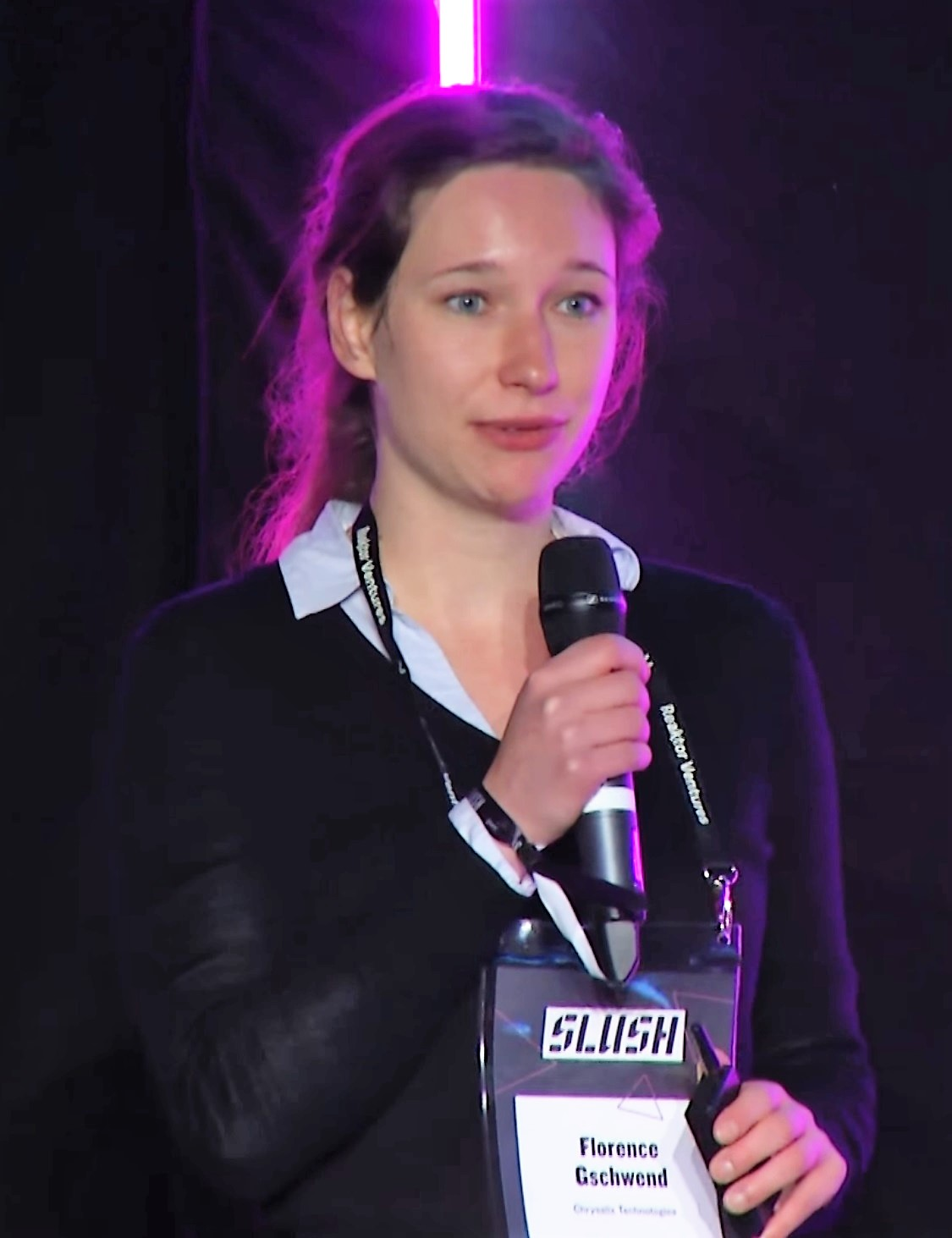
- Education: University of Basel; Imperial College London; Lawrence Berkeley National Laboratory
- Scientific career
- Workplaces: Imperial College London

Florence Gschwend is a Swiss chemical engineer and Royal Academy of Engineering Enterprise Fellow at Imperial College London. She is the founder and CEO of Lixea (formerly Chrysalix Technologies), a spin-out company that commercialises wood fractionation to enable a circular bioeconomy.

== Education and early career ==
Gschwend was born in Switzerland. She attended the Gymnasium Bäumlihof in Basel and was awarded the Novartis Maturanden Prize. She studied chemistry at the University of Basel, graduating in 2011. She was an intern in Syngenta and West Pomeranian University of Technology. She joined Imperial College London to complete a Masters of Research in Green Chemistry, looking at ionic liquid droplets for nanoreactors. She remained there for her doctoral studies, and was a member of the Grantham Research Institute on Climate Change and the Environment working with Jason Hallett and Paul Fennell. Her PhD looked at how chromated copper arsenate (CCA) treated wood could be used as a raw material for bio-refining using ionic liquids. During her research she worked at the Joint BioEnergy Institute at Lawrence Berkeley National Laboratory working on hydrothermal liquefaction of algae. She was a runner-up at the 2016 Althea Imperial program for women entrepreneurs, securing £10,000 funding to develop her PhD project into a business.

== Career ==
Gschwend is interested in how we can turn waste wood into renewable chemicals and fuels. She was awarded the European Institute of Innovation and Technology Change Award (€15,000) for her research project, conditioning biomass to use it to produce bioethanol and bioplastics. Gschwend was awarded a Royal Academy of Engineering Enterprise Fellowship in 2017. She was awarded a Future in Engineering Award. She was named in Forbes 30 Under 30 in 2017. She was featured in the Engineering and Physical Sciences Research Council Pioneer showcase. She joined Agnieszka Brandt-Talbot to apply for the Lean Launchpad for Synthetic Biology. In May 2018 Gschwend was selected as one of Information Age's Future Stars of Tech. She has discussed her work on the podcast The Sustainable Jungle.

=== Lixea ===
Alongside Jason Hallett and Agnieszka Brandt-Talbot, Gschwend is part of Lixea, formerly Chrysalix Technologies. In 2017 Chrysalix Technologies was awarded the Royal Society Translation Award to scale-up their research into the ways that ionic liquids can be used to treat wood biomass. They formally founded Chrysalix Technologies in June 2017. The technology is protected by three patents, including BioFlex and Ionosolv, which can separate lignin and hemicellulose from wood. The Chief Scientific Officer, Agnieszka Brandt-Talbot, is an Imperial College London Research Fellow working on lignin. They have secured funding from Climate-KIC and the European Investment Bank. They are carrying out work at the Biobase Europe plant in Ghent.
