= Vera Molnár =

Hungarian artist (1924–2023)

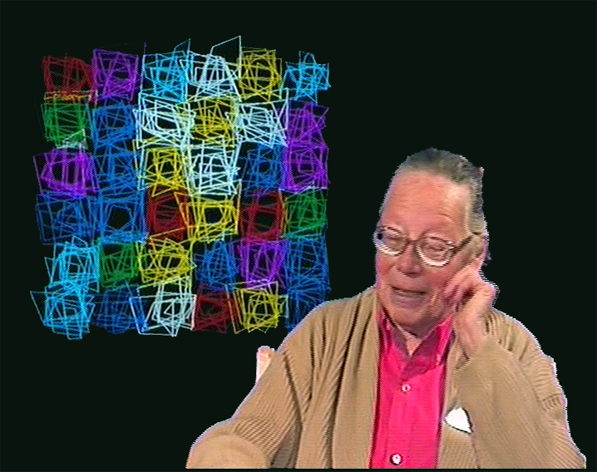
- Molnár in 1996
- Born: Vera Gács; 5 January 1924; Budapest, Kingdom of Hungary
- Died: 7 December 2023 (aged 99); Paris, France
- Education: Hungarian University of Fine Arts
- Known for: Generative art; op art; postconceptual art; computer art
- Spouse: François Molnár (m. 1948; died 1993)
- Website: www.veramolnar.com

Vera Molnár (née Gács; 5 January 1924 – 7 December 2023) was a Hungarian media artist who lived and worked in Paris, France. Molnár is widely considered to have been a pioneer of the generative art aspect of computer art. She was one of the first women to use computers in her fine art practice. In the 1960s, she founded two art groups in France concerned with the use of art and technology: the Groupe de Recherche d'Art Visuel and Art et Informatique.

Born in Hungary, she studied aesthetics and art history at the Hungarian University of Fine Arts. In the 1940s and 1950s, she created abstract paintings. By 1959 she was making combinatorial images and in 1968 she began using a computer to create her first algorithmic drawings.

In 1976, her first solo exhibition in the gallery of the London Polytechnic took place.

Her work has been widely collected by major museums. In 2007, she was named a Chevalier of Arts and Letters in France.

Molnár was selected as one of 213 artists for the 59th Venice Biennale in 2022.

== Life ==
Vera Molnár, born in 1924 in Hungary, was one of the pioneers of computer and algorithmic arts. Trained as a traditional artist, Molnár studied for a diploma in art history and aesthetics at the Budapest College of Fine Arts, where she graduated in 1947, and where she met her future husband, François Molnár (1922–1993) a scientist, with whom she collaborated. For a short while in 1947 she lived in Rome, before moving to Paris that same year. In 1948, she married Molnár.

Molnár iterated combinatorial images from as early as 1959. In 1968 she began working with computers, where she began to create algorithmic paintings based on simple geometric shapes and geometrical themes.

Molnár died on 7 December 2023, at the age of 99.

== Work ==
Molnár created her first non-representational images in 1946. These were abstract geometrical and systematically determined paintings. In 1947 she received an artists' fellowship to study in Rome at the Villa Giulia, and shortly after moved to France, where she resided until she died in Paris.

In the 1960s, Molnár co-founded several artist research groups. The first, in 1960, was the Groupe de Recherche d'Art Visuel, which investigated collaborative approaches to mechanical and kinetic art. The second was Art et Informatique, with a focus on art and computing. Molnár learned the early programming languages of Fortran and BASIC, and gained access to a computer at a research laboratory in Paris where she began to make computer graphic drawings on a plotter.

== Legacy ==
Molnár was part of the 2010 exhibition "On Line: Drawing Through the Twentieth Century" at the Museum of Modern Art in New York. The exhibition demonstrated the history of drawing lines.

A 2015 retrospective exhibition called "Regarding the Infinite | Drawings 1950–1987" was held at Senior & Shopmaker Gallery in New York City.

A 2024 show at Paris's Centre Pompidou exhibited Molnár's algorithmic work alongside her sketches and notes.

== Awards ==
In 2005 Molnár received the DAM Digital Arts Award for her life's work, which includes €20,000 prize, and a catalogued exhibition. Vera Molnár's exhibit, (Un)Ordnung.(Dés)Ordre. at the Museum Haus Konstruktiv shows her early freehand drawings never exhibited before, from the late-1960s to the new installation there, at the museum in Zürich.

Molnár was appointed Chevalier of Arts and Letters (2007) and won the outstanding merit award AWARE in 2018.

Molnár was one of 213 artists announced as part of the 59th Venice Biennale in 2022. The theme for the Venice Biennale is to "Challenge the Idea of 'Men as the Center of the Universe'."

== Collections ==
- Frac Lorraine, France
- Museum of Fine Arts Houston
- Museum of Modern Art, New York City
- Museum Ritter, Waldenbuch, Germany
- Morgan Library & Museum
- National Gallery of Art, Washington D.C.
- Tate, London
- Victoria and Albert Museum, London
- Kunstmuseum Reutlingen | konkret
- Los Angeles Country Museum of Art
