= Denise René =

French art dealer (1913–2012)

Denise René (born Denise Bleibtreu; June 1913 – 9 July 2012) was a French art gallerist specializing in kinetic art and op art.

== Life and work ==
Denise René believed that art must invent new paths in order to exist. The first exhibitions organised by René were in June 1945. She studied geometric abstraction and kinetic art. Her work has been championed by art historian Frank Popper.

René showed modern art masters such as Max Ernst and Francis Picabia during her first five years of activity. Denise René developed different generations of abstract art by introducing to Paris the historical figures of the concrete avant-gardes of Eastern Europe while seeking historical antecedents like Marcel Duchamp. In 1955 she organized the exhibition Le Mouvement, which helped to popularize kinetic art. Following that show she exhibited works by Nicolas Schöffer, Yacov Agam, Jean Tinguely, Otto Piene, Jean Arp, Alexander Calder, Carlos Cruz-Diez, Gun Gordillo, Jesús Rafael Soto, Henryk Stażewski, Victor Vasarely, Marino Di Teana, Sophie Taeuber-Arp, Gregorio Vardanega, Pol Bury, Wen-Ying Tsai, Le Corbusier, Robert Delaunay, Nadir Afonso, Max Bill and Sonia Delaunay, among others.

In 1957, she presented the first solo exhibition of Piet Mondrian in Paris. Aside from Paris, she had galleries in New York City (1971-1981) and Düsseldorf (1969) with Hans Mayer. In 2001, the Centre Georges Pompidou paid homage to her with an exhibition titled "Denise René, une galerie dans l'aventure de l'art abstrait. 1944-1978".

== See also ==
- Conceptual art
- Postmodern art
- Computer art
- Electronic art
- Systems art
- New Media Art
- Generative art
