= Francisco Sobrino =

Spanish sculptor

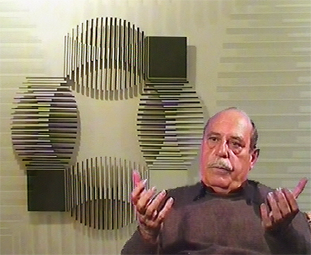
Francisco Sobrino

Francisco Sobrino (1932 – 11 May 2014) was a Spanish sculptor. His career began in 1959 when he moved to Paris to have a start in his career. His works can be seen in Tel Aviv, Guadalajara, Chicago, Madrid, New York City and Paris. Sobrino was born in Guadalajara, Spain and lived in Paris.

Sobrino died in France on 11 May 2014, at the age of 82.
