= List of op artists =

The following is a list of notable op artists:

- Yaacov Agam (1928-2026)
- Josef Albers (1888–1976)
- Richard Allen (1933–1999)
- Getulio Alviani (1939–2018)
- Edna Andrade (1917–2008)
- Anonima group
- Richard Anuszkiewicz (1930–2020)
- Marina Apollonio (born 1940)
- Gianni Colombo (1937–1993)
- Carlos Cruz-Díez (1923–2019)
- Tony DeLap (1927–2019)
- Hugo Demarco (1932–1995)
- Wojciech Fangor (1922–2015)
- Günter Fruhtrunk (1923–1982)
- Michael Kidner (1917–2009)
- Julio Le Parc (born 1928)
- Heinz Mack (born 1931)
- John McHale (1922–1978)
- Youri Messen-Jaschin (born 1941)
- Vera Molnar (1924–2023)
- François Morellet (1926–2016)
- Les Murdoch (born 1957)
- Reginald H. Neal (1909–1992)
- Andreas Nottebohm (born 1944)
- Andrzej Nowacki (born 1953)
- Ivan Picelj (1924–2011)
- Omar Rayo (1928–2010)
- Bridget Riley (born 1931)
- Kenneth Snelson (1927–2016)
- Jesús Rafael Soto (1923–2005)
- Arnold Alfred Schmidt (1930–1993)
- Julian Stanczak (1928–2017)
- Günther Uecker (born 1930)
- Grazia Varisco (born 1937)
- Kazys Varnelis (1917–2010)
- Jean-Pierre Yvaral (1934–2002)
- Victor Vasarely (1908–1997)
- Ludwig Wilding (1927–2010)
- Marian Zazeela (1940–2024)
