= Edwin Mieczkowski =

American modern op-art painter

Edwin "Ed" Mieczkowski
- Born: November 26, 1929; Pittsburgh, Pennsylvania
- Died: June 23, 2017 (aged 87)
- Education: Cleveland Institute of Art, Carnegie Mellon University
- Movement: Op-art

Edwin "Ed" Mieczkowski (November 26, 1929 – June 23, 2017) was an American visual artist and painter associated with the op-art movement in the U.S. He was one of the co-founders of the Anonima group along with Francis Hewitt and Ernst Benkert in Cleveland in 1960 and taught at the Cleveland Institute of Art from 1959 to 1998.

== Life and work ==
Photograph of the Anonima group with Edwin Mieczkowski seen standing in the middle

Mieczkowski was born in Pittsburgh, Pennsylvania on November 26, 1929. He received a bachelor's degree from the Cleveland Institute of Art followed by an MFA in painting and printmaking from Carnegie Mellon University in Pittsburgh in 1959. Mieczkowski was subsequently hired at the Cleveland Institute of Art as a faculty member. Together with Francis Hewitt and Ernst Benkert, he established the Anonima group in 1960. Working in close proximity and in neighboring studios, the artists "investigated problems in perception and design with quasi-scientific zeal". While allowing for individual ideological differences, they group members rejected "the artist’s political protests as utterly irrelevant".

In 1965, Mieczkowski's work was included in Responsive Eye, an exhibition at The Museum of Modern Art in New York which helped promote op-art as a distinct movement. Fellow artists associated with the Cleveland art scene, including Julian Stanczak and Richard Anuszkiewicz, also participated in the 1965 show. Mieczkowski's optical paintings were aligned with the neo-constructivist tendencies as a reaction against Abstract expressionism in America during the 1960s and 1970s. According to the American art historian Edward B. Henning, Mieczkowski's approach to painting is reminiscent of Paul Cézanne's work, particularly in regard to the artist's "synthesis of painterly qualities and structural order".

In 2009, he was awarded the Alumni Achievement (Merit) Award from the Carnegie Mellon University. He died on June 23, 2017, at the age of 87 while in hospice care following multiple organ failures earlier that month. His work is included in the permanent collections of the Cleveland Museum of Art, the Akron Art Museum, and the New Jersey State Museum, among other institutions in the United States.
