= Edward Henning =

Edward Henning may refer to:

- Edward J. Henning (1868–1937), United States district judge
- Edward B. Henning (1922–1993), American art historian
