= Marina Apollonio =

Italian painter and optical artist

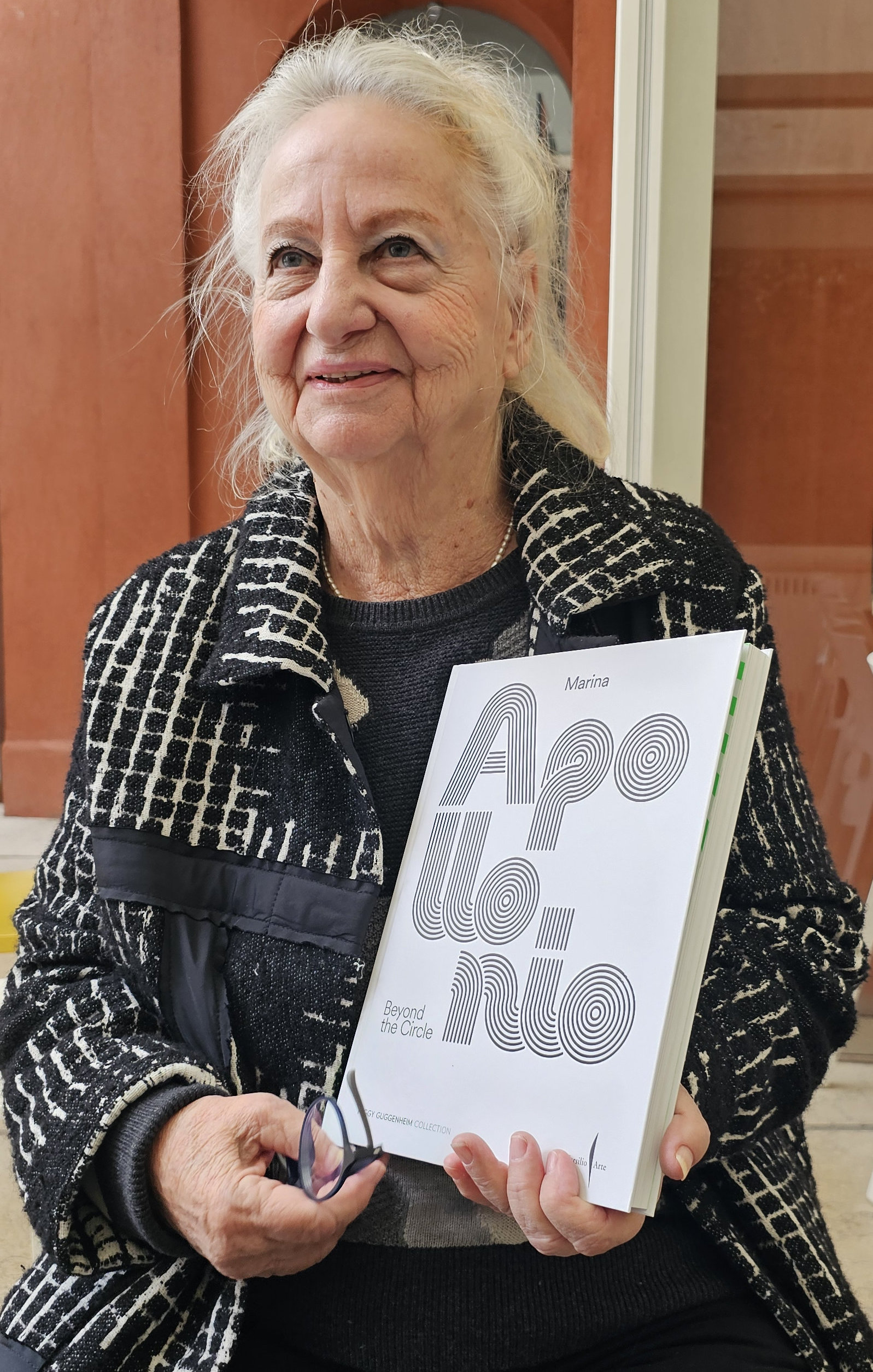
- Born: 12 November 1940 (age 85); Trieste, Italy
- Known for: painting
- Movement: Op art, kinetic art

Marina Apollonio (born 12 November 1940) is an Italian painter and optical artist. She lives and works in Padua.

== Work ==
Apollonio was born in Trieste on 12 November 1940. She and her family moved to Venice when she was eight. In Venice she attended the Accademia di Belle Arti di Venezia.

In 1963, Apollonio produced her first work, Metal Reliefs with Alternate Color Sequences. She shared with other Op-Artists the interest in a depersonalized art, as opposite to Abstract Expressionism. She used industrial material in her process, creating dynamic and fluctuating environments in the user's perception.

In 1965, she became part of the international Op art movement, meeting and exhibiting with artists such as Gruppo N Padua; Gruppo T Milan; Getulio Alviani; Dadamaino and Azimuth Milan. In the same year she was invited to Nova Tendencija 3, an international group show held at the Galerija Suvremene Umjetnosti in Zagreb, to Aktuel ’65 at the Galerie Aktuel Bern and, together with Getulio Alviani and Paolo Scheggi, the Oeuvres Plastiques et Appliquèes at Galerie Smith in Brussels.

In 1975, Apollonio started making work based on the orthogonal relationship of parallel colored lines. In 1981 she expanded her practice to textiles, showing her works at the Laboratorio Artivisive Foggia and later, in 1983, at the exhibitions Morbide & Trame, at the Civica Galleria d’Arte Contemporanea in Foggia and Testi Tessili, at the Il Monte Analogo Library in Rome.

In 2007, she presented her work Spazio ad attivazione cinetica 1967-1971/2007, a 10-meter rotating disc, in the Schirn Kunsthalle Frankfurt for the international show Op Art, where she was invited to exhibit together with Victor Vasarely, Bridget Riley, François Morellet, Julio Le Parc and Gianni Colombo. Her work has also been included in other Op art shows such as Optic Nerve: Perceptual Art of the 1960s, at the Columbus Museum of Art and Bit International Nove tendencije - Computer und visuelle Forschung. Zagreb 1961-1973, at the Neue Galerie in Graz.

Her works have been reviewed by major news publications.

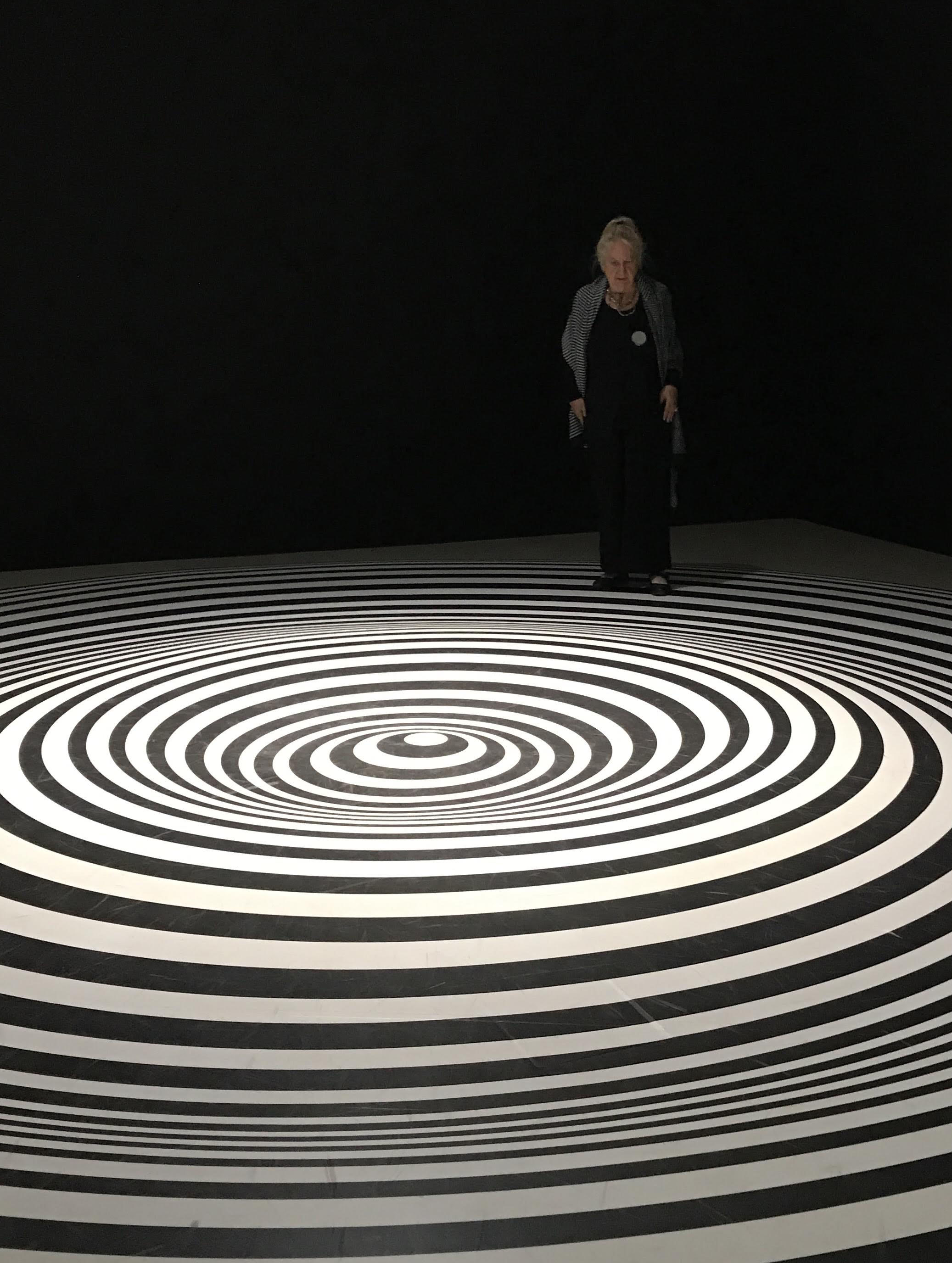
Marina Apollonio immersed in her work - September 2019

== Bibliography ==
- Giancarlo Illiprandi, "La breve stagione dell’Op", Fotografia Italiana, no. 105, March 1966
- George Rickey, Constructivism, Origins and evolution, George Braziller, New York, 1967
- Franco Sossi, Luce spazio strutture, La Cornice, Taranto, 1967
- Marina Apollonio, "Un’arte fatta di scetticismo", Centroarte, no. 1, November, 1967
- Filiberto Menna, Arte Cinetica e Visuale, in "L’Arte Moderna", Fratelli Fabbri Editori, Milan, 1967
- Bruno Munari, Design e comunicazione visiva, Laterza Editori, Bari, 1968
- Guy Brett, Kinetic Art: The Language of Movement, Studio Vista, London, 1968
- Udo Kultermann, Nuove Forme della Pittura, Feltrinelli, Milan, 1969
- Frank Popper, L’Arte Cinetica, l’immagine del movimento nelle arti plastiche dopo il 1860, Einaudi, Turin, 1970
- Titus Mocanu, "Ambiguitatea sensibilității estetice", Arta, no. 6, 1970
- Italo Tomassoni, Arte dopo il 1945 in Italia, Cappelli Editore, Bologna, 1971
- Klaus Groh, If I had a Mind…, DuMont, Cologne, 1971
- Cyril Barrett, An introduction to Optical Art, Studio Vista, London, 1971
- Lea Vergine, Qui arte contemporanea, Rome, 1971
- Lea Vergine, "Arte Programmata", Arte Contemporanea, no. 7, December 1971
- Ernesto L. Francalanci, "Marina Apollonio", Art International, vol. XV/6, June 1971
- Gianni Contessi, "La IX biennale della grafica di Lubiana", Gala, no. 49, September 1971
- Gillo Dorfles, W. Skreiner, exhibition catalogue, Neue Galerie, Graz, 1973
- Lea Vergine, L’Arte cinetica in Italia; Manfredo Massironi, Ricerche Visuali, Galleria Nazionale d’Arte Moderna, Rome, 1973
- Alessandro Faré, Le Arti Figurative, Mursia, Milan, 1973
- Italo Tomassoni, "Lo spontaneo e il programmato", Design, n. 2, June–August 1973
- Michel Seuphor, "La tendenza alla ripetizione dei segni geometrici semplici nell’arte contemporanea", Arte e Società, no. 10, October 1973
- Luciano Caramel, Marina Apollonio, Galleria il Nome, Vigevano, Italy, 1974
- Frank Popper, Art-Action and Participation, Studio Vista, London, 1975
- Simona Weller, Il complesso di Michelangelo, La Nuova Foglio Editore, Pollenza-Macerata, 1976
- Carlo Belloli, Marina Apollonio: anticampi cromoformali ottico rotatori/cinestensivi a radiazione progressiva, Arte Struktura, Milan, 1979
- Karina Tűrr, Op Art – Stil, Ornament oder Experiment, Gebr. Mann Verlag, Berlin, 1986
- Angela Vettese, Marina Apollonio, Palazzo dei Diamanti, Ferrara, 1989
- Lea Vergine, L’Arte in trincea, Skira, Milan, 1996
- Arnauld Pierre, "The Kinetic Eye: Optical and Kinetic Art, 1950–1975", Musée d’Art Moderne et Contemporain, Strasbourg, 2005
- Tobias Hoffmann, Die Neuen Tendenzen – Eine europäische kűnstlerbewegung 1961 – 1973, Edition Braus, 2006
- David Rimanelli, "Beautiful Loser: Op Art Revisited"; S. K. Rich, "Allogories of Op", Artforum, May, 2007
- Martina Weinhart, Max Hollein, Op Art, Schirn Kunsthalle, Frankfurt, 2007
- Joe Houston, Ugo Savardi, Bianca Maria Menichini, Marina Apollonio, Columbus Museum of Art, New York, 2007
- Christa Steinle, exhibition catalogue, Neue Galerie, Graz, 2008
- Margit Rosen, A Little-Known Story about a Movement, in Art: New Tendencies and Bit International, 1961-1973, ZKM, Karlsruhe, 2011
- Giovanni Granzotto and Mariastella Margozzi, Arte Cinetica e Programmata, Il Cigno GG Edizioni, Rome, 2012
- Massimiliano Gioni and Gary Carrion–Murayari, Ghost in the Machine, Skira, Milan, 2012
