= Reginald Neal =

Reginald Neal may refer to:

- Reginald Neal (footballer) (1914–?), English footballer
- Reginald Neal (cricketer) (1901–1964), English cricketer
- Reginald H. Neal (1909–1992), American painter and printmaker
