= Edna Andrade =

American artist (1917–2008)

- Born: January 25, 1917; Portsmouth, Virginia, US
- Died: April 17, 2008 (aged 91); Philadelphia, Pennsylvania, US
- Education: Pennsylvania Academy of Fine Arts
- Known for: Oil Painting
- Movement: Op Art Geometric Abstraction

Edna Andrade (January 25, 1917 – April 17, 2008) was an American abstract artist. She was an early Op Artist.

== Op Art ==
The Op Art movement refers to paintings and sculptures that use illusions or optical effects. Op art includes graphic elements and use of color that similarly appears in works from other movements such as Post Impressionism, Futurism, Constructivism, and Dadaism.

== Early life and education ==
Edna Davis Wright was born on January 25, 1917, in Portsmouth, Virginia. Between 1935 and 1936 Andrade studied at the Barnes Foundation in Merion, Pennsylvania. From the age of eight, she was encouraged to practice drawing and painting. In 1937 she attained a Bachelor of Fine Arts degree from the University of Pennsylvania. In 1938 she completed Post Graduate studies at the Pennsylvania Academy of Fine Arts.

While at the Pennsylvania Academy of Fine Arts, Andrade was awarded two Cresson Traveling Scholarships. While traveling post World War II, Andrade encountered the Bauhaus movement and other examples of German modernism. The artistic experimentation happening in Europe influences Andrade's approach to design, color, and abstraction.

In 1941 she married architect Preston Andrade and they moved to Philadelphia in 1946, where she would remain for the rest of her life.

== Career ==
After her studies, Andrade taught art at an elementary school in Norfolk, Virginia. Subsequently, she taught at Tulane University in New Orleans. Upon her move to Philadelphia, she began teaching at The University of the Arts, where she taught for thirty years. In her early career she drafted on a freelance basis, but did not take charge of her career until her marriage ended.

Andrade's early work includes water color collages and ink drawing of abstracted landscapes (an outpouring of art). During World War II, she worked on propaganda materials for what is now the CIA. Over the course of her career she created public artwork, commissioned by the Free Library of Philadelphia and the Salvation Army.

Beginning in the 1950s, Andrade painted highly abstract, geometric paintings that used a limited color palette and variety of shapes. Her work is in numerous collections including the Philadelphia Museum of Art; National Gallery of Art, Washington, D.C.; Minneapolis Institute of Art; Pennsylvania Academy of the Fine Arts, Philadelphia; Museum of Fine Arts, Houston; Dallas Museum of Art; Virginia Museum of Fine Arts, Richmond; Baltimore Museum of Art; Utah Museum of Fine Arts, Salt Lake City; Delaware Art Museum, Wilmington; and the Museum of Contemporary Art of Buenos Aires, Argentina, Her papers are held at the Archives of American Art.

=== Style ===
As a part of the Op art movement, Andrade's style confronts the nature of perception, creating highly abstracted, geometric images. Her oil paintings possess illusionistic qualities, hence "optical art." As Andrade began creating illusionistic art, she shifted from organic abstraction to hard-edge geometry, emphasizing symmetrical squares and color juxtapositions.

Andrade's style of painting often produces hallucinatory compositions, psychedelic in appearance and often as if they are moving. Her paintings have no narrative, nor subject matter, which situate Andrade as an abstract artist. In an interview with The Philadelphia Inquirer, Andrade comments on her paintings, stating, "It's not like showing your emotion. It's a decision to be totally visual. A story doesn't go with it." As demonstrated by Andrade and her paintings, they are complex visual experiences, based in aesthetic experimentation rather than storytelling.

Her style is best exhibited in her most famous painting, Motion 4-64. Motion 4-64 is a 48-inch square oil painting featuring black and white rectangles. The edges bend inward, pulling the viewer into the center of the canvas, creating an illusionary experience. She implements curvilinear lines to create an illusionistic space, in which the audience visually experiences movement within the geometric, flowing design. Other paintings such as Turbo I, from 1965, integrate the science of perception into the viewer's experience by using lines and circular movements to create aesthetically engaging canvasses.

In her later work, Andrade returns to painting abstracted landscapes and practices the more fundamental art techniques she learned while at the Pennsylvania Academy of Fine Arts.

=== Influences ===
Andrade listed artists who particularly influenced her style including Paul Klee, Piet Mondrian, and Josef Salvador González Ruvalcaba the María Del Refugio González BarajasAlbers. Andrade also notes that she was influenced by architectural design, philosophy, mathematics, and design (Locks bio). She was specifically inspired by things such as astrophysics and Freudian psychology, contributing to the complexity and detail of her paintings.

== Death ==
Andrade died on April 17, 2008, at the age of 91 in Philadelphia, Pennsylvania.

== Recognition ==
In 1991 Andrade received Philadelphia's Mayor's Arts and Culture Award for Visual Arts as well as the Distinguished Teaching Award from the College Art Association in 1996.

== Legacy ==
In 1997, the Leeway Foundation established the Edna Andrade Emerging Artist Award to encourage and assist female artists in their artistic careers. In 2013, the Edna Andrade Summer Scholarship was established at the University of Pennsylvania, providing travel for student researchers.

There have been two major retrospectives of Andrade's work. The first was held in 1993 at the Pennsylvania Academy of Fine Arts and the second in 2003 at the Institute of Contemporary Art at the University of Pennsylvania.

Andrade's artwork was more popular toward the end of her career and after her death. Although she is considered an influential Op artist, she was left out of the New York art scene due to her location in Philadelphia.

=== Select exhibitions ===
- Cool Waves and Hot Blocks: The Art of Edna Andrade, (1993) Pennsylvania Academy of Fine Arts
- Edna Andrade, Optical Paintings: 1963-1988, (2003) Institute of Contemporary Art, Philadelphia
- Pop Art and Its Affinities (2006-2007) Philadelphia Museum of Art, Philadelphia
- Edna Andrade Optical Paintings, 1960-1966, (2007) Locks Gallery
- Optic Nerve: Perceptual Art of the 1960s (2007) Columbus Museum of Art, OH
- Close at Hand, (2011) The Fabric Workshop and Museum, Philadelphia
- Color Motion: Edna Andrade Prints, (2012) The Print Center, Philadelphia
