= Inabel =

Patterned cotton textile from the Philippines

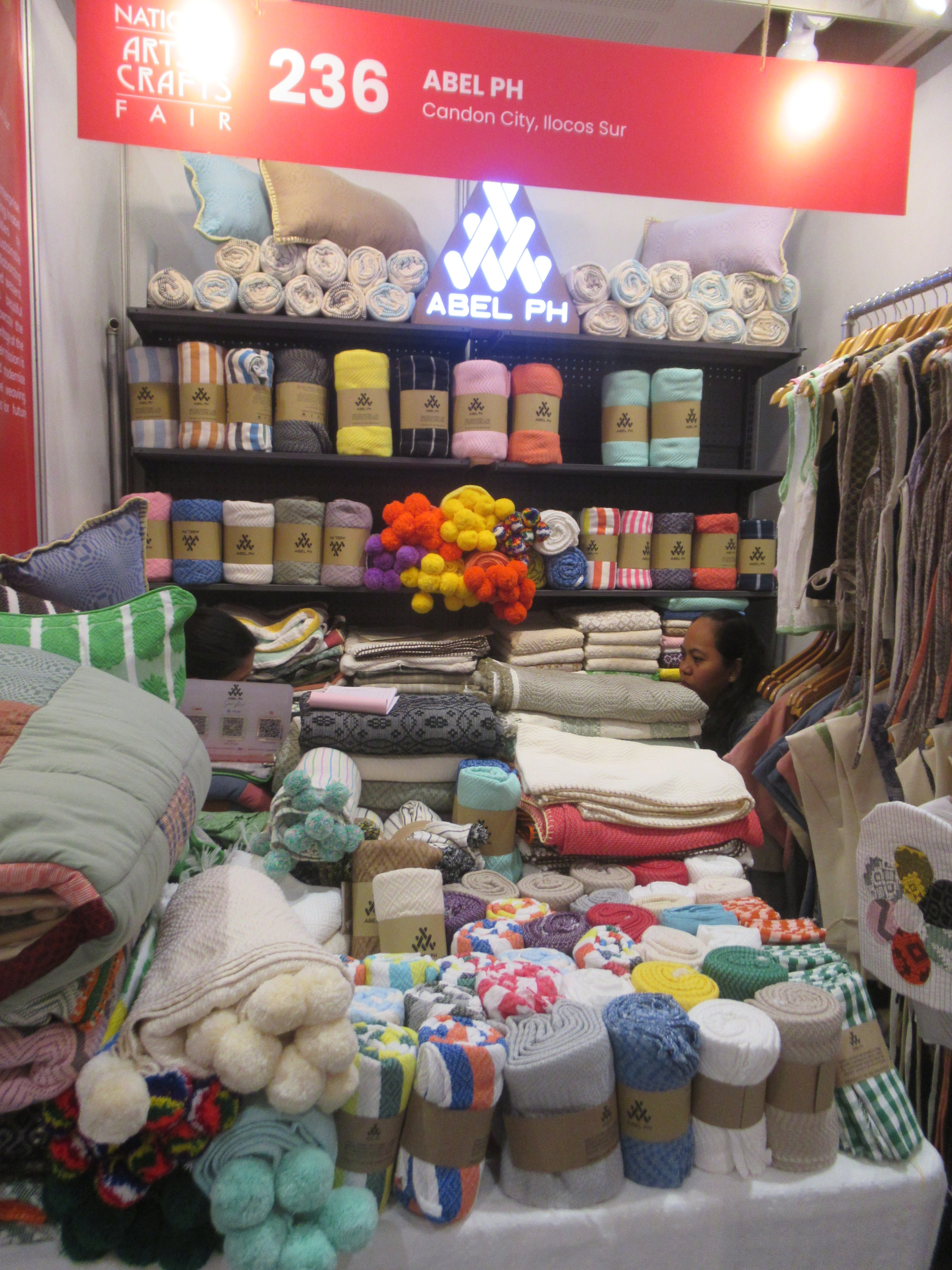
- A collection of inabel products exhibited during the National Artist & Craft.
- Type: Art fabric textile
- Material: Cotton
- Production method: Weaving
- Production process: Craft production
- Place of origin: Ilocos Region, Philippines

Inabel, also commonly known as Abél or Abél-Ilóco, is a patterned cotton textile native to the Philippines, particularly in the Ilocos Region in Northern Luzon. It is a native hand-weaving tradition of the Ilocano people. Known for its versatility, softness, durability, suitability in tropical climates, and for its austere design patterns.

The tradition of panagabel (weaving) is deeply embedded in Ilocano culture and identity. Among its notable practitioners is Magdalena Gamayo, recognized as a National Living Treasure for her mastery of inabel weaving techniques and her role in preserving the craft.

== Description ==
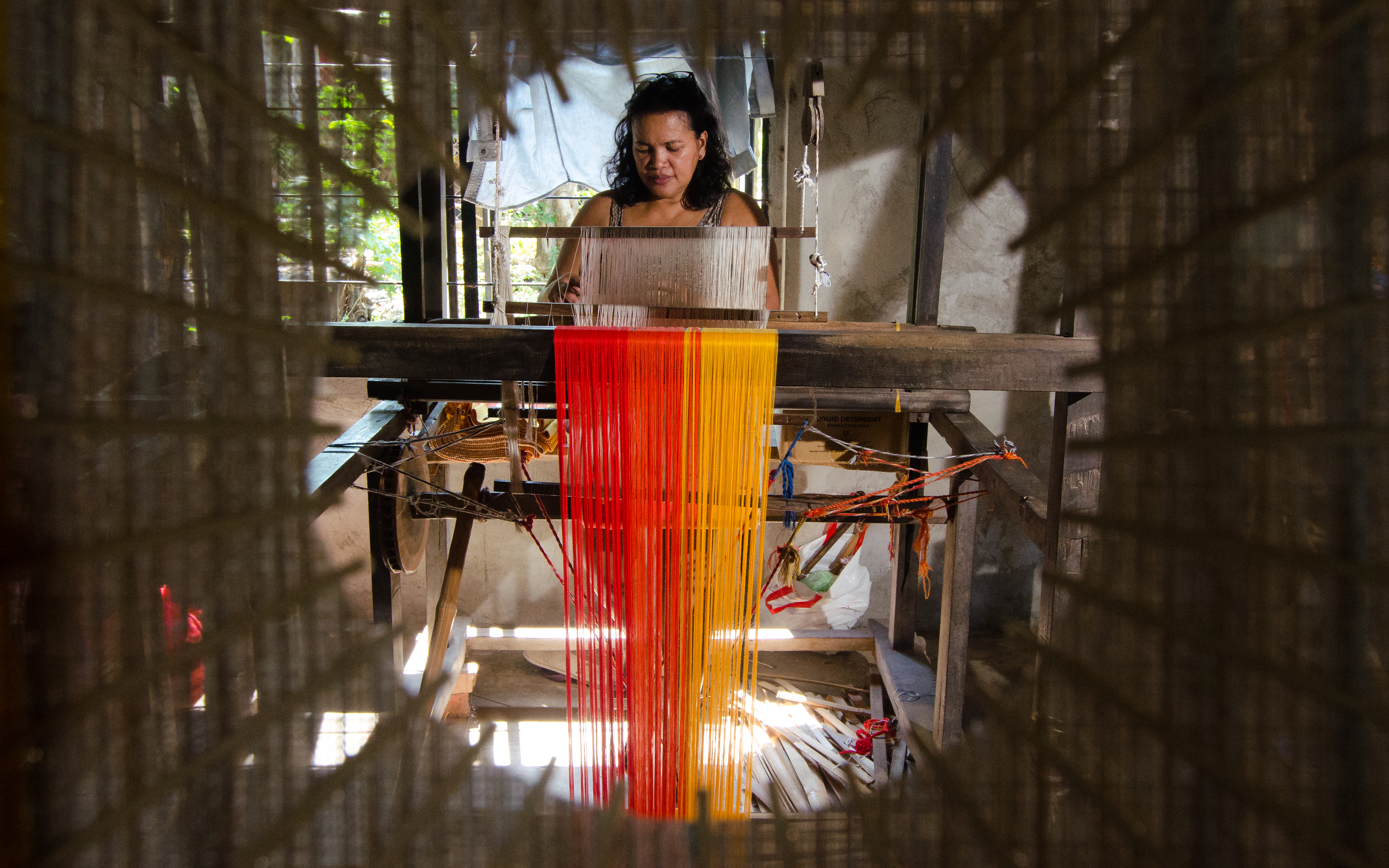
An Ilocana Inabel weaver from Vigan City, Ilocos Sur, using a tillar, a traditional wooden handloom weaving machine.

Inabél or Abél is a traditional handwoven textile found in the Ilocos Region and the province of Abra that carries the soul of the Ilocano people. “Abel” is the Iloco word for weave, and “Inabel” can be interpreted to mean any kind of woven fabric. It is made of cotton fibres and may be plain or patterned, using pagablan or tilar (pedal loom).

Traditional coloring dye includes the indigo cakes, which are made from the leaves of tayum (Indigofera suffruticosa) used in coloring textiles and threads that produce bluish to dark purple hue. Kunig plant (turmeric), the rhizomes, is used to produce yellowish hue.

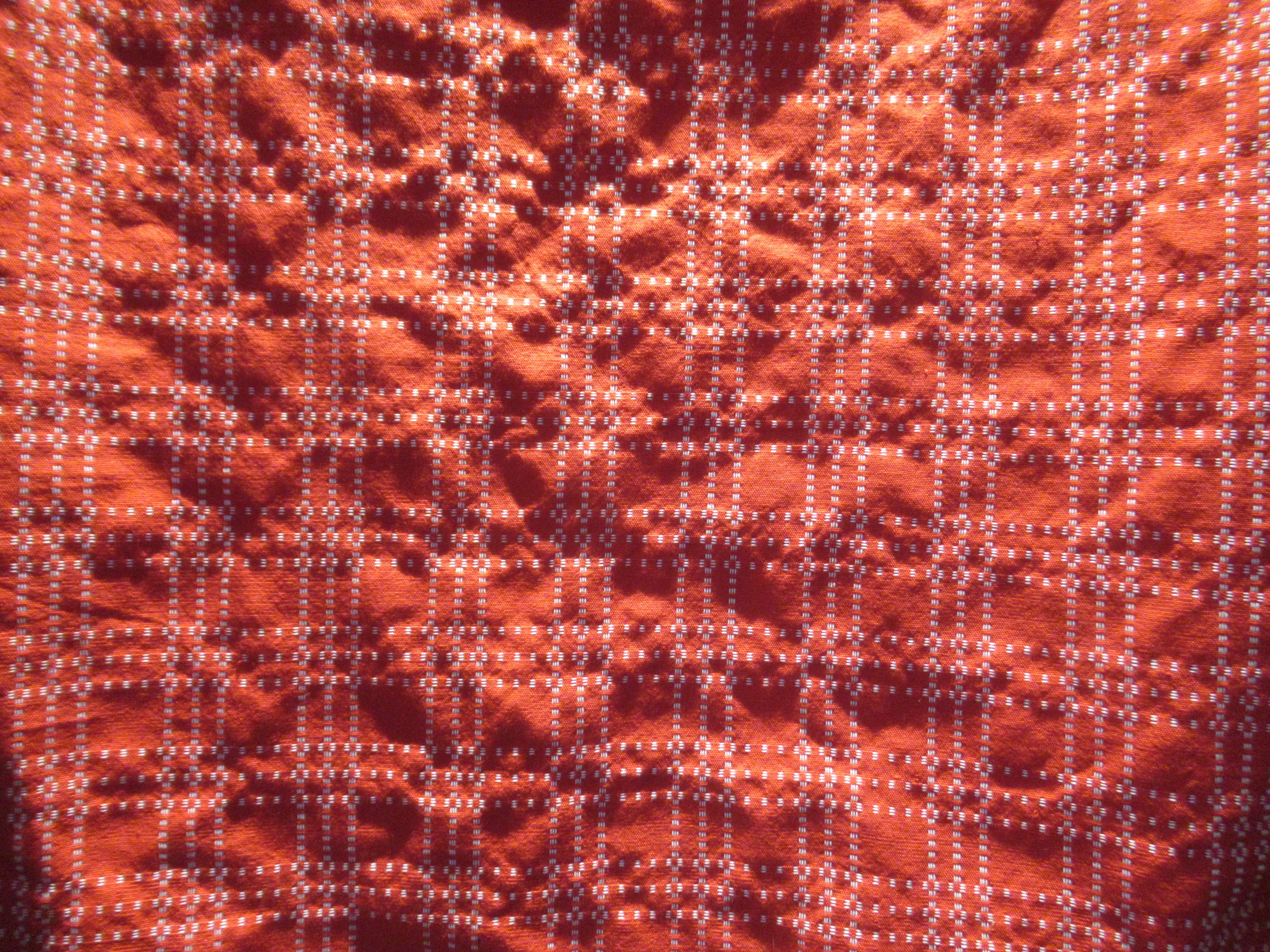
Inabel woven by National Living Treasure Magdalena Gamayo from Pinili, Ilocos Norte.

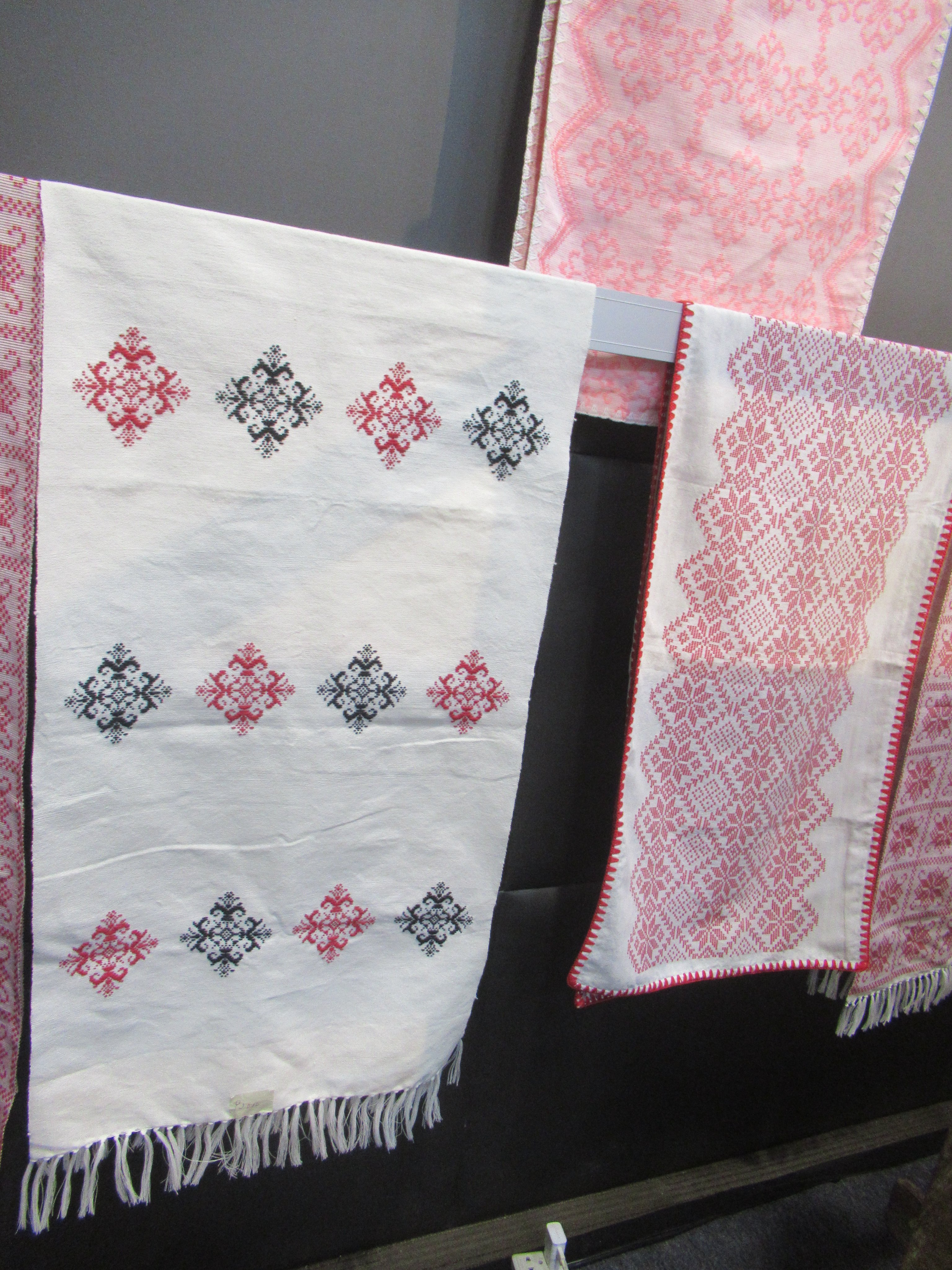
Abel-Iloco is intricately woven with traditional patterns such as sinan-sabong, a floral motif

Each province has its own distinct pattern design style. Ilocos weavers use hardwood pedal looms, employing different design techniques. The binakul pattern (whirlwinds), a dizzying pattern, is meant to ward off and distract evil spirits, protecting the wearer. Other patterns include the multi-heddle design technique, the pinilian or brocade weave, the suk-suk or discontinuous supplementary weft technique, and the ikat tie-dye technique. Each province has its own distinct design style. In Bangar, La Union, “diamond,” “sampaguita,” “zigzag,” and “hula-hoops” are the common patterns. Popular patterns include cat's paws, fans, stars, and windows.

While National Living Treasure Magdalena Gamayo has perfected her skills on her own, teaching herself traditional inabel patterns such as binakul (whirlwinds, her specialty), inuritan (geometric patterns), sinan-sabong (flowers), and kusikos (spiral forms). She has also taught herself to recreate patterns even without a sample from which to refer. In 2012, her unparalleled command of inabel weaving was recognized as she was accorded the GAMABA or National Living Treasures Award. To date, she is one of only 16 awardees.

=== Preparation ===
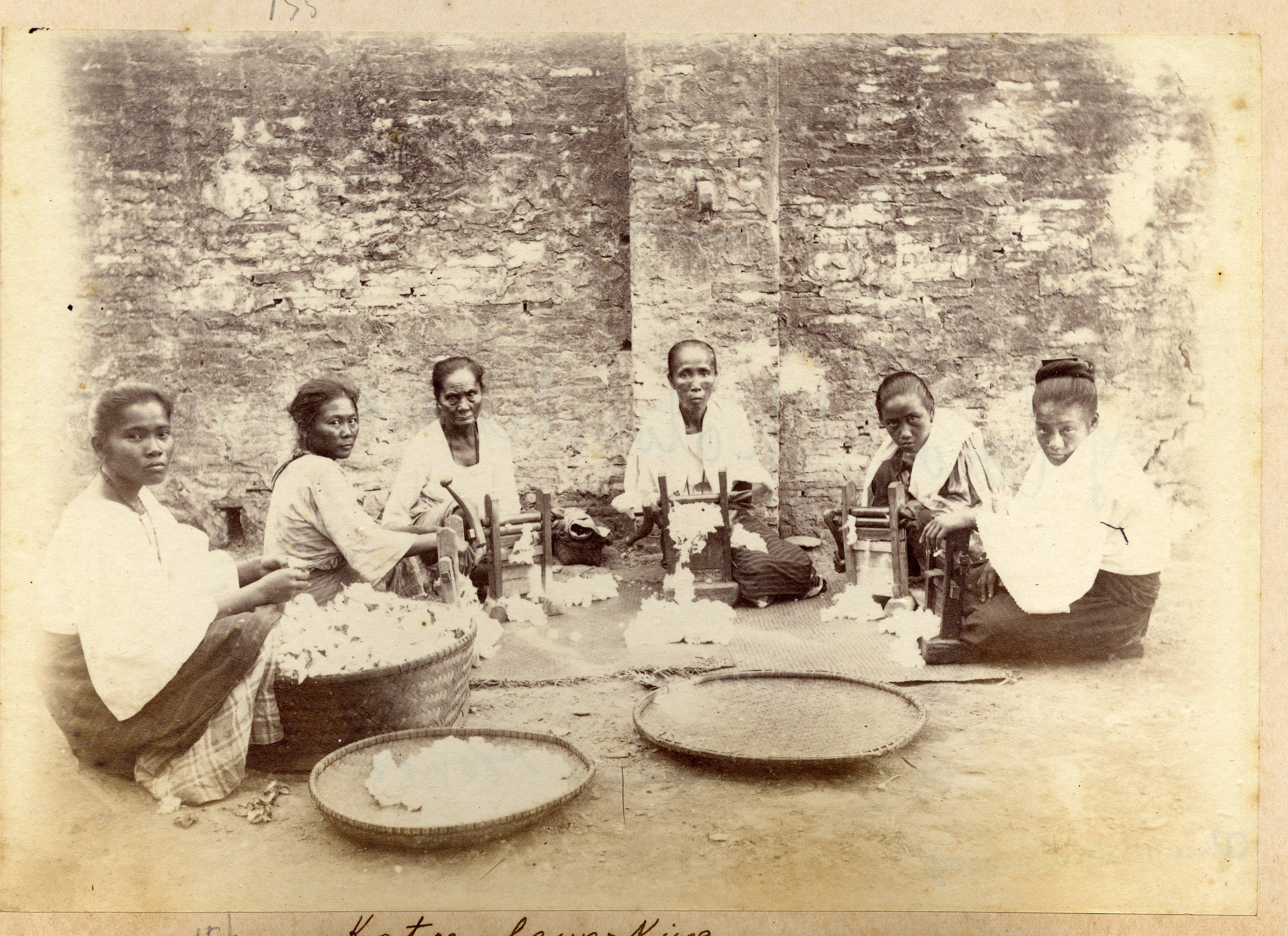
Ilocano women processing cotton for abel weaving, circa 1885

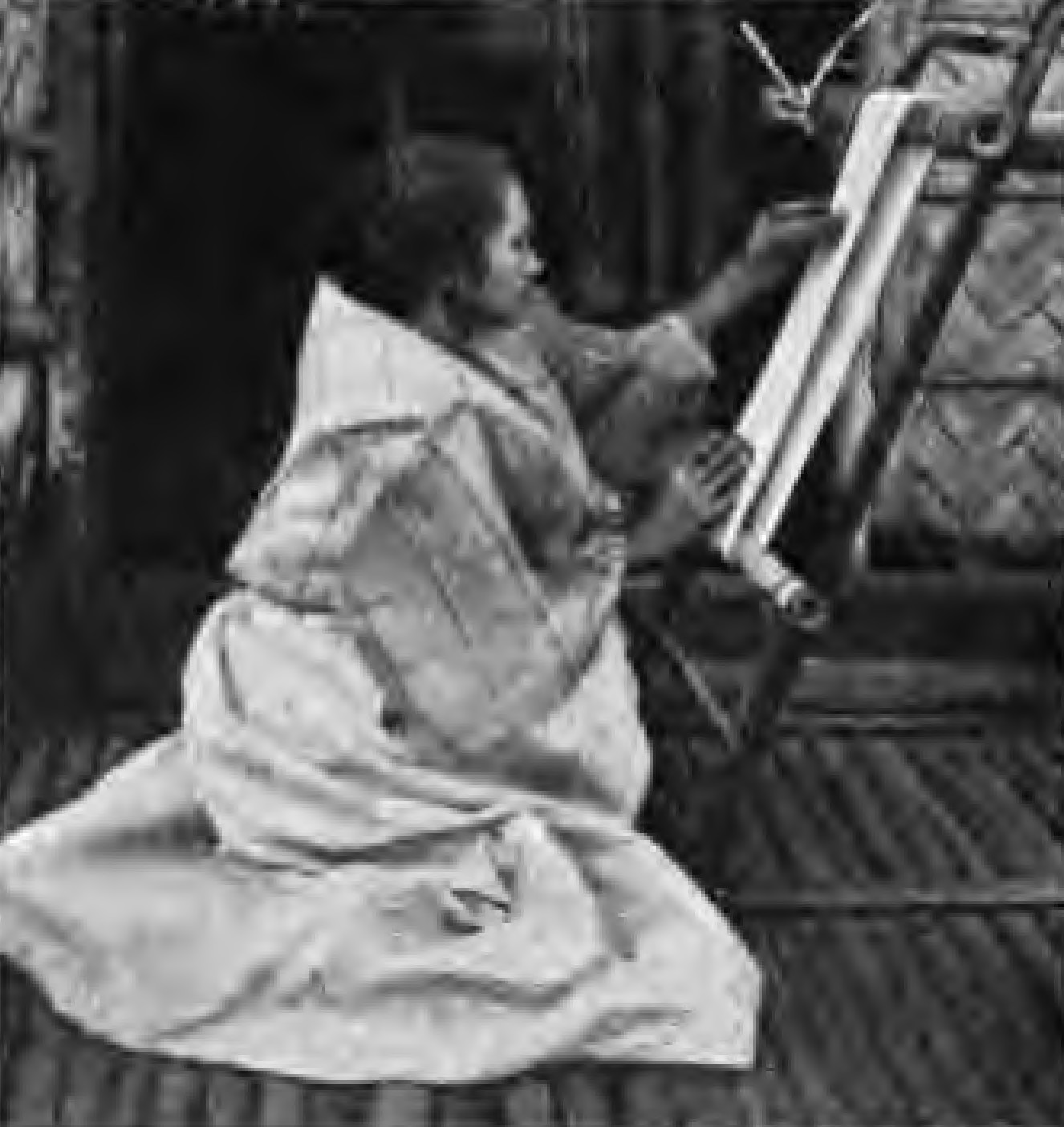
Ilocano woman combing cotton yarn, c. 1900s.

The traditional process of weaving abel cloth involves several stages, starting with the preparation of cotton. This process includes picking the cotton balls, removing the seeds, pounding or beating the fibers, twisting them using a spindle, and winding the resulting yarn onto a skeiner. The skeined yarn is then brushed to improve its gloss and durability before being wound onto a bamboo spool. Once the yarn is prepared, the loom is set up.

The weaver proceeds by transferring the yarn from the spool to the warping reel, then winding it onto the warp beam rod. The subsequent step is heddling, where the warp yarn is threaded through the eye of the heddle using a weaving hook. After this, the yarn is passed through the reed’s gaps, and the loom is "dressed" by securing the heddles behind the beater. Only after these steps can the actual weaving, known as agabel, commence.

Traditional Steps of Weaving

- Pinagbukag ti kapas – picking of cotton balls.
- Panagladdit ti kapas – removing the seeds with the use of a cotton gin.
- Panangbatbat ti kapas – pounding or beating with the use of the lagundi sticks.
- Panangsunay / Panangtibbi ti kapas (Twisting) – twisting the cotton using the spindle.
- Panagilabay ti sagot (Skeining) – winding the cotton yarn into the skeiner.
- Panagtagud iti nailabay nga sagot (Combing) – brushing the skeined yarn to make it durable and glossy.
- Panagpulipol ti sagot (Spooling) –winding the skeined yarn to the bamboo spool.
- Panaggan-ay ti sagot (Warping) – winding the spool yarn into the warping reel or tool for warping.
- Pananglukot ti sagot (Beaming) – winding the warp yarn into the warp beam rod.
- Pinagisubo iti Gur-on (Heddling) – inserting the warp yarn through the heddle eye with the use of the weaver’s hook.
- Pinagisubo iti Sugod (Sleying) – inserting the warp yarn through the dents or spaces of the reed with the use of the weaver’s hook.
- Pinagipakat diay Pagablan (Tie-up / tying- in) – dressing the loom to tie the heddles behind the beater.
- Agabel (Weaving) – the interlocking of vertical yarn (warp) known as gan-ay and the horizontal yarns (weft) as pakan.

== Production ==
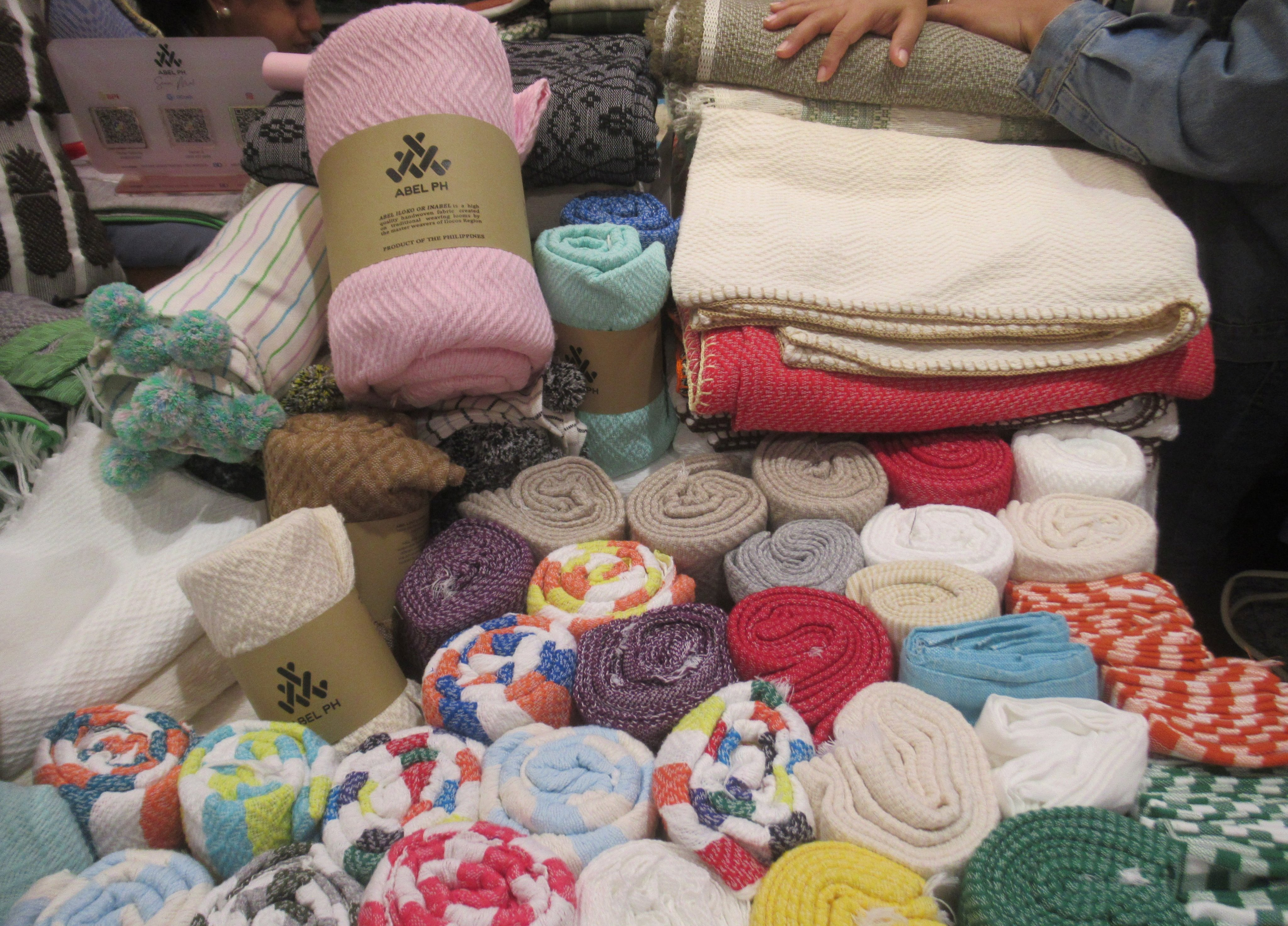

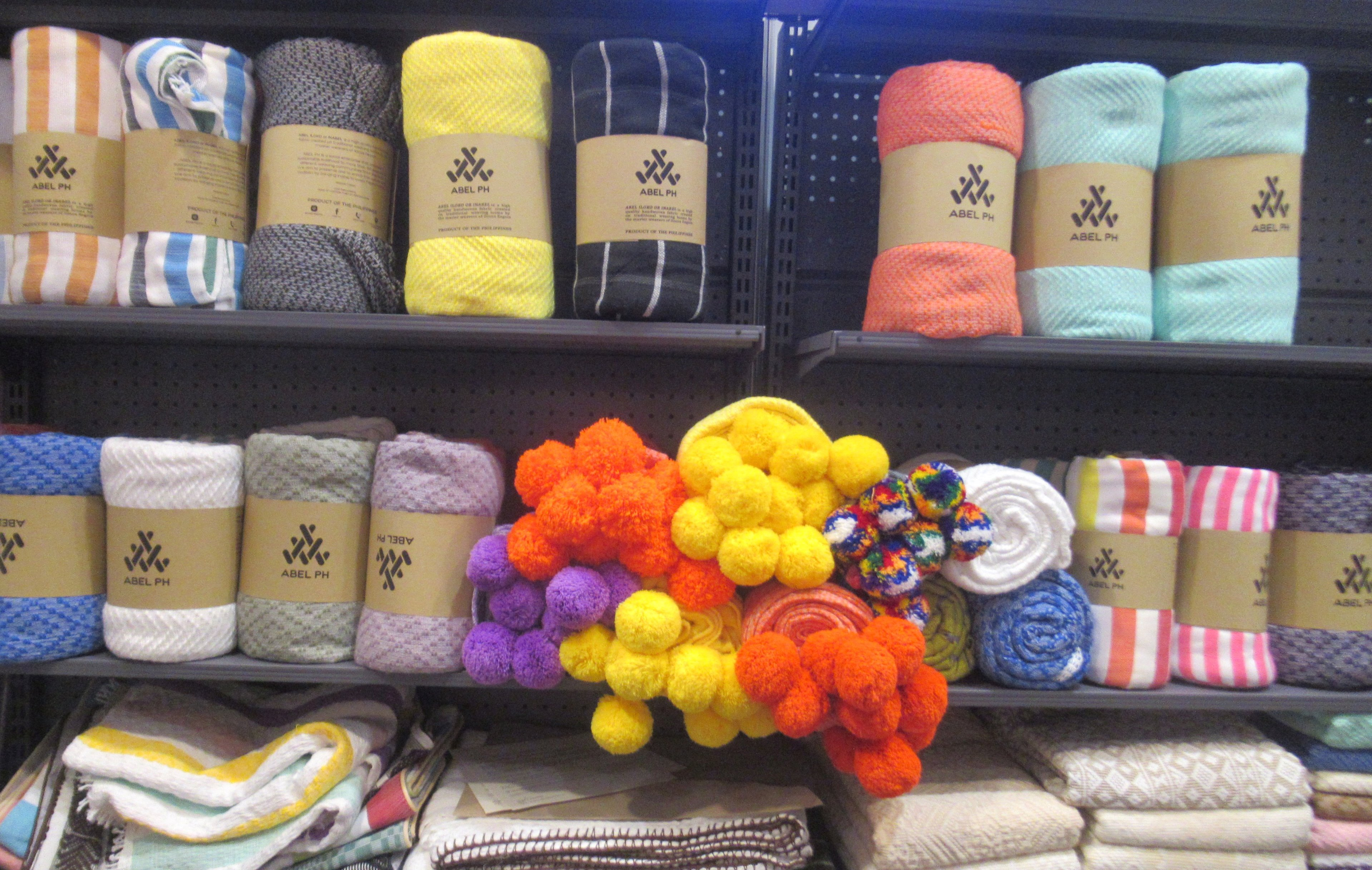
Inabel products from Candon City, Ilocos Sur, exhibited during the National Artist & Craft 2024.

Production of traditional Inabel weaving is still prevalent among Ilocano provinces and is one of its One-Town, One Product or simply known as OTOP. It includes Bangar in La Union; Candon City, Santiago, Santa, Bantay, and Vigan City in Ilocos Sur; La Paz and Bangued in Abra; and Pinili, Paoay, and Sarrat in Ilocos Norte, amidst challenges such as lack of raw materials, manpower, and advanced technology that provide mass-produced textiles.

Efforts of local government in the preservation of Inabel industry in Ilocos Sur helped the small business owners of abel and their local artisans sustain their crafts and livelihood and celebrate the Binatbatan Festival, which depicts Inabel weaving process in restoration of the practices, traditions, arts, and the crafts of the Ilocanos.

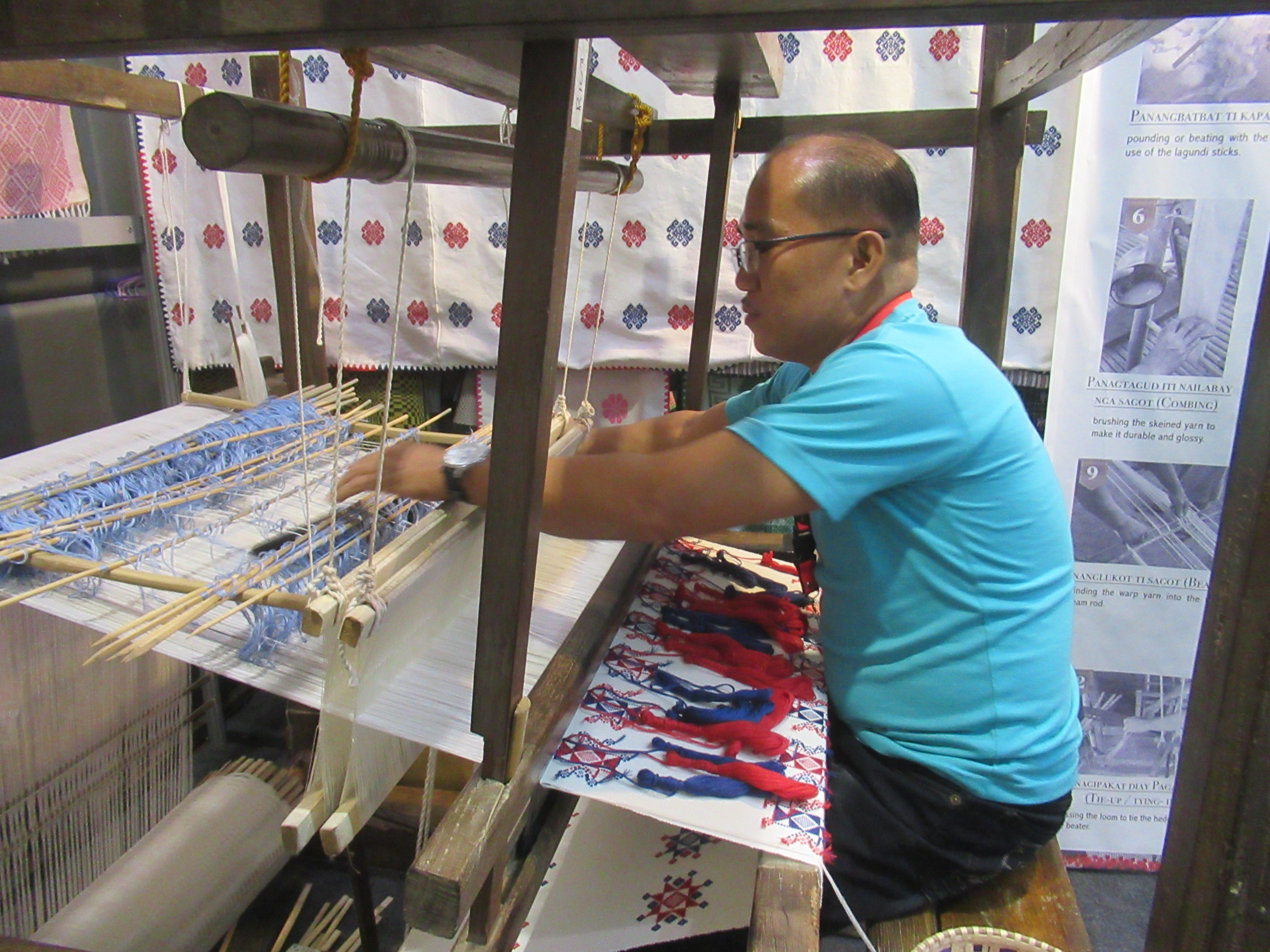

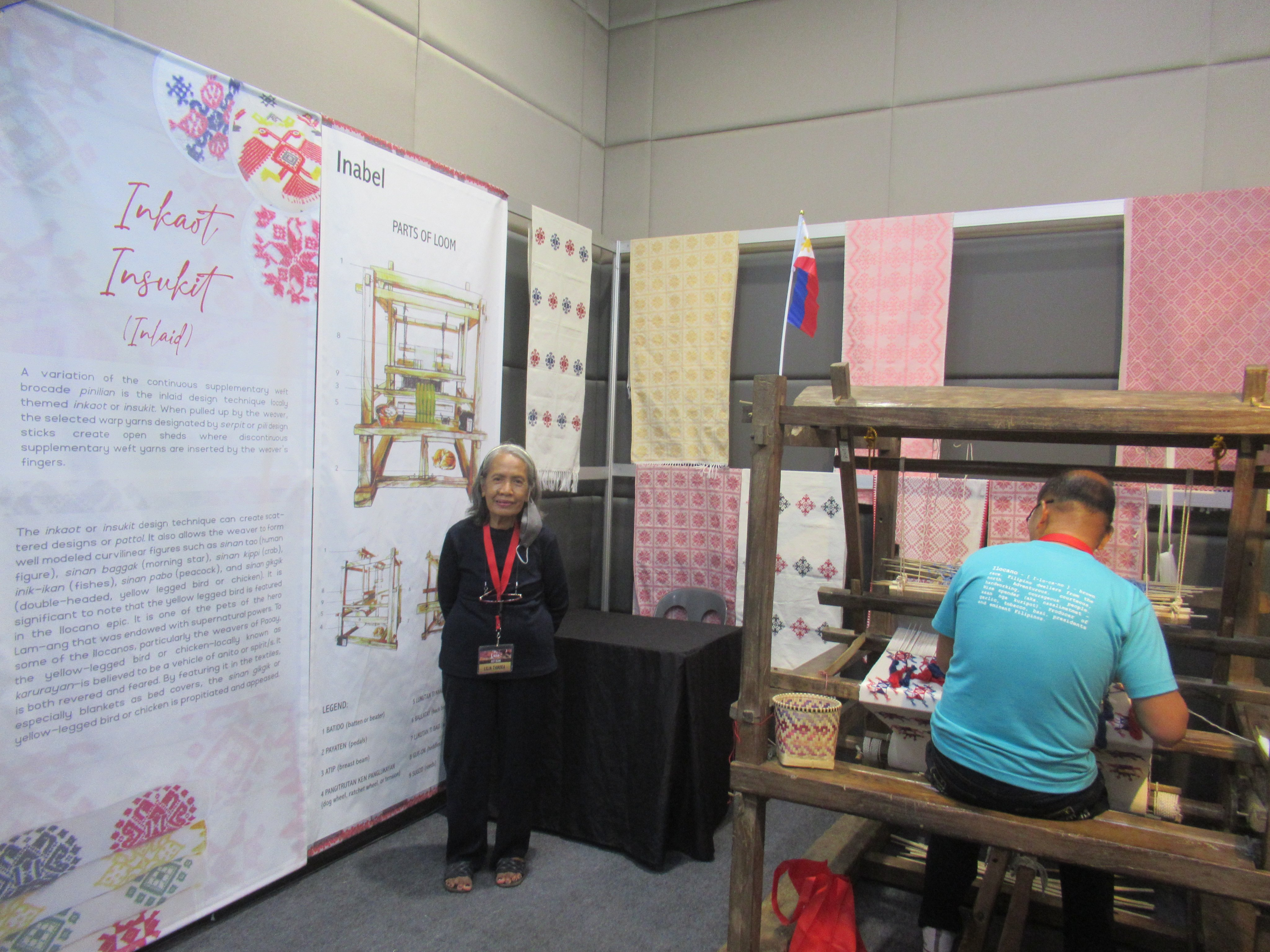
Abel-Iloco weaver-artisans showcasing their intricate craftsmanship of centuries-old tradition of Ilocano handweaving

While the provincial government of La Union has formed an organization of loom weavers in Bangar, tasked to safeguard and promote the tradition in forms of ecotourism in the province. In the town of Pinili in Ilocos Norte, the local government has been offering basic weaving courses to all interested individuals since 2018. The lessons are presided over by Magdalena Gamayo, one of the country’s National Living Treasures.

== History ==
Even before the arrival of Spanish colonizers in the 16th century, inabel weaving was already a vital aspect of Ilocano culture and daily life. The textile played an important role in pre-colonial maritime trade and barter along the Ilocos coast, which was part of a broader network of trade routes linking the region to East and Southeast Asia, as well as to the neighboring highlands of the Cordillera.

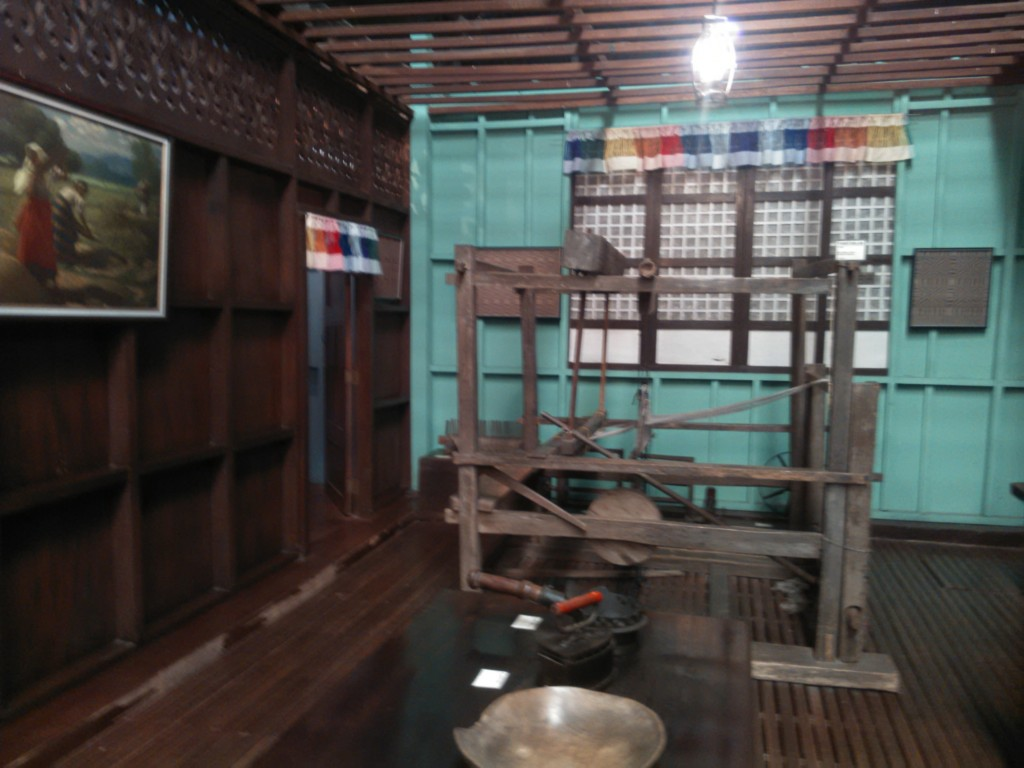
Tillar, also known as Pagablan, is a traditional wooden handloom used for weaving inabel. This device is displayed at the Museo Ilocos Norte.

Ilocano weaving traditions are deeply embedded in cultural expressions, as seen in the epic oral literature Biag ni Lam-ang. In the epic, the character Kannoyan, a young woman, is expected to be skilled in weaving inabel, a reflection of the social value placed on the craft as an essential attribute of womanhood. The narrative also mentions the use of abel in funerary practices, where the dead are wrapped in the cloth, and as a form of inheritance passed down through generations. These cultural references affirm that inabel weaving is an indigenous tradition with deep roots in the pre-colonial past of Northern Luzon.

During the Spanish colonial period, abel Iloko the traditional woven textile of the Ilocos region was highly esteemed for its exceptional quality, strength, and durability. Spanish authorities considered the cloth valuable enough to be accepted as tribute or tax payment from the Ilocanos. Due to its sturdiness, abel was even used as sailcloth for Spanish galleons navigating the Pacific. The weaving industry flourished, particularly in Vigan, where looms became a common household fixture by the 18th century.

The demand for Ilocano textiles extended beyond local markets and reached as far as Acapulco, Mexico, where products like mantas de Ylocos, described by historian Sandra Castro in her 2018 book Textiles in the Philippine Colonial Landscape as "ordinary or coarse cotton cloth" of the highest value were traded at fairs. The prominence of abel production was so significant that it posed a threat to the Spanish weaving industry, earning a reputation as a formidable local craft.

The early 20th century marked a transitional period for inabel weaving in the Ilocos region. While the 18th century saw peak demand for Ilocano textiles in European markets, and later in the late 19th and early 20th centuries for use in Katipunero uniforms and traditional clothing—most notably during the presidency of Manuel L. Quezon.

The arrival of American colonial rule brought significant challenges to the industry. As noted by scholar Norma Respicio, the influx of inexpensive imported dyed yarns and cotton under American trade policies led to a decline in demand for locally woven goods. Inabel was gradually replaced by rengue, a starched raw silk fabric embraced by women across the Philippines for blouses, reducing the prominence of abel as a premium textile.

During the Japanese occupation, inabel weaving faced near-total disruption. Japanese forces, recognizing the cultural and economic significance of the inabel, targeted and destroyed looms throughout the region, effectively halting production and instilling fear among Ilocano weavers. Despite these setbacks, the resilience of the Ilocano people ensured the survival of the craft. In the post-war years, weavers revived the tradition, introducing innovations in technique and design that carried the legacy of inabel into the modern era.

== See also ==
- Abacá
- Batik
- Piña
- Malong
- Tapis
- T'nalak
- Hablon
