= Magdalena Gamayo =

Filipino weaver

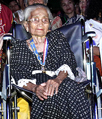
- Gamayo in 2017
- Born: August 13, 1924 (age 101)
- Known for: Textile
- Style: Ilocano traditional inabel weaving
- Awards: National Living Treasure Award; 2012

Magdalena Gamayo (born August 13, 1924) is a Filipino weaver who is a lead-practitioner of the Ilocano tradition of pinagabel.

== Background ==
Magdalena Gamayo, a native of the cotton farming Barangay of Lumbaan-Bicbica, Pinili, Ilocos Norte, learned the Ilocano weaving tradition of making inabel from her aunt at age 16. She taught herself on how to execute the traditional patterns of binakol, inuritan (geometric design), kusikos (orange-like spiral forms), and sinan-sabong (flowers). She became best known for weaving the sinan-sabong, since it is the most challenging pattern among the four.

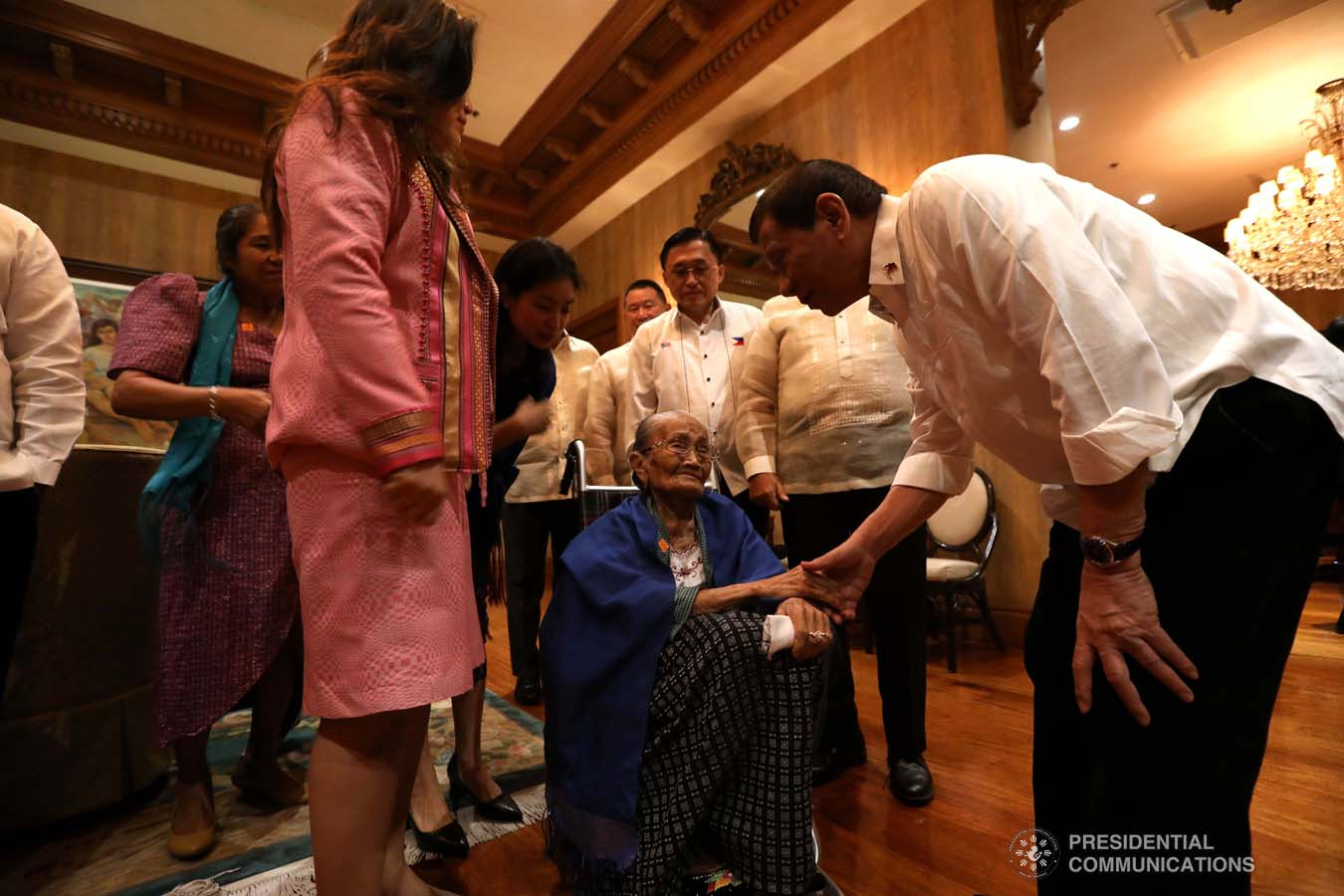
Gamayo-Rodrigo Duterte 2019

Her father bought her first loom, made by a local craftsman using sag'gat hardwood. Gamayo's loom lasted for 30 years. Already past 80 years old, Gamayo remained committed in making inabel.

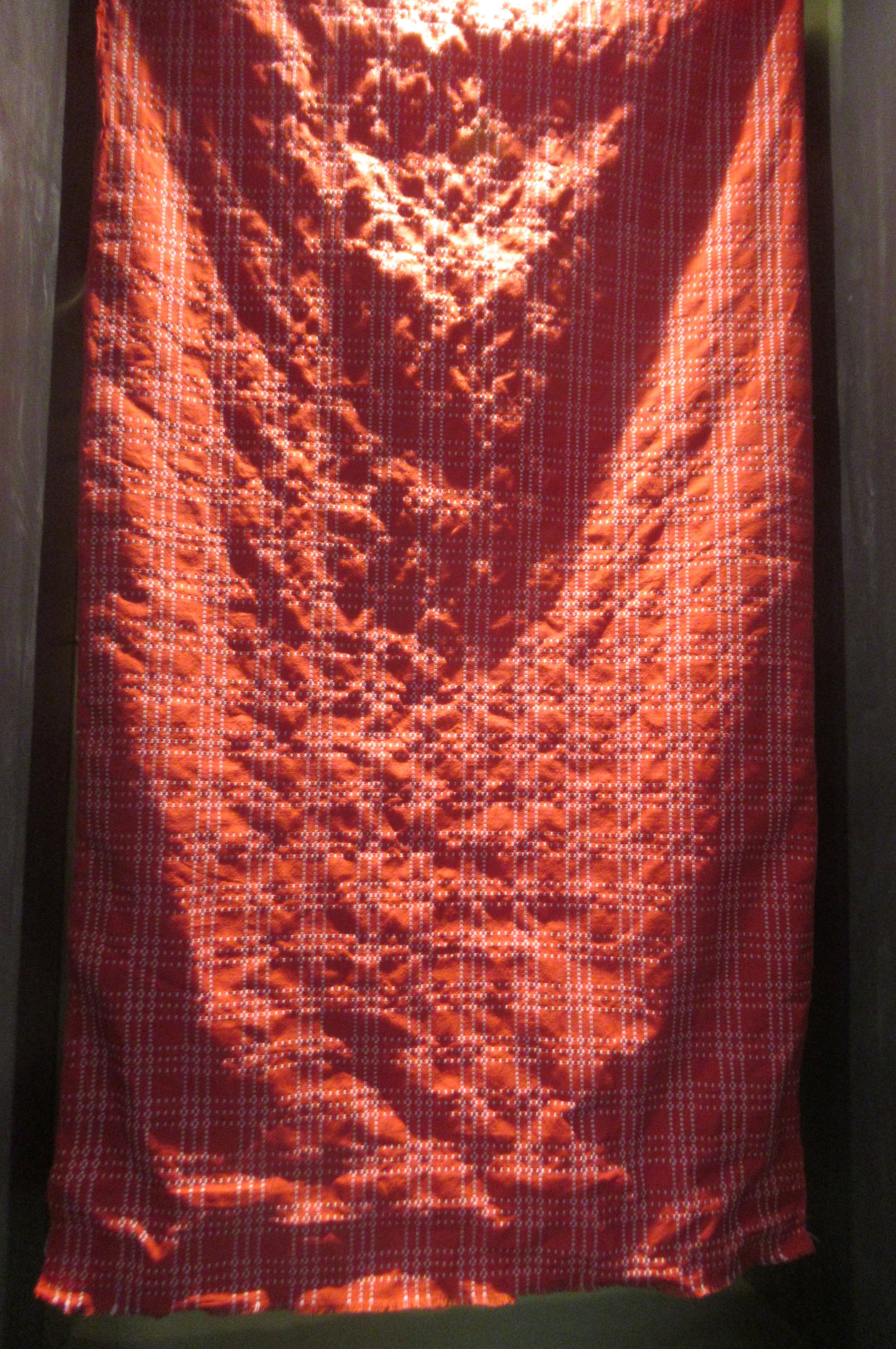
Gamayo's Pinili Inabel

On November 8, 2012, she was conferred the National Living Treasure Award, the Gawad sa Manlilikha ng Bayan under R.A. 7355 by the National Commission for Culture and the Arts and Proclamation No. 474.

In late 2016, the House of Inabel was inaugurated enabling Gamayo to further promote pinagabel.

On 13 August 2024, Gamayo turned 100 years old, becoming a centenarian. In recognition of this milestone, President Bongbong Marcos issued Proclamation No. 664, declaring 13 August 2024 to 12 August 2025 as the Centennial Year of Manlilikha ng Bayan Magdalena Gamayo.
