= Pattern glare =

Form of visual disturbance

Pattern glare is a form of visual discomfort that arises from viewing repetitively striped patterns, such as those of op art. Instead of the patterns appearing as they are, they may appear to move, shimmer, or vary in shape over time.
