= Binakael =

Weaving pattern

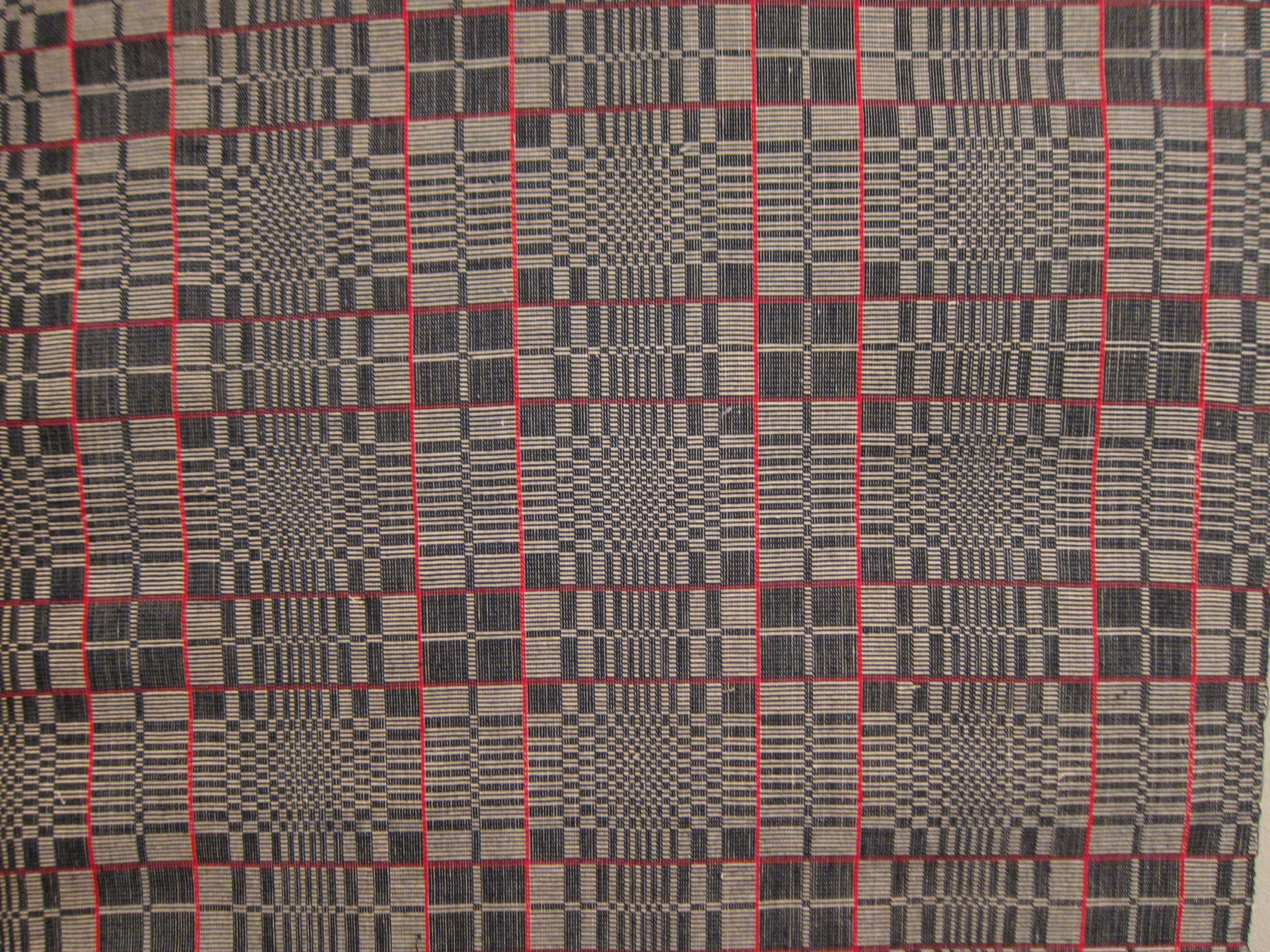
A binakol design

Binakael (binakel, binakol, binakul) (transliterated, "to do a sphere") is a type of weaving pattern traditional in the Philippines. Patterns consisting entirely of straight lines are woven so as to create the illusion of curves and volumes. A sense of motion is also sought. Designs are geometric, but often representational. The techniques create illusionistic designs similar to op art patterns and were popular by the late 19th century, when the United States colonized the Philippines and American museums collected many traditional Philippine textiles.

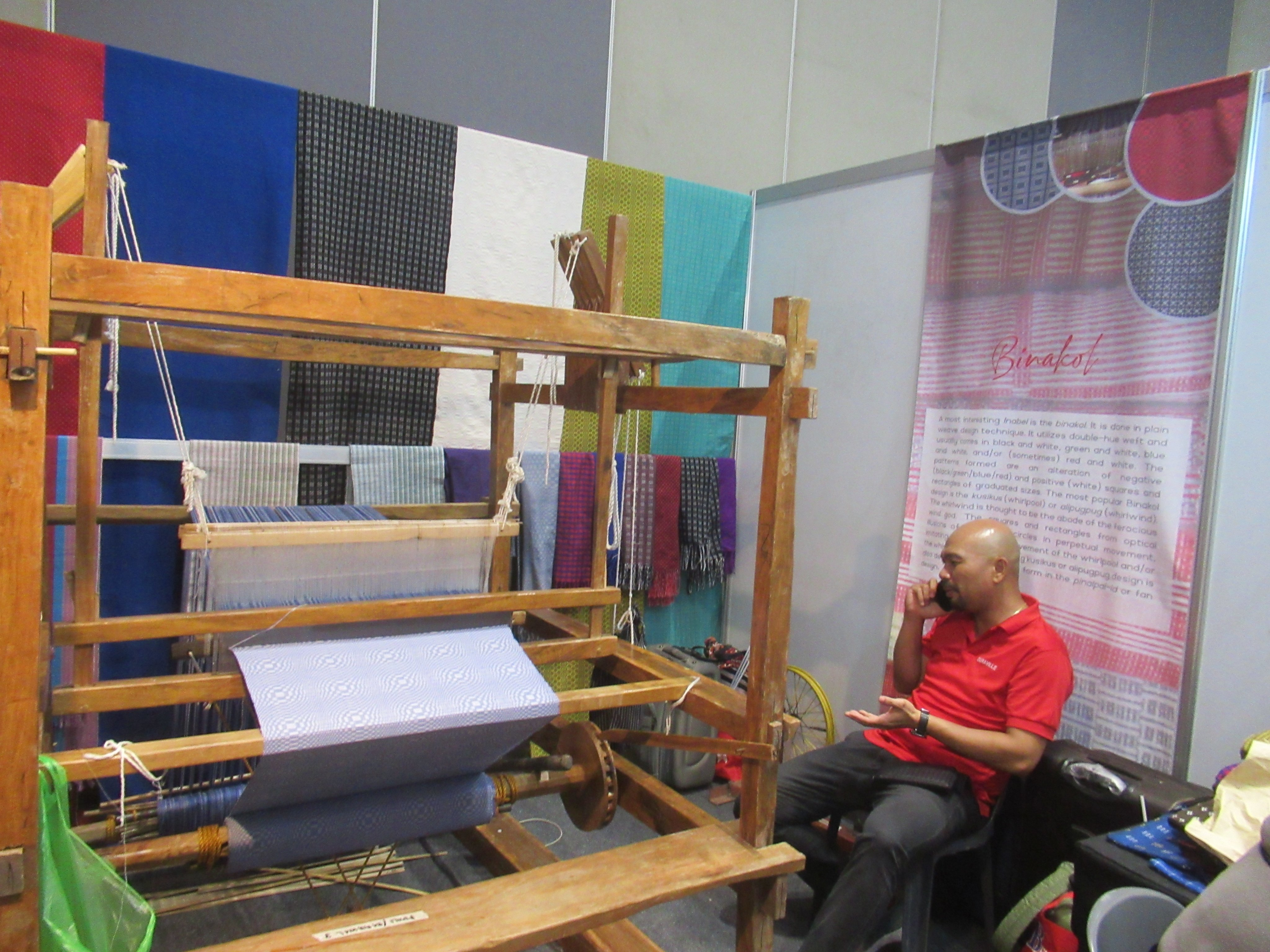
Ilocos Sur weaver

Binakael patterns may use a two-block rep weave, making them double-sided, but with colour reversal.

== In culture ==
Mara Coson's novel "Aliasing" was inspired by binakael weave.

Cebu Pacific introduced its QR Flight codes pattered after traditional weaving of nature-inspired design of Ilocos Norte's Binakol to promote local tourism.

The binakael weave is also featured on the official branding of the FIFA Futsal Women's World Cup 2025 which will be held in the Philippines.

== See also ==
- Inabel
- Op art
- T'nalak
