= Getulio Alviani =

Italian painter (1939–2018)

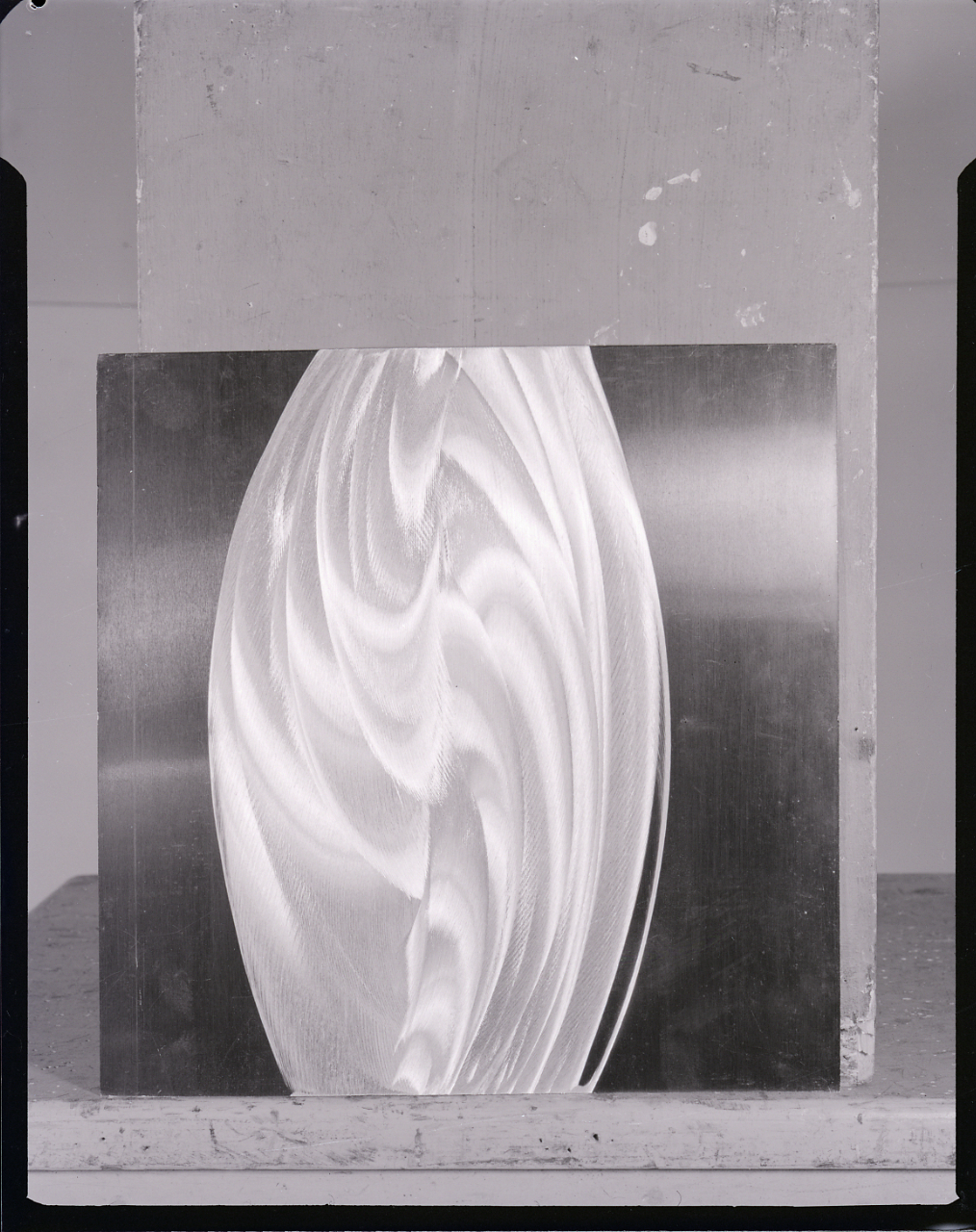
Getulio Alviani, Aluminium panels. Photo by Paolo Monti, 1963 (Fondo Paolo Monti, BEIC)

Getulio Alviani (5 September 1939 in Udine – 24 February 2018 in Milan) was an Italian artist, curator, architect and writer based in Milan. He is considered to be an important International Optical - kinetic artist.

== Life and work ==
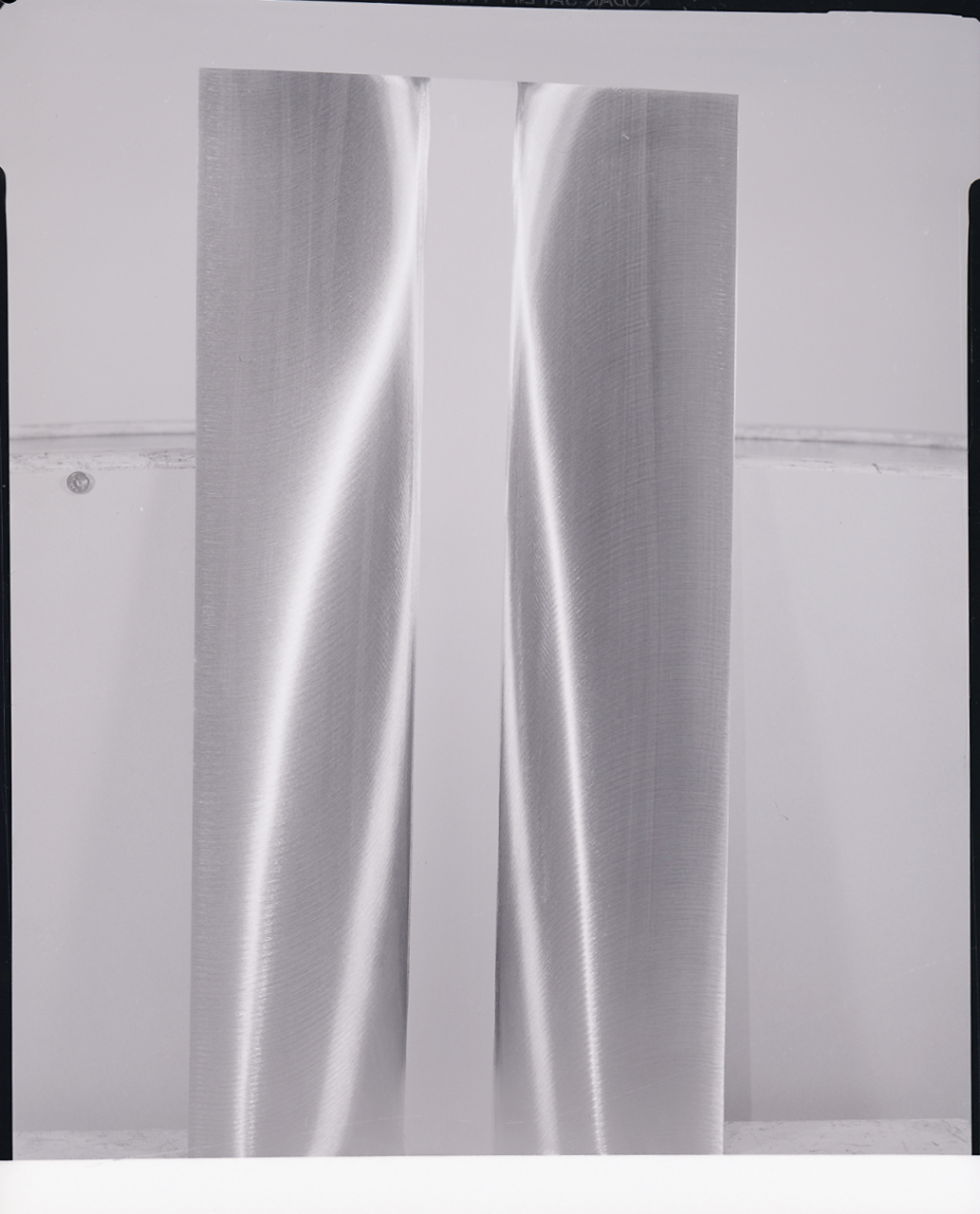
Aluminium panels. Photo by Paolo Monti, 1963 (Fondo Paolo Monti, BEIC)

Alviani was born in Udine. He showed talent for design and geometric drawing from his childhood. He enrolled in the Accademia di Belle Arti di Venezia, but soon showed little interest in his studies, spending afternoons in Venice's museums in contemplation of classical masterpieces. He also started doing small jobs for local architects, and helped local artists in inking projects such as etchings.

Alviani's first series, "The Wires", was inspired by aerial electric wires. Fascinated by some polished aluminium surfaces found in a factory in which he was working: after further polishing and abrasion, he created his landmark "Superfici a testura vibratile" (vibrating texture surfaces), winning international acclaim. In 1961 he was invited to the Zagreb exhibition "Nove Tendencije", together with other artists working along similar lines and exploring the opportunities of a dynamic art which interacts with the viewer. He started exchanging ideas with artists like Julio Le Parc, François Morellet, Ivan Picelj and Enrico Castellani, actively participating in the activities of the so-called G.R.A.V. (Groupe de Recherche d'Art Visuelle) in Paris.

In 1962 he moved to Milan, where he became friends with Piero Manzoni, Davide Boriani, Gianni Colombo and Lucio Fontana. Fontana became very interested in Alviani's work and bought some of his "surfaces". Alviani also worked with other artists like Max Bill, Bruno Munari and Josef Albers. In 1964 he was invited to show at the Venice Biennale, sharing a room with Enrico Castellani.

In 1965 Alviani took part in The Responsive Eye created by curator William C. Seitz at MoMA in New York, together with other artists associated with Kinetic and Programmed Art. During his time in New York, Alviani forged a close friendship with Kenneth Snelson. Alviani's work was purchased by MoMA and used as a poster image for the museum's next exhibition, "The New Acquisitions". In 1968 he was invited at Kassel's Documenta 4.

Throughout the 1970s he travelled to South America, and accepted, upon request of Jesús Rafael Soto, the directorship of the Jesús Soto Museum of Modern Art, Ciudad Bolívar, Venezuela. Alviani was then a curator at the Muzeum Milana Dobesa in Bratislava, from 2000 to 2010 and continued to organize many exhibitions on Optical and Kinetic Art over the years.

His work was again included in the Venice Biennale in 1984, 1986 and 1993. He also exhibited at the Milan Triennale, the Kunsthaus Graz, Palazzo delle Papesse in Siena, Academie de France in Rome, the Buenos Aires Biennale, the travelling exhibition "Light, Movement and Programming", and the Rome Quadriennale.

Alviani's works are actively traded in Italian and international modern art auctions, such as the "Italian sales" held in London by Christie's and Sotheby's. Among his works, some of the most appreciated are the "Superfici a testura variabile" where the polished aluminium reflects the light in different hues according to the angle at which they are viewed. Other popular works by Alviani are the "chromodynamic surfaces", where primary colour interactions are studied, and his "mirrors" with their illusion of rings created on reflecting metal surfaces.

Alviani edited books on the work of Josef Albers (1988) and Max Bill (2018). He also edited with Giancarlo Pauletto a book on Michel Seuphor (1987), and contributed with his photographs to a book of Pauletto and Margaret A. Miller on Richard Anuszkiewicz (1988).

== Publications ==
- Getulio Alviani, Giancarlo Pauletto, Michel Seuphor, Concordia Sette, Pordenone, 1987
- Giancarlo Pauletto, Margaret A. Miller, Richard Anuszkiewicz: Opere 1961-1987, photographs by Getulio Alviani, Centro Iniziative Culturali, Pordenone, 1988
- Getulio Alviani, Josef Albers, L'arca edizioni, Pordenone, 1988, ISBN 978-8878380011

== Literature ==
- William C. Seitz, The Responsive Eye, Museum of Modern Art, New York, 1965
- Maurizio Fagiolo dell'Arco, L'iperluce di Alviani, Bulzoni, Rome, 1964
- Umbro Apollonio, Getulio Alviani, Parco Massari, Ferrara, 1980
- Renato Barilli, L'arte Contemporanea, da Cèzanne alle ultime tendenze, Feltrinelli, Milan, 1984
- Adachiara Zevi, Peripezie del dopoguerra nell'arte Italiana, Einaudi, Turin, 2005
- Renato Barilli, Storia dell'arte contemporanea in Italia, Bollati Boringhieri, Turin, 2007
- Rachele Ferrario, Luigi Settembrini, Room with a View, Museo Palazzo Reale, Milan, 2007

== See also ==
- Abstract Art
- Kinetic Art
- Op Art

== Sources ==
- This article draws from the corresponding article in the Italian Wikipedia.
