= William C. Seitz =

American art curator (1914–1974)

William Seitz (June 14, 1914 – October 26, 1974) was an American art curator associated most closely with the Museum of Modern Art (MoMA) in New York City and known for the landmark exhibitions he curated and wrote catalogue essays for there on assemblage, "The Art of Assemblage" (the first time the term assemblage was introduced into popular parlance) and OpArt (1965's "The Responsive Eye") with his accompanying essays published in the exhibitions' catalogue.

== Biography ==
In 1955 Seitz received a PhD in modern art from Princeton University, the first person to be awarded a doctorate in that subject by the Ivy league institution. Seitz served as a curator at the MoMA for five years during the nineteen sixties where not only did he curate the groundbreaking exhibitions on assemblage and OpArt but also surveys of the works of Hans Hoffman, Claude Monet, and Mark Tobey.

After leaving his position at the MoMA Seitz was the director of the Rose Art Museum at Brandeis University. Seitz died in 1974 and in 1977 an exhibition honoring his curatorial career and legacy was mounted at the Princeton University Art Museum

== Legacy ==
Portraits of William Seitz and his wife Irma by Alice Neel today are displayed in the Princeton University Art Museum. They were donated to the museum by Neel's children.
