= Arnold Alfred Schmidt =

American painter

- Born: 1930; Plainfield, New Jersey, United States
- Died: 1993 (aged 62–63)
- Style: Optical art
- Spouse: Anita Schmidt (née Venetian)
- Children: Arnold Anthony Schmidt and Bob Schmidt

Arnold Alfred Schmidt, born in 1930 in Plainfield, New Jersey, lived most of his life in New York City. He graduated with an MA from New York's Cooper Union, and worked for years as an Art Director at the Gusso-Hyman Advertising agency on such accounts as Jonathan Logan and Misty Harbor fashions. He later became a Commercial Art teacher at New Jersey's Kearny High School. He died of cancer in 1993.

As a painter of the Op Art movement, his first solo exhibition, "Optical Paintings," opened on October 5, 1964, at the Terrain Gallery in New York, after which he exhibited a painting at the Museum of Modern Art's Responsive Eye show, which remains in MOMA's permanent collection. He exhibited "New Paintings" at the Terrain in 1965, and "Shaped Optical Paintings" in 1966, and in 1967 was one of 100 artists taking part in the Terrain's exhibition, "All Art Is for Life & Against the War in Vietnam", a benefit to aid napalm-burned children. His work has been collected by various museums, including the New Orleans Museum of Art.

Schmidt was married to Anita Schmidt (née Venetian), and had two sons, Arnold Anthony Schmidt and Bob Schmidt.
