= Reginald H. Neal =

American painter

Reginald H. Neal (1909–1992) was an American painter and graphic artist, especially a printmaker, who created op art works.

Neal was born in Leicester, England. He moved to Decatur, Illinois. He received his BA from Bradley University and his master's degree in art history from the University of Chicago in 1939. His op art works explored optical elements that produced vibrating, flickering and pulsating effects. He also taught at the Escuela de Bellas Artes in Mexico and at the Contemporaries Graphic Center in New York.

Neal participated in The Responsive Eye, (Museum of Modern Art, New York, 1965) and Optic Nerve: Perceptual Art of the 1960s (Columbus Museum of Art, Ohio, 2007).

Works by Neal are included in the collections of the Museum of Modern Art, the Library of Congress, Princeton University, the Figge Art Museum, and Brigham Young University.

He died in 1992.
