= Anonima group =

1965 Photo of Anonima group

The American artist collaborative, Anonima group, was founded in Cleveland, Ohio, in 1960 by Ernst Benkert, Francis Hewitt and Ed Mieczkowski. Propelled by their rejection of the cult of the ego and automatic style of the abstract expressionists, the artists worked collaboratively on grid-based, spatially fluctuating drawings and paintings that were precise investigations of the scientific phenomena and psychology of optical perception. The work was accompanied by writings: proposals, projects and manifestos - socialist in nature - which the artists considered essential to the experience and understanding of their work. Their drawings, paintings and writings, which had much in common with the positions of artist Ad Reinhardt, and with the Russian constructivists, were included in the 1965 Responsive Eye exhibit at the Museum of Modern Art. Along with other artists in the exhibit, Anonima's work was incorrectly relegated to what came to be the highly commercialized and publicized category of op art. A recent reconsideration and recontextualization of op art, the expansive 2006 Optic Nerve exhibit at the Columbus Museum of Art, places the Anonima as the sole American collaborative group, along with the European Zero Group, Gruppo N, GRAV and others, who were examining new optical information at that time.

Francis Hewitt, who had a master's in art and later did course work toward a PhD in the psychology of perception, provided the conceptual framework for the Anonima group; their projects addressed the latest information about the science and psychology of visual perception. Anonima's anti-commercial stance (see statement below), including their ultimate refusal to interact with the commercial art world, had the effect of removing them from the lexicon of known artists from that time. In a catalog essay for Frank Hewitt's 1992 retrospective at the Robert Hull Fleming Museum in Burlington, Vermont, William C. Lipke wrote that the artists believed that "commercialization and popularization obfuscated the real issues" being addressed by their work. Further he writes that work by Anonima is "better understood in light of the theories and data of perceptual psychology; the commitment to a systemic study of visual information irrespective of stylistic or economic pressures."

The Anonima group disbanded in 1971, but the effect of their work has extended into the present through their writing, drawings and paintings. The group's analytical and impersonal view of the creative process was balanced by a profound generosity of spirit which has influenced countless artists over the years; all three artists have had long teaching careers (Frank Hewitt died in 1992), in which they dedicated themselves to providing art students with a precise understanding of the constructs of optical perception, an invaluable foundation for any artist. Their ideas are reflected in the work of many contemporary artists.
