= Edward B. Henning =

American art historian (1922 – 1993)

Edward Burk Henning (23 October 1922 – 18 April 1993) was an American art historian who served as a chief curator at the Cleveland Museum of Art.

== Early life and education ==
Born in Cleveland, Ohio, to Marguerite and William Henning, Edward completed his education at West Technical High School. He initially trained as a stained glass apprentice before serving in the U.S. Army during World War II. Post-war, he pursued higher education in art, earning a B.S. from Western Reserve University in 1949, a certificate from the Cleveland Institute of Art the same year, and an M.S. from Western Reserve University in 1952. He also studied at the Académie Julian in Paris from 1949 to 1950.

== Career ==
Henning began his career as an art teacher in Cleveland Public Schools from 1950 to 1952. He joined the Cleveland Museum of Art in 1952, initially as an instructor in the education department, progressing to assistant curator of education by 1955, and associate curator by 1956. He served as a guest lecturer and adjunct professor at Western Reserve University from 1958 to 1984.

In 1959, Henning was appointed assistant to museum director Sherman Lee. He became the museum's first curator of contemporary art in 1962 and was promoted to curator of modern art in 1972, later becoming chief curator in 1979. During his tenure, Henning acquired works by artists such as Pablo Picasso, Jackson Pollock, and Isamu Noguchi, and organized major exhibitions.

Henning also advised private collectors, judged art shows, and served on the Art Advisory Panel to the Internal Revenue Service. He led the museum's film program until 1986 and continued his involvement with the museum as a research curator cataloging its modern art collection until his retirement in 1985.
