= Karl A. Meyer =

Swiss artist (born 1958)

Karl Andreas Meyer
- Born: July 23, 1958 (age 67); Basel
- Known for: Painting, Sculpture
- Website: karlmeyer.ch

Karl Andreas Meyer (born July 23, 1958) also known as KAM, is a Swiss painter and sculptor from Basel.

== Life and work ==
Karl A. Meyer came from a family that owned a printing business. Aware of their son's sensibilities, his parents sent Meyer to a Rudolf Steiner school, where he adopted an interest in geology and biology, as well as art and dance. He reluctantly went on to study law and business but also studied at the Basel School for Applied Art.

Karl A. Meyer began his artistic career in New York City as a 22 year old in 1980. His early works included large-scale woodcuts inspired by Hopi iconography. At this time, the East Village art movement was emerging, in which Meyer participated through exhibitions and publications. He shared a studio at Crosby 66 with Roland Hagenberg and occasionally other artists such as Claudio Knöpfli.

Since 2010, KAM has taken part in the Raiding Project, initiated by Roland Hagenberg, where he exhibited alongside artists including Hiroshi Hara, Ai Weiwei, and Terunobu Fujimori. One of his notable contributions to this project was Cloud of Humanity, an installation of 15,000 clay figurines that has been presented in several exhibitions in Austria and abroad. From this project large-scale sculptures developed, such as Birdman, which was installed in 2015 in Raiding, the birthplace of Franz Liszt.

KAM's work is characterized by large-scale woodcuts and recurring symbolic motifs. From 1986 he started painting on sheets of lead, sometimes first exposing the sheets to rain water or soft drinks, to create patterns from oxidization, and then painting on the sheets in blue-turquoise acrylic. He draws on the art of North American Indigenous cultures, particularly petroglyphs, which influenced his early woodcut works. His practice explores the function of idols as intermediaries between artist, artwork, and audience. Meyer often employs universal symbols intended to evoke associations across cultural contexts. Repetition of figures and symbols forms a central element in his woodcuts and drawings. According to Meyer, the significance of his work lies in direct aesthetic experience rather than analytical interpretation.

KAM has traveled extensively in the United States, particularly New Mexico, Arizona, and Utah, to study Indigenous culture and philosophies. These influences contributed to the development of his artistic perspective. Later, his work was shaped by experiences in the Babilônia favela in Rio de Janeiro, where he engaged with the local community. During this period, he produced the Kaleidoscope Rio project, which combined photography with social themes, documenting everyday life in the favela and exploring social and cultural contrasts.

== Selected Exhibitions ==
=== Solo Exhibitions ===
- 1987: Karl A. Meyer Works, Littmann Gallery, Basel
- 1987: Karl A. Meyer – Bilder, Zeichnungen und persische Miniaturen, Ittingen Charterhouse, Canton of Thurgau, Switzerland
- 1988: Karl A. Meyer, Not Vital. Swiss Institute Contemporary Art New York
- 2013: Hiroshi Hara and Karl A. Meyer, Raiding Project, Raiding, Austria
- 2014: Birdman, Installation, Raiding Foundation, Austria
- 2014: Africa, 5000 clay ships, Raiding Foundation, Austria
- 2016: Ein Schiff wird kommen, Installation, Raiding Foundation, Austria
- 2018: Favela Portraits, Polaroid Exhibition in Rio de Janeiro
- 2024: RIO Love an Life in Times of Executions – Favela Portraits (Art Miami) Licht Feld Gallery, Basel
- 2025: Koyaanisqatsi – Hopi: Life out of Balance, filter4, Basel

=== Group exhibitions ===
- 1984: Large Works, with Edward Brezinski, Roni Horn, Hunt Slonem and others, Brabara Braathen Gallery, New York
- 1985: East Village Funktional, with Kenny Scharf, Rhonda Zwillinger, Mark Kostabi and others, Rosa Esman Gallery, New York
- 1985: Art against AIDS, with Arman, Christo, Mark DiSuvero, Tom Butter and others, Rosa Esman Gallery, New York
- 1986: Children's Coloring Book Drawings for UNICEF, group exhibition with Keith Haring, Richard Serra, Tom Wesselmann, Christo, Richard Hambleton and others, Phyllis Kind Gallery, New York
- 1986: Artists of Barbara Braathen Gallery, with Donald Lipski, Ed Brezinski, Hunt Slonem and others, The Limelight, New York
- 1987: Multiple Visions – East Village Artists, with Rhonda Wall, Philip Pocock, Rick Prol, Paul Benny, Richard Hambleton and others, Art Now Gallery, Gothenbourg
- 2001: Lichtfeld 1, 30 Artistic Positions, Central Switzerland Platform for Contemporary Art, Sulzer-Burckhardt-Areal Gundeldinger Feld, Basel
- 2001: Holzschnitt heute, Mühlestall Allschwil, Switzerland
- 2003: Licht Feld 3, Gundeldinger Feld, Basel, Switzerland
- 2004: Licht Feld 4: Kunst aus der Schweiz, Deutschland und Österreich, Basel, Switzerland
- 2013: Biennale Licht Feld, Basel, Switzerland
- 2013: Kunstfabrik Groß Siegharts, Wien, Austria

== Selected Publications ==
- Hagenberg, Roland, ed. (1986). Happy Happy – A childrens' coloring book by contemporary artists. New York: Egret Publications. p. 15.
- Hagenberg, Roland; Meyer, Karl A., eds. (2013). RIO – Love and Life in Times of Executions. Polaroids and Poems. Berlin: Art In Flow. ISBN 978-3-938457-45-0.
- Hagenberg, Roland; Meyer, Terunobu; Fujimori, Karl A.; Hara, Hiroshi, eds. (2019). Raiding Project - Ten Fabulous Years. Berlin: Art In Flow. ISBN 978-3-938457-46-7.
- Hagenberg, Roland; Meyer, Karl A., eds. (2022). Crosby Street. Berlin: Art In Flow. ISBN 978-3-938457-47-4.
