= List of Gleat events =

The following events have been held and scheduled by Gleat, a professional wrestling and mixed martial arts promotion based in Japan. Gleat's inaugural event, Gleat Ver.0, took place on October 15, 2020.

== Overview ==
Most Gleat events are divided into three brands:

- "G Prowrestling" events feature traditional puroresu matches, with some exceptions
- "Lidet UWF" events feature UWFi-inspired shoot-style wrestling matches
- "Gleat MMA" events feature martial arts bouts, including MMA, kickboxing and submission grappling

Numbered "Gleat Ver." events air bigger cards featuring a mix of the three brands. Specials events such as "Gleat Ver.EX", "Gleat Ver.Mega" and "Gleat Ver.&" are held in larger venues and usually feature wrestlers from other wrestling promotions such as All Japan Pro Wrestling (AJPW), Big Japan Pro Wrestling (BJW) or Pro Wrestling Freedoms. These events air live on Gleat's YouTube channel. Furthermore, Gleat holds house shows titled "Gleat House Show" that are not broadcast.

=== Other events ===
Between December 3, 2020, and July 29, 2021, Gleat taped individual matches held without an audience at the GEN Sports Palace, in Tokyo. Those matches aired on Gleat's YouTube channel, making up seven episodes of the "Experimental Matches" series.

On April 16, 2023, Lidet Entertainment produced "Puro Negro", an event focused on Black Generation International, the Japanese branch of the Mexican stable Black Generation. The event, featuring wrestlers from both the Japanese and Mexican sides, is not considered part of the main Gleat events series. On January 25, 2024, a second edition titled "Puro Negro 2024" was held at the Tokyo FM Hall.

== Scheduled events ==
#	Event	Date	Venue	Location	Notes
143	GLEAT G PROWRESTLING Ver.93	August 21, 2025	Tokyo City Hall & Gallery Gotanda	Tokyo, Japan	
142	LIDET UWF Ver.6	August 9, 2025	Shin-Kiba 1st Ring	Tokyo, Japan	
141	GLEAT G PROWRESTLING Ver.92 ～ SHINJUKU FACE 20th Anniversary ～	July 24, 2025	Shinjuku FACE	Tokyo, Japan	
140	GLEAT G PROWRESTLING Ver.91	July 13, 2025	Umeda Sky Building Stella Hall	Osaka, Japan	

== Events ==
=== Gleat branded events ===
#	Event	Date	Venue	Location	Attendance	Notes	Ref.
139	Gleat Ver.19: 4th Anniversary Special Event	July 1, 2025	Tokyo City Hall & Gallery Gotanda	Tokyo, Japan			
138	Gleat Ver.18	June 14, 2025	Edion Arena Osaka	Osaka, Japan			
137	Gleat Ver.17	June 1, 2025	Korakuen Hall	Tokyo, Japan			
136	GLEAT Direct Impact On Kobe! Cima Is Back in the Kobe	May 25, 2025	Kobe Sambo Hall	Kobe, Hyogo, Japan		Aired on May 26, 2025	
135	G Prowrestling Ver.90	May 18, 2025	Imaike Gas Hall	Nagoya, Aichi, Japan			
134	Gleat House Show in Yokohama	May 17, 2025	Yokohama Radiant Hall	Yokohama, Kanagawa, Japan			
133	Gleat T-Hawk Show: T-Hawk Homecoming	May 11, 2025	Abros Yashiro Sports Center	Tomakomai, Hokkaido, Japan		Aired on May 13, 2025	
132	G Prowrestling Ver.89	April 26, 2025	Tokyo City Hall & Gallery Gotanda	Tokyo, Japan		Aired on April 30, 2025	
131	G Prowrestling Ver.88	April 19, 2025	Ogimachi Museum Cube CUBE01	Osaka, Japan			
130	Gleat House Show in Yokohama	April 5, 2025	Yokohama Radiant Hall	Yokohama, Kanagawa, Japan			
129	G Prowrestling Ver.87	March 20, 2025	Tokyo City Hall & Gallery Gotanda	Osaka, Japan			
128	G Prowrestling Ver.86	March 18, 2025	Umeda Sky Building Stella Hall	Osaka, Japan			
127	Gleat Ver.16	February 22, 2025	Korakuen Hall	Tokyo, Japan			
126	Gleat Hawk Show: Ryo Aitaka Triumphant Local Return	February 16, 2025	Granship Shizuoka Exchange Hall	Shizuoka, Japan			
125	G Prowrestling Ver.85: Special Program – Gleat Ver.& Gleat×DDT	February 15, 2025	Umeda Sky Building Stella Hall	Osaka, Japan		Co-produced with DDT Pro-Wrestling	
124	Gleat House Show in Sayama	February 3, 2025	Sayama City Community Center	Sayama, Saitama, Japan			
123	G Prowrestling Ver.84	January 26, 2025	Diamond Hall	Nagoya, Aichi, Japan			
122	G-Rush	January 24, 2025	Shinjuku Face	Tokyo, Japan			
121	G Prowrestling Ver.83	January 19, 2025	Tokyo Dome City Hall	Tokyo, Japan			
120	Gleat Ver.15	January 11, 2025	Edion Arena Osaka	Osaka, Japan			
119	Gleat Ver.14	December 30, 2024	Tokyo Dome City Hall	Tokyo, Japan			
118	G Prowrestling Ver.82: 2024 Osaka Final!!	December 15, 2024	Umeda Sky Building Stella Hall	Osaka, Japan		Aired on December 18, 2024	
117	Gleat House Show in Kyoto: 2024 Kyoto Final!!	December 14, 2024	Hulic Hall Kyoto	Kyoto, Japan			
116	Gleat House Show in Yokohama	December 23, 2024	Yokohama Radiant Hall	Yokohama, Kanagawa, Japan			
115	Gleat Ver.13: 2024 Fukuoka Final!!	November 17, 2024	Nishitetsu Hall	Fukuoka, Japan		Aired on November 20, 2024	
114	G Prowrestling Ver.81	November 13, 2024	Shinjuku Face	Tokyo, Japan		Aired on November 15, 2024	
113	G Prowrestling Ver.80	November 10, 2024	Umeda Sky Building Stella Hall	Osaka, Japan		Aired on November 12, 2024	
112	Gleat House Show in Sendai	October 27, 2024	Guriri Hall	Sendai, Miyagi, Japan			
111	Gleat Ver.EX: Gleat vs Kyōteki	October 9, 2024	Korakuen Hall	Tokyo, Japan			
110	Gleat Ver.Mega in Osaka	October 6, 2024	Edion Arena Osaka	Osaka, Japan			
109	G Prowrestling Ver.79: 2024 Nagoya Final!!	September 29, 2024	Diamond Hall	Nagoya, Aichi, Japan	277	Aired on October 2, 2024	
108	G Prowrestling Ver.78	September 25, 2024	Shinjuku Face	Tokyo, Japan	248		
107	G Prowrestling Ver.77	September 22, 2024	Umeda Sky Building Stella Hall	Osaka, Japan	227	Aired on September 24, 2024	
106	G Prowrestling Ver.76	August 25, 2024	Umeda Sky Building Stella Hall	Osaka, Japan	222	Aired on August 28, 2024	
105	Gleat Premium House Show in Korakuen Hall	August 21, 2024	Korakuen Hall	Tokyo, Japan	702		
104	G Prowrestling Ver.74	July 15, 2024	Umeda Sky Building Stella Hall	Osaka, Japan	237	Aired on July 18, 2024	
103	Gleat Ver.12	July 1, 2024	Tokyo Dome City Hall	Tokyo, Japan	1,511		
102	G Prowrestling Ver.73: Kaz Hayashi Retirement Road in Osaka	June 23, 2024	Umeda Sky Building Stella Hall	Osaka, Japan	262		
101	Gleat Ver.EX: Kaz Hayashi Retirement Road in Nagoya	June 9, 2024	Nagoya Congress Center	Nagoya, Aichi, Japan	832		
100	Gleat Ver.&: Gleat×DDT	June 6, 2024	Korakuen Hall	Tokyo, Japan	725	Co-produced with DDT Pro-Wrestling	
99	Gleat Ver.11: Kaz Hayashi Retirement Road in Fukuoka	May 26, 2024	Nishitetsu Hall	Fukuoka, Japan	332	Aired on May 29, 2024	
98	G Prowrestling Ver.72	May 19, 2024	Umeda Sky Building Stella Hall	Osaka, Japan	263		
97	Gleat House Show in Yokohama	May 4, 2024	Yokohama Radiant Hall	Yokohama, Kanagawa, Japan	265		
95	G Prowrestling Ver.71	April 4, 2024	Shinjuku Face	Tokyo, Japan	343		
94	Gleat House Show Ver.1	March 17, 2024	Hulic Hall Kyoto	Kyoto, Japan	163		
93	G Prowrestling Ver.70	March 16, 2024	Umeda Sky Building Stella Hall	Osaka, Japan	223	Aired on March 21, 2024	
92	Gleat Ver.10	March 13, 2024	Korakuen Hall	Tokyo, Japan	598		
91	Gleat Ver.9	February 23, 2024	Edion Arena Osaka	Osaka, Japan	456	Aired on February 28, 2024	
90	G Prowrestling Ver.69	February 2, 2024	Shinjuku Face	Tokyo, Japan	257		
89	G Prowrestling Ver.68	January 28, 2024	Diamond Hall	Nagoya, Aichi, Japan	375	Aired on January 31, 2024	
88	Gleat Ver.8	January 21, 2024	Edion Arena Osaka	Osaka, Japan	553	Aired on January 24, 2024	
87	Gleat Ver.7	December 30, 2023	Tokyo Dome City Hall	Tokyo, Japan	1,507		
86	G Prowrestling Ver.67	December 24, 2023	Umeda Sky Building Stella Hall	Osaka, Japan	260		
85	Gleat Ver.EX "Face-Off" Access 2 TDCH	December 10, 2023	Shinjuku Face	Tokyo, Japan	226		
84	G Prowrestling Ver.66: Burn Your Heart	November 23, 2023	Yokohama Radiant Hall	Yokohama, Kanagawa, Japan	159		
83	G Prowrestling Ver.65: Burn Your Heart	November 18, 2023	Nishitetsu Hall	Fukuoka, Japan	312		
82	G Prowrestling Ver.64: Burn Your Heart	November 12, 2023	Umeda Sky Building Stella Hall	Osaka, Japan	241		
81	G Prowrestling Ver.63: Burn Your Heart	November 3, 2023	Tokyo FM Hall	Tokyo, Japan	230		
80	G Prowrestling Ver.62: Burn Your Heart	October 21, 2023	Umeda Sky Building Stella Hall	Osaka, Japan	203		
79	Gleat Ver.EX "Gleat vs Kyōteki"	October 9, 2023	Korakuen Hall	Tokyo, Japan	729		
78	G Prowrestling Ver.61: Max Voltage	September 24, 2023	Diamond Hall	Nagoya, Aichi, Japan	293		
77	G Prowrestling Ver.60: Max Voltage	September 20, 2023	Shinjuku Face	Tokyo, Japan	359		
76	G Prowrestling Ver.59: Max Voltage	September 17, 2023	Sapporo ii-one Stadium	Sapporo, Hokkaido, Japan	256		
75	G Prowrestling Ver.58: Max Voltage	September 9, 2023	Umeda Sky Building Stella Hall	Osaka, Japan	238		
74	Gleat Ver.&: Gleat×All Japan Pro Wrestling – Life is a Challenge	August 23, 2023	Korakuen Hall	Tokyo, Japan	692	Co-produced with All Japan Pro Wrestling	
73	G Prowrestling Ver.57	August 13, 2023	Umeda Sky Building Stella Hall	Osaka, Japan	197		
72	Gleat Ver.Mega	August 4, 2023	Ryōgoku Kokugikan	Tokyo, Japan	2,215		
71	G Prowrestling Ver.56	July 16, 2023	Umeda Sky Building Stella Hall	Osaka, Japan	244		
70	Gleat Ver.6: 2nd Anniversary Show	July 1, 2023	Tokyo Dome City Hall	Tokyo, Japan	1,279		
69	G Prowrestling Ver.55: Just Before the TDCH	June 24, 2023	Nishitetsu Hall	Fukuoka, Japan	311		
68	G Prowrestling Ver.54: Just Before the TDCH	June 17, 2023	Umeda Sky Building Stella Hall	Osaka, Japan	247		
67	Gleat Ver.EX "Face-Off" Access 2 TDCH	June 7, 2023	Korakuen Hall	Tokyo, Japan	732		
66	G Prowrestling Ver.53	May 21, 2023	Umeda Sky Building Stella Hall	Osaka, Japan	233		
65	G Prowrestling Ver.52	May 14, 2023	Sapporo ii-one Stadium	Sapporo, Hokkaido, Japan	278		
64	G Prowrestling Ver.51	May 6, 2023	Shinjuku Face	Tokyo, Japan	319		
63	G Prowrestling Ver.50	April 23, 2023	Azalea Taisho Hall	Osaka, Japan	188		
62	G Prowrestling Ver.49: Invader (Shinryakusha)	April 12, 2023	Korakuen Hall	Tokyo, Japan	707		
61	G Prowrestling Ver.48	April 2, 2023	Tenbusu Hall	Naha, Okinawa, Japan	115		
60	G Prowrestling Ver.47	March 21, 2023	Gorilla Hall Osaka	Osaka, Japan	372		
59	G Prowrestling Ver.46: Origin (Genten)	March 15, 2023	Shinjuku Face	Tokyo, Japan	303		
57	G Prowrestling Ver.45: Origin (Genten)	February 23, 2023	Naka Sports Center	Nagoya, Aichi, Japan	385		
56	G Prowrestling Ver.44: Origin (Genten)	February 15, 2023	Shinjuku Face	Tokyo, Japan	385		
55	G Prowrestling Ver.43: Origin (Genten)	February 12, 2023	Azalea Taisho Hall	Osaka, Japan	188		
54	G Prowrestling Ver.42: Origin (Genten)	January 18, 2023	Shinjuku Face	Tokyo, Japan	295		
53	Gleat Ver.5	January 8, 2023	Edion Arena Osaka	Osaka, Japan	502		
52	Gleat Ver.4	December 30, 2022	Tokyo Dome City Hall	Tokyo, Japan	1,051		
51	G Prowrestling Ver.41	December 18, 2022	Umeda Sky Building Stella Hall	Osaka, Japan	285		
50	G Prowrestling Ver.40	November 27, 2022	Umeda Sky Building Stella Hall	Osaka, Japan	225		
49	G Prowrestling Ver.39	November 23, 2022	Korakuen Hall	Tokyo, Japan	761		
48	G Prowrestling Ver.38	November 19, 2022	Nishitetsu Hall	Fukuoka, Japan	302		
47	G Prowrestling Ver.37	October 30, 2022	Sapporo ii-one Stadium	Sapporo, Hokkaido, Japan	277		
46	G Prowrestling Ver.36	October 22, 2022	Umeda Sky Building Stella Hall	Osaka, Japan	265		
45	Gleat Ver.EX (Extra)	October 9, 2022	Korakuen Hall	Tokyo, Japan	1,025		
44	G Prowrestling Ver.35	September 25, 2022	Diamond Hall	Nagoya, Aichi, Japan	314		
—	G Prowrestling Ver.34	September 18, 2022	Tenbusu Hall	Naha, Okinawa, Japan	Canceled		
43	G Prowrestling Ver.33	September 10, 2022	Yokohama Radiant Hall	Yokohama, Kanagawa, Japan	189		
42	G Prowrestling Ver.32	September 4, 2022	Umeda Sky Building Stella Hall	Osaka, Japan	253		
41	G Prowrestling Ver.31	August 24, 2022	Korakuen Hall	Tokyo, Japan	723		
40	G Prowrestling Ver.30	August 20, 2022	Umeda Sky Building Stella Hall	Osaka, Japan	279		
39	G Prowrestling Ver.29	July 17, 2022	Umeda Sky Building Stella Hall	Osaka, Japan	305		
38	Gleat Ver.3: 1st Anniversary Show	July 1, 2022	Tokyo Dome City Hall	Tokyo, Japan	1,250		
37	G Prowrestling Ver.28	June 19, 2022	Sapporo ii-one Stadium	Sapporo, Hokkaido, Japan	253		
36	G Prowrestling Ver.27	June 11, 2022	Umeda Sky Building Stella Hall	Osaka, Japan	225		
35	Access 2 TDCH "Face-Off"	June 5, 2022	Shin-Kiba 1st Ring	Tokyo, Japan	202		
34	G Prowrestling Ver.26	May 22, 2022	Tenbusu Hall	Naha, Okinawa, Japan	140		
33	G Prowrestling Ver.25	May 18, 2022	Korakuen Hall	Tokyo, Japan	695		
32	G Prowrestling Ver.24	May 3, 2022	Umeda Sky Building Stella Hall	Osaka, Japan	218		
31	G Prowrestling Ver.23	April 20, 2022	Shinjuku Face	Tokyo, Japan	273		
30	G Prowrestling Ver.22	April 16, 2022	Nishitetsu Hall	Fukuoka, Japan	238		
29	G Prowrestling Ver.21	April 9, 2022	Azalea Taisho Hall	Osaka, Japan	145		
28	G Prowrestling Ver.20	March 23, 2022	Shinjuku Face	Tokyo, Japan	258		
27	G Prowrestling Ver.19	March 13, 2022	Azalea Taisho Hall	Osaka, Japan	145		
25	G Prowrestling Ver.18	February 22, 2022	Korakuen Hall	Tokyo, Japan	462		
24	G Prowrestling Ver.17	February 11, 2022	Nakamura Sports Center	Nagoya, Aichi, Japan	195		
23	G Prowrestling Ver.16	February 6, 2022	Umeda Sky Building Stella Hall	Osaka, Japan	265	Aired on February 10, 2022	
22	G Prowrestling Ver.15	January 26, 2022	Shinjuku Face	Tokyo, Japan	255		
21	Gleat Ver.2	December 30, 2021	Tokyo Dome City Hall	Tokyo, Japan	803		
20	G Prowrestling Ver.14	December 18, 2021	Umeda Sky Building Stella Hall	Osaka, Japan	225	Aired on December 23, 2021	
19	G Prowrestling Ver.13	December 11, 2021	Sapporo ii-one Stadium	Sapporo, Hokkaido, Japan	285	Aired on December 16, 2021	
18	G Prowrestling Ver.12	December 8, 2021	Shinjuku Face	Tokyo, Japan	275		
17	G Prowrestling Ver.11	November 27, 2021	Nishitetsu Hall	Fukuoka, Japan	233	Aired on December 2, 2021	
16	G Prowrestling Ver.10	November 18, 2021	Basement Monstar Oji	Tokyo, Japan	0		
—	G Prowrestling Ver.10	November 14, 2021	Colega Studio	Osaka, Japan	Canceled		
15	G Prowrestling Ver.9	November 6, 2021	Shinjuku Face	Tokyo, Japan	265		
14	G Prowrestling Ver.8	October 23, 2021	Azalea Taisho Hall	Osaka, Japan	140	Aired on October 27, 2021	
13	G Prowrestling Ver.7	October 16, 2021	Yokohama Radiant Hall	Yokohama, Kanagawa, Japan	150		
11	G Prowrestling Ver.6	September 29, 2021	Shinjuku Face	Tokyo, Japan	244		
10	G Prowrestling Ver.5	September 20, 2021	Nakamura Sports Center	Nagoya, Aichi, Japan	230	Aired on September 29, 2021	
—	G Prowrestling Ver.4	September 11, 2021	Azalea Taisho Hall	Osaka, Japan	Canceled		
9	G Prowrestling Ver.3	September 1, 2021	Shinjuku Face	Tokyo, Japan	244		
8	G Prowrestling Ver.2	August 4, 2021	Shinjuku Face	Tokyo, Japan	244		
7	G Prowrestling Ver.1	July 25, 2021	Azalea Taisho Hall	Osaka, Japan	140		
6	Gleat Ver.1	July 1, 2021	Tokyo Dome City Hall	Tokyo, Japan	1,000		
5	Access 2 TDCH "Face-Off"	June 14, 2021	Basement Monstar Oji	Tokyo, Japan	—N/a		
3	G Prowrestling Ver.0	May 26, 2021	Shinjuku Face	Tokyo, Japan	234		
2	Gleat Fan Meeting in Sapporo	May 5, 2021	Châteraisé Gateaux Kingdom Sapporo	Sapporo, Hokkaido, Japan	308	Aired on May 10, 2021	
1	Gleat Ver.0	October 15, 2020	Korakuen Hall	Tokyo, Japan	612	Aired on October 22, 2020	

=== Gleat MMA branded events ===
#	Event	Date	Venue	Location	Attendance	Notes	Ref.
1	Gleat MMA Ver.0	December 14, 2022	Korakuen Hall	Tokyo, Japan	438		

=== Lidet UWF branded events ===
#	Event	Date	Venue	Location	Attendance	Notes	Ref.
5	Lidet UWF Ver.4	April 17, 2024	Shinjuku Face	Tokyo, Japan	228		
4	Lidet UWF Ver.3	March 7, 2023	Shinjuku Face	Tokyo, Japan	214		
3	Lidet UWF Ver.2	March 5, 2022	Shinjuku Face	Tokyo, Japan	210		
2	Lidet UWF Ver.1	October 9, 2021	Shinjuku Face	Tokyo, Japan	269		
1	Lidet UWF Ver.0	June 9, 2021	Shinjuku Face	Tokyo, Japan	234		

=== Other events ===
#	Event	Date	Venue	Location	Attendance	Notes	Ref.
3	#StrongHearts Presents Action Daimaō	April 14, 2024	Umeda Sky Building Stella Hall	Osaka, Japan	342		
2	Black Generation International Presents Puro Negro 2024	January 25, 2024	Tokyo FM Hall	Tokyo, Japan	220		
1	Black Generation International Produce "Puro Negro"	April 16, 2023	Shin-Kiba 1st Ring	Tokyo, Japan	217		
