= Volker Diehl =

German art dealer (born 1957)

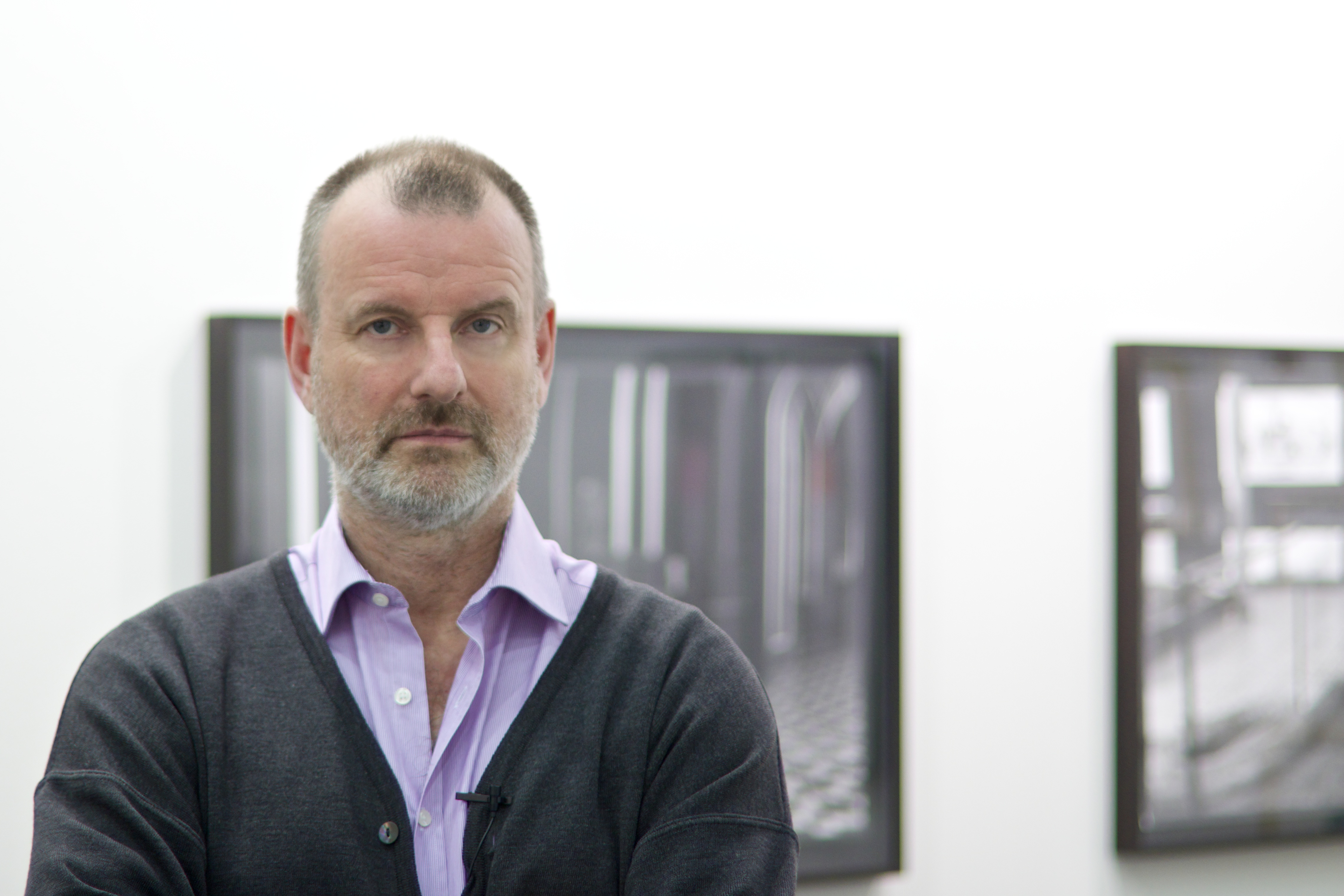
- Born: May 28, 1957; Neheim-Hüsten, West Germany
- Occupation: Gallery owner

Volker Diehl (born 28 May 1957 in Neheim-Hüsten) is a German gallery owner. He mainly exhibits contemporary art in the gallery "DIEHL" (Berlin).

== Biography and career ==
After graduating from high school in Warstein in 1977, Volker Diehl first studied at the Kunstakademie Münster under Hans-Jürgen Breuste, and from 1978 art history at the Free University of Berlin. In West Berlin, he supported various artists as part of the DAAD Artists-in-Berlin Program (including Markus Raetz, André Thomkins, Wolf Vostell, Dieter Hacker) and got to know René Block in this context. At the exhibition "Für Augen und Ohren" curated by Block, which was first shown at the Academy of Arts, Berlin, and then at the Musée d'Art Moderne de la Ville de Paris, he was also responsible for the support of artists and thus got to know Joseph Beuys, Nam June Paik, Joe Jones, and many other artists. A little later he became assistant to Shigeko Kubota and ran her studio. From 1981 to 1983 he was assistant to Christos M. Joachimides and Norman Rosenthal. In this context, he supported the artists and worked as personal assistant in the exhibition Zeitgeist (1982), which was "arguably one of the most historically significant global painting surveys of the 20th century". Together with Roland Hagenberg, he subsequently published the two books Maler in Berlin (1982) and the sequel ... Und (1983) in their own publishing house "HAPPY-HAPPY", which contained numerous interviews and portraits of artists and collectors, among them Anselm Kiefer, Georg Baselitz and Erich Marx as well as representatives of the art groups Neue Wilde and Arte Cifra. With Roland Hagenberg he traveled New York City, where they conducted interviews with Andy Warhol, Robert Mapplethorpe, Keith Haring, Francesco Clemente, Julian Schnabel, Robert Morris, Jean-Michel Basquiat, Leo Castelli, Ileana Sonnabend, Mary Boone, Tony Shafrazi, and many more. The tapes used turned out later to be defective, so the interviews were never published.

== Activities as gallery owner ==
In 1983 he began to curate exhibitions at the "Galerie Folker Skulima" in Berlin as a junior partner and showed young, contemporary artists including Jaume Plensa, Rosemarie Trockel, Leiko Ikemura, Sergey Volkov, Ray Smith and Martin Assig. In September 1990 he took over the rooms at Niebuhrstr. 2 with the founding of "Galerie Volker Diehl". In 2000 he moved to new rooms at Zimmerstr. in Berlin-Mitte, in 2007 to Lindenstraße in the Kreuzberg district. In autumn 2011 the gallery moved back to the former space at Niebuhrstraße in Berlin-Charlottenburg. In September 2013, a project space was added under the name "Diehl Cube" in Emser Straße in Berlin-Wilmersdorf, in which exhibitions were shown until 2018.

In addition, Diehl was the first western gallery owner to open its own exhibition space in Moscow under the name "Diehl + Gallery One" in April 2008. In the former premises of the state Soviet art trade at Smolenskaja No. 5/13, Diehl exhibited the works of the American artist Jenny Holzer under the title Like truth as the first project from April 17 to June 15, 2008. After other exhibitions by Wim Delvoye, Zhang Huan, Jaume Plensa and Olga Chernysheva, the Moscow branch closed again at the end of 2009.

Under the name "Diehl Projects" Diehl was responsible for further projects, first around 2000 and 2007/2008 in Berlin, later for the exhibition of the Russian artist Olga Chernysheva Adventure Istiklal N. 9 in the "Yapi Kredi Kazim Taskent Art Gallery" in Istanbul (2009) and two group exhibitions in Rostov-on-Don with the titles Berlin tut gut! and Pubblico – Privato (spring 2012).

== Other projects ==
In 1996 he and 13 other gallery owners were founding members of the art fair "art forum berlin" and, together with Rudolf Kicken, also managed the business of the company until 2001. It was internationally the first exclusively contemporary art fair and the first fair in the world to be conceived and conducted by gallery owners.

With Margarita Pushkina and Vlad Ovcharenko, he established the Russian art fair "Cosmoscow" in 2010 with an "all-inclusive concept". In 2016, together with Elena Sereda and Natalia Chagoubatova, he also founded the London pop-up company "Art Circle" (curation by Bettina Ruhrberg, among others).

== Exhibitions (selection) ==
=== 1983–1990 in Galerie Folker Skulima ===
- Georg Baselitz, 1983
- Karl Horst Hödicke, 1983
- Helmut Middendorf, 1984
- Emil Schumacher, 1984
- Christian Hasucha, 1984
- Klaus Karl Mehrkens, 1985
- Erwin Bohatsch, 1985
- Gianni Dessi, 1985
- Leiko Ikemura, 1985
- Pizzi Cannella, 1985
- Rosemarie Trockel, 1985/1986
- Erwin Bohatsch, 1986
- William Turnbull, 1987
- Gotthard Graubner, 1988
- Christian Ludwig Attersee, Errötende Tiere, 1989
- Martin Assig, 1990
- Gerhard Merz, 1990
- Gerhard Richter, Grafik und Multiples 1966–1989, 1990

=== Galerie Volker Diehl in Berlin ===
- Markus Lüpertz, 1990
- Martin Assig, 1990
- Donald Judd, 1991
- David Deutsch, 1991
- Claudia Hart, 1992
- Walter Dahn, A. R. Penck, Rosemarie Trockel, Collectiv No. 1, 1992/1993
- Angela Dwyer, Neue Bilder, 1995
- Christoph M. Gais, 1995
- Leiko Ikemura, 1995
- Group show: Magnus von Plessen, Fergus Bremner, 1996
- Martin Assig, 1997
- Jaume Plensa, Projekte auf Papier, 1997
- Jaume Plensa, Wie ein Hauch, 1997
- Magnus von Plessen, S.A.L.I.G.I.A., 1997
- John Noel Smith, 1998
- Matthias Müller, Film und Photographie, 2001
- Alice Stepanek, Steven Maslin, Bodenlos, 2002
- Jaume Plensa, Crown Fountain, 2002
- Birgit Dieker, Kardio, 2002/2003
- Zhang Huan, Photographie und Video, 2003
- Frauke Eigen, Illusion Allusion, 2004/2005
- The Blue Noses Group, (Slava Mizin und Sasha Shaburov from Novosibirsk) The Blue Noses, 2005/2006
- Susan Hiller, Outlaws and Curiosities, 2006
- Martin Borowski, Homestory, 2007
- Hye Rim Lee, Crystal City, 2008
- Alexei Wiktorowitsch Kallima, Closed Party, 2008/2009
- Olga Chernysheva, Caesuras, 2009
- Susan Hefuna, Hefuna / Hefuna, 2009
- Thomas Florschuetz, Durchsicht, 2012
- Sergey Bratkov, Chapiteau Moscow, 2013
- Grazia Varisco, Se… 1959–2014, 2014
- Turi Simeti. Alcamo, 2015
- Tomás Maldonado, Werke/Opere 2000–2015, 2015
- Alliance 22, Monochromia, 2016
- Amélie Grözinger, Solid Matter 2.0, 2017
- Simon English, I am not Justin Bieber, 2017/2018
- KP Brehmer, Zweimal täglich Zähneputzen, 2018/2019

=== Diehl + Gallery One in Moscow ===
- Jenny Holzer, Like truth, 2008
- Wim Delvoye, New Works, 2008
- Group show: Laughterlife – New Art from Russia and Central Asia, 2008
- Zhang Huan, Paintings and Sculptures, 2008/2009
- Jaume Plensa, Silent Music, 2009
- David Ter-Oganyan, Aleksandra Galkina, Scale, 2009
- Group show: Glasnost. Soviet Non-Conformist Art from the 1980s, 2010
- in cooperation with Baibakov Art Projects: Olga Chernysheva, Participation in Modernikon – Contemporary Art from Russia, 2011

=== Diehl Cube ===
- Constantin Flondor, Über einige Flächen mit gemeinsamen Ebenen, 2013
- Gonn Mosny, Above the Line – Atmen und Malen, 2013/2014
- Homage to Lucio Amelio, The Early Hacker 1960–70, 2014
- Carla Guagliardi, Fuga, 2014
- Mark Lammert, Floaters, 2015
- James Lee Byars, The Secret Archive. Dieter Hacker Collection. Curated by Mark Gisbourne, 2014
- Nanda Vigo, Zero in the Mirror, 2015
- Ivan Gorshokov, The Way of King’s Pie, 2015
- Anastasia Khoroshilova, Die Übrigen 2015
- Alexander Rodchenko, Jump, 2017
- Hartmut Böhm, Objects in Dialogue, 2017

== Publications (selection) ==
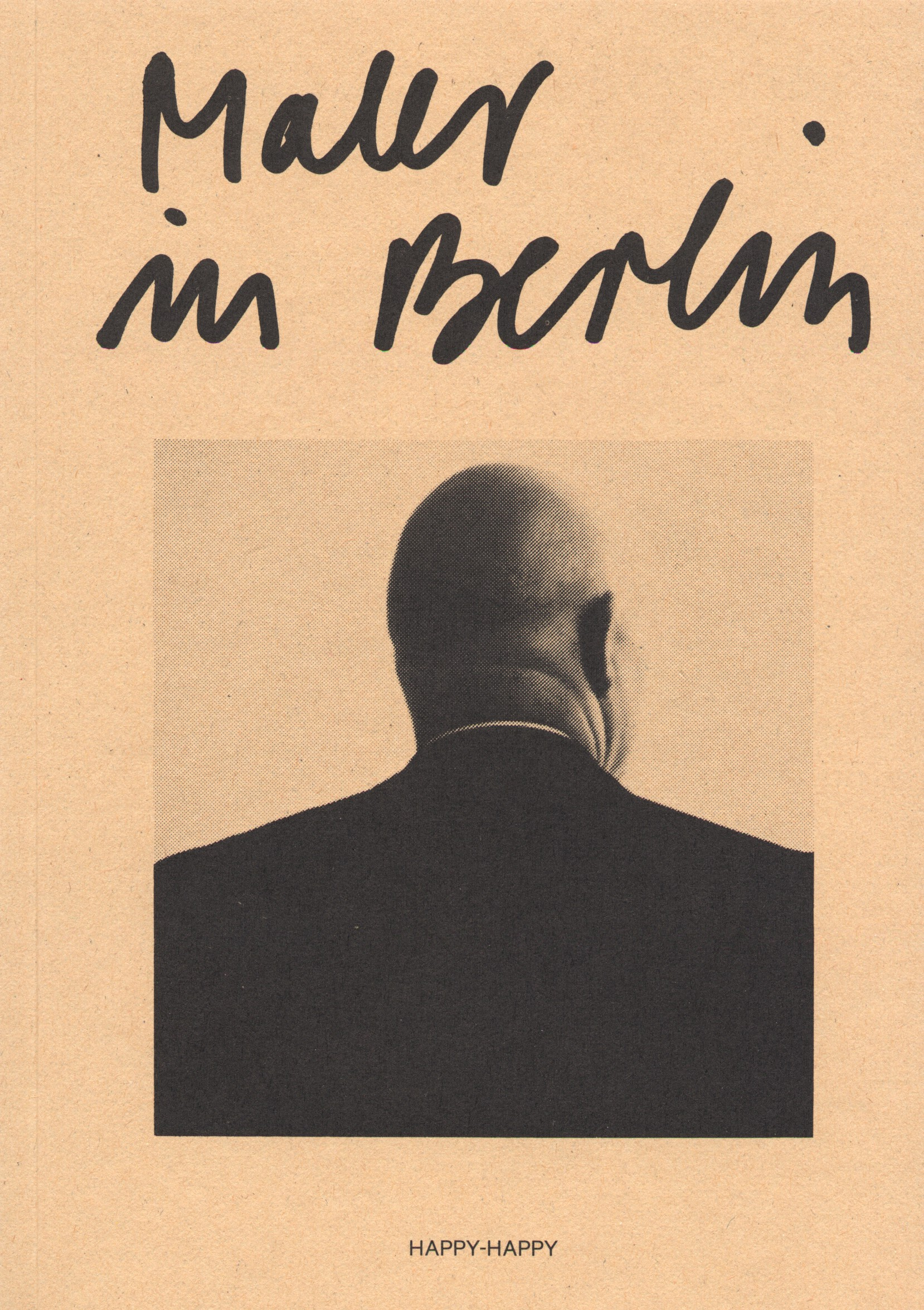
Maler in Berlin

- Christos M. Joachimides (Ed.): Zeitgeist. Edited by Ursula Prinz u. Volker Diehl. Berlin: Frölich & Kaufmann, 1982 (in German).
- Volker Diehl, Roland Hagenberg (Eds.): Maler in Berlin. Berlin: HAPPY-HAPPY, [1982] (in German).
- Volker Diehl, Roland Hagenberg (Eds.): ... Und. Berlin: HAPPY-HAPPY, [1983] (in German).
- Volker Diehl (Ed.): Martin Assig. Berlin: Galerie Volker Diehl, 1990 (in German).
- Andy Warhol: Flowers. New York, Berlin: Stellan Holm Gallery, Galerie Volker Diehl, 1994.
- Galerie Großinsky & Brümmer, Galerie Volker Diehl (Eds.): Martin Assig. Karlsruhe and Berlin: Galerie Großinsky & Brümmer and Galerie Volker Diehl, 1997 (in German.
- Jaume Plensa: Wie ein Hauch. Berlin: Galerie Volker Diehl, 1998 (in German).
- Susan Hiller: The curiosities of Sigmund Freud. Berlin: Galerie Volker Diehl, 2006.
- Zhang Huan: Drawings – On the Occasion of the Exhibition Zhang Huan – Drawings, at Galerie Volker Diehl, Berlin, March 10 to April 10, 2007. München: Schirmer/Mosel, 2007.
- Martin Borowski: Homestory Visitation. Berlin: Galerie Volker Diehl, 2007.
- Ling Jian: The Last Idealism. Berlin: Galerie Volker Diehl, 2007.
- Martin Assig: Westwerk Havelhaus. Berlin and München: Galerie Volker Diehl and Schirmer/Mosel, 2008 (in German).
- Olga Chernysheva, Boris Groys: Caesuras. Berlin: Galerie Volker Diehl, 2009.
- Joseph Backstein, Ekaterina Degot, Boris Groys: Glasnost – Soviet Non-Conformist Art from the 1980s. Haunch of Venision; London: Galerie Volker Diehl, 2010.
- Christian Megert: Licht und Bewegung. Berlin: Galerie Volker Diehl, 2013 (in German).
- Peter Sedgley: Singing Light. Berlin: Diehl, 2014.
- Rolf-Gunter Dienst: Primavera. Berlin: Volker Diehl, Allegra Ravizza, 2015, ISBN 978-3-8947998-0-9.
- Ralf Hanselle, Volker Diehl, Stefan Heyne: Prime Time – archetypes of abstraction in photography. Berlin: Galerie Volker Diehl, 2016, ISBN 978-3-9817940-1-4.
- Julia Nefedova, Lena Vazhenina: Internet doesn’t allow me to forget you. Berlin: Galerie Volker Diehl, 2016, ISBN 978-3-9817940-0-7.
- Simon English: My Big Self Decoy Justin Beiber. London: Black Dog Publishing, 2017.
- Tiberiy Szilvashi: Rembrandt-Zoom – Melancholie als Alchemie der Malerei. Published by Volker Diehl. Berlin: ciconia ciconia, 2019 (in German).
