= Roland Hagenberg =

Austrian writer, artist and photographer

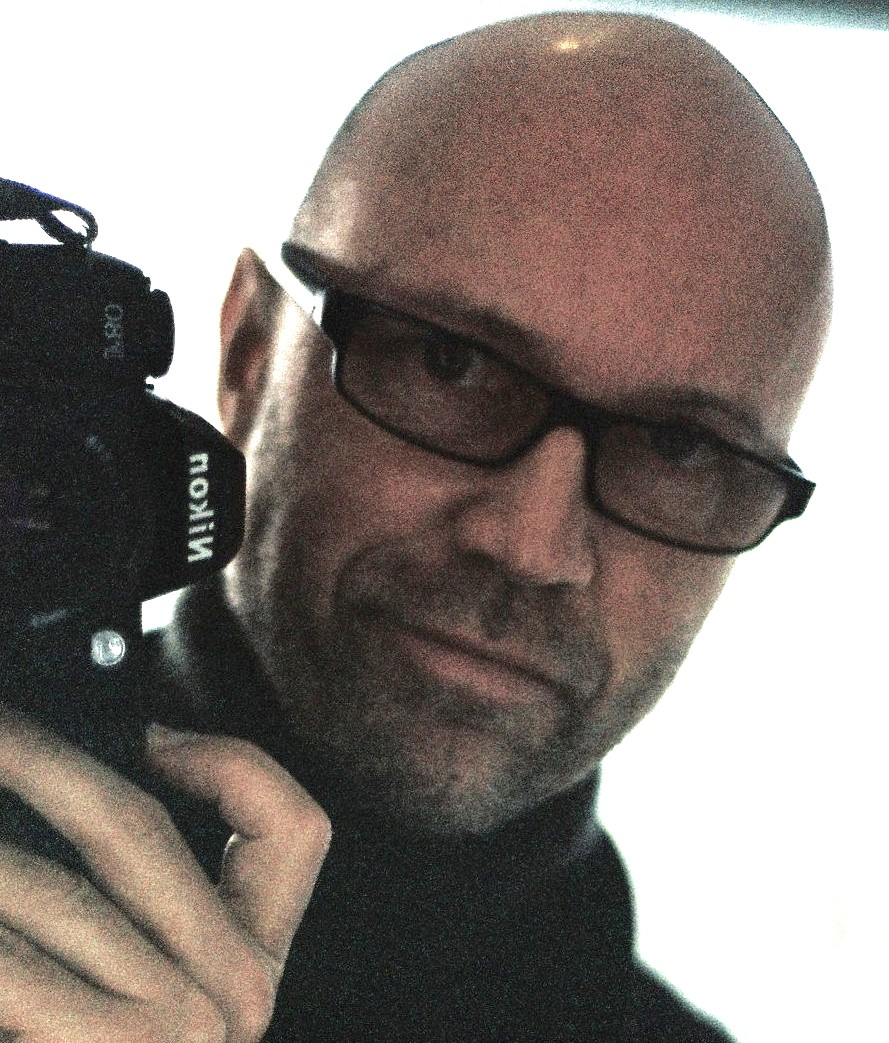
Selfportrait Roland Hagenberg

Roland Hagenberg (born 1955 in Radkersburg) is an Austrian author, artist and photographer. He has lived in Tokyo and Kyoto since 1993.

== Life and work ==
=== Vienna until 1979 ===
Roland Hagenberg grew up in Vienna. Inspired by the writings of Carl Gustav Jung and Sigmund Freud, Hagenberg began working as a nurse in a psychiatric clinic, the Steinhof, designed by architect Otto Wagner. At this time, he published his first poems and texts in the literary magazine Freibord. With the help of authors such as Friederike Mayröcker, Ernst Jandl, Elfriede Czurda and Robert Menasse, he founded the literary magazine Die Klinge together with Franz Krahberger.

=== Berlin 1979 - 1983 ===
After his compulsory service in the Austrian army, Hagenberg travelled through Europe and North Africa. He then lived in Berlin as an author and photographer. He published Wiener in Berlin, a book with photos and interviews with renowned authors and artists such as H. C. Artmann, Oswald Wiener, Dieter Roth and Elfriede Czurda. While researching the book Maler in Berlin together with gallery owner Volker Diehl (with photos and texts by Hagenberg) he befriended the artists Martin Kippenberger, Jörg Immendorff, Markus Lüpertz, Georg Baselitz and neo-expressionist painters from the Junge Wilde group, Rainer Fetting, Bernd Zimmer and Helmut Middendorf. In Berlin, he met Andy Warhol for the first time, whom he visited in New York for a magazine report, which lead to his move to Manhattan.

=== New York 1983 - 1992 ===
Hagenberg continued to write for German magazines like Stern and Berliner Kunstblatt at a time when the so-called East Village movement emerged. He founded Pelham Press in 1985 to publish art guides and catalogues. This work introduced him to art critic Robert Pincus-Witten and to artists such as Jeff Koons, Louise Bourgeois, Francesco Clemente, George Segal, Dorothea Tanning and Robert Mapplethorpe. He later worked on book projects with Mark Kostabi, Karel Appel, Karl A. Meyer and Alexander Rutsch. Together with the Russian artist Mihail Chemiakin, he founded the magazine Art of Russia and the West. Roland's photographs of Jean-Michel Basquiat at work in his studio became iconic images that can be seen in international exhibitions, books and films. The book Crosby Street about Hagenberg's time in New York and his collaboration with the Swiss artist Karl A. Meyer were published by Art In Flow Verlag Berlin in 2022.

=== Tokio-Raiding-Kyoto 1993 until today ===
In New York, Shigeko Kubota awakens Hagenberg's interest in Japanese culture. His new focus on contemporary Japanese architecture shifts the center of his life to Japan. As a freelance contributor to Vogue and Architectural Digest he introduced many architects in Europe who later received international recognition, including Kengo Kuma, Toyo Ito, Kazuyo Sejima and Jun Aoki. Roland Hagenberg produces exhibitions and video documentaries. He wrote books that also present the older generation of architects such as Tadao Ando, Kisho Kurokawa, Arata Isozaki and Kenzo Tange. At the same time, he also portrayed personalities from the fields of film, fashion and art. In 2010, he initiated the Raiding Project in Raiding near Vienna, the birthplace of the composer Franz Liszt. The award-winning Storkhouse guest house by Terunobu Fujimori and outdoor sculptures by Hiroshi Hara, Kengo Kuma and Karl A. Meyer were initiated and produced by Hagenberg. The Silverhouse guest house - designed by Hagenberg - was completed in 2017. In Kyoto, Hagenberg also works with traditional artists in the fields of ceramics, calligraphy and lacquerware.

== Exhibitions (selection) ==
- 1984: 5 Painters from Berlin (curator R. Hagenberg), Daniel Newburg Gallery, New York; Roland Hagenberg Photographs, Rosa Esman Gallery, New York
- 1985: Psycho Pueblo (curator R. Hagenberg together with Zush Evrugo Mental State), Fernando Vijande Gallery, Madrid; Eastvillage Funktional (Curator R. Hagenberg), Rosa Esman Gallery, New York
- 1986: Happy Happy (curator R. Hagenberg), Phyllis Kind Gallery, New York
- 1995: Jean-Michel Basquiat - Portraits, Moca-Foundation, Tokyo
- 1999: New York Artists – Photographs, Gallery 360°, Tokyo
- 2001: sur/FACE:14 Contemporary Japanese Architects with models and drawings (curated and with photographs by R.Hagenberg), BMW Square, Tokyo
- 2003: Roland Hagenberg - 22 Photographs, Maison Franco-Japonaise, Tokyo; Planes to catch, and things to see!, Gallery of the Austrian Embassy, Tokyo
- 2004: C’est si bon! Photos from Paris, Orbient Club, Tokyo
- 2005: Lightyears – Models and Drawings by Japanese Architects (curator R. Hagenberg), Mitsubishi Jisho Artium Gallery, Fukuoka, Japan
- 2006: SOBYO – Drawings by Japanese Architects (curator R. Hagenberg), Hubert Winter Galerie, Vienna; 40+/40, Sin Sin Fine Arts, Hong Kong
- 2007: Beautiful – Photographs of outstanding women, Le Meridien Grand Pacific Gallery, Tokyo.
- 2008: Video Works Roland Hagenberg, Yokohama Triennale National Day, Austrian Embassy in Japan
- 2009: Photographs (group exhibition with Sheila Metzner) Krash Magazine, Ohara Museum of Art, Kurashiki, Japan; Architecture of the Future (curator R. Hagenberg), Mitsubishi Jisho Artium, Fukuoka, Japan
- 2010: JapanLisztRaiding with models of tiny houses by Japanese architects created for Hagenberg's Raiding Project (curator R. Hagenberg), Vienna Architecture Centre
- 2011: Raiding Project: Crossover Architecture (curator R. Hagenberg), BMW Group Space, Tokyo
- 2012: Kleinarbeit – Small Works for a Small Town, Municipality of Raiding, Raiding, Austria
- 2013: Karl A. Meyer - Cloud of Humanity, Raiding Foundation, Raiding, Austria
- 2014:Terunobu Fujimori – Storkhouse (curator R. Hagenberg), Mitsubishi Jisho Artium, Fukuoka, Japan; Basquiat and Friends – Photographs, Sin Sin Fine Art, Hong Kong
- 2015 Körperlandschaft – Sheila Metzner und Roland Hagenberg, Ponyhof Artclub Gallery, Munich; Hidden (Curator R. Hagenberg), Raiding Foundation Galerie, Raiding, Austria
- 2017: Basquiat: Boom for Real with photos by Roland Hagenberg, Barbican, London
- 2018: Jean-Michel Basquiat – Works from the Mugrabi Collection, with photos by Roland Hagenberg, Centro Cultural Banco do Brasil; Basquiat in his Studio, Galerie Peter Sillem, Frankfurt; New York Artists – Photographs. Mitsubishi Jisho Artium Gallery, Fukuoka, Japan
- 2019: NY / moment, with photo portraits of Keith Haring, RVCA Gallery, Shibuya, Tokyo; Jean-Michel Basquiat: Made in Japan, with photos by Roland Hagenberg. Mori Arts Center Gallery, Tokyo; Photographs Roland Hagenberg. Dublin Art Fair and Sal Fine Art Gallery, Dublin, Ireland
- 2020: Roland Hagenberg and Makoto Azuma permanent outdoor sculpture. STOA169 Museum, Polling; Tokyo Curiosity – Photographs (Group exhibition), Bunkamura, Shibuya, Tokyo; Portraits of Creative People, Ideakei Gallery and Arcadia, Kyoto
- 2021: NY 1983 revisited, photos on canvas, ACE Hotel Kyoto F1 Gallery
- 2022: Celebration, (Group exhibition), Sin Sin Fine Art, Hong Kong; New York Friends, Imura Art Gallery Kyoto; +R (Group exhibition), Kyoto Museum of Crafts and Design, Kyoto; Roland Hagenberg Photo Portraits from the 1980s, Dimensions Art Center, Taipei; Fotografien Roland Hagenberg und Erika Anna Schumacher, Galerie Coelner-Zimmer, Düsseldorf; Multiverse, Sugata Gallery – Zenkashoin, Kyoto
- 2023: Andyworld, Marc Jacobs’ Bookmark, Harajuku, Tokyo; Kowaku – Seduction/Fascination: Drawings, Rokujuan – former studio of Keinen Imao, Kyoto
- 2024: Kyojitsu – Fiction+Fact – Basquiat's 14 Stations of the Cross, paintings and photographs, SO1 Gallery, Harajuku, Tokyo

== Film, Music, Theatre (selection) ==
- 1995: Hitotsu no hato de, filming and script for music video by J-Pop Singer Hitomi Mieno, JVCKENWOOD Victor Entertainment Corp, Japan; Boys be ambitious, filming and script for music video by J-Pop Singer Hitomi Mieno, JVCKENWOOD Victor Entertainment Corp. Japan
- 2003: SurFACE – 14 Contemporary Japanese Architects, direction, script and interviews for documentary film. DVD, Uplink Tokyo
- 2004: GALAXY – CD with 16 songs, written, composed and performed by R. Hagenberg. Riverside Music, Tokyo
- 2007: Rain, Lyrics for J-Pop Duo Youmou to Ohana, Album: Live in Living ’07, Label: LD&K, Japan
- 2008: The magic is gone, Songtext for J-Pop Duo Youmou to Ohana, Album: Te o tsunaide (Hand in Hand), Label: LD&K, Japan
- 2009: SHOW ME, CD with 16 songs, written, composed and performed by R. Hagenberg. Raiding Records, Austria
- 2011: Hiroshi Hara, 120 min video for Architectural Environments for Tomorrow curated by Kazuyo Sejima at Museum of Contemporary Art, Tokyo
- 2016: Vor meinem Fenster, Lyrics for the Vienna State Opera singer Ildiko Raimondi, set to music by Eduard Kutrowatz; CD Begegnungen; Video Albert Kriemler/Akris + Sou Fujimoto Collaboration, filmed and directed by Roland Hagenberg, Tokyo-Paris
- 2018: Jetlag, theatre play, script and music R. Hagenberg, world premier at Rationaltheater, Munich
- 2023: Video documentary Albert Kriemler/Akris + David Chipperfield Collaboration, filmproduction by Roland Hagenberg, Tokyo

== Publications (selection) ==
- Wiener in Berlin, written and photographed by Roland Hagenberg, foreword by Detlev Meyer, HAPPY-HAPPY publisher, Berlin 1982
- Maler in Berlin, ed. by Volker Diehl and Roland Hagenberg, with photographs and texts by Roland Hagenberg, HAPPY-HAPPY publisher, Berlin 1982
- Eastvillage: A Guide. A Documentary, ed. by Roland Hagenberg, with essays by Alan Jones, Jo Shane, Nicolas A. Moufarrege, Carlo McCormick et al., Pelham Press, New York 1985.
- Upheaval – Works by Mark Kostabi, ed. and produced by R.Hagenberg, Pelham Press, New York 1985.
- Happy Happy – A children's coloring book, by contemporary artists conceived and produced by R. Hagenberg, Egret Publications, New York 1986
- Dupe of Being – The complete writings by and about Karel Appel with photos by and edited by R. Hagenberg, Edition Lafayette, New York 1986
- Alexander Rutsch – paintings, sculptures and drawings with photographs by R. Hagenberg (editor and designer) and texts by Friederike Mayröcker and Carlo MacCormick, Edition Lafayette, New York, 1990.
- The complete sculptures by Karel Appel, edited by Roland Hagenberg and Harriet de Visser, with photographs by Roland Hagenberg, Edition Lafayette, New York 1991
- Russische Landung, Exhibition book Bernd Zimmer, text R. Hagenberg, Galerie Kämpf Forum für International Zeitgenössische Kunst GmbH, 2004
- 24 Japanese Architects, photos, interviews and essays by Roland Hagenberg, Tsinghua University Press, Beijing 2009 ISBN 978-7-302-23085-4
- Nobuyoshi Araki, with interview and photos by Roland Hagenberg, in: STERN, Fotografie Portfolio Nr. 56, 2009, ISBN 978-3-570-19846-9
- 24 Japanese Architects, photos and interviews by Roland Hagenberg, Kashiwa Shobo Publisher, Tokyo 2011, ISBN 978-4-7601-3964-4
- Jos Pirkners Architektur, text and photos by Roland Hagenberg, in: Jos Pirkner: Die Bullen von Fuschl (Red Bull Headquarter), Pantauro-Verlag, Salzburg 2014, ISBN 978-3-7105-0001-5, S. 24-43
- Roland Hagenberg Poems, with poems, photographs and drawings by the author, Art In Flow Verlag, Berlin 2017, ISBN 978-3-938457-33-7
- 99+1 JAPAN: Traveling Through Art, Design and Architecture. 100 travel recommendations. Roland Hagenberg (writer and editor), in: Japan National Tourism Organization (JNTO), 2017
- Jean Michel Basquiat XXL (includes photo by Roland Hagenberg), TASCHEN Books (publisher), Cologne 2018, ISBN 978-3-8365-5037-6
- RIO. Love and Life in Times of Executions. Karl A. Meyer (polaroids) and Roland Hagenberg (poems), Art In Flow Verlag, Berlin 2019, ISBN 978-3-938457-45-0
- Terunobu Fujimori, Roland Hagenberg, Hiroshi Hara, Karl A. Meyer: RAIDING Project. 2009-2019, Art In Flow Verlag, Berlin 2019, ISBN 978-3-938457-46-7
- Roland Hagenberg, Karl A. Meyer: Crosby Street, Art In Flow, Berlin 2022, ISBN 978-3-938457-47-4
- Jean Michel Basquiat Handbook (includes photos by Roland Hagenberg), No More Rulers (publisher), New York 2024, ISBN 979-8-9889286-0-7
