= Philip Pocock (disambiguation) =

Philip Pocock is the name of:

- Philip Pocock (artist) (born 1954), Canadian artist and author
- Philip Pocock (1906–1984), Roman Catholic bishop of Toronto
- Philip Pocock Catholic Secondary School, Ontario, Canada
