= Grazia Varisco =

Italian visual artist and designer (born 1937)

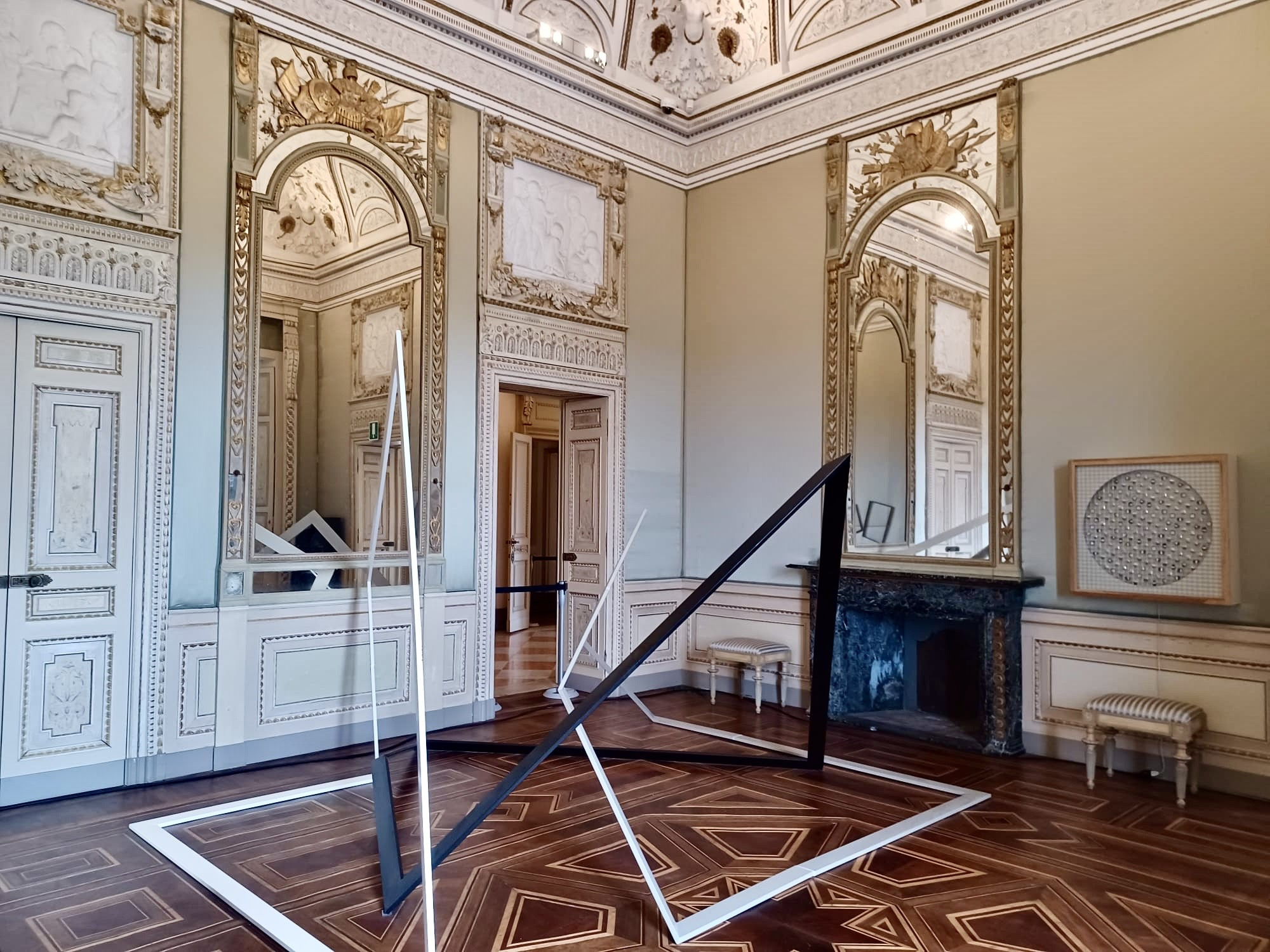
A work by Grazia Varisco at the Royal Palace of Monza

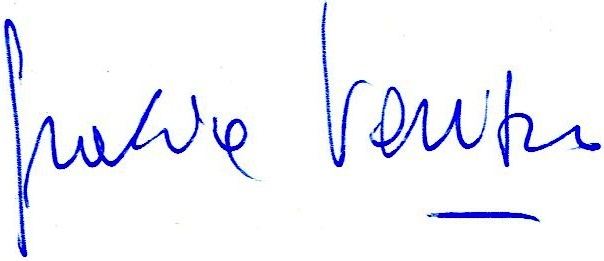
The artist's signature, 1987

Grazia Varisco (born 1937 in Milan) is an Italian visual artist and designer.

Varisco attended the Brera Academy of Fine Arts in Milan from 1956 to 1960, where she was a student of Achille Funi. In 1960 she joined Giovanni Anceschi, Davide Boriani, Gianni Colombo and Gabriele De Vecchi's kinetic art and op art Gruppo T, with whom she participated in exhibitions such as 'Arte Programmata' (Milan, 1962), 'Nouvelle tendance' (Zagreb, 1963) and the 'Miriorama' series (Milan, Genoa, Tokyo, Rome, Padua and Venice, 1960–63). Between 1961 and 1967, she worked as a graphic designer for the multinational retailer La Rinascente, the architecture and design magazine Abitare, the design company Kartell, and the Milan City Council.

Varisco is considered one of the few female artists involved in the op art movement together with Edna Andrade, Bridget Riley and Vera Molnár. Her work has been featured in many international exhibitions, including the Venice Biennale (1964, 1986 and 2022), the Rome Quadriennale (1973), the Toyama Triennale (1990); 'Force Fields: Phases of the Kinetic’ (Museu d’Art Contemporani de Barcelona and Hayward Gallery, London, 2000); 'Beyond Geometry' (Los Angeles County Museum of Art and at the Pérez Art Museum Miami, 2004) and 'Op Art' (Schirn Kunsthalle Frankfurt, 2007).

From 1981 to 2007, she was Professor of Theory of Perception at the Brera Academy of Fine Arts.

In 2007, the President of Italy Giorgio Napolitano awarded her the 'Presidente della Repubblica Prize for Sculpture' in Rome.

== Selected exhibitions ==
- 2017: Grazia Varisco: Allineamenti scorrevoli ricorrenti, Triennale Museum, Milan
- 2015: Grazia Varisco: Filo Rosso 1960–2015, Cortesi Gallery, Lugano, Switzerland
- 2014: If… Works 1959–2014, Volker Diehl Gallery, Berlin
- 2013: Grazia Varisco: With a Restless Gaze, Ritter Museum, Waldenbuch, Germany
- 2012: Ghosts in the Museum, New Museum of Contemporary Art, New York
- 2007: Op Art, Schirn Kunsthalle Frankfurt
- 2005: L'oeil moteur: Art optique e cinétique 1950–1975, Museum of Modern and Contemporary Art, Strasbourg
- 2005: Gli ambienti del Gruppo T: Le origini dell'arte interattiva, National Gallery of Modern Art, Rome
- 2000: Beyond Geometry: Experiments in forms 1940s to 1970s, Los Angeles County Museum and Miami Art Museum (now Pérez Art Museum Miami)
- 2000: Force Fields: Phases of the Kinetic, Barcelona Museum of Contemporary Art and Hayward Gallery, London

== Bibliography ==
- Gillo Dorfles, Grazia Varisco 1960/1976, 1976, Edizioni del Naviglio, Milan
- Giovanni Maria Accame, Grazia Varisco 1958/2000, 2001, Edizioni Maredarte, Bergamo
- Jacqueline Ceresoli, Grazia Varisco: Se guardo ascolto lo spazio, 2006, Skira, Milan ISBN 9788876247293
- Giorgio Verzotti and Elisabetta Longari, Grazia Varisco: Se..., 2012, Edizioni Mazzotta, Milan, ISBN 9788820219901
- Hsiaosung Kok and Francesco Tedeschi, Grazia Varisco: Mit rastlosem Blick, 2013, Ritter Museum, Waldenbuch, ISBN 9783884234488
- Michele Robecchi, Grazia Varisco: If (1960–2015), 2015, Mousse Publishing, Milan ISBN 9788867491865
