= Gianni Colombo =

Italian painter

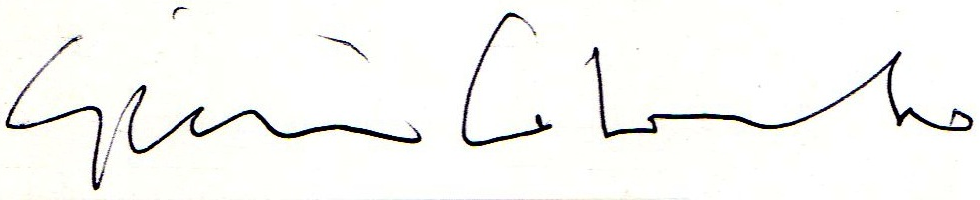
Signature of Gianni Colombo, 1990

Gianni Colombo (Milan, 1933 – Melzo, 3 February 1993) was an Italian artist, member of the kinetic art movement.

In the 1960s, Colombo attended Accademia di Brera in Milan, where he met Davide Boriani, Gabriele De Vecchi, Giovanni Anceschi and Grazia Varisco. Together they formed "Gruppo T", a collective of artists interested in investigating the relationship between images and movement and the participatory element of art through kinetic forms.

Through his work Colombo dealt mainly with the perception of space, creating architectural environments and using a variety of supports including mechanical ones. He was awarded the Grand Prize of the Venice Biennale of 1968 with one of its most famous works, elastic space.

In 1985, he became director of Accademia di Brera, where he also taught. In 1986, Colombo expanded his activities to theatre (he was a set designer for the Operstheater in Frankfurt) and architecture.

== Bibliographical references ==
1. Documenta IV. Catalogue of the exhibition, Kassel 1968.
2. Kimpel, Harald / Stengel, Karin: documenta IV 1968, Internationale Ausstellung. Eine fotografische Rekonstruktion, Bremen 2007, ISBN 9783861085249.
3. Carolyn Christov-Bakargiev and Marcella Beccaria (eds), Gianni Colombo. Castello di Rivoli, Museo d'Arte Contemporanea 2009. Milano, Skira, 2009, ISBN 9788857203140.
