= Stefan Heyne =

German photographer and stage designer (born 1965)

Stefan Heyne (born 19 July 1965 in Brandenburg an der Havel) is a German photographer and stage designer. He lives and works in Berlin.

== Education ==
Between 1987 and 1992, Heyne studied stage design under Volker Pfüller at the Kunsthochschule Berlin-Weißensee. He continued his studies there from 1992 to 1993 as "Meisterschüler" of Pfüller. Since 1995, he is working as a freelance stage designer. In 2004, he began to photograph.

== Photographic work ==
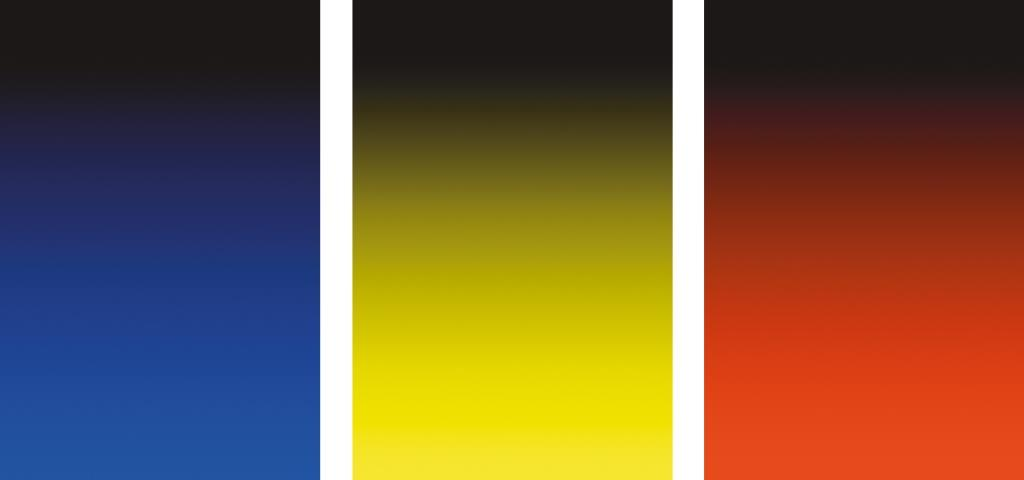
Who is afraid of Photography, 2014. Print on alu-dibond, three pieces, each 230 x 150 cm

Heyne is a practitioner of a new approach to photographic abstraction in Germany. With his usually large-format works, Heyne departs from traditional photographic conventions. There exists neither an interpretable object nor a contour on which the in-focus or the out-of-focus can be fixed. Insofar as these parameters do not become the subject matter of the image, the motifs – evade our routines of perception. Heyne's works play with the bewildering aspect of the apparent and in this way they explore the conditions in which photography is perceived. Therefore, they can also be seen as a powerful contribution to the current discussion of the philosophical concept of a new realism.

The photographs of Stefan Heyne are emphatically nonrepresentational. The artist omits elements that generally define a photograph, forgoing the use any identifiable motif. Instead, he creates abstract photographs that are honed to perfection by paring his imagery to a blurred play of light and shadows with no indication of form. In his most recent series of works Heyne even avoids the use of soft-focus as an artistic device and emphasizes, in contrast, the high-definition reproduction of perhaps one of the purest motifs of all: the cloudless sky photographed by the artist from the window of an airplane. The colour spectra of pure light that are revealed in these images seem blurry and out of focus, but they are not. Heyne thus achieves the most radical degree of abstraction in his work to date. In his photographs the viewer is confronted with an endless depth of space and eternity.

== Manifesto of Tabularism ==
In autumn 2014, Heyne and German art critic Ralf Hanselle wrote the Manifesto of Tabularism. It advocates a radical renewal of the photographic medium in contemporary art.

The renewal of photography – seven theses:

1. From today photography is dead. All pictures are rendered, all reproductions are made. And yet we did not get closer to the world. The last images are still due. Tabularism encompasses the last images of photography.
2. Tabularism is a sign and not a signifier. It does not show what the world is made of; it is itself the world. It is the image itself and never a picture of it. With Tabularism photography comes back to itself.
3. Tabularism is a destroyer. It shakes the shell of space und subverts what contains all visible things. It breaks perspective distortion. It is at war with every line.
4. Tabularism is a creator. It takes its light from the edges of the visible, its shadows from the residue of perception. Light and darkness are its true motives.
5. Tabularism is a game. It is dance and dissipation; approach and disengagement. It does not search for the truth, for truth is always deception. Tabularism is only genuine in relation to itself.
6. Tabularism is art. And as art it is freedom. It bursts the corpus of apparatuses; it breaks the will of the camera boxes. Every hard shell is a block in the way to freedom.
7. Tabularism is the future. And yet it is embedded in a story. It follows traditions; it has mothers and fathers. In the darkness of Enlightenment they are waiting for a return of the light

== Exhibitions ==
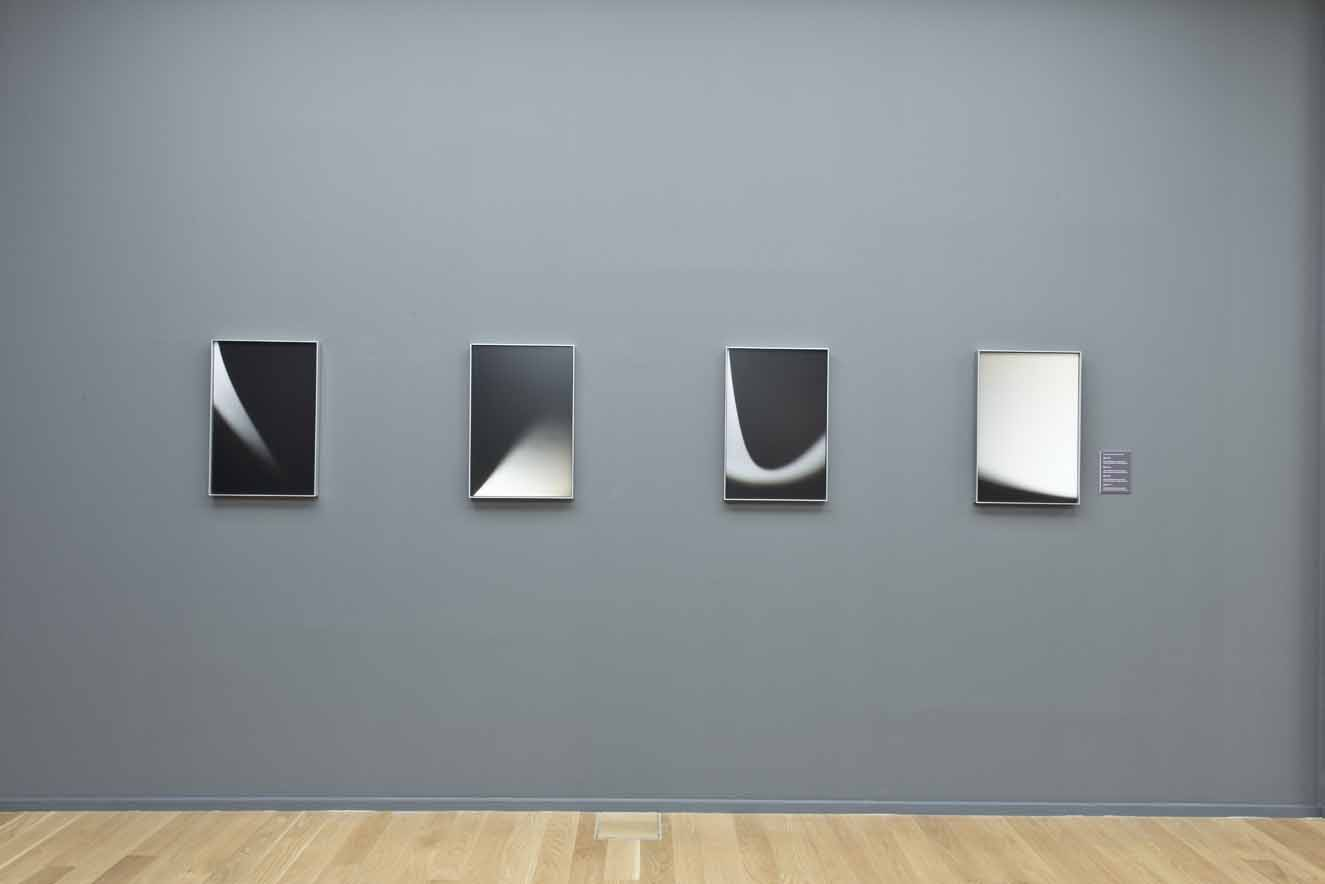
Exhibition view of Naked Light. Die Belichtung des Unendlichen at the Städtische Galerie Dresden – Kunstsammlung, 2014

Heyne has participated in various solo and group exhibitions including the 2nd photofestival Mannheim-Ludwigshafen-Heidelberg Reality Crossings (2007).

=== Solo exhibitions (selection) ===
- 2014 Städtische Galerie Dresden – Kunstsammlung: Naked Light. Die Belichtung des Unendlichen
- 2012 Kunstverein Eislingen: Maximalahnung
- 2012 Kunstsammlungen und Museen Augsburg: Die Magie der Leere. Fotografien 2006-2012
- 2012 Kunstmuseum Dieselkraftwerk Cottbus: Speak to Me. Fotografien
- 2011 Kommunale Galerie Berlin: Woran denkst Du? Fotografien
- 2010 Stadtmuseum Groß-Gerau: Gegendarstellung
- 2010 Stiftung Schloss Neuhardenberg: Erkenntnisschatten
- 2009 Kunsthalle Brennabor, Brandenburg an der Havel: The Noise. Die Belichtung des Ungewissen
- 2008 Lippische Gesellschaft für Kunst, Detmold: Fotografie
- 2008 Kunstraum Potsdam: The Noise. Die Belichtung des Ungewissen
- 2005 Sächsisches Staatsministerium der Finanzen, Dresden: Nachtwache
- 2005 BrotfabrikGalerie, Berlin: Fahrtenschreiber

=== Group exhibitions (selection) ===
- 2016 Kunstmuseum Bochum: Das autonome Bild. Fünf Konzepte aktueller Fotografie
- 2015 Museum im Kulturspeicher Würzburg: Lichtbild und Datenbild. Spuren Konkreter Fotografie
- 2014 Goethe-Institut Hong Kong: Positions 1. New Photography from Germany
- 2012 Kunstsammlungen und Museen Augsburg: Neue Sammlung VI
- 2011 Kommunale Galerie Berlin: Neue Werke 2011. Malerei, Grafik, Fotografie, Objekte
- 2007 Wilhelm-Hack-Museum, Ludwigshafen: Reality Crossings. 2. Fotofestival Mannheim, Ludwigshafen, Heidelberg
- 2004 BrotfabrikGalerie, Berlin: Wo liegt Berlin? Fotografische Annäherungen an eine Stadt
