= Umeda Sky Building =

Skyscraper in Osaka, Japan

Coordinates: 34°42′19″N 135°29′23″E

- 梅田スカイビル
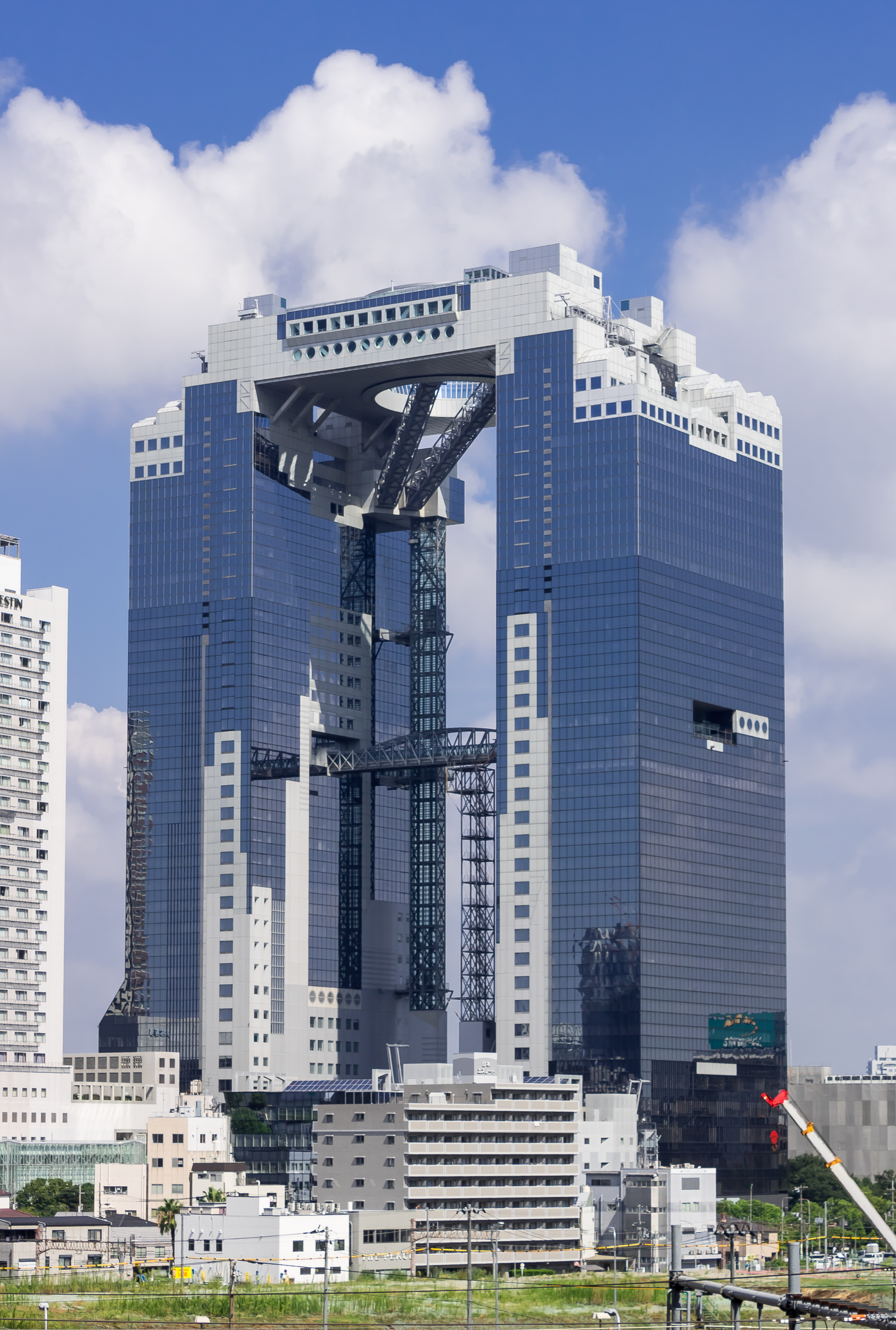

General information
- Location: Osaka Prefecture, Japan
- Completed: March 25, 1993; 33 years ago
- Owner: Sekisui House

Height
- Antenna spire: 190 metres (623.4 ft)
- Roof: 170 metres (557.7 ft)

Technical details
- Floor count: 40 floors above ground, 2 floors underground
- Floor area: 147,397 square meters

Design and construction
- Architect: Hiroshi Hara
- Main contractor: Takenaka; Obayashi; Kajima; Asunaro Aoki Common enterprise

The Umeda Sky Building (梅田スカイビル, Umeda Sukai Biru) is a two-tower mixed-use skyscraper in Osaka, Japan. Located on the outskirts of the Umeda business district in Kita-ku, Osaka, the Umeda Sky Building consists of two 40-story towers interconnected at their two uppermost stories via glass bridges with escalators and elevators that cross an open atrium space. It is currently the fifteenth-tallest building in the prefecture.

The towers reach a total height of 170 m (557.74 ft) while the overall height of the tower including the spires is 190 metres (623.4 ft). The towers were designed by Hiroshi Hara, and were constructed by Takenaka Corporation They were completed in 1993.

== History ==
The building was conceived in 1988 as the "City of Air" project for a mixed-use skyscraper with four interconnected towers in the Umeda central business district, in close proximity to the Yodo River. The third tower of the complex was initially planned to be constructed within the current site of the Vegetable Garden, while the fourth tower was to be located on the eastern side of the third tower. Eventually, the Japan economic bubble of the 1980s caused widespread damage to the Japanese economy and brought the total number of towers down to two.

During the architectural planning of the complex, Hiroshi Hara created two overall concepts for the towers. The first concept was to create a modern landmark in the city featuring modern architecture, and drew inspiration from the Grande Arche in Paris, France, which features a hypercube-like design. The second concept was to emphasize a vision of a "floating city", which can be reflected from the city's urban landscape and is contrasted with the opaque ceramic atrium at the ground floor. The concept also included open-air amenities and viewing decks over the Umeda district and the entire Osaka skyline.

Construction started with the construction of the twin towers using reinforced concrete, while the construction of the sky deck began afterwards. As the structural works of the towers were completed, the sky deck was raised to the ground using a set of hydraulic elevators to raise the section upwards, the first time this was done in a construction project. The installation of the glass-layered escalators and elevators also followed the same system. The tower was fully completed and began opening its doors to the public on March 25, 1993.

== Location ==
The two-tower skyscrapers sits within the Shin-Umeda City, a 4.34-hectare (10.7-acre) mixed-use area that includes The Westin Osaka, and the Shin Umeda City General Information Center. It is also located near key transport hubs such as the Ōsaka Station and the Umeda Station, both of which are among the busiest railway stations in the world.

== Features ==
The building primarily highlights the rooftop Kuchu Teien Observatory, also known as the Floating Garden Observatory. The two-floor observatory features Café Sky 40 and the Fence of Vows. The tower also has an underground market that attempts to recreate the atmosphere of Osaka in the early 20th century. The base of the towers contains the Island Garden, and the Vegetable Garden, with walking trails and water features.

== Ownership ==
The building was mainly owned by Toshiba Corporation through Toshiba Building Co., but in July 2008, Toshiba sold a majority stake (65%) in Toshiba Building to Nomura Real Estate Co. Toshiba retains 35% ownership.

== Tenants ==
Sekisui House is the owner and developer of the complex, and the main tenant of the tower, which contains the company's headquarters. Mazda has an office in the Umeda Sky Building Tower East. The German consulate-general is located on the thirty-fifth floor of the Umeda Sky Building Tower East. AstraZeneca had their Japanese and Asia-Pacific headquarters in the East Tower, until they moved to Grand Front Osaka Tower B in 2014. PlatinumGames is also located in the building.

== Gallery ==
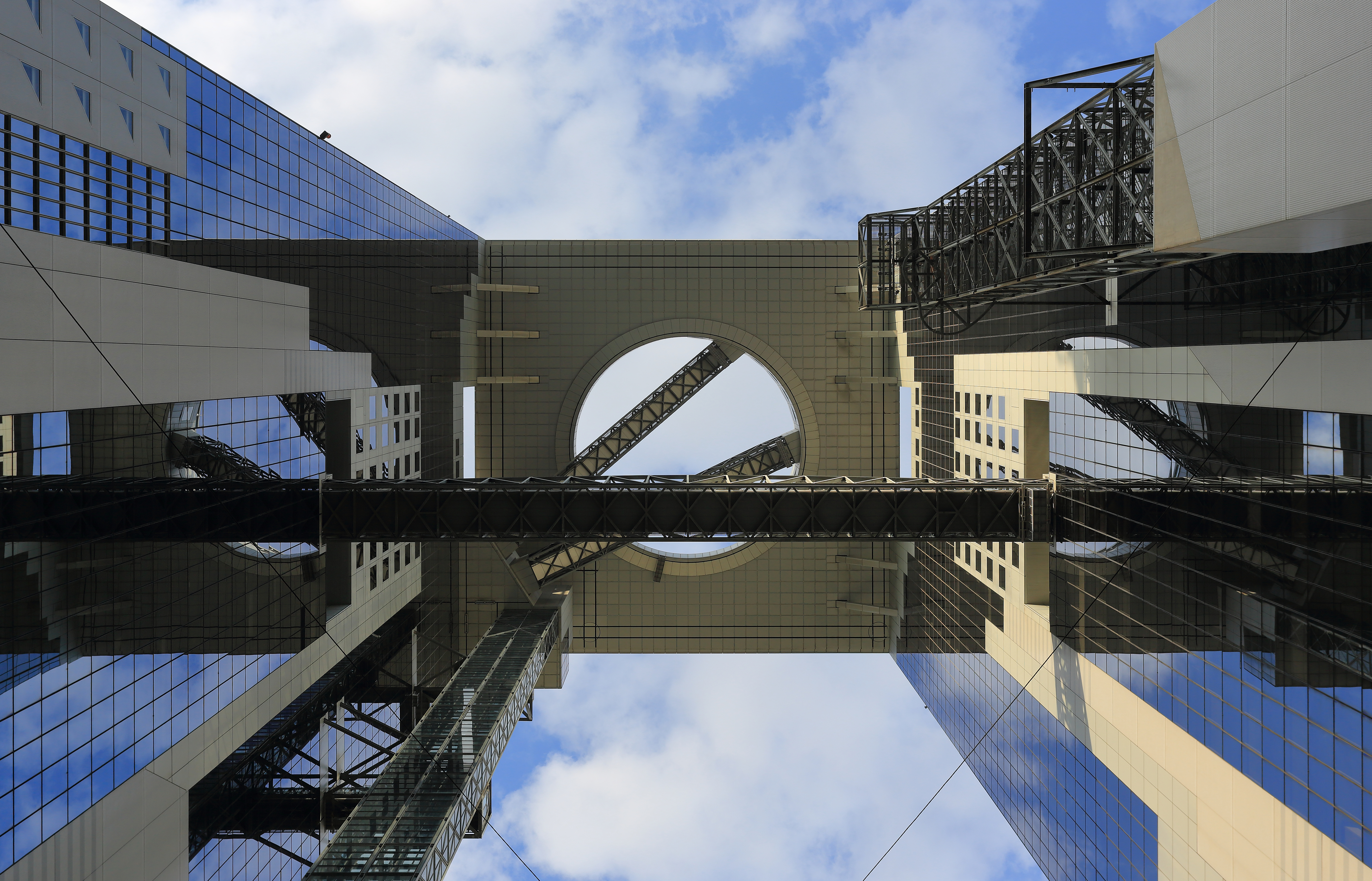
View looking up

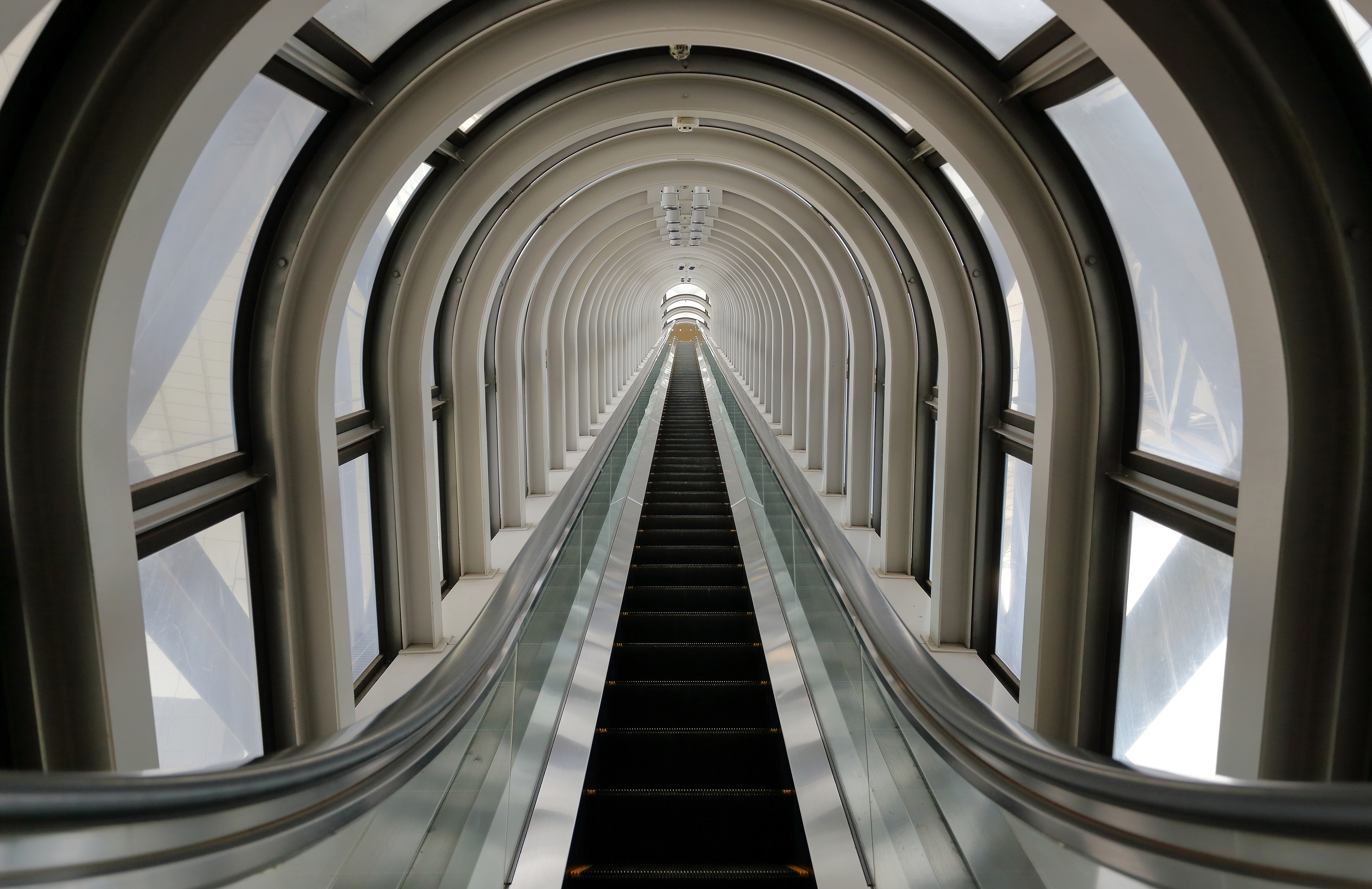
The escalator crossing the wide atrium-like space

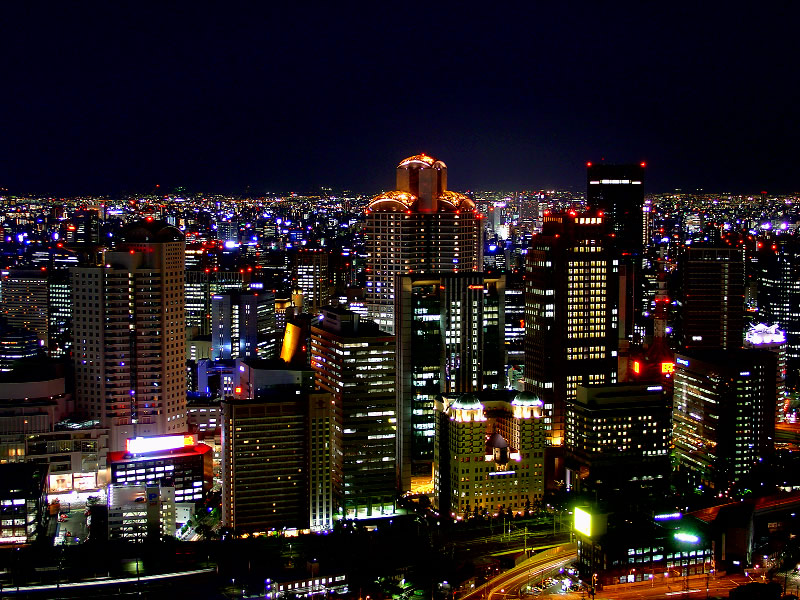
Night view from Umeda Sky Building

Dusk view from Umeda Sky Building

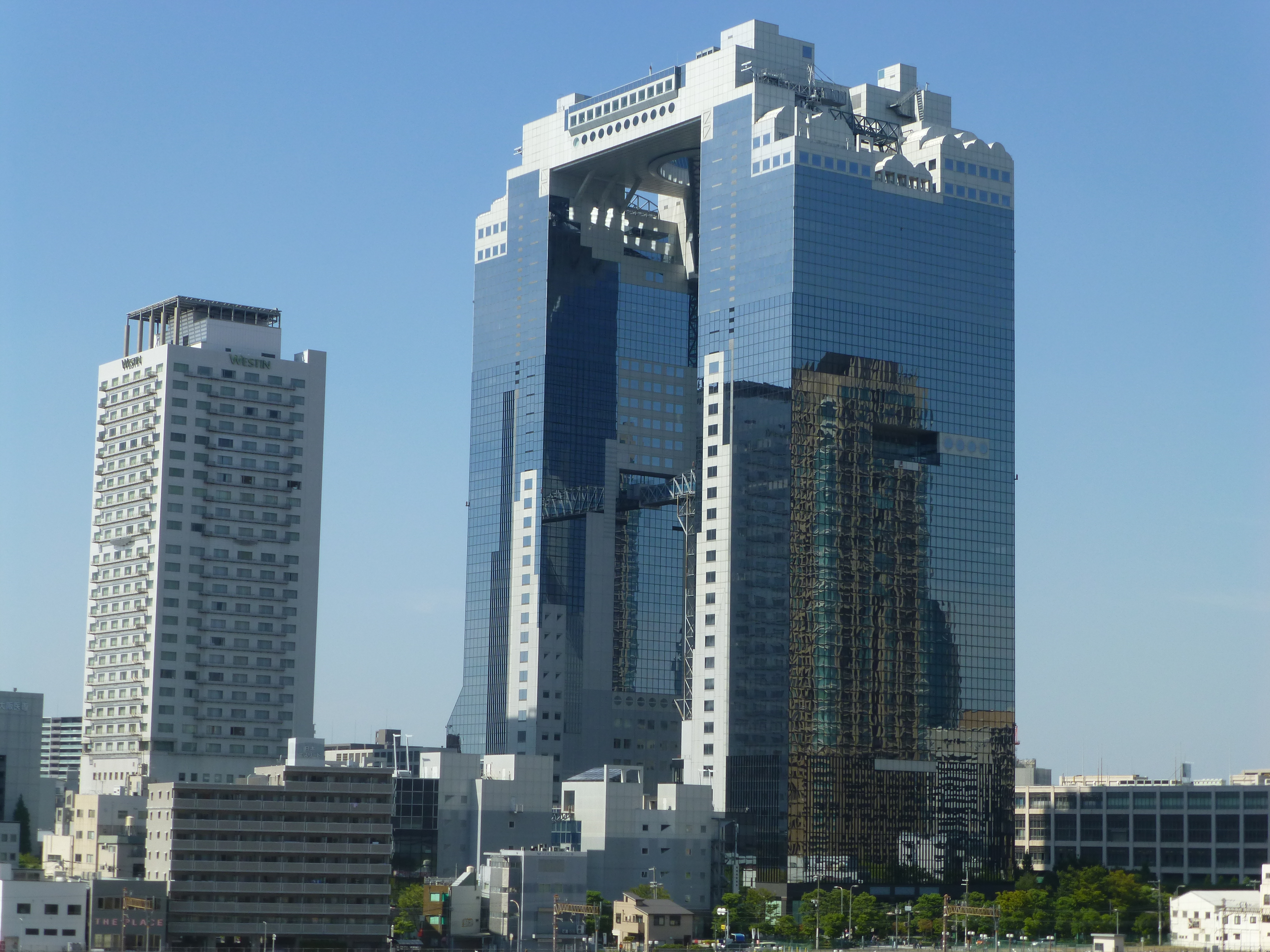
The view of the three towers within the Shin-Umeda City complex, the Westin Umeda and the Umeda Sky Building

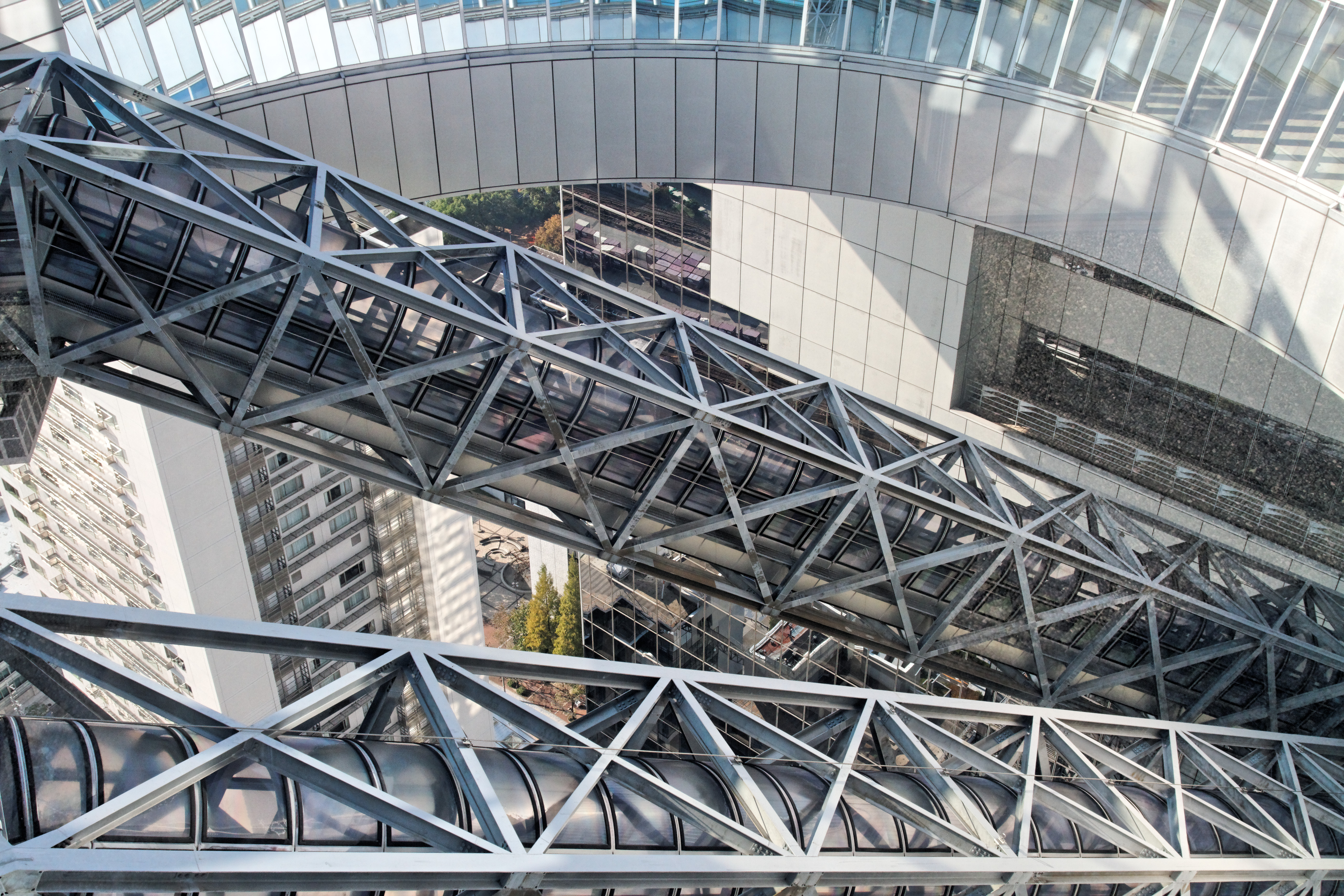
A view of the glass-layered escalator crossings from the Sky Deck

== See also ==
- List of tallest buildings in Osaka
