= Diamond Hall =

Music venue in Nagoya, Japan

- ダイアモンドホール
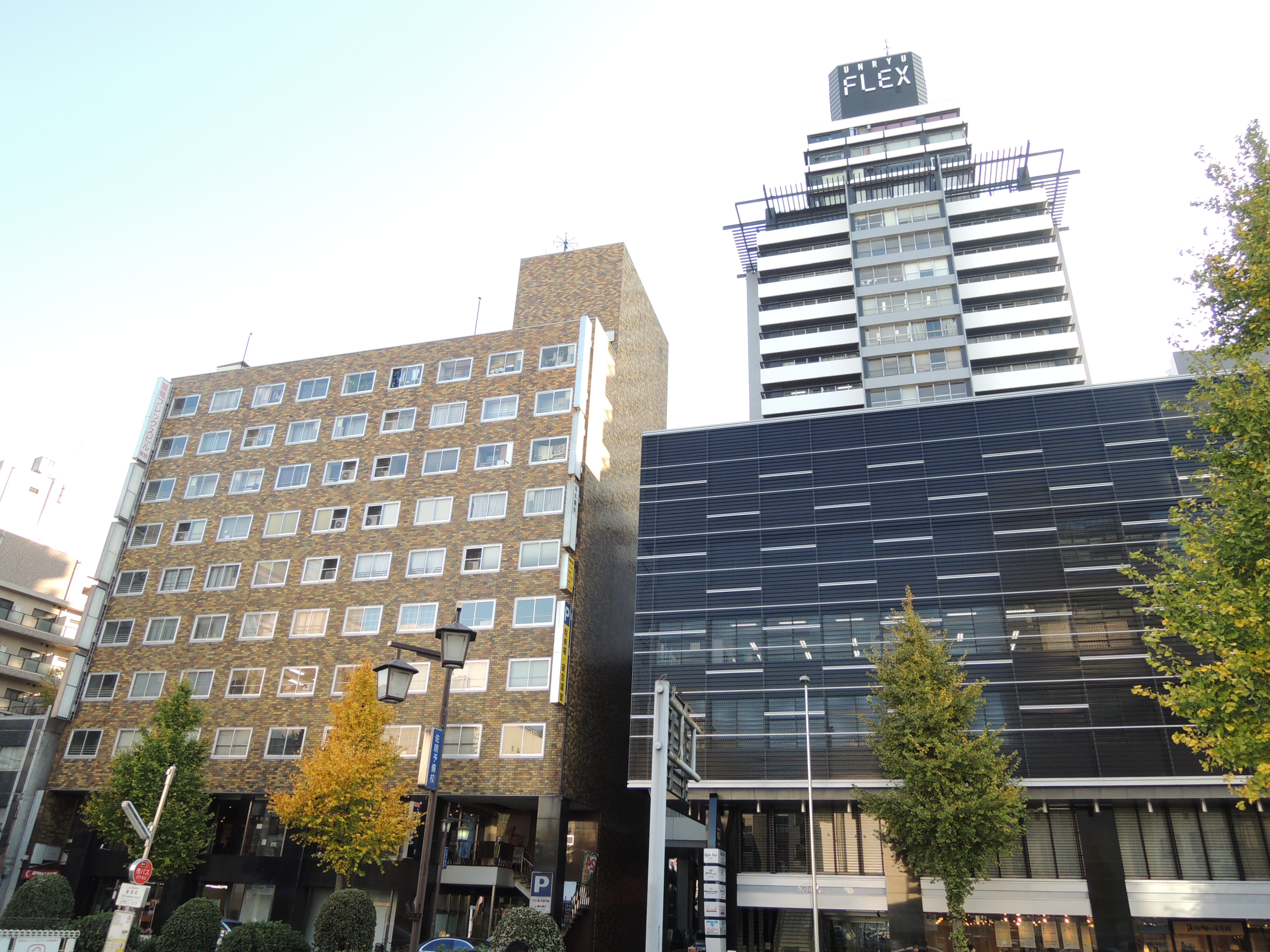
- Diamond Hall
- Interactive map of Diamond Hall
- Former names: Club Diamond Hall; Flex Hall; Unryu Hall
- Address: Nagoya; Japan
- Coordinates: 35.169495°N 136.920591°E
- Capacity: 1,014

Construction
- Opened: 1992

Website
- www.diamond.sflag.co.jp

Diamond Hall (ダイアモンドホール) is a 1,014-capacity live music venue located in Naka-ku, Nagoya, Japan. Since opening in 1992 it has hosted notable artists, such as Green Day, Sheryl Crow, Anthrax, UFO, Night Ranger, Megadeth, Tool, Porcupine Tree, Cheap Trick, Band-Maid and Sonic Youth.
