= Philip Pocock (artist) =

Canadian artist

Philip Pocock is a Canadian artist, photographer and researcher. He was born in Ottawa, Ontario, in 1954. Since the early 1990s, his work has been collaborative, situational, time-, code-, net-based and participatory.

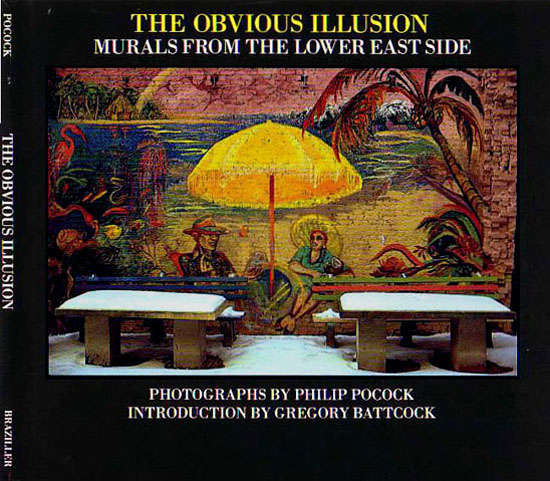
The Obvious Illusion book cover, photographs by Philip Pocock, introduction by Gregory Battcock, published by George Braziller, New York

In photography, in the 1980s, Philip Pocock produced two bodies of photographic works: lyrical documentary explorations in New York and Berlin; as well as alchemical Cibachrome photographs. In 1980, "The Obvious Illusion: Murals from the Lower East Side", a monograph of his color photographs, was published by George Braziller to accompany public exhibitions of his Cibachrome photographs at the Cooper Union, in New York, in 1980, and the Art Gallery of Ontario, in Toronto, in 1981.

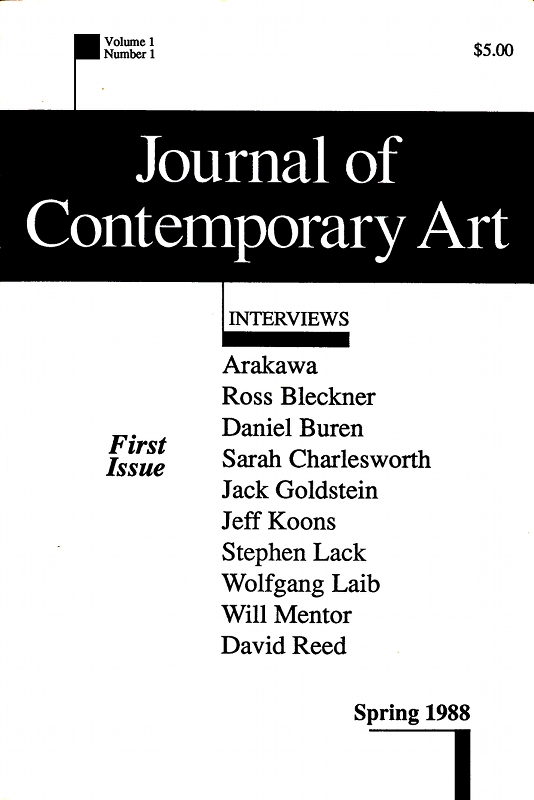
Journal of Contemporary Art, a low-cost, desktop-published art journal, 1988.

In New York City, in 1988, collaborating with the painter, John Zinsser, Philip Pocock co-founded, co-published, co-edited, and designed on an Apple Macintosh Plus and Laserwriter, the early low-cost, interview-based, desktop-published Journal of Contemporary Art, announced in the New York Times 1988-01-22.

Relocating to Europe, in 1990, Philip Pocock continued collaborative practice, painting and drawing with German artist Walter Dahn, song lyrics from American popular music sources, from the Blues to Indie, under the label Music Security Administration, in Cologne, from 1993 to 1995, before entering telecommunication space with FAX performance, database cinema and cybernetic installation from 1993 onward.

In 1993, with Swiss photographer Felix Stephan Huber, Philip Pocock extended collaborative practice with digital cameras, laptops and a Fax modem, co-producing for the Venice Biannual's Electronic Café, a digital performance and facsimile book, Black Sea Diary.

In 1995, Huber and Pocock created an art weblog, mixing regularly posted live journal, sound and video entries with emails from their users' forum on the web. Travel-art-art-as-information, a cyber-roadmovie, Arctic Circle investigates contemporary loneliness, taking the duo by van from Vancouver, British Columbia, over thousands of kilometers, to walk along the Arctic Circle in Canada's northern wilderness, simultaneously searching for any sign of life on the other side, the cyber-side, of their laptop screens. Driving, acting, uploading, what began as 1970s conceptual performance mutated into 1990s pulp melodrama when two hitchhikers, Nora and Nicolas, hopped on board, all becoming fictional characters playing in a digital documentary of their own making. Arctic Circle was produced for the traveling exhibition Fotographie nach der Fotographie, in 1995-97, included in documenta X, in 1997.

Philip Pocock was invited by documenta X's director, Catherine David, in 1996, to produce an Internet cinema piece for the event in 1997. He presented the work in the context of the documenta X - 100 Days 100 Guests event. For [ A Description of the Equator and Some ØtherLands] Philip Pocock assembled longtime collaborator, Felix Stephan Huber, Udo Noll, and Florian Wenz, to produce an early online, user-generated, database-driven hypercinematic work, which introduced the term Tag (metadata), taking Pocock and Wenz first to Uganda, then Pocock and Noll to the Java Sea to traverse the Earth's equator, and with thousands of users pursue the potential one of corresponding identities in cyberspace. A Description of the Equator and Some ØtherLands was coded with open source software: php1.0 msql on a Redhat linux operating system. Philip Pocock did not visit the site of his collaboration at the documenta X in Kassel, until he participated as a guest speaker in its 100 Days 100 Guests programme, 1997-08-23.

In 1999, with another group of collaborators, notably the Italian architecture collective, Gruppo A12, net programmer Daniel Burckhardt, Brazilian artist Roberto Cabot, Thing.net founder Wolfgang Staehle, as well as the Equator group, Philip Pocock produced H|u|m|b|o|t for the ZKM Center for Art and Media's net_condition exhibition in Karlsruhe, Germany, initiated with support from the Goethe-Institut, Caracas, Venezuela.

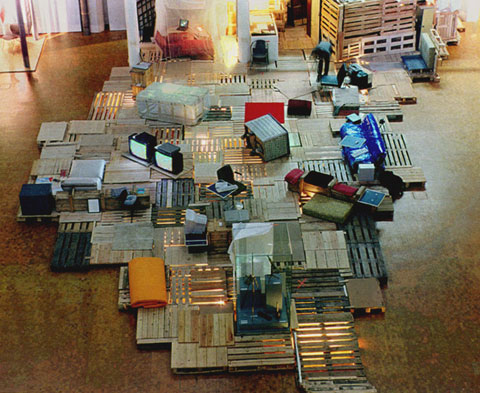
humbot installation, net_condition, ZKM Center for Art and Media, Germany, 1999.

H|u|m|b|o|t is a movie-mapping, an atlas plotted to ubiquitous screens, transmitted from a database of text and video, mapped as a single screen-world, with the help of an intelligent, self-organizing mapping algorithm from the Finnish mathematician, Teuvo Kohonen. H|u|m|b|o|ts text source was Alexander von Humboldt's scientific travelogue, Personal Narrative of a Journey to the Equinoctial Regions of the New Continent 1799–1804, each paragraph of which was specifically identified according to its Global Positioning GPS meta-data, as well as annotated with emotion, keyword and location markers, using H|u|m|b|o|ts XML editor. This meta-data translates into a topography of Humboldt's historical narrative, tagged, visually and semantically connecting clusters of text to one shared screen (FLATBOOK), collated with contemporary videos from Venezuela and Cuba by H|u|m|b|o† authors (FLATMOVIE). Together, an atlas is composed through which users travel, each logged as possible itineraries for future users. H|u|m|b|o|t was installed in Hans Ulrich Obrist's Voilà: Le monde dans la tête exhibition at the Musée d-art moderne, Paris, 2000.

In 2002, pre-YouTube, UNMOVIE, a future cinema, codes tagged, user-generated, flash video on-the-fly, the UNMOVIE Stream, mashed up from words generated by synthespian dialogue from the UNMOVIE Stage. Synthespians ([Chatterbots]) were coded from: the entire oeuvre of Bob Dylan, Beyond Good and Evil by Nietzsche, Sculpting in Time by Tarkovsky, The Philosophy of Andy Warhol by Drella, anecdotes by the 13th-century Zen master Dogen, male-female cybersex chat from Geisha, and visitors to the Stage, You_01 - 06. As the synthespians match words, some are sent to the database to cull user video to play on the 'Stage'. With info architect, Axel Heide, sculptor, Gregor Stehle, and designers, Onesandzeros, Philip Pocock produced UNMOVIE for the traveling Future Cinema: The Cinematic Imaginary After Film exhibition at ZKM Karlsruhe. UNMOVIE opened in November 2001, and has been writing itself and playing 24-7 ever since. UNMOVIE has been installed at the Kiasma, Helsinki, Finland, and the NTT InterCommunication Center (ICC) gallery, Tokyo, Japan.

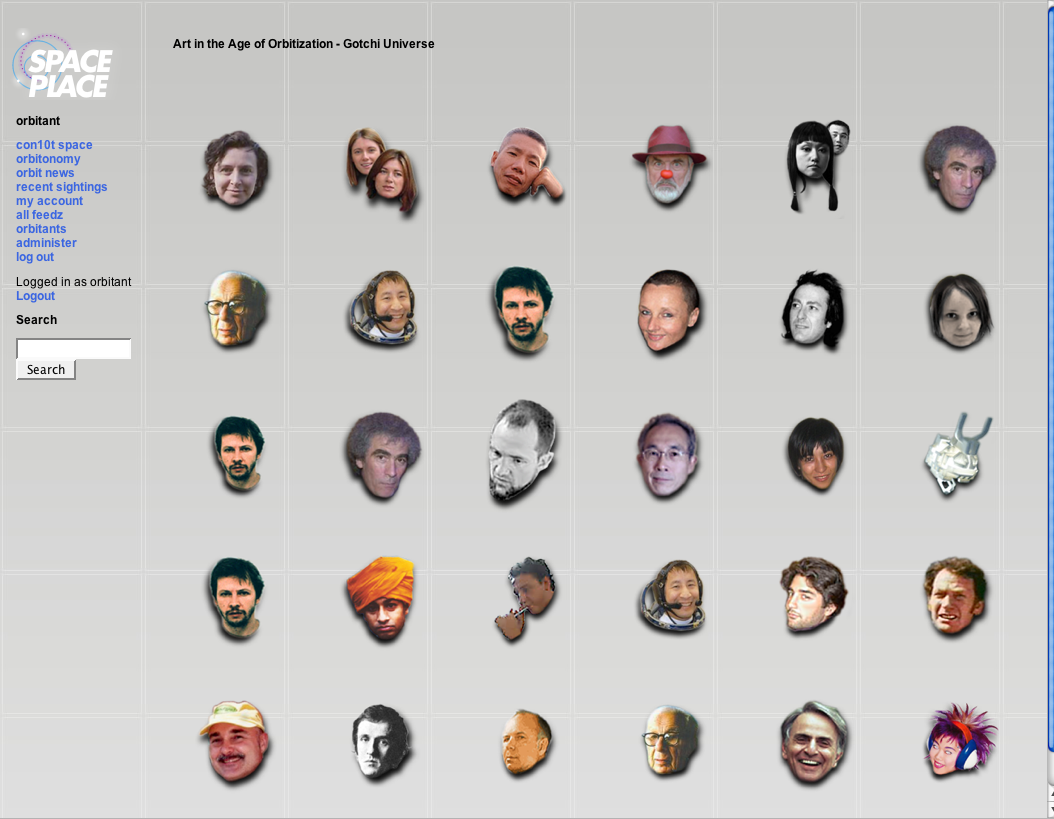
SpacePlace: Art in the Age of Orbitization, web archive screenshot

In 2006, Philip Pocock created SpacePlace: Art in the Age of Orbitization with Peter Weibel, ZKM, Axel Heide and Onesandzeros. As well as being an on-line, web2.0, Mashup (digital) and repository for Outer Space-related art and culture, the SpacePlace database generated a multimedia platform, SpacePlace mobile, as well as a dual-screen, free public access Bluetooth installation for specific locations, such as ZKMax, Munich, Germany, where urban guest were greeted by a cellphone message and projected video wobbling to the sound of outer space, opening June 7, 2006, in support of the [United Nations Office for Outer Space Affairs] conference in Vienna to check and balance peaceful and cultural utilization of near Earth orbit. and beyond.

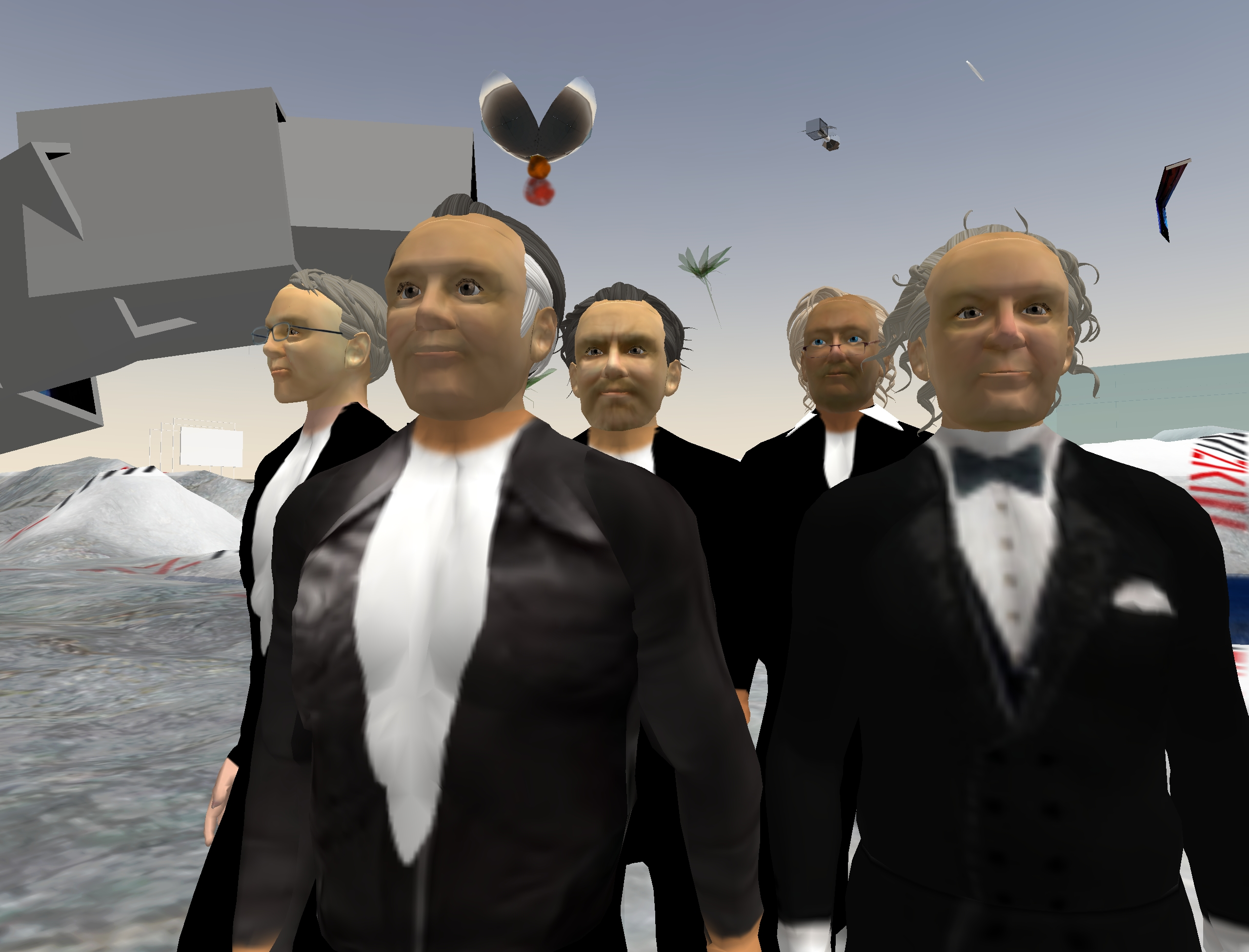
The 'Karlsruhe Kreis' (left-to-right): Boris Groys (cultural theorist), Peter Weibel (artist), Beat Wyss (art historian), Peter Sloterdijk (philosopher, Wolfgang Rihm (composer) avatars on ZKM 'YOUniverse' Island in Second Life.

Philip Pocock produced and directed in collaboration with several art and design school students and grads, the ZKM Island YOUniverse in Second Life, with cyber-robotic avatars, avatar-sensing cinema structures, participatory and converging with a Moblog and mobile media sculpture presented at the YOU_ser: The Century of the Consumer exhibition curated by Peter Weibel at ZKM, Karlsruhe. User-generated images are emailed to Second Life mashup cinemas. ZKM Island in Second Life presents vitrine architecture in a globally warmed wasteland, each supermodern structure's components simultaneously screen, wall and window, sensitive to avatar movement and orientation. A Boxing Ring where avatars can get in the ring with six German cultural theorists and philosophy cyber-robotic avatars and punch it out while waxing philosophy, just for fun.

Commissioned by the Seville Biannual (BIACS), Spain, in 2008, Philip Pocock collaboratively produced with Alex Wenger, Linus Stolz, Julian Finn, Daniel Burckhardt and other students Aland: Scopic Regimes of Uncertainty, three telescopic, participatory, multi-screen sculptures that converse incessantly and convivially. Alan∂, short for Al-Andalus, a rare moment of cultural conviviality on the Iberian Peninsula between the 8th and 15th centuries, begins with an artificially intelligent, incessant dialogue between Federico García Lorca, raised in Christian Andalusia (his 20th-century poetry), Moses Maimonides (his 11th-century book, A Guide for the Perplexed), and Muhammad Ibn Tufail (his 11th-century novel, Alive, Son of Awake) Jewish and Muslim Al-Andaluz contemporaries, driving database searches for images of Andalusia in the contemporary blogosphere, compiling them into rhythmic and subtitled video clips, which are surveilled by telescopes, the details captured, retrieving similar images from Andalusian cyberspace. In short, it is scopic media that are surveilled, and pictures looking at pictures, for pictures to display over sculpted arrays of recycled and DIY screens. Web-cams sculpturally integrated as well mix portraits of installation guests with a mashed up overabundance of Andalusia's scopic regime.
