= Hiroshi Hara (architect) =

Japanese architect (1936–2025)

- Born: Hiroshi Hara; 9 September 1936; Kawasaki, Japan
- Died: 3 January 2025 (aged 88); Japan
- Education: University of Tokyo
- Occupation: Architect
- Buildings: Umeda Sky Building; Kyōto Station

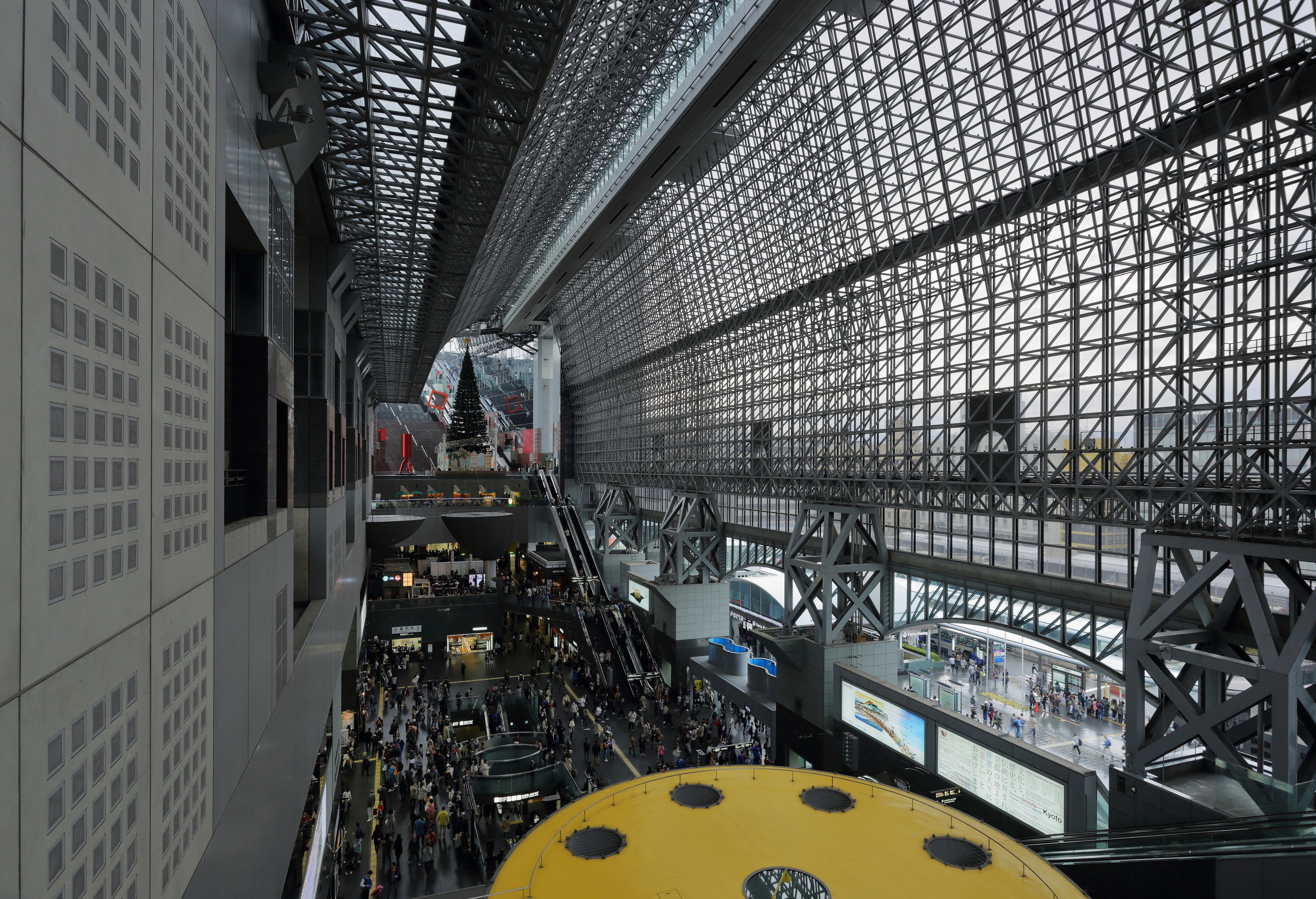
Kyōto Station, Kyoto, Japan

Hiroshi Hara (原 広司, Hara Hiroshi; 9 September 1936 – 3 January 2025) was a Japanese architect and author on architecture. His major works, including Kyōto Station, the Umeda Sky Building in Osaka, the Yamato International building in Tokyo, the Sapporo Dome in Hokkaidō, and other important structures in Japan, have earned many awards. With a doctorate in engineering, he was a professor at the University of Tokyo until 1997, and subsequently held an emeritus position.

== Life and career ==
Hiroshi Hara was born on 9 September 1936. He graduated from the University of Tokyo with a BA in 1959, and subsequently earned an MA in 1961 and a PhD in 1964, also from the University of Tokyo. He became an associate professor in the Faculty of Architecture at the University of Tokyo in 1964 and an associate professor at the Institute of Industrial Science at the University of Tokyo in 1969. He attended Harvard University's Summer Seminar in 1968. He collaborated with Atelier Φ for design practices from 1970. In 1982, Hara became professor at the Institute of Industrial Science at the University of Tokyo, and in 1997, professor emeritus at the University of Tokyo. He changed the designation to "Hiroshi Hara + Atelier Φ" from 1999.

Hara died on 3 January 2025, at the age of 88.

== Publications ==
Hara is not only known as an architect but also as an author of theoretical essays on architecture and cities, amongst others the essay "Discrete City".

- Hiroshi Hara (2009). Yet: Hiroshi Hara (in Japanese) (1st ed.). Tokyo, Japan: TOTO Pub. ISBN 9784887063075.

== Works ==
- 1974: Hara House, Tokyo
- 1986: Tasaki Museum of Art, Karuizawa, Nagano
- 1987: Naha Municipal Josei Primary School, Naha, Okinawa
- 1987: Yamato International, Ōta, Tokyo
- 1987: Kenju Park 'Forest House', Nakaniida, Miyagi Prefecture
- 1988: Iida City Museum, Iida, Nagano Prefecture
- 1992: Uchiko Municipal Ose Middle School, Uchiko, Ehime
- 1993: Umeda Sky Building, Kita-ku, Osaka
- 1997: Kyoto Station Complex, Shimogyo-ku, Kyoto
- 1998: Miyagi Prefectural Library, Sendai, Miyagi Prefecture
- 2000: Hiroshima Municipal Motomachi High School, Hiroshima
- 2001: Sapporo Dome, Sapporo, Hokkaidō
- 2001: University of Tokyo, Komaba II Campus, Tokyo
- 2003: Tokamachi Stage, Tokamachi, Niigata
- 2004: Casa Experimental, Montevideo, Uruguay
- 2005: Casa Experimental, Cordoba, Argentina
- 2005: Shimokita Snow-Resistant Dome, Mutsu, Aomori
- 2007: Aizu Gakuho Middle School and High School, Aizuwakamatsu, Fukushima Prefecture
- 2010: Casa Experimental, La Paz, Bolivia
