= Péter Halász (actor) =

Hungarian actor, director and playwright (1943–2006)

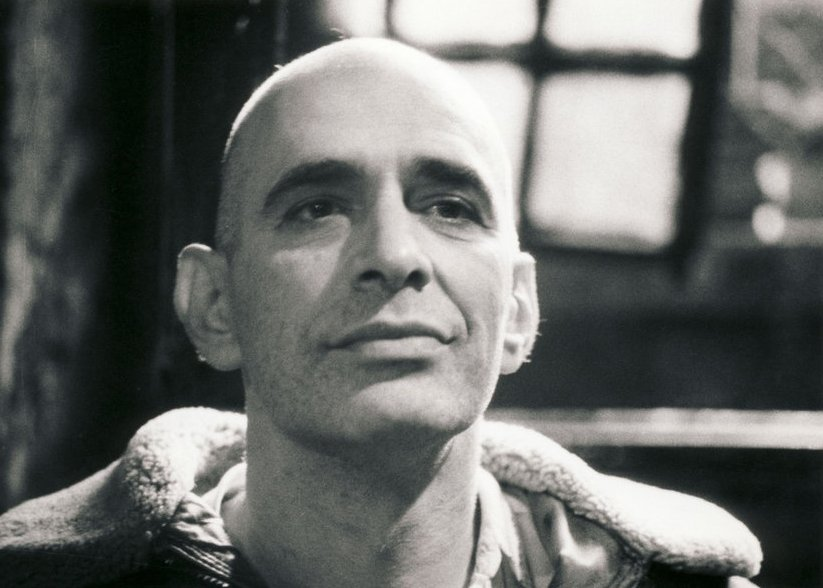
- Born: August 20, 1943; Budapest, Kingdom of Hungary
- Died: March 9, 2006 (aged 62); Brooklyn, New York, U.S.
- Occupations: Actor and director
- Years active: Circa 1965–2006
- Known for: Squat Theatre co-founder, actor. Theatre actor, director. Movie actor

Péter Halász (August 20, 1943 in Budapest – March 9, 2006 in New York City) was a Hungarian actor, director and playwright. In 1993 he won the Hungarian Film Critics Awards for Best Actor. He founded several theater companies in Budapest and New York City including the Kassák Haz Studió, the "appartement theatre", Squat Theatre, Love Theatre and Varosi Szinhaz. As a film actor he appeared Fat Man and Little Boy (1989), Sunshine (1999 film) (1999), and The Breed, among others. In February, 2006 his terminal liver cancer led to his final performance: lying in an open coffin in a Budapest art museum. He died a month after at the age of 62. He had four children: Judith Halasz, Cora Fisher, Gabor Halasz, and David Halasz.

== Plays ==
- 1972 The Puppet Theatre of Péter Halász
- 1975 Guido and Tyrius, a play by Eva Buchmuller and Péter Halász.
- 1975-79 Three Sisters by Anton Chekhov
- 1977 Pig, Child, Fire!, a play in five parts. The first, a drama based on the confessions of Nikolai Stavrogin in Dostoyevsky's Demons. The second is inspired by 1940s American Gangster films. The third is a comic act.
- 1978 Andy Warhol's Last Love, Ulrike Meinhof meets Andy Warhol in 3 acts: Aliens on the Second Floor, An Imperial Message and Interview With the Dead.
- 1981 Mr. Dead & Mrs. Free, film and live show in a storefront, 1981.
- 1981 The Battle of Sirolo. Open air version of Mr. Dead & Mrs. Free. Premiere at Polverigi Festival (Inteatro Festival, Polverigi.
- 1982 The Golden Age of Squat Theatre. A retrospective of three Squat Theatre plays : Pig, Child, Fire!, Andy Warhol's Last Love and Mr. Dead & Mrs. Free.
- 1987 Ambition. by Péter Halász.

== Films ==
- 1975 Minotaur in a Sand Mine 20 minutes, B&W, 16mm. Budapest, Biennale de Paris.
- 1975 Don Juan von Leporello. 60 minutes, B&W, 16mm Budapest, Düsseldorf.
- 1977 Pig, Child, Fire! 1981, 60 min, color, sound, 16mm
- 1978 Andy Warhol's Last Love, An Imperial Message, 2nd part of play. 1978-81, 60 min, b&w and color, sound, 16mm. Directed by Stephan Balint and Péter Halász, Performance Camera: Larry Solomon. 'An Imperial Message' camera: Michel Auder. Michael Mooser, cinematography. Editor: Roughcut Studio. Music: Blondie (band), Kraftwerk. Appearance by Kathleen Kendel as the White Witch.
- 1981 Mr. Dead & Mrs. Free. 43 minutes, color, 16mm. Part of the play, Mr. Dead & Mrs. Free exhibited separately, Hamburg, Abaton Cinema, Berlin. Künstlerhaus; Yale University. Directed by Stephan Balint and Péter Halász. Péter Halász, cinematography.
- 1982 A Matter of Facts by Eric Mitchell
- 1982 A Matter of Facts 1982 by Eric Mitchell w/ Squat Theatre (Archival) 17 minutes, 45 seconds, color, 16mm. Starring Stephan Balint, Klara Palotai, Boris Major, Péter Halász, Peter Berg, Eric Daillie, Anna Koós, Eszter Balint, Vince Pomilio, Phillipe Pagasky and Arto Lindsay. Mr. Dead & Mrs. Free.
- 1983 Tscherwonez. Directed by Gabor Altorjay. With Stephan Balint, Peter (Breznyik) Berg, Péter Halász and Eva Buchmuller of Squat Theatre.
- 1989 Fat Man and Little Boy (a.k.a. Shadow Makers in the UK) is a 1989 film that reenacts the Manhattan Project, the secret Allied endeavour to develop the first nuclear weapons during World War II. The film is named after the weapons Little Boy and Fat Man that were detonated over Hiroshima and Nagasaki, respectively. The film was directed by Roland Joffé and written by Joffe and Bruce Robinson.
- 1993 Senkifoldje. Directed by Andras Jeles.
- 1999 Sunshine (1999 film) is a historical drama film directed by István Szabó and written by Israel Horovitz and Szabó. It won three European Film Awards, including Best Actor for Fiennes, and three Canadian Genie Awards, including Best Motion Picture.
- 1999 Simon the Magician Directed by Ildikó Enyedi.
- 2004 A Mohacsi Vesz Directed by Miklós Jancsó.
- 2006 Herminafield: Apparitions. Director, Producer, Screenwriter Péter Halász.

== Notes ==
1.The name Squat-Love Theater as it appears in Mel Gussow's October 4, 1987 New York Times article, "Theater: 'Ambition, By Halasz," was legally contested as breach of copyright by Squat Theatre. The name of Halász theatre was changed to Love Theatre.
