= Stephan Balint =

- Born: István Bálint; 11 July 1943; Budapest, Hungary
- Died: 11 October 2007 (aged 64); Budapest, Hungary
- Other name: Pisti
- Occupations: Actor; writer; theatre director
- Years active: Circa 1972–1991
- Known for: Squat Theatre co-founder, actor, playwright, director. Film actor and screenwriter
- Notable work: Dreamland Burns, L-Train to Eldorado

Full Moon Killer
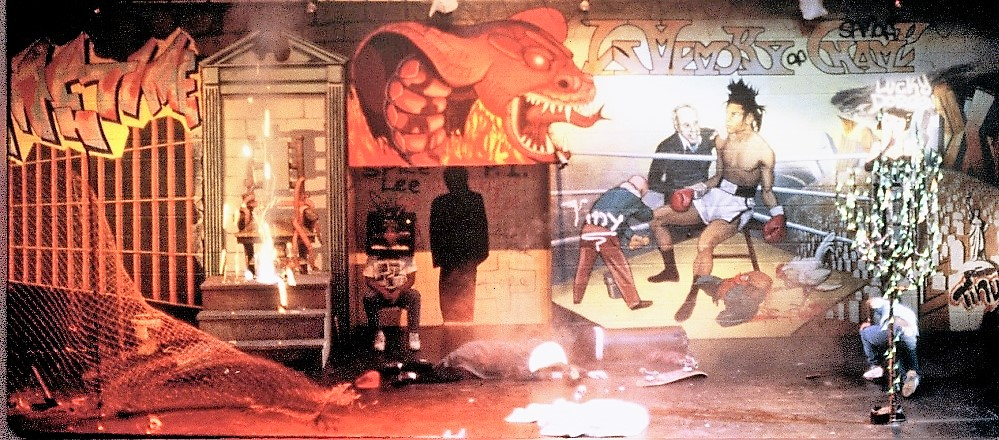
- Written and directed by Stephan Balint. Sets and set design by Eva Buchmuller. Lighting by Michael Chybowski, 1990

István Bálint (11 July 1943 – 11 October 2007) was a writer, actor, theatre director, and playwright. Balint was co-founder of New York's Squat Theatre where he wrote, acted, and directed L-Train to Eldorado and Full Moon Killer.

== Life ==
Istvan Balint was the son of poet and artist Endre Balint. Balint was the founding member of a theater group called the Squat Theater, who performed in the living room of a house after being denied a public broadcast license by the communist regime of Hungary. The group grew into a collective that became well-known to younger artists throughout Budapest for trying to invent a new type of avant-garde production. In 1976, Balint, along with a number of other artists in the collective, toured theater festivals throughout Europe with the troupe, before relocating to New York City in mid-1977, where he changed his name to Stephan. The troupe finally settled in a theater in Chelsea, Manhattan where they became famous throughout the late 1970s and 1980s.

Among the plays Balint co-wrote, co-directed, and performed in were Pig! Child! Fire!, Andy Warhol's Last Love, and Mr. Dead & Mrs. Free.

He also acted in several films, including Hunter, directed by Robert Frank, written by himself; American Stories: Food, Family and Philosophy in 1989; and The Golden Boat in 1990.

== Later life and death ==
Balint returned to Budapest in the early 1990s, continuing his work until the start of his long illness in 2002, dying in 2007 of pneumonia. He was survived by his daughter Eszter Balint, his son Gaspar Balint who lives in Budapest, and his grandson August Balint DuClos, who lives in New York.

== Plays ==
- 1975-79 Three Sisters by Anton Chekhov.
- 1977 Pig, Child, Fire!, a play in five parts. The first, a drama based on the confessions of Nikolai Stavrogin in Dostoyevsky's Demons. The second is inspired by 1940s American gangster films. The third is a comic act.
- 1978 Andy Warhol's Last Love, Ulrike Meinhof meets Andy Warhol in 3 acts: Aliens on the Second Floor, An Imperial Message and Interview With the Dead.
- 1981 Mr. Dead & Mrs. Free, film and live show in a storefront, 1981.
- 1981 The Battle of Sirolo. Open air version of Mr. Dead & Mrs. Free. Premiere at Polverigi Festival (Inteatro Festival, Polverigi.) Written, Produced, and Directed by Squat Theater.
- 1982 The Golden Age of Squat Theatre. A retrospective of three Squat Theatre plays: Pig, Child, Fire!, Andy Warhol's Last Love and Mr. Dead & Mrs. Free.
- 1985-86 Dreamland Burns. Written and directed by Balint. Sets and set design by Eva Buchmuller. Commissioned by Massachusetts Council for the Arts - New Works Grant. Performed at John F. Kennedy Center for the Performing Arts, Washington, D.C.; Montreal, Munich, Zürich, Polverigi International Festival; Boston, Theatre der Welt, Frankfurt, The Kitchen, NYC; Los Angeles; Chicago; Milan Ottre Festival; Monserrato, Cagliari.
- 1985-86 L-Train to Eldorado. Written and directed by Balint. Commissioned by the Brooklyn Academy of Music and Art Bureau Munich, Next Wave Festival, BAM (Brooklyn Academy of Music, CAL Performances, Berkeley, California; Hunter Playhouse, NYC; Boston, Amherst, Massachusetts; Vienna Festival; Holland Festival; Theatre der Welt, Hamburg; Zürich Theatre Spektakel.
- 1990-91 Full Moon Killer. Written and directed by Balint. Sets and set design by Eva Buchmuller. Part of the trilogy Killing Time, a work in progress: The Kitchen, NYC.

== Films ==
- 1975 Minotaur in a Sand Mine 20 minutes, B&W, 16mm. Budapest, Biennale de Paris.
- 1975 Don Juan von Leporello. 60 minutes, B&W, 16mm Budapest, Düsseldorf.
- 1977 Pig, Child, Fire! 1981, 60 min, color, sound, 16mm
- 1978 Andy Warhol's Last Love, An Imperial Message, 2nd part of play. 1978-81, 60 min, b&w and color, sound, 16mm. Directed by Balint and Péter Halász, Performance Camera: Larry Solomon. 'An Imperial Message' camera: Michel Auder. Michael Mooser, cinematography. Editor: Roughcut Studio. Music: Blondie (band), Kraftwerk. Appearance by Kathleen Kendel as the White Witch.
- 1981 Mr. Dead & Mrs. Free. 43 minutes, color, 16mm. Part of the play Mr. Dead & Mrs. Free exhibited separately, Hamburg, Abaton Cinema, Berlin. Künstlerhaus; Yale University. Directed by Balint and Halász. Péter Halász, cinematography.
- 1982 A Matter of Facts 1982 by Eric Mitchell w/ Squat Theatre (Archival) 17 minutes, 45 seconds, color, 16mm. Starring Stephan Balint, Klara Palotai, Boris Major, Péter Halász, Peter Berg, Eric Daillie, Anna Koós, Eszter Balint, Vince Pomilio, Phillipe Pagasky and Arto Lindsay. Mr. Dead & Mrs. Free. courtesy of Squat Theatre.
- 1983 Tscherwonez. Directed by Gabor Altorjay. With Stephan Balint, Peter (Breznyik) Berg, Péter Halász and Eva Buchmuller of Squat Theatre.
- 1985 Let Me Love You, 36 minutes, B&W, 16mm. Part of the play Dreamland Burns exhibited at Montreal, International Festival of New Cinema & Video. (Festival du nouveau cinéma). With Shirley Clarke, Richard Leacock and August Darnell. Directed by Stephan Balint.
- 1985 American Stories, Food, Family and Philosophy (French: Histoires d'Amérique) is a 1989 Belgian drama film directed by Chantal Akerman. It was entered into the 39th Berlin International Film Festival. The film deals with Jewish identity in the center of the U.S.A. Eszter Balint also acted in the film.
- 1989 Hunter Directed by Robert Frank. Written by Stephan Balint. Cast, Stephan Balint and Gunter Burchert.
- 1989 Day One Directed by Joseph Sargent. Writers: Peter Wyden (book), David W. Rintels (teleplay).
- 1990 The Golden Boat Written and Directed by Raúl Ruiz.

== Publication ==
- Manifesto. by István Bálint on behalf of studio kassak and published in Schmuck, Hungary, March/April 1973 issue.
- New Observations. Guest Editors Eva Buchmuller and Stephan Balint. Copyright 1986, New Observations Ltd. and the authors, all rights reserved. ISSN 0737-5387

== Awards ==
- 1978 – Obie Award, for outstanding achievement for Pig, Child, Fire
- 1979 – Grand Prix at BITEF, Belgrade International Theatre Festival, Belgrade
- 1979 – Best Foreign Theatre Performance of the Year, Italian Critics Award for Andy Warhol's Last Love
- 1981 – Best American Play–Obie Award for Mr. Dead & Mrs. Free
- 1983 – Special Obie Award, Grand Prize
- 1985 – Star of the Week by Hamburger Abendblatt for Dreamland Burns
- 1989 – New York Foundation for the Arts Fellowship (NYFA) to writer director Balint and set designer Eva Buchmuller
