= Victor Vasarely =

Hungarian-French artist (1906–1997)

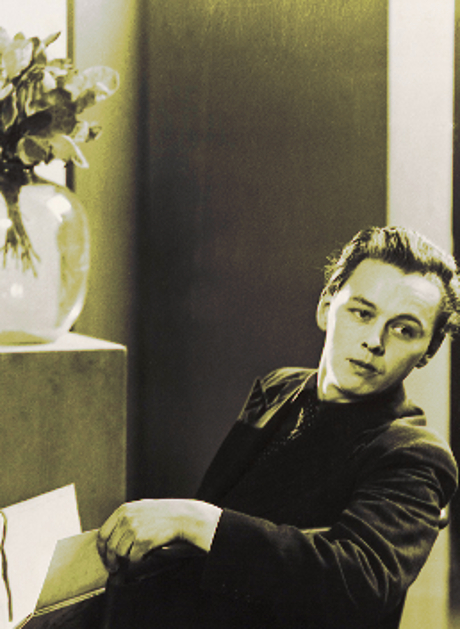
- Vasarely c. 1930
- Born: Győző Vásárhelyi; 9 April 1906; Pécs, Austria-Hungary
- Died: 15 March 1997 (aged 90); Paris, France
- Education: Műhely
- Known for: Painting, sculpture
- Notable work: Zebra (c. 1930s)
- Movement: Op art
- Website: www.vasarely.com

Victor Vasarely (French: [viktɔʁ vazaʁeli]; born Vásárhelyi Győző, Hungarian: [ˈvaːʃaːrhɛji ˈɟøːzøː]; 9 April 1906 – 15 March 1997) was a Hungarian-French artist, who is widely accepted as a "grandfather" and leader of the Op art movement.

His work titled Zebra, created in 1937, is considered by some to be one of the earliest examples of Op art.

== Life and work ==
Vasarely was born in Pécs and grew up in Piešťany (then Pöstény) and Budapest, where, in 1925, he took up medical studies at Eötvös Loránd University. In 1927, he abandoned medicine to learn traditional academic painting at the private Podolini-Volkmann Academy. In 1928/1929, he enrolled at Sándor Bortnyik's private art school called Műller (lit. "Workshop", in existence until 1938), then widely recognized as Budapest's center of Bauhaus studies. Cash-strapped, the műhely could not offer all that the Bauhaus offered. Instead, it concentrated on applied graphic art and typographical design.

In 1929, he painted his Blue Study and Green Study. In 1930, he married his fellow student Claire Spinner (1908–1990). Together they had two sons, Andre and Jean-Pierre. Jean-Pierre was also an artist and used the professional name 'Yvaral'. He worked for a ball-bearing company in accounting and designing advertising posters in Budapest. Vasarely became a graphic designer and a poster artist during the 1930s combining patterns and organic images.

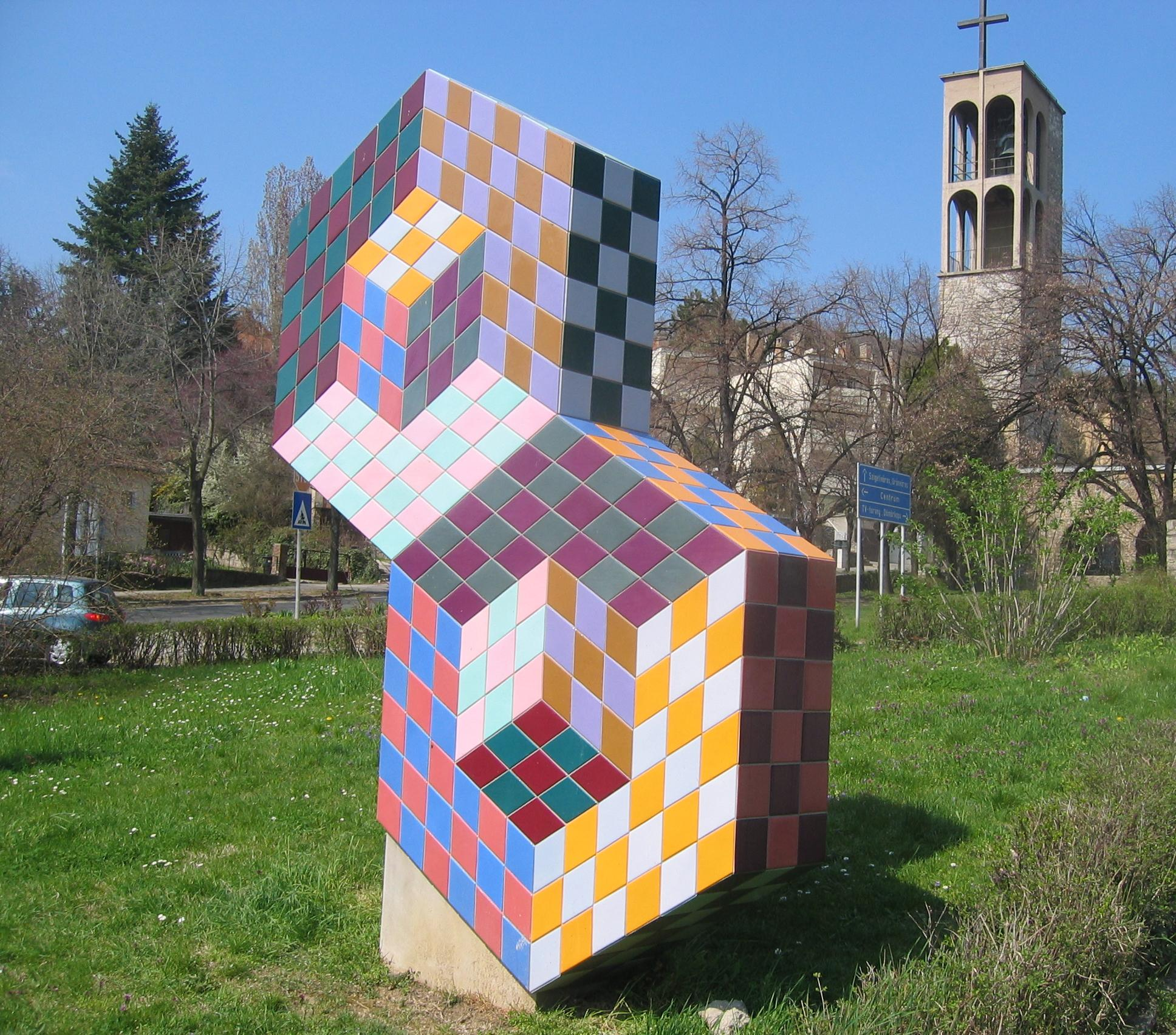
Sign Sculpture (1977)Outdoor Vasarely artwork at the church of Pálos in Pécs.

Vasarely left Hungary and settled in Paris in 1930. He worked as a graphic artist and as a creative consultant at the advertising agencies Havas, Draeger, and Devambez (1930–1935). His interactions with other artists during this time were limited. He thought of opening an institution modeled after Sándor Bortnyik's műhely and developed some teaching material for it. Having lived mostly in cheap hotels, he settled in 1942/1944 in Saint-Céré in the Lot département. After the Second World War, he opened an atelier in Arcueil, a suburb about 10 kilometers from the center of Paris (in the Val-de-Marne département of the Île-de-France). In 1961, he finally settled in Annet-sur-Marne (in the Seine-et-Marne département).

Vasarely eventually went on to produce art and sculpture using optical illusion. Over the next three decades, Vasarely developed his style of geometric abstract art, working in various materials but using a minimal number of forms and colours:

- 1929–1944: Early graphics: Vasarely experimented with textural effects, perspective, shadow, and light. His early graphic period resulted in works such as Zebras (1937), Chess Board (1935), and Girl-power (1934).
- 1944–1947: Les Fausses Routes – On the wrong track: During this period, Vasarely experimented with cubistic, futuristic, expressionistic, symbolistic and surrealistic paintings without developing a unique style. Afterwards, he said he was on the wrong track. He exhibited his works in the gallery of Denise René (1946) and the gallery René Breteau (1947). Writing the introduction to the catalogue, Jacques Prévert placed Vasarely among the surrealists. Prévert creates the term imaginaries (images + noir, black) to describe the paintings. Self Portrait (1941) and The Blind Man (1946) are associated with this period.
- 1947–1951: Developing geometric abstract art (optical art): Finally, Vasarely found his own style. The overlapping developments are named after their geographical heritage. Denfert refers to the works influenced by the white tiled walls of the Paris Denfert – Rochereau metro station. Ellipsoid pebbles and shells found during a vacation in 1947 at the Breton coast at Belle Île inspired him to the Belles-Isles works. Since 1948, Vasarely usually spent his summer months in Gordes in Provence-Alpes-Côte d'Azur. There, the cubic houses led him to the composition of the group of works labelled Gordes/Cristal. He worked on the problem of empty and filled spaces on a flat surface as well as the stereoscopic view.

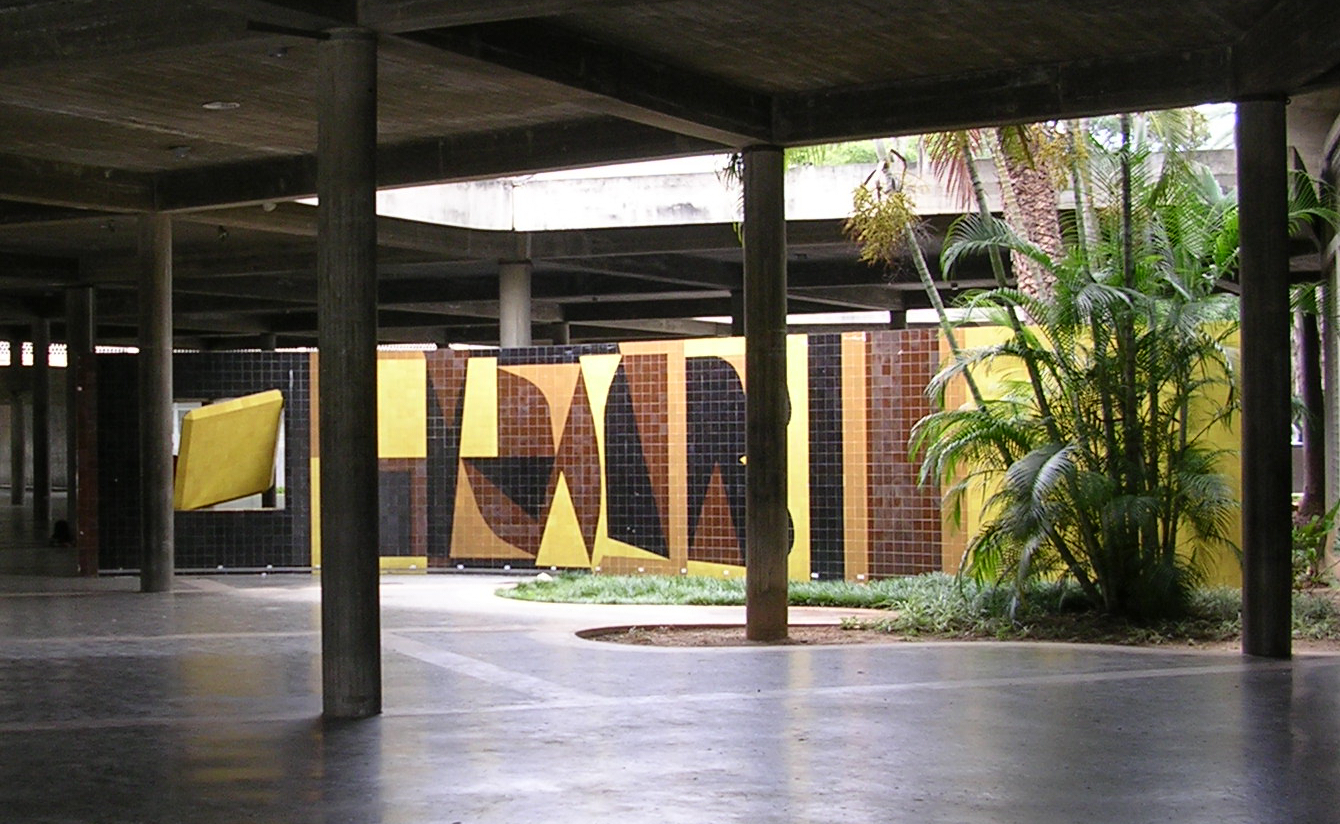
Tribute to Malevitch (1954), Ciudad Universitaria de Caracas

- 1951–1955: Kinetic images, black-white photographies: From his Gordes works he developed his kinematic images, superimposed acrylic glass panes create dynamic, moving impressions depending on the viewpoint. In the black-white period he combined the frames into a single pane by transposing photographies in two colors. Tribute to Malevitch, a ceramic wall picture of 100 m^{2} (1,100 sq ft) adorns the University of Caracas, Venezuela which he co-designed in 1954 with the architect Carlos Raúl Villanueva, is a major work of this period. Kinetic art flourished and works by Vasarely, Calder, Duchamp, Man Ray, Soto, Tinguely were exhibited at the Denise René gallery under the title Le Mouvement (the motion). Vasarely published his Yellow Manifest. Building on the research of constructivist and Bauhaus pioneers, he postulated that visual kinetics (plastique cinétique) relied on the perception of the viewer who is considered the sole creator, playing with optical illusions.

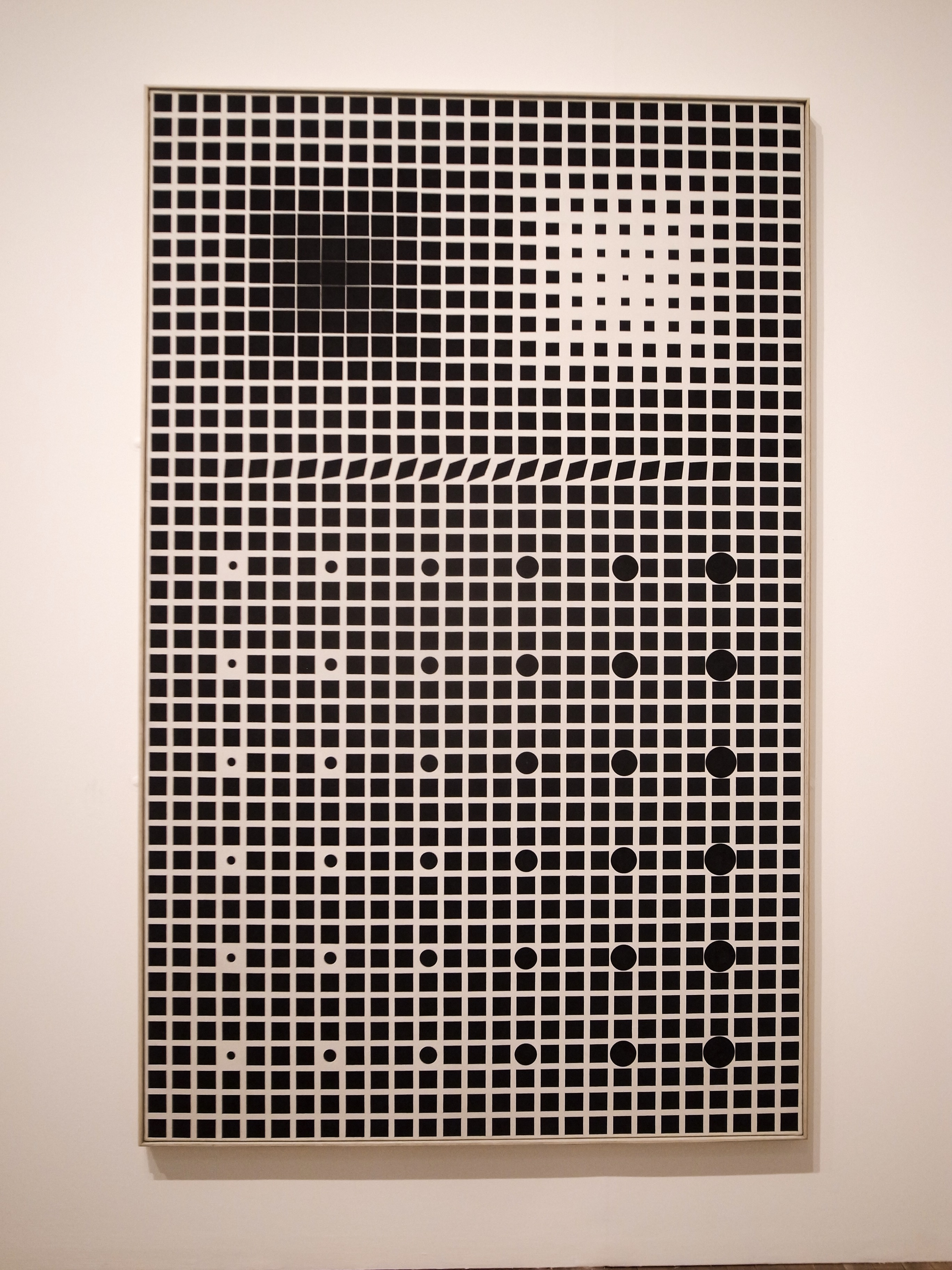
Supernovae (1959–61) in Tate Modern

- 1955–1965: Folklore planétaire, permutations, and serial art: On 2 March 1959, Vasarely patented his method of unités plastiques. Permutations of geometric forms are cut out of a coloured square and rearranged. He worked with a strictly defined palette of colours and forms (three reds, three greens, three blues, two violets, two yellows, black, white, gray; three circles, two squares, two rhomboids, two long rectangles, one triangle, two dissected circles, six ellipses) which he later enlarged and numbered. Out of this plastic alphabet, he started serial art, an endless permutation of forms and colours worked out by his assistants. (The creative process is produced by standardized tools and impersonal actors which questions the uniqueness of a work of art.) In 1963, Vasarely presented his palette to the public under the name of Folklore planetaire.
- 1965–: Hommage à l'hexagone, Vega: The Tribute to the hexagon series consists of endless transformations of indentations and relief adding color variations, creating a perpetual mobile of optical illusion. In 1965 Vasarely was included in the Museum of Modern Art exhibition The Responsive Eye, created under the direction of William C. Seitz. His Vega series plays with spherical swelling grids creating an optical illusion of volume.

Kezdi-Ga, 1970, Screenprint in colours, Edition of 250, 50.8 cm × 50.8 cm (20.0 in × 20.0 in)

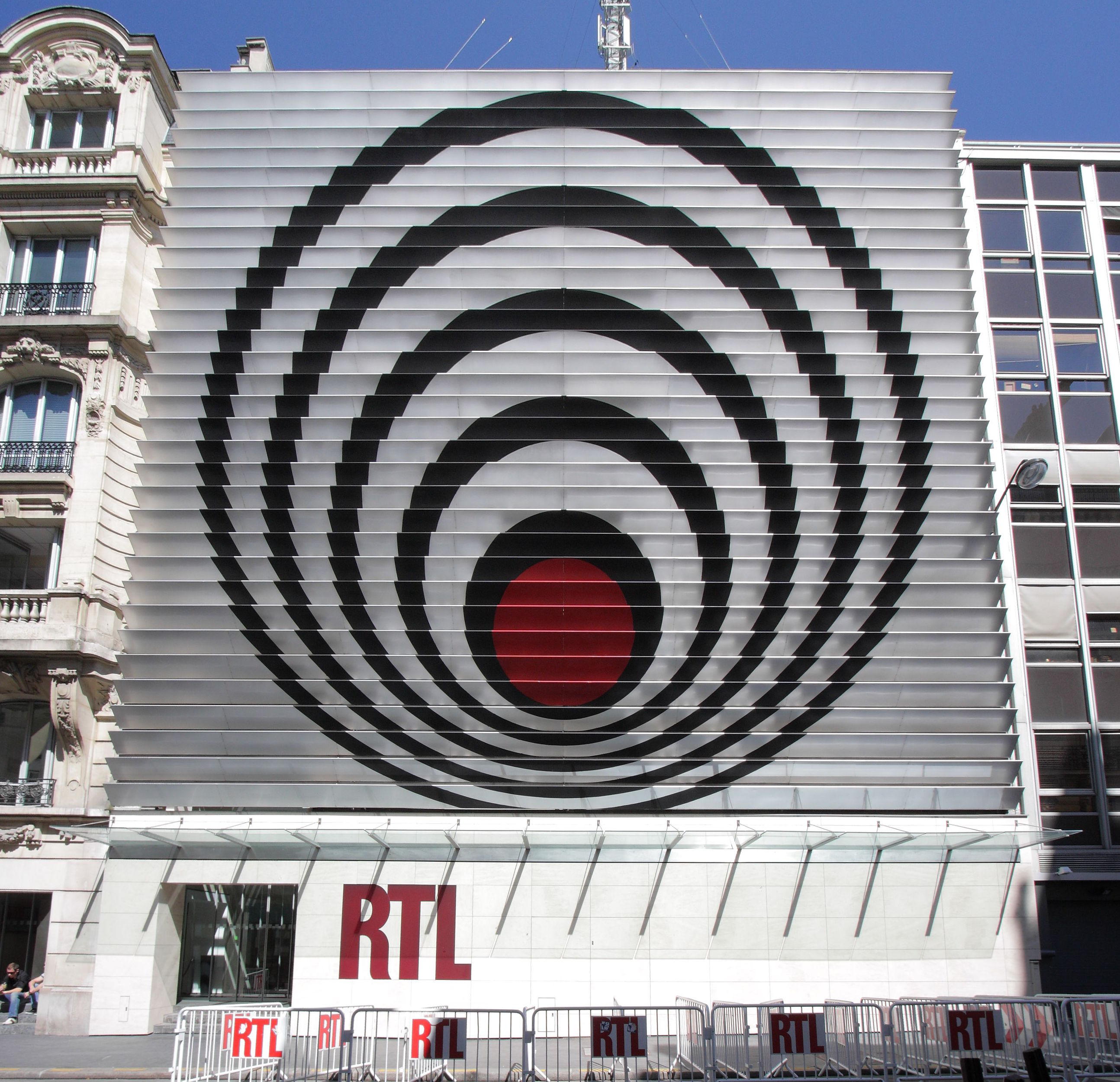
Facade of RTL radio headquarters in Paris, aluminium blinds with graphics and backlight, 1972

In October 1967, designer Will Burtin invited Vasarely to make a presentation to Burtin's Vision '67 conference, held at New York University. On 5 June 1970, Vasarely opened his first dedicated museum with over 500 works in a renaissance palace in Gordes (closed in 1996). A second major undertaking was the Foundation Vasarely in Aix-en-Provence, a museum housed in a distinct structure specially designed by Vasarely. It was inaugurated in 1976 by French president Georges Pompidou, two years after his death. The museum is now in a state of disrepair, several of the pieces on display have been damaged by water leaking from the ceiling. Also, in 1976 his large kinematic object Georges Pompidou was installed in the Centre Pompidou in Paris and the Vasarely Museum located at his birthplace in Pécs, Hungary, was established with a large donation of works by Vasarely. In the same decade, he took a stab at industrial design with a 500-piece run of the upscale Suomi tableware by Timo Sarpaneva that Vasarely decorated for the German Rosenthal porcelain maker's Studio Linie. In 1982, 154 specially created serigraphs were taken into space by the cosmonaut Jean-Loup Chrétien on board the French-Soviet spacecraft Salyut 7 and later sold for the benefit of UNESCO. In 1987, the second Hungarian Vasarely museum was established in Zichy Palace in Budapest with more than 400 works.

He died age 90 in Paris on 15 March 1997.

== Legacy ==
The original British cover for David Bowie's second album David Bowie (1969, also called Space Oddity) features Vasarely's work in the background.

From 14 January - 23 April 2000, the Fundación Juan March, Madrid exhibited Vasarely, the first exhibition of his work exhibited in Spain. The exhibit included 47 paintings and drawings made between 1929 and 1988. The exhibit was also shown at the Centro Atlántico de Arte Moderno, Las Palmas de Gran Canaria (31 May - 16 July 2000) and Colegio Oficial de Arquitectos de Canarias, Santa Cruz de Tenerife (24 July - 9 September 2000).

A new Vasarely exhibit was mounted in Paris at Musée en Herbe in 2012.

In 2019, a temporary exhibition of Vasarely's work titled Le Partage des Formes was displayed in the Centre Georges Pompidou in Paris.

Inaugurated in July 2024, a permanent exhibition of Vasarely's work in the Arkas Collection is being displayed in the Arkas Art Center in Alaçatı.

== Awards ==
- 1964: Guggenheim Prize
- 1970: French Chevalier de L'Ordre de la Légion d'honneur
- Art Critics Prize, Brussels
- Gold Medal at the Milan Triennial

Museum Fondation Vasarely in Aix-en-Provence

== Museums ==
- 1970–1996: Vasarely Museum in the Saint-Firmin Palace in Gordes, Vaucluse, France (closed in 1996)
- 1976: Fondation Vasarely, Aix-en-Provence, France
- 1976: Vasarely Museum, Pécs, Hungary
- 1987: Vasarely Museum, Zichy Palace, Óbuda, Budapest, Hungary

== See also ==
- Groupe de Recherche d'Art Visuel
- M. C. Escher
- Janos Major
