= János Major =

- Born: May 8, 1934; Budapest, Hungary
- Died: June 12, 2008 (aged 74); Budapest, Hungary
- Resting place: Kozma Street Cemetery; 47°28′22.25″N 19°10′46.04″E
- Education: Hungarian University of Fine Arts
- Known for: Tombstone photographs, drawings and etchings
- Spouse(s): Eva Buchmuller, divorced
- Website: evabuchmuller.wixsite.com/janos

János Major (Budapest, May 8, 1934 – June 12, 2008) was a Hungarian graphic artist, painter and photographer from Budapest. He was born as Janos Neufeld to a Jewish family in Budapest.

From 1947 to 1950, he attended a private school, and later, a High School for Fine and Applied Arts. In 1950, his mother married Bela Major, which made him and his sister adopt the name Major as their last name. Upon high school graduation, he got accepted to the Academy of Fine Arts in Budapest where he studied graphic reproduction: etching, lithography, and woodcut under Karoly Koffan. His diploma work in 1959 was etchings of women workers at an electronics factory. He married and later divorced, Eva Buchmuller. He is survived by their two daughters, Rebecca and Borbala Major.

== Career ==
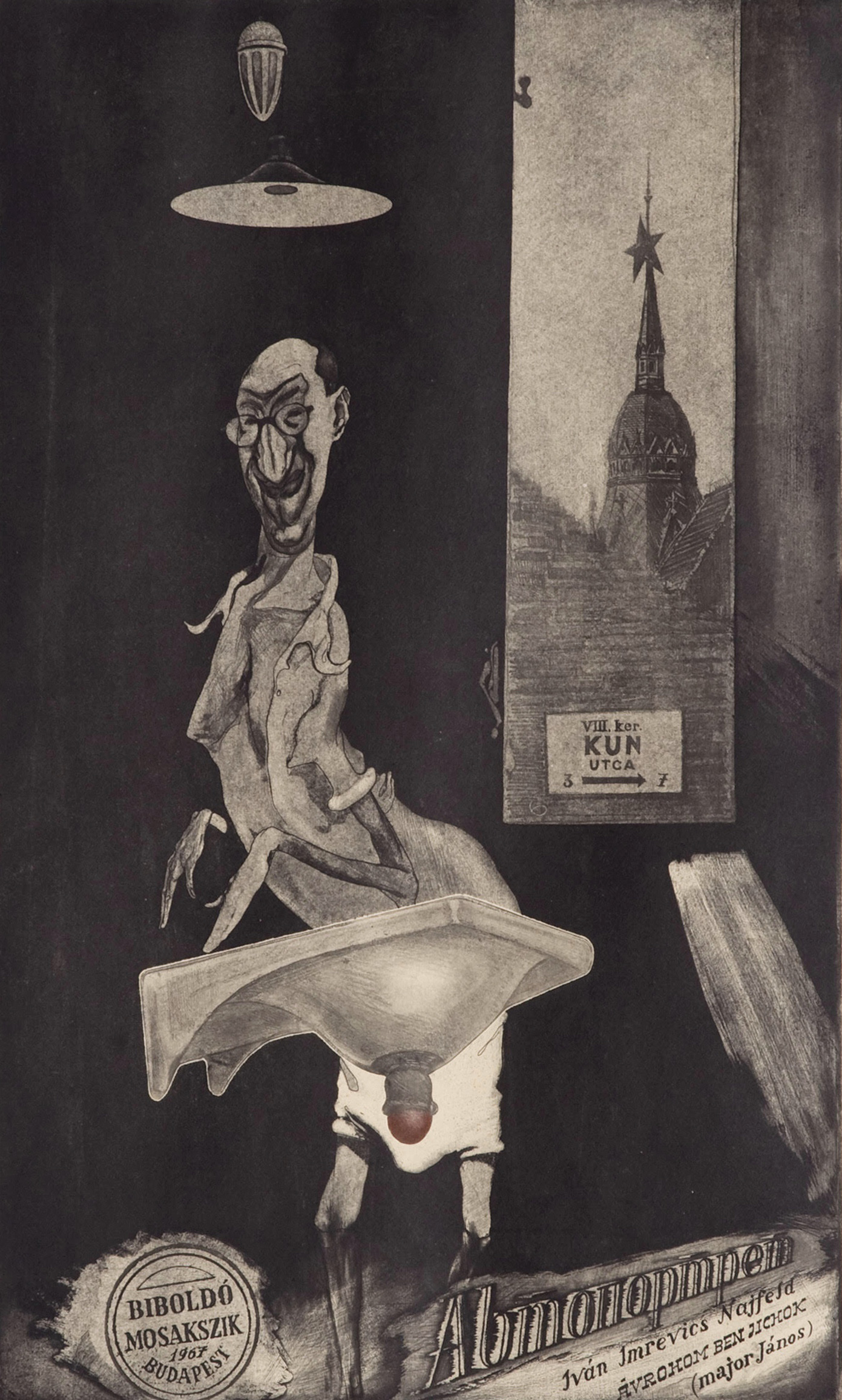
The Yid is Washing Himself (Aftoportret), etching, 1967

In the 1960s, he experimented with mezzotint, line engraving, aquatint, acids on steel plates, and imprints into vernis mou. His epic etching In Memoriam of Moric Scharf, a reference to a famous Hungarian blood libel case, to the Holocaust, and to Renate Muller. In the late 1960s, he began to photograph tombstones, producing hundreds of black and white prints. Some photos informed his drawings while others inspired conceptual work.

He produced art that was grotesque, (self) ironic, absurd sexual engagements blend with Jewish and political motifs. (Note: "János Major depicted his own Jewishness with a surprising freedom and a ruthless self-mockery. By appropriating the language of anti-semitic representations, by rendering his own Jewishness in a grotesque manner, he probed the meaning of anti-semitism, and the attempts of processing Holocaust trauma and its failures.") In the 1980s, he became interested in perspective illusion. He has dealt with the subconscious and taboo.

He staged a one-man protest on October 18, 1969, at Victor Vasarely's retrospective exhibition at the Mücsarnok gallery in Budapest. Janos walked around the exhibit with a one-inch sign under his lapel and showed it only to friends: Vasarely Go Home.

In 1976, Major destroyed a significant portion of his work. The same year, he became associated with the Budapest History Museum as an archaeological draftsman and did not resume his own work for a decade.

His late work consists of tombstone photography, drawings, and comics. These drawings make use of a certain perspective representation he called 'coincidences,' resulting in absurd misperception (with pornographic overtones).

== Exhibitions ==
Source: Veri, Daniel. March 2013. Leading the Dead – The World of Major Janos, MTVA Press. ISBN 978-963-7165-49-8.

1969 – Fényes Adolf Room, Budapest, Hungary (with István Bencsik and Ilona Keserü Ilona)
1989 – Óbuda Pincegaléria, Budapest
1996 – Budapest History Museum, Budapest
1997 – Körmendi Gallery, Budapest (floor)
1997 – Goethe Institute, Budapest
1997 – Goethe Institute, Budapest
2000 – Dorottya Street Gallery, Budapest
2001 – Szinnyei Salon
2006 – Museum Kiscelli – Municipal Picture Gallery
2007 – Petofi Literary Museum
2012 – 2B Gallery
2013 – Hungarian University of Fine Arts

== Group ==
Source: Veri, Daniel. March 2013. Leading the Dead – The World of Major Janos, MTVA Press. ISBN 978-963-7165-49-8.

1961 – I. National Graphic Biennial, Miskolc / Studio '61, Budapest
1964 – MTA Central Physical Research Institute, Budapest / Fényes Adolf Hall, Budapest (with István Bencsik, Ilona Keserü)
1966 – Studio '66, Budapest / Europahaus, Vienna / Tombstone Photographs (János Major, Péter Donáth, Gábor Karátson), Central Physics Research Institute, Budapest
1965 – Technical University of Budapest R Building, Budapest
1968 – Budapest University of Technology, Budapest / Central Physics Research Institute Club, Budapest / Graphic Exhibition, János Vignola / Major, Ilona Keserü, István Bencsik, Adolf Hall Fényes, Budapest / Industrial Design II, IPARTERV, Budapest
1969 – Hungarian exhibition, Essen
1970 – R-exhibition, Building R, Technical University of Budapest, Budapest / Künstler aus Ungarn, Baukunst, Cologne
1971 – Tombstone Photography, Central Physics Research Institute, Budapest
1973 – Chapel of the Balatonboglár, Balatonboglár
1999 – Perspective, Műcsarnok, Budapest.

== Awards ==
Source: Veri, Daniel. March 2013. Leading the Dead – The World of Major Janos, MTVA Press. ISBN 978-963-7165-49-8.

1990 – Honorary Professor, Hungarian University of Fine Arts.
1990 – State Prize, Meritorious Artist.
2002 – Klára Herczeg Prize.
2007 – Janos Major Prize. Founder NETRAF – Tamas St. Auby. The prize began in 1998 in his honor.

== Bibliography ==
Source: Veri, Daniel. March 2013. Leading the Dead – The World of Major Janos, MTVA Press. ISBN 978-963-7165-49-8.

László Beke: Introduction to János Major's Photographs of Tombs-with an English Summary, 1972.
Karátsony G .: János Major's graphic work, Art, 1974/7.
Emese Krunák: The forerunner of avant-garde graphics. János Major art, Art, 1987/5.
Éva Körner: Grotesque victim. János Major's erotic art, New Art, 1997 / 5–6.
Antal István: Major league – János Major Prózavers, New Art, 1997 / 5–6.
Peter Sinkovits: Self-portrait in Distortion Mirror. Conversation with János Major, New Art, 1997 / 5–6.
Major János: (Kat. Bev., Körmendi Gallery, 1997)
Tamás Szőnyei: Light, dark. Major János Graphic Artist, MANCS, 2000/3.

== See also ==
- Victor Vasarely
