= Squat Theatre =

Hungarian theatre company

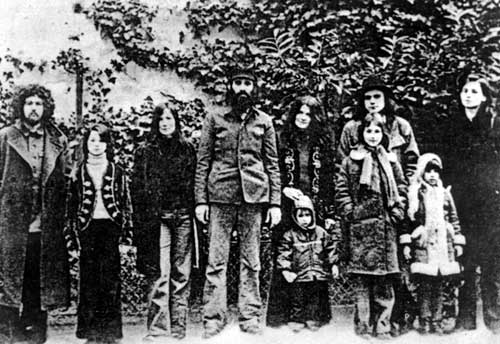
- Company in Paris, 1976
- Formation: 1977, Budapest-Paris-Rotterdam
- Dissolved: 1991, New York City
- Type: Theatre group
- Purpose: experimental, provocative
- Location: 256 W 23rd Street, NYC
- Members: Peter (Breznyik) Berg, Marianne Kollar, Péter Halász, Anna Koós, Stephan Balint, Eva Buchmuller, Eric Daille, Agnes Santha, Klara Palotai, Eszter Balint, Boris Major, Rebecca Major, Judith Galus Halasz,
- Artistic director: Eva Buchmuller
- Notable members: Stephan Balint, Peter (Breznyik) Berg, Péter Halász
- Website: http://squattheatre.com/index2.html

Squat Theatre (1977–1991) was a Hungarian theatre company from Budapest which left Hungary for Paris and then New York City, where they performed experimental theatre.

== History ==
Living in Paris in 1977, a friend of the company, Tamas Szentjoby, suggested that they change the name from Kassák Haz Studió to Squat Theatre. (Note: The name Squat-Love Theater as it appears in Mel Gussow's October 4, 1987 New York Times article, "Theater: 'Ambition, By Halasz," was legally contested as breach of copyright by Squat Theatre. The name of Halász theatre was changed to Love Theatre.) The first play was created for a Western audience: Pig, Child, Fire! It was set in a storefront in Rotterdam, a setting that became their trademark. After touring Nancy, France, Shiraz, Baltimore, Paris, the company arrived at the Hotel Chelsea in July, they settled in New York City. Several members left the company in 1985 when they lost the lease to their space on 23rd Street including Anna Koós, Péter Halász, Eric Daille, and Agnes Santha. The rest of the company continued until 1991, Squat Theatre's last play was Full Moon Killer, 1991, performed at The Kitchen in New York City.

=== Founding members ===
The six founding members of Squat Theatre (shown left to right in the 1976 Paris photograph) are Peter (Breznyik) Berg, Marianne Kollar (3rd), Péter Halász, Anna Koós, Stephan Balint and Eva Buchmuller. (Note: "Squat Theatre—whose core members included Stephan Balint, Peter Berg, Eva Buchmuller, Peter Halasz and Anna Koos—was a major presence in the downtown art and theater world of New York, where the group lived and worked from 1977 until 1985. After emigrating from Budapest, Hungary, where their performances were banned, they lived and performed in a storefront on 23rd Street. Squat's radical theater questioned role-playing, the act of spectatorship, and the boundaries between art and life, the fictive and the real.") Other members of Squat Theatre were: Eric Daillie, Agnes Santha, Klara Palotai, Eszter Balint, Boris Major, Rebecca Major, and Judith Galus Halasz. Important contributing actors were Sheryl Sutton, Sandi Fiddler, Kathleen Kendall, Nico, Yossi Gutmann (viola), Shirley Clarke, Richard Leacock, August Darnell, Mark Boone Junior, Sue Williams, Jane Smith, Larry Solomon, Ivan Jakovits and Jan Gontarczyk. Boris and Rebecca Major are the daughters of János Major. (Note: The core of the company stayed together from 1970 to 1985 and included Stephan Balint, Peter Berg (b. 1947), Eva Buchmuller (b. 1943), Péter Halász (1943-2006), and Anna Koos (b. 1948).)

Originally, the company was known as Kassák Haz Studió and was located at Uzsoki-utca 57, Budapest. For political and aesthetic reasons, the company emigrated to Paris and then to the United States. (Note: They arrived in New York City with their goat, first living at the Hotel Chelsea.) In 1969 Anna Koós, Péter Halász and Stephan Balint from the University Theatre of Budapest created an independent theatre group called Kassák Haz Studió. In 1972 they were censored by the Hungarian authorities for "political and esthetic radicalism", and banned from performing in public. In the next four years they wrote 36 performance events: plays, sketches and improvisations. These were shown in apartments, staircases, streets, beaches, and in the countryside. "Manifesto" by István Bálint (Stephan Balint) on behalf of Studio Kassak was published in Schmuck, Hungary, March–April, 1973 issue.

== Audiences ==
The building at 256 West 23rd Street had a large window on the sidewalk with a street entrance this provided the possibility of having two audiences, one inside and one outside. The spectators sat in the back of the space facing the storefront window and 23rd street beyond. Events took place with the street as a backdrop, with the intention of unsettling the events, the relationship among the members of the theatre group, and the audience. This set-up was first used in Rotterdam at 129a Van Oldenbarneveltstraat in the show Pig, Child, Fire!, which was commissioned by the Toneelraad Rotterdam. On 23rd Street they lived, worked and performed from 1977 to 1985. (Note: Guest they invited to perform at the 23rd street space included DNA. Sun Ra, The Lounge Lizards, John Cale and Nico, among other.)

=== 1973 to 1985 ===
Various plays were performed in 1973 including Alice and Her Sisters, Tribute to Miron Bialoszewski performed at the Polish Cultural Center in Budapest. Birds and Red Epaulets, Éva Buchmüller sings a Jewish song as the Virgin Mary holding Can Togay on her lap in the position of Michelangelo's Pieta.

The Three Sisters by Anton Chekhov was performed for the first time at Dohány utca 20, Budapest. They used as text the abridged version of the original play limited to the lines of the three sisters. The company left Hungary for the West.

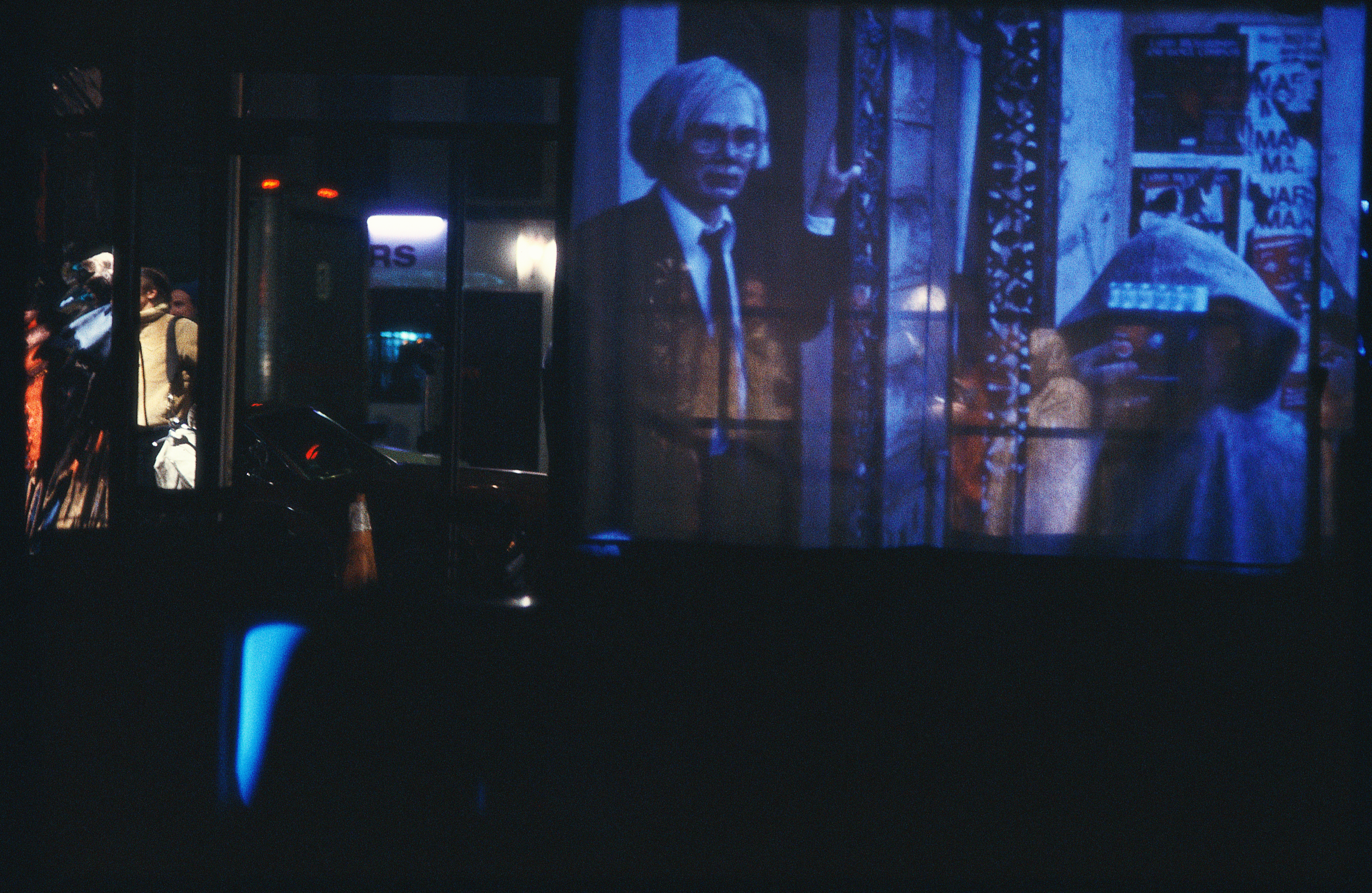
Andy Warhol's Last Love, 1978

Andy Warhol's Last Love was collectively created and opened on 23rd Street in 1978. The Company went on tour to Hamburg, Rome. Milan, Florence, Belgrade, Rotterdam and Brussels. It won a Grand Prix at the Belgrade International Theatre Festival (BITEF), and the Italian Critics’ Award for the Best Foreign Performance.

In 1981 Mr Dead & Mrs Free premiered in Cologne, Germany. Commissioned by Ivan Nagel director of Theater der Welt and shown at Cologne’s "Theatres of the World" festival, Mr. Dead & Mrs. Free was filmed by Rainer Werner Fassbinder as part of his first and only documentary Theater in Trance. It was also shown in New York City and Amsterdam. The show had a year-and-a-half performance run on 23rd Street. It was awarded an Obie Award (1982) for the Best New American Play. It received a The Villager (Manhattan) Award. An open-air version of the show, The Battle of Sirolo was performed in August in Polverigi, Italy. In the summer of 1985 the theatre lost the eight-year lease of their home and performance space on 23rd Street.

== Plays ==
- 1975–79 – Three Sisters by Anton Chekhov Three men dressed in white are the Sisters, sitting in a group, sipping vodka as a prompter reads their lines, the actors repeat the words. (Note: Irina Péter Halász (actor) Masha Peter Breznyik Olga Istvan Balint (Stephan Balint) Viola Player Yossi Gutmann)
- 1977 – Pig, Child, Fire!, a play in five parts. The first, a drama based on the confessions of Nikolai Stavrogin in Fyodor Dostoevsky's Demons. The second is inspired by 1940s American Gangster films. The third is a comic act.
- 1978 – Andy Warhol's Last Love.Ulrike Meinhof meets Andy Warhol in 3 acts: Aliens on the Second Floor, An Imperial Message and Interview With the Dead.
- 1981 – Mr. Dead & Mrs. Free, 1981.
- 1981 – The Battle of Sirolo. Open-air version of Mr. Dead & Mrs. Free. Premiere at Polverigi Festival (Inteatro Festival, Polverigi.)
- 1982 – The Golden Age of Squat Theatre. A retrospective of three Squat Theatre plays Pig, Child, Fire!, Andy Warhol's Last Love, and Mr. Dead & Mrs. Free. (Note: A retrospective of three Squat Theatre plays: Pig, Child, Fire!, Andy Warhol's Last Love, and Mr. Dead & Mrs. Free. Shown at 23 Street storefront.)
- 1985–86 – Dreamland Burns. (Note: Dreamland Burns. Written and directed by Stephan Balint. Art, stage and set design by Eva Buchmuller. Commissioned by Massachusetts Council for the Arts - New Works Grant.Performed at John F. Kennedy Center for the Performing Arts, Washington, D.C.; Montreal, Munich, Zurich, Polverigi International Festival; Boston; Theatre der Welt, Frankfurt; The Kitchen, NYC; Los Angeles; Chicago; Milan Ottre Festival; Monserrato, Cagliari.)
- 1985–86 – L-Train to Eldorado. (Note: L-Train to Eldorado. Written and directed by Stephan Balint. Music by Peter Scherer and Arto Lindsay. Art, stage and set design by Eva Buchmuller. Commissioned by the Brooklyn Academy of Music and Art Bureau Munich, Next Wave Festival, BAM (Brooklyn Academy of Music), Cal Performances, Berkeley, California; Hunter Playhouse, NYC; Boston, Amherst, Massachusetts; Vienna Festival; Holland Festival, the Netherlands; Theatre der Welt, Hamburg; Zurich Theatre Spektakel.)
- 1990–91 – Full Moon Killer. (Note: Full Moon Killer. Written and directed by Stephan Balint, art and set design by Eva Buchmuller. Performed at The Kitchen, NYC.)

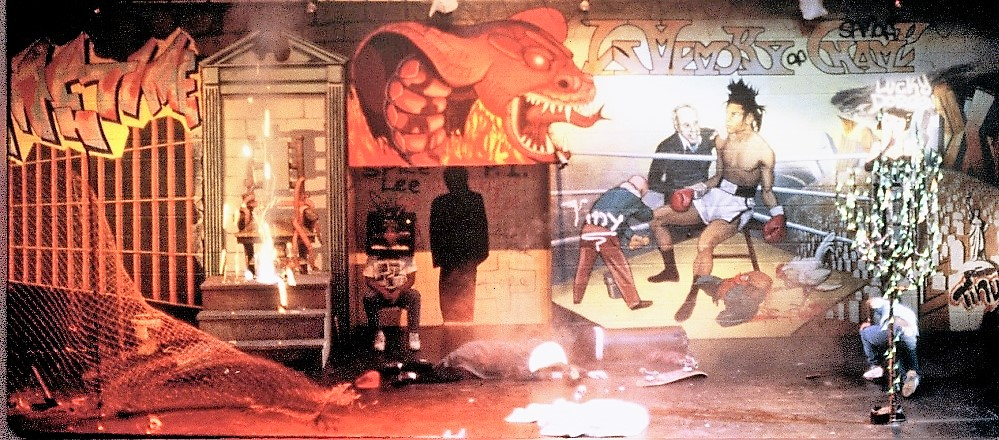
Set of Full Moon Killer, 1991.

== Filmography ==
- Minotaur in a Sand Mine (1975), 20 minutes, B&W, 16mm, Budapest, Biennale de Paris.
- Don Juan von Leporello (1975), 60 minutes, B&W, 16mm, Budapest, Düsseldorf.
- Andy Warhol's Last Love, (1978), An Imperial Message, 2nd part of play. 1978–81, 60 min, b&w and color, sound, 16mm. (Note: Directed by Stephan Balint and Péter Halász, Performance Camera: Larry Solomon. 'An Imperial Message' camera: Michel Auder. Michael Mooser, cinematography. Editor: Roughcut Studio. Music: Blondie (band), Kraftwerk. Appearance by Kathleen Kendel as the White Witch.)
- Mr. Dead & Mrs. Free. (1981), 43 minutes, color, 16mm. Part of the play Mr. Dead & Mrs. Free exhibited separately, Hamburg, Abaton Cinema, Berlin. Künstlerhaus; Yale University. Directed by Stephan Balint and Péter Halász. Péter Halász, cinematography.
- A Matter of Facts (1982) by Eric Mitchell w/ Squat Theatre (Archival). 17 minutes, 45 seconds, color, 16mm. (Note: Starring Stephan Balint, Klara Palotai, Boris Major, Péter Halász, Peter Berg, Eric Daillie, Anna Koós, Eszter Balint, Vince Pomilio, Phillipe Pagasky and Arto Lindsay.)
- Tscherwonez. (1983), Directed by Gabor Altorjay. With Stephan Balint, Peter (Breznyik) Berg, Péter Halász and Eva Buchmuller.
- Let Me Love You, (1985), 36 minutes, B&W, 16mm. Directed by Stephan Balint. Part of the play Dreamland Burns. Exhibited at Montreal, International Festival of New Cinema & Video. (Festival du nouveau cinéma). With Shirley Clarke, Richard Leacock and August Darnell.

== Videos ==
- 1981 – Pig, Child, Fire! 60 min, color, sound.
- 1982 – Mr Dead & Mrs Free 10 minutes, color 3/4". (Note: Presented in Canada, Beaubourg, Paris. The Kitchen, NYC.)
- 1982 – Andy Warhol's Last Love 53 minutes, color 3/4". (Note: Promotional music video. Lary Solomon, videographer. Centre Pompidou, Paris; Kitchen, New York.)
- 1982 – Mr Dead & Mrs Free 60 minutes, color 3/4". Presented in Berlin, Yale University.
- 1986 – L-Train to Eldorado 60 minutes, color 3/4".
- 1989 – L-Train To Eldorado 90 minutes, color 3/4".
- 1989 – Major Productions 60 minutes, color 3/4".
- 1991 – Full Moon Killer 45 minutes, color 3/4".

== Exhibits ==
- 1982 – Mr Dead & Mrs Free's Cafe, MoMA PS1, Long Island City. Exhibition by Eva Buchmuller and Stephan Balint.
- 1982 – The Moments Before The Tragedy, The Kitchen, New York City. Exhibition by Eva Buchmuller and Stephan Balint.
- 1984 – Suspense, Hallwalls, Buffalo, New York. Exhibition by Eva Buchmuller and Stephan Balint.
- 1984 – A Painted Show, Postmasters Gallery, New York City. Exhibition by Eva Buchmuller and Stephan Balint.
- 1996 – Mr. Dead & Mrs. Free: A History of Squat Theatre (1969 – 1991), Artists Space, New York City. Exhibition by Eva Buchmuller.
- 2004 – An Exhibition of Photography by Endre Kovacs, Kassák House Studio – Squat Theatre: Photos of the History of the Hungarian Underground Theatre. September 9 to October 10, 2004. Ludwig Museum Budapest. Curated by Dr. Vera Baksa-Soos.
- 2013–14 – Rituals of Rented Island, Whitney Museum, New York City. Exhibition by Eva Buchmuller with Osvaldo Valdes, Architect.

== Awards ==
- 1978 – OBIE Award,' for outstanding achievement for Pig, Child, Fire
- 1978 – OBIE Award to Eva Buchmuller, Sustained Excellence of Stage Design
- 1979 – Grand Prix, Belgrade International Theatre Festival, Belgrade
- 1979 – Best Foreign Theatre Performance of the Year', Italian Critics Award for Andy Warhol's Last Love
- 1982 – OBIE Award, Best American Play, Mr. Dead & Mrs. Free
- 1985 – Star of the Week by Hamburger Abendblatt for Dreamland Burns
- 1986 – Bessie Awards to Eva Buchmuller/Squat Theatre for visuals of Dreamland Burns.
- 1988 – American Theatre Wing Award to Eva Buchmuller. Award for Noteworthy/unusual effects for scenic design of Dreamland Burns
- 1986 – American Theatre Wing Award to Eva Buchmuller for art and stage design of L Train To El Dorado
- 1988 – OBIE Award to Eva Buchmuller for sustained excellence in set design for Squat Theatre.
- 1989 – New York Foundation for the Arts Fellowship to Stephan Balint and set designer Eva Buchmuller

== Gallery ==
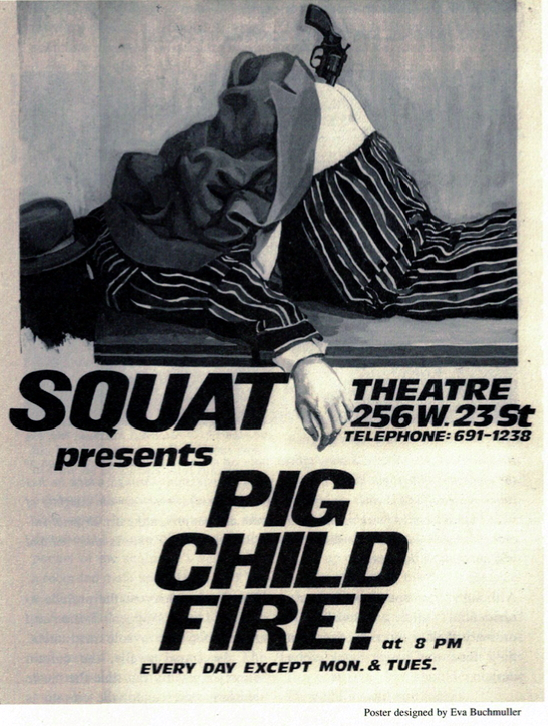
Pig Child Fire!, poster, 1977

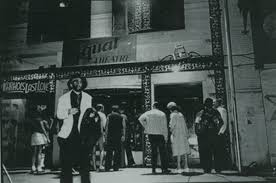
Peter Berg in front of 256 West 23rd Street. Andy Warhol's Last Love, 1978

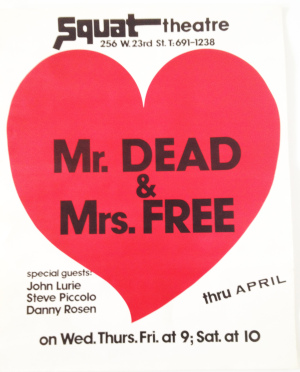
Mr Dead & Mrs. Free, poster, 1982

== See also ==
- Three Sisters (play)
- Experimental theatre
- Stephan Balint
- Eszter Balint
- Péter Halász (actor)
- Ulrike Meinhof

== Bibliography ==
- Buchmuller, Eva; Koos, Anna (1996). Squat Theatre. New York, New York: Artists Space. ISBN 0-9636372-2-3.
- Koos, Anna (2015). "Squat Theatre: Staging Life/Living on Stage". PAJ: A Journal of Performance and Art. 35 (3): 24–40. doi:10.1162/PAJJ_a_00158. JSTOR 26376140. S2CID 57561119.

== Archives ==
- University of California, Davis Special Collections
  - Ms. Daryl Morrison, Head, Special Collections / videos, documents, set pieces.
- Országos Színháztörténeti Intezet manuscripts, videos. address: 1013, Budapest Krisztina körút 57.
- National Theatre History Museum and Institute. manuscripts, videos. address: 1013, Budapest Krisztina körút 57.
- Library for the Performing Arts at Lincoln Center video archive collection
- EAI Electronic Arts Intermix Video collection
  - Andy Warhol's Last Love 1978–81, 60 min, b&w and color, sound. EAI Electronic Arts Intermix, 13 July 2018 (UTC)
  - Mr. Dead & Mrs. Free 1982, 83 min, b&w and color, sound. EAI Electronic Arts Intermix, 13 July 2018 (UTC)
  - Pig, Child, Fire! 1981, 60 min, color, sound. EAI Electronic Arts Intermix, 13 July 2018 (UTC).
