= Patrizia Casagrande Esposto =

Italian politician (1951–2017)

President of the Province of Ancona
- In office 28 May 2007 – 12 October 2014
- Preceded by: Enzo Giancarli
- Succeeded by: Liana Serrani

Personal details
- Born: 26 October 1951 Senigallia, Italy
- Died: 12 December 2017 (aged 66) Senigallia, Italy

Patrizia Casagrande Esposto (26 October 1951 – 12 December 2017) was an Italian politician and member of the Democratic Party. She served as the President of the Province of Ancona from 28 May 2007 until 12 October 2014.

Casagrande died on 12 December 2017, at the age of 66.
