= The Linguini Incident =

1991 American crime comedy film directed by Richard Shepard

- Directed by: Richard Shepard
- Written by: Tamar Brott; Richard Shepard
- Produced by: Sarah Jackson; Arnold Orgolini
- Starring: Rosanna Arquette; David Bowie; Eszter Balint; Marlee Matlin; Buck Henry; Viveca Lindfors
- Cinematography: Robert Yeoman
- Edited by: Sonya Polonsky
- Music by: Thomas Newman
- Distributed by: Academy Entertainment
- Release dates: October 30, 1991 (France); May 1, 1992 (United States)
- Running time: 98 minutes
- Country: United States
- Language: English
- Budget: $4 million

The Linguini Incident (also released on home video as Houdini and Company, The Robbery, Shag-O-Rama) is a 1991 American crime comedy film set in New York starring Rosanna Arquette and David Bowie. The film was directed by Richard Shepard, who co-wrote the script with Tamar Brott. The title refers to linguini, a type of pasta.

== Plot ==
A British bartender, Monte, hopes to marry Lucy, a waitress at the upscale restaurant where they work, ostensibly so he can obtain his green card and become an American citizen. Monte alludes to likely being killed if he returns to Britain.

The waitress, Lucy, is an aspiring escape artist who is fixated on the legacy of Harry Houdini. She and her friend Vivian, a lingerie designer, conspire to rob the restaurant in order to fund their ambitions. Monte agrees to help with the robbery if Lucy agrees to marry him.

Although the robbery does not occur precisely according to plan, the trio are successful. However, Lucy later inadvertently forgets to meet Monte at the marriage registrar, causing him to lose a two million dollar bet with the restaurant owners that he could marry a waitress in a week.

In a double or nothing scenario, Monte wagers Lucy's skills as an escape artist. He tricks the women into playing along, claiming that the bosses have uncovered the robbery. Monte and Vivian drill Lucy in practicing her escape routine, and the morning before her performance, she and Monte make love.

As Lucy starts her routine, in which she must escape from handcuffs and a locked mailbag while underwater, Monte gives her Bess Houdini's wedding ring, which she had been desperate to buy, for luck. During the performance, Vivian robs the restaurant a second time, with the wealthy patrons playing along with the robbery that they think is a floor show. After several minutes the bag stops moving and Monte dives into the tank to save Lucy, but finds it empty, and Lucy appears unharmed with the escape completed. The delighted restaurant owners pay the bet, and Lucy agrees to a date with Monte so they can get to know each other better before riding off with Vivian .

== Cast ==
- Rosanna Arquette as Lucy
- David Bowie as Monte
- Marlee Matlin as Jeanette
- Eszter Balint as Vivian
- Buck Henry as Cecil
- Viveca Lindfors as Miracle
- Andre Gregory as Dante
- Kathy Kinney as Denise
- Maura Tierney as Cecelia
- James Avery as Phil
- Al Berry as bread man

Iman and Julian Lennon have cameos.

== Production ==
The movie was shot in late 1990, after Bowie had completed his Sound+Vision Tour. It was co-funded by Bowie's own production company, Isolar.

== Release ==
Different edits of the film were shown internationally under the titles The Linguini Incident, Houdini & Company, The Robbery, The Incident, and Shag-O-Rama. An assembly cut was released in Europe and Asia while a cut by the producers was released in the United States and Canada.

It was released on VHS in 1992, and again in January 2000 on DVD with the name Shag-O-Rama, The Robbery, and Houdini and Company.

== Critical response ==
Janet Maslin of The New York Times wrote that the film "trumpets its eccentricity with its title and casting, as well as in every other way it can".

Los Angeles Times staff writer Kevin Thomas called the film "a rarity, a contemporary screwball comedy that actually works".

Empire magazine gave the movie 1 star out of 5, calling it "an unbearably protracted dud".

In The Radio Times Guide to Films Lorien Haynes gave the film 2/5 stars, writing: "A designer restaurant called Dali is the setting for this bizarre and ultimately unsuccessful comedy. Bartender David Bowie, elegant as ever, is paired with a more quirky than usual Rosanna Arquette, who works as a waitress. Romance does blossom eventually, but not before cash-strapped Bowie has masterminded a robbery at the restaurant. Combine this with Arquette's Houdini-like desire to truss herself up in a tank full of water, and you have a plot as unappealing as a bowl of soggy pasta."

TV Guide gave the movie 2 stars out of 5, writing: "Arty Manhattanites come under the less-than-razor sharp gaze of writer-director Richard Shepard in The Linguini Incident, a meek comedy of manners ... Unfavorable comparisons with Susan Seidelman's Desperately Seeking Susan, particularly in light of Arquette's casting, are inevitable, but they're also apt. Desperately Seeking Susan was genuinely quirky and offbeat, capturing the cheerful chaos of shiftless Downtown lives; The Linguini Incident is a pale pretender that tries too hard."

Variety magazine called the movie an "uninspired, poverty row production" and lamented the miscasting of Bowie in the lead role.

Bowie biographer Nicholas Pegg called the movie "harmless but negligible", with a "misconceived script and turgid direction."

== Cult status ==
Since its initial release, the film has garnered a cult following. Collider called it "a hidden gem in Bowie's filmography" and "the best kind of cinematic comfort food".

Reviewer Virginie Pronovost wrote "it keeps you entertained from the beginning until the end with its humour, its peripeties and the overall aura of excitement".

One 2013 review from Mutant Reviewers says "here on my Island of Misfit Movies, The Linguini Incident lives on in a special place of honor".

== Director's cut ==
In 2021, Shepard was approached to make a director's cut of the film for a Blu-ray release. The rights to the film were initially held by Academy Entertainment, which went bankrupt and sold its film library to another company that also went bankrupt. The Linguini Incident was one of several films whose copyright was claimed by the Screen Actors Guild. Shepard had to find a print and faced difficulties as SAG did not have any and both the European distributor and processing lab went bankrupt. Shepard was able to find a 35 mm print of the film in 2022 through a Zurich art theater. On August 8, 2023, Shepard announced on his Twitter account that he had recovered the rights to the film and remastered it in 4K with a director's cut. The recut premiered at Vidiots on May 9, 2024 and the Blu-ray was released in July 2024.

== See also ==
- List of films featuring the deaf and hard of hearing

== Works cited ==
- Shepard, Richard (2024). "Take Two: Director Richard Shepard on redoing his first feature, The Linguini Incident". Filmmaker. Vol. 32, no. 4. The Gotham Film & Media Institute.
