= Fondation Vasarely =

Coordinates: 43.521154°N 5.424693°E

Fondation Vasarely is a museum in Aix en Provence, France, dedicated to the works of Victor Vasarely.

== History ==
Fondation Vasarely

Fondation Vasarely was established in 1966 by Victor Vasarely, aiming to build a centre "to promote his ideas of 'art for all' and of the 'city of tomorrow'." Construction of the building started in 1973 with architects John Sonnier and Dominique Ronsseray implementing the designs of Vasarely, and it was inaugurated 14 February 1976.

Forty-two 6 by 8 metres (20 ft × 26 ft) art works by Vasarely were constructed on the site to be on display in seven "cells", hexagonal rooms each 14 metres (46 ft) across and 11 metres (36 ft) high.
