= Fat Man and Little Boy (film) =

1989 film by Roland Joffé

- Theatrical release poster
- Directed by: Roland Joffé
- Screenplay by: Bruce Robinson; Roland Joffé
- Story by: Bruce Robinson
- Produced by: Tony Garnett
- Starring: Paul Newman; Dwight Schultz; Bonnie Bedelia; John Cusack; Laura Dern; John C. McGinley
- Cinematography: Vilmos Zsigmond
- Edited by: Françoise Bonnot
- Music by: Ennio Morricone
- Production company: Lightmotive
- Distributed by: Paramount Pictures
- Release date: October 20, 1989
- Running time: 127 minutes
- Country: United States
- Language: English
- Budget: $30 million
- Box office: $3.5 million

Fat Man and Little Boy (released in the United Kingdom as Shadow Makers) is a 1989 American epic historical war drama film directed by Roland Joffé, who co-wrote the script with Bruce Robinson. The story follows the Manhattan Project, the secret Allied endeavor to develop the first nuclear weapons during World War II. The film is named after "Little Boy" and "Fat Man", the two bombs dropped on the Japanese cities of Hiroshima and Nagasaki, respectively. The film stars Paul Newman as Leslie Groves and Dwight Schultz as J. Robert Oppenheimer, with supporting roles filled by Bonnie Bedelia, John Cusack, Laura Dern, John C. McGinley and Natasha Richardson.

== Plot ==
In September 1942, U.S. Army Corps of Engineers Colonel Leslie Groves, who oversaw the construction of the Pentagon, is assigned to head the ultra-secret Manhattan Project, to beat the Germans, who have a similar nuclear weapons program.

Groves picks University of California, Berkeley, physicist J. Robert Oppenheimer to head the project team. Oppenheimer was familiar with northern New Mexico from his boyhood days when his family owned a cabin in the area. For the new research facility, he selects a remote location on top of a mesa adjacent to a valley called Los Alamos Canyon, northwest of Santa Fe.

The different personalities of the military man Groves and the scientist Oppenheimer often clash in keeping the project on track. Oppenheimer in turn clashes with the other scientists, who debate whether their personal consciences should enter into the project or whether they should remain purely researchers, with personal feelings set aside.

Nurse Kathleen Robinson and young physicist Michael Merriman question what they are doing. As Michael works with no protection from radiation during an experiment dubbed Tickling the Dragon's Tail, a probe he is holding slips from an apparatus and he is instantly bathed in a blue light, which is a visible result of a lethal dose of radiation. In the base hospital, nurse Kathleen can only watch as he develops massive swelling and deformation before dying a miserable death days later.

While the technical problems are being solved, investigations are undertaken to thwart foreign espionage, especially from communist sympathizers who might be associated with socialist organizations. The snooping reveals that Oppenheimer has had a young mistress, Jean Tatlock, and he is ordered by Groves to stop seeing her. After he breaks off their relationship without being able to reveal the reasons why, she is unable to cope with the heartache and is later found dead, apparently a suicide.

As the project continues in multiple sites across America, technical problems and delays cause tensions and strife. To avoid a single point of failure plan, two separate bomb designs are implemented: a large, heavy plutonium bomb imploded using shaped charges ("Fat Man"), and an alternative design for a thin, less heavy uranium bomb triggered in a shotgun or gun-type design ("Little Boy"). The bomb development culminates in a detonation in south-central New Mexico at the Trinity Site in the Alamogordo Desert (05:29:45 on July 16, 1945), where everyone watches in awe the first mushroom cloud with roaring winds, even miles away. Both bombs, Fat Man and Little Boy, are successful, ushering in the Atomic Age.

== Cast ==
- Paul Newman as General Leslie Groves
- Dwight Schultz as J. Robert Oppenheimer
- Bonnie Bedelia as Kitty Oppenheimer
- John Cusack as Michael Merriman
- Laura Dern as Kathleen Robinson
- Ron Frazier as Peer de Silva
- Fred Thompson as Maj. Gen. Melrose Hayden Barry
- John C. McGinley as Capt. Richard Schoenfield, MD
- Natasha Richardson as Jean Tatlock
- Ron Vawter as Jamie Latrobe
- Michael Brockman as William Sterling Parsons
- Del Close as Dr. Kenneth Whiteside
- John Considine as Robert Tuckson
- Allan Corduner as Franz Goethe
- Todd Field as Robert R. Wilson
- Ed Lauter as Whitney Ashbridge
- Franco Cutietta as Enrico Fermi
- Joe D'Angerio as Seth Neddermeyer
- Jon DeVries as Johnny Mount
- Gerald Hiken as Leo Szilard
- Barry Yourgrau as Edward Teller
- James Eckhouse as Robert Harper
- Mary Pat Gleason as Dora Welsh
- Clark Gregg as Douglas Panton
- Péter Halász as George Kistiakowsky
- Robert Peter Gale as Dr. Louis Hempelemann
- Krzysztof Pieczyński as Otto Robert Frisch

== Basis ==
Most of the characters were real people and most of the events were real happenings, with some theatrical license used in the film.

The character of Michael Merriman (John Cusack) is a fictional composite of several people and is put into the film to provide a moral compass as the "common man". Part of the character is loosely based on the scientist Louis Slotin. Contrary to Merriman's death in the movie, Slotin's accident and death occurred after the dropping of the two bombs on Japan, and his early death was feared by some as karma after the event. A very similar mishap happened less than two weeks after the Nagasaki bomb, claiming the life of Harry Daghlian. Both incidents occurred with the same plutonium core, which became known as the demon core.

Even before Oppenheimer was chosen to be the lead scientist of the Manhattan Project, he was under surveillance by the Federal Bureau of Investigation (FBI) due to suspected Communist views. Once selected, the surveillance was constant: every single phone call was recorded and every contact with another person was noted. After he was picked to head the laboratory, he met with Tatlock only one time, in mid-June 1943, where she told him that she still loved him and wanted to be with him. After spending that night together, he never saw her again. She died by suicide six months after their meeting.

== Production ==
The filming took place in the fall of 1988 mainly outside Durango, Mexico, where the Los Alamos research facility was re-created. The re-creation of the Los Alamos laboratory entailed 35 buildings and cost over $2 million to construct in 1988.

"It was the best thing I've ever written", said Bruce Robinson. "The script was fucked up horribly by Roland."

== Soundtrack ==
The film's musical score was composed by Ennio Morricone. The entire score and extra music were released in 2011, by La La Land Records. The two-CD release, produced by Dan Goldwasser and mastered by Mike Matessino, has source cues, portions of others, and alternate takes that were dropped from the final cut of the film. The CD includes liner notes by film-music writer Daniel Schweiger. Only 3,000 copies were released.

== Reception ==
The film has been criticized for distortion of history for dramatic effect, and miscasting in its choices of Paul Newman for the role of General Groves, and Dwight Schultz for the role of Oppenheimer. Noted critic Roger Ebert felt the film lackluster, giving it 1 1/2 stars, saying, "The story of the birth of the bomb is one of high drama, but it was largely intellectual drama, as the scientists asked themselves, in conversations and nightmares, what terror they were unleashing on the Earth. Fat Man and Little Boy reduces their debates to the childish level of Hollywood stereotyping." The film holds a 50% rating on review aggregate Rotten Tomatoes based on 24 reviews.

The film made under $4 million on its original release. It entered the 40th Berlin International Film Festival.

== See also ==
- The Beginning or the End, 1947 docudrama film
- Day One, 1989 TV film about the Manhattan Project, a rival project released the same year as Fat Man and Little Boy
- Nuclear Secrets, 2007 TV mini-series with two episodes dedicated to the Manhattan Project
- Manhattan, 2014-15 television series set at the Manhattan Project
- Oppenheimer, 2023 biographical thriller film about J. Robert Oppenheimer
