= List of presidents of the Province of Ancona =

President of the Province of Ancona
- Presidente della Provincia di Ancona
- Incumbent; Daniele Carnevali since 20 December 2021
- Term length: 4 years
- Inaugural holder: Filippo Marcellini
- Formation: 1889

The president of the Province of Ancona is the head of the provincial government in Ancona, Marche, Italy. The president oversees the administration of the province, coordinates the activities of the municipalities, and represents the province in regional and national matters.

Since December 2021, the office has been held by Daniele Carnevali of the Italian Socialist Party.

== List ==
=== Presidents of the Provincial Deputation (1889–1928) ===
No.	Portrait	Name	Term		Party
No.	Portrait	Name	Start	End	Party
1		Filippo Marcellini	1889	1890	
2		Pietro Serafini	1890	1899	
3		Carlo Moroder	1900	1914	
4		Pompeo Baldoni	1914	1920	
		?	?	?	?
		Fernando Bartolini	1924	1928	National Fascist Party

=== Presidents of the Provincial Rectorate (1928–1944) ===
No.	Portrait	Name	Term		Party
No.	Portrait	Name	Start	End	Party
–		Fernando Bartolini	6 September 1928	April 1929	Special commissioner
1		Luigi Scoponi	April 1929	May 1935	National Fascist Party
2		Ettore Leopardi	1935	1939	National Fascist Party
3		Lodovico Maravalle	1939	1941	National Fascist Party
–		Antonio Zucchi (acting)	1941	1943	National Fascist Party
–		Ubaldo Olivi	August 1943	October 1943	Prefectural commissioner
4		Saverio Bosdari	October 1943	1944	Republican Fascist Party

=== Presidents of the Provincial Deputation (1944–1951) ===
No.	Portrait	Name	Term		Party
No.	Portrait	Name	Start	End	Party
1		Alessandro Bocconi	1944	1946	Italian Socialist Party
2		Franco Patrignani	1946	1948	Italian Communist Party
3		Arnaldo Ranaldi	1948	1951	Christian Democracy

=== Presidents of the Province (1951–present) ===
No.	Portrait	Name	Term		Party
No.	Portrait	Name	Start	End	Party
1		Arnaldo Ranaldi	1951	1960	Christian Democracy
2		Gino Borgiani	1960	1964	Independent
3		Giuseppe Serrini	1964	1967	Christian Democracy
4		Artemio Strazzi	24 April 1970	14 September 1970	Italian Socialist Party
5		Alberto Borioni	1970	1978	Italian Socialist Party
6		Araldo Torelli	1978	1985	Italian Socialist Party
7		Tommaso Mancia	1985	2 July 1987	Italian Socialist Party
8		Antonio Mastri	14 September 1987	23 September 1992	Christian Democracy
9		Mariano Guzzini	27 October 1992	9 December 1993	Democratic Party of the Left
10		Marisa Galeazzi Saracinelli	4 July 1994	24 May 1998	Democratic Party of the Left
11		Enzo Giancarli	25 May 1998	27 May 2002	Democrats of the Left
11		Enzo Giancarli	27 May 2002	27 May 2007	Democrats of the Left
12		Patrizia Casagrande Esposto	28 May 2007	12 October 2014	Democratic Party
13		Liana Serrani	13 October 2014	30 October 2018	Democratic Party
14		Luigi Cerioni	31 October 2018	3 October 2021	Independent (centre-left)
–		Andrea Storoni (acting)	4 October 2021	19 December 2021	Independent (centre-left)
15		Daniele Carnevali	20 December 2021	16 March 2026	Independent (centre-left); Italian Socialist Party
15		Daniele Carnevali	16 March 2026	Incumbent	Independent (centre-left); Italian Socialist Party

== Sources ==
- "Storia amministrativa dell'ente". Ministero dell'Interno.
- Menichini, Piera (2005). "I presidenti delle Province dall'Unità alla Grande guerra: repertorio analitico". Storia Amministrazione Costituzione (13): 224–225.
- Papini, Massimo; Severini, Marco (2011). Dizionario dei Presidenti della Provincia di Ancona (in Italian). Ancona: Provincia di Ancona.
