= Daniele Carnevali =

Italian politician (born 1973)

President of the Province of Ancona
- Incumbent
- Assumed office 20 December 2021
- Preceded by: Luigi Cerioni

Mayor of Polverigi
- Incumbent
- Assumed office 26 May 2014
- Preceded by: Massimino Paesani

Personal details
- Born: 22 August 1973 (age 53) Ancona, Marche, Italy
- Party: Italian Socialist Party

Daniele Carnevali (born 22 August 1973) is an Italian politician serving as president of the Province of Ancona since 2021. He has served as mayor of Polverigi since 2014.

In December 2021, Carnevali was elected president of the Province of Ancona for the centre-left coalition, defeating Marco Filipponi with 46,143 weighted votes to 39,134. He was re-elected in March 2026, securing 49,043 weighted votes compared with 35,266 for Luca Paolorossi.
