= American Stories: Food, Family and Philosophy =

1989 film

- Film poster
- Directed by: Chantal Akerman
- Written by: Chantal Akerman
- Produced by: Bertrand Van Effenterre
- Starring: Mark Amitin
- Cinematography: Luc Benhamou
- Edited by: Patrick Mimouni
- Music by: Sonia Wieder-Atherton
- Release date: February 1989
- Running time: 92 minutes
- Country: Belgium
- Languages: English; French

American Stories: Food, Family and Philosophy (French: Histoires d'Amérique) is a 1989 Belgian drama film directed by Chantal Akerman. It was entered into the 39th Berlin International Film Festival. The film deals with Jewish identity in the center of the United States.

== Plot ==
The film is set in New York City, near the Williamsburg Bridge. It follows several people telling their life stories.

== Cast ==
- Mark Amitin
- Eszter Balint
- Stephan Balint
- Kirk Baltz
- George Bartenieff
- Billy Bastiani
- Jacob Becker
- Isha Manna Beck
- Max Brandt
- Maurice Brenner
- David Buntzman
- Marilyn Chris
- Sharon Diskin
- Carl Don
- Dean Zeth Jackson as Teitelbaum
- Judith Malina
- Irina V. Passmoore (as Irina Pasmur)
- Herbert Rubens as Martin
- Victor Talmadge
