= Arkas Art Center =

Arkas Sanat Merkezi
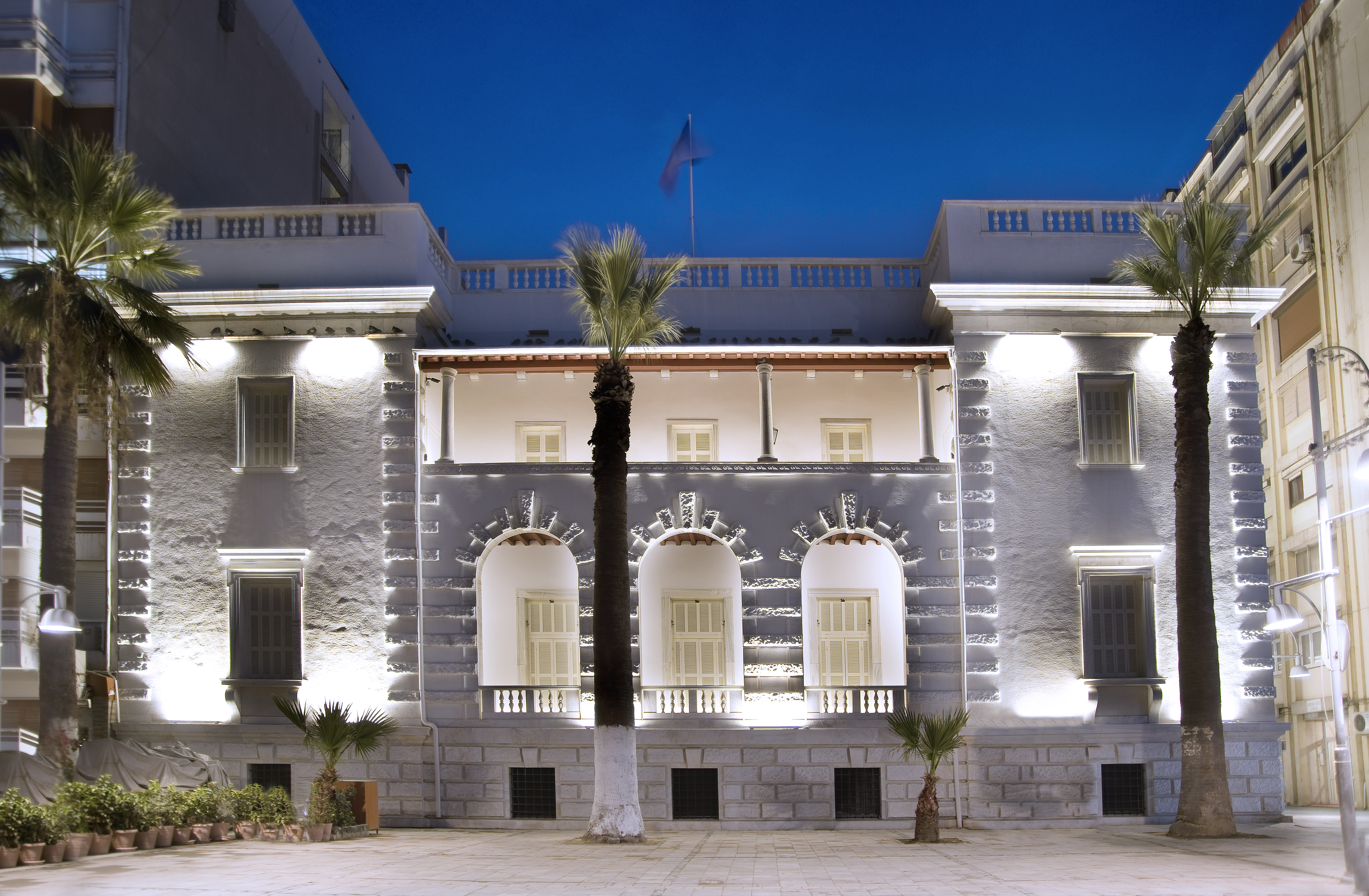

- Location within Turkey Aegean Location within Turkey
- Established: November 19, 2011
- Location: İzmir, Turkey
- Coordinates: 38.43208°N 27.13681°E
- Type: Art museum
- Website: www.arkassanatmerkezi.com

Arkas Sanat Merkezi (English; Arkas Art Center), an art museum located in the city of İzmir in Turkey. Opened in November 2011, the Arkas Collection created by Lucien Arkas, Chairman of the Arkas Holding, is on display.

== History ==
Located in Kordon and used by the Honorary Consulate of France, the part of the building facing Gulf of İzmir was transferred to Arkas Holding in 2010 for twenty years. The restored building was opened on 19 November 2011 as Arkas Art Center.

== Collections and exhibitions ==
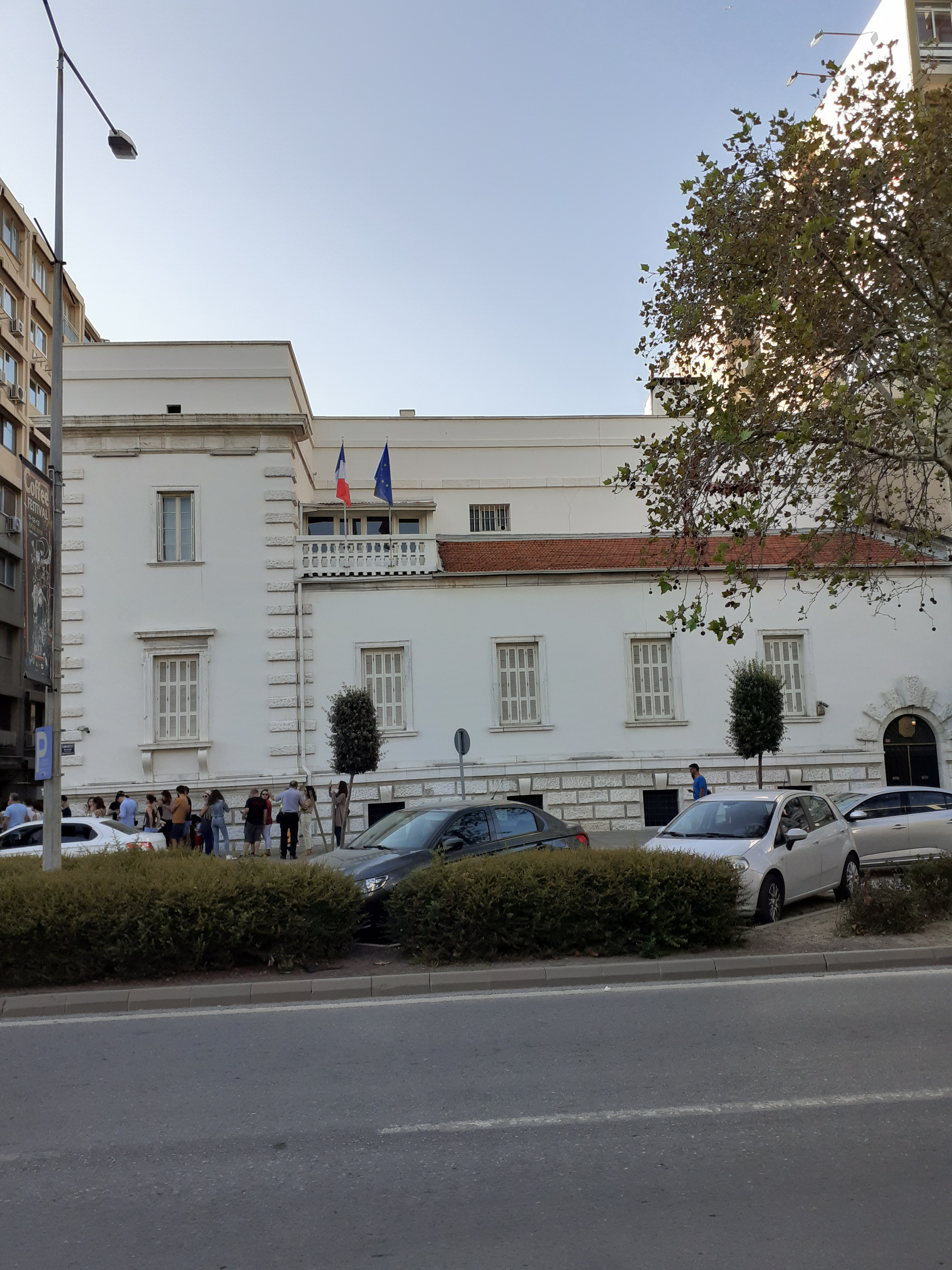
Visitors to the Picasso exhibition

Arkas Art Center exhibits various other works with the Arkas Collection, which was created by Lucien Arkas, the Chairman of Arkas Holding, and contains more than nine hundred works. From September 2019 to January 2020, Pablo Picasso's works were exhibited at the Arkas Art Center as part of the Picasso-Méditerranée project.

== Architectural information ==
Completed in 1906, the Arkas Art Center is a two-storey building. It has nine exhibition rooms and a workshop.
