= Eszter Balint =

Hungarian-American singer, songwriter, violinist, and actress (born 1966)

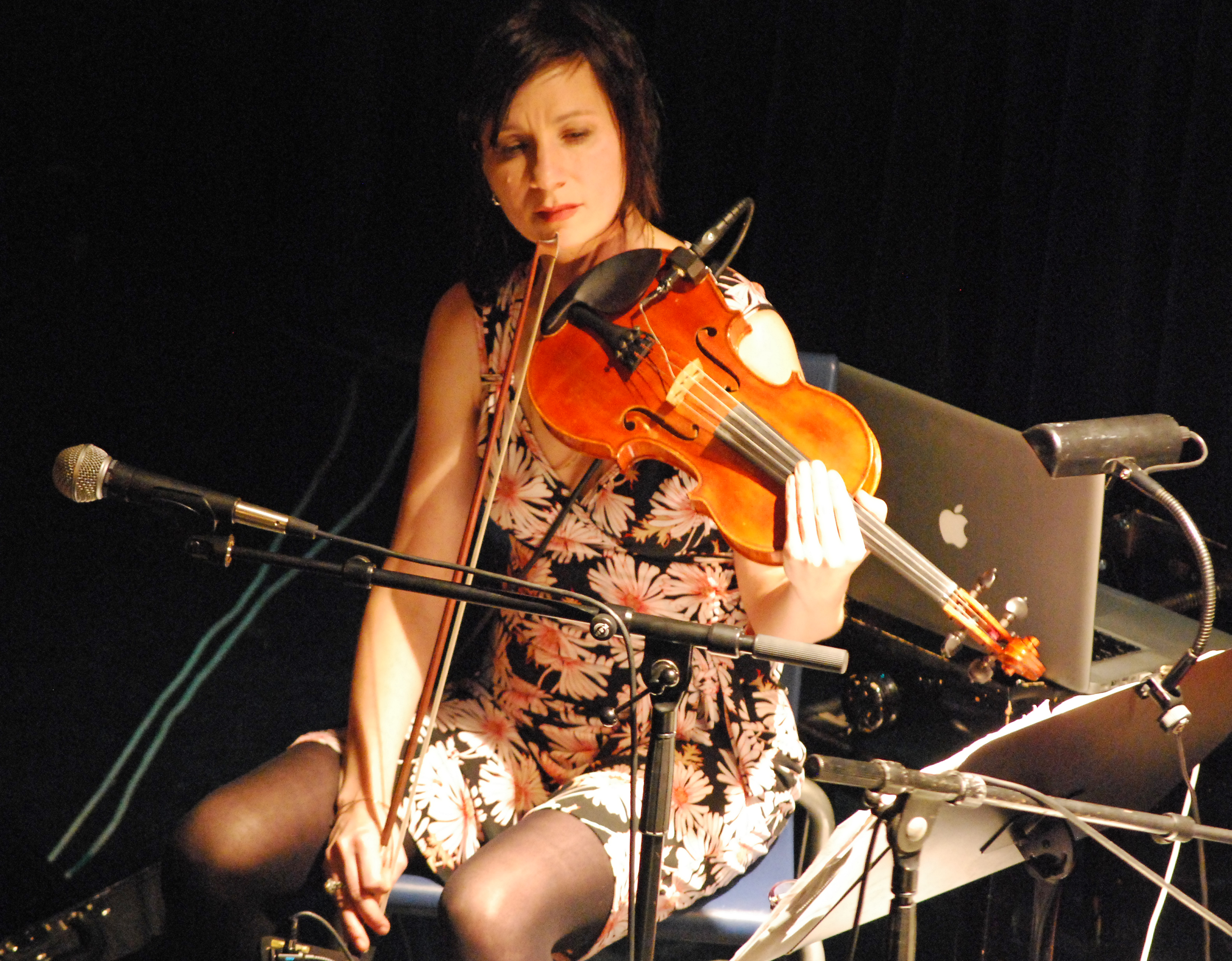
- Balint at a recording studio in Innsbruck, Austria, 2009
- Born: 7 July 1966 (age 60); Budapest, Hungary
- Occupations: Singer; songwriter; violinist; actress
- Years active: 1980–present
- Father: Stephan Balint

Eszter Balint (born 7 July 1966) is a Hungarian-American singer, songwriter, violinist, and actress. She made her film debut in Jim Jarmusch's Stranger Than Paradise (1984). She went on to receive a nomination for the Independent Spirit Award for Best Female Lead for Bail Jumper (1990). She also acted in American Stories: Food, Family and Philosophy (1989), Shadows and Fog (1991), Trees Lounge (1996), Downtown 81 (2000), and The Dead Don't Die (2019). She had a recurring role as Amia in the fourth season of Louis C.K.'s FX series Louie in 2014.

== Early life ==
Eszter Balint was born on 7 July 1966 in Budapest, Hungary, to Marianne Kollar and Stephan Balint. She was living with the avant-garde Squat Theatre troupe in New York City, founded by her father, when she first met Jean-Michel Basquiat. They became involved while he was filming Downtown 81. In 1983, Balint was brought into the studio by Basquiat to play violin on the influential hip-hop record "Beat Bop" by Rammellzee and K-Rob.

== Career ==
Balint made her cinematic debut in 1984 in director Jim Jarmusch's independent film Stranger Than Paradise. In 1985 she made her TV debut in Miami Vice as Dorothy Bain in the episode "Buddies". She appeared in the 1990 film Bail Jumper. Roles in The Linguini Incident (1991), Woody Allen's Shadows and Fog (1991) and Steve Buscemi's Trees Lounge (1996) followed. Balint's albums, Flicker (1998) and Mud (2004), both produced by J. D. Foster, were praised by The New York Times, The New Yorker, and Billboard. In his review of Mud, Jon Pareles writes: "Miss Balint has her own film noir sensibility as a songwriter. She puts arty twists into back-alley Americana... but the cleverness is not the point. She slips inside her characters to project their restlessness and longing."

Balint has appeared on recordings by Michael Gira's group Angels of Light, Marc Ribot's group Los Cubanos Postizos, John Lurie's album The Legendary Marvin Pontiac: Greatest Hits, Dayna Kurtz, and with the Swans. Her cover of the Serge Gainsbourg song "Un Poison Violent, C'est Ca L'amour" appears on the record Great Jewish Music: Serge Gainsbourg on John Zorn's Tzadik label released in 1997. She was a featured guest member of Marc Ribot's group Ceramic Dog, touring Europe throughout 2009 and is featured on their 2013 release Your Turn. In 2014, Balint appeared as Amia, a violin-playing Hungarian love interest for Louis C.K. on the latter's FX series, Louie. In 2015, Balint released her third album Airless Midnight, produced by J. D. Foster. That same year, Paste magazine premiered Balint's first official music video, "Trouble You Don't See". Josh Jackson wrote: "Paste named Eszter Balint an artist to watch back in 2004 after she released her second album Mud. In 2014 she released Airless Midnight, and had a recurring role in the fourth season of Louie. Balint played Fern in the 2019 film The Dead Don't Die.

Balint's most recent album I Hate Memory! came out in 2022 and was called a song cycle that is "a fervid tour of her avant-garde youth." Stew co-wrote man songs and sings too, Syd Straw also joins her on the album.

Balint has also been in the news for criticizing the rampant commercialization of Basquiat's work and image, telling the New York Post: "This kind of flattening and fetishizing takes people further away from the art."

== Filmography ==
=== Film ===
| Year | Title | Role | Director | Notes | Ref. |
|---|---|---|---|---|---|
| 1984 | Stranger Than Paradise | Eva | Jim Jarmusch | | |
| 1989 | American Stories: Food, Family and Philosophy | Actor | Chantal Akerman | | |
| 1989 | Wonderland USA | Herself | Zoe Beloff | Short film | |
| 1990 | Bail Jumper | Elaine | Christian Faber | | |
| 1991 | The Linguini Incident | Vivian | Richard Shepard | | |
| 1991 | Shadows and Fog | Woman with baby | Woody Allen | | |
| 1996 | Trees Lounge | Marie | Steve Buscemi | | |
| 2000 | Downtown 81 | Fashion Show Model | Edo Bertoglio | Documentary | |
| 2016 | A Woman, a Part | Heidi | Elisabeth Subrin | | |
| 2016 | Poor Boy | Missus Waxman | Robert Scott Wildes | | |
| 2019 | The Dead Don't Die | Fern | Jim Jarmusch | | |

=== Television ===
| Year | Title | Role | Notes | Ref. |
|---|---|---|---|---|
| 1985 | Miami Vice | Dorothy Bain | Episode: "Buddies" | |
| 2014 | Louie | Amia | 6 episodes | |

== Awards and nominations ==
| Year | Association | Category | Project | Result | Ref. |
|---|---|---|---|---|---|
| 1991 | Independent Spirit Award | Best Female Lead | Bail Jumper | Nominated | |
