= Eva Buchmuller =

Hungarian scenographer (born 1943)

- Born: 28 June 1943 (age 83); Budapest, Hungary
- Education: Hungarian University of Fine Arts
- Occupation: Scenographer
- Notable work: Squat Theatre
- Awards: Obie Award for Sustained Achievement in Design (1988); Guggenheim Fellowship (1991)

Éva Buchmüller (born 28 June 1943) is a Hungarian scenographer. Originally a freelance artist, she joined an underground theatre troupe which fled the country to New York City, where they became Squat Theatre. She served as a scenographer and actress for the troupe, and her accolades include a 1988 Obie Award for Sustained Achievement in Design and a 1991 Guggenheim Fellowship.

== Biography ==
Buchmuller was born on 28 June 1943 in Budapest. After obtaining a diploma from the Hungarian University of Fine Arts in 1967, she worked in Budapest for almost a decade as a freelance graphic artist and illustrator.

In 1973, Buchmuller joined an underground theatre troupe as one of its founding members. She worked with them as a set designer, as well as a painter and sculptor. In 1976, she left Hungary alongside the rest of the group, with whom she settled in New York City the next year, during which they founded Squat Theatre. In addition to scenography, she also appeared as an actor for Squat Theatre productions, including Andy Warhol's Last Love and Mr. Dead and Mrs. Free. She also became Squat Theatre's executive vice president in 1980 and manager in 1985.

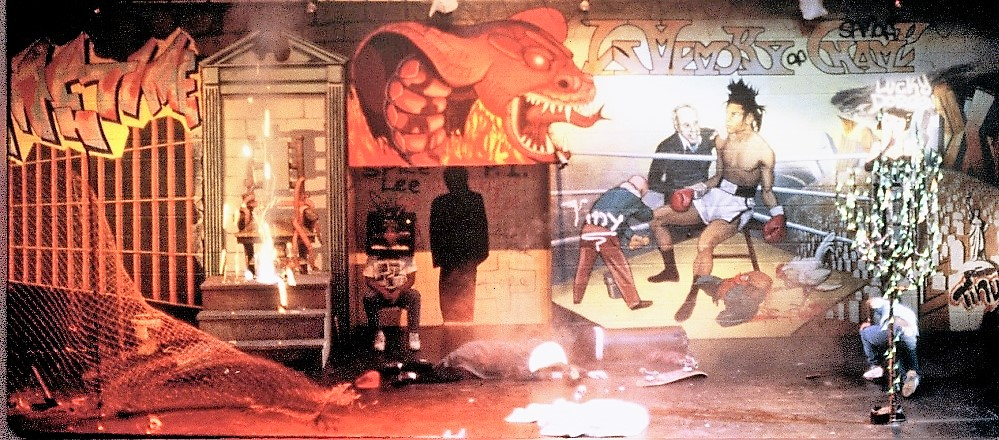
The set of Squat Theatre production Full Moon Killer, designed by Buchmuller

Buchmuller's work with Squat Theatre as a scenographer included Pig, Child, Fire!, Andy Warhol's Last Love, and Mr. Dead & Mrs. Free. Pat Donnelly of the Montreal Gazette called the "talking dummies" she created for Squat Theatre's 1985 Montreal production of Dreamland Burns were the "real stars of the show", remarking that "their blank faces, animated by special film projectors, become almost human," and Craig Bromberg of the Chicago Tribune noted that the dummies were "the proper theatrical device for the more traditional setting" of the play's Chicago production. Mel Gussow of The New York Times praised Buchmuller's well-restrained attitude towards her work on the L Train to Eldorado (1987). She won a 1988 Obie Award for Sustained Achievement in Design. In 1991, she was awarded a Guggenheim Fellowship "for visual art for the theatre".

After Squat Theatre disbanded, Buchmuller and Anna Koos wrote a book to accompany a 1996 Squat Theatre exhibition at Artists Space. She also assists in collaborations with historians and archives interested in Squat Theatre. Outside of Squat Theatre, she has also worked as an interior decorator, as well as an artistic painter specializing in flowers.

Buchmuller is based in New York City.
