= Polverigi =

- Comune
- Comune di Polverigi
- Coat of arms

- Location within Italy Location within Marche
- Coordinates: 43°31′N 13°24′E
- Country: Italy
- Region: Marche
- Province: Ancona (AN)
- Frazioni: Rustico

Government
  - Mayor: Daniele Carnevali

Area
  - Total: 24.98 km^{2} (9.64 sq mi)
- Elevation: 148 m (486 ft)

Population (31 December 2016)
  - Total: 4,590
  - Density: 184/km^{2} (476/sq mi)
- Demonym: Polverigiani
- Time zone: UTC+1 (CET)
  - Summer (DST): UTC+2 (CEST)
- Postal code: 60020
- Dialing code: 071
- Website: Official website

Polverigi is a comune (municipality) in the Province of Ancona in the Italian region Marche, located about 15 kilometres (9 mi) southwest of Ancona.

Polverigi borders the following municipalities: Agugliano, Ancona, Jesi, Offagna, Osimo, Santa Maria Nuova.

== Culture ==
Inteatro Festival is an international festival dedicated to the contemporary scene.

It produces and promotes theatre and dance, with a special attention to interdisciplinary experiences and international cooperation dynamics.
